= 12th century in poetry =

== Europe ==
=== Events ===
- Emergence of the troubadour, trouvère and minnesänger traditions, in the Occitan, Langues d'oïl and Middle High German vernaculars respectively

=== Major works ===
- 1180 to 1210 - Nibelungenlied
- Aiol and Mirabel in Old French
- The Tale of Igor's Campaign in Old East Slavic, dated near the end of the century
- Durham in Old English
- Ormulum in Middle English
- Chanson d'Antioche and other crusader tales at the beginning of the century.

=== Poets ===
- Chakhrukhadze poet, author of Tamariani
- Shota Rustaveli poet of the 12th century, author of "The Knight in the Panther's Skin"
- Chrétien de Troyes flourishes in the 1170s and 1180s
- Marie de France flourishes from approximately 1170 through 1205/1210, author of lais in Anglo-Norman
- Jean Bodel
- Undated troubadors
  - Bernart de Ventadorn (c. 1130s - c. 1190s)
  - Cercamon (fl. 1130s and 1140s)
  - Marcabru (fl. 1140s and 1150s)
  - Arnaut de Mareuil (fl. late 12th century)
- Goliard poets, writing in Latin, flourish in European universities
- Nigel de Longchamps, writing in Latin in England
- John of Hauville, writing in Latin, probably in France
- Walter of Châtillon, writing in Latin in France
- Cynddelw Brydydd Mawr, fl. in the last half of the century in Wales
- Joseph ben Isaac Bekhor Shor, writing in Hebrew in France in the last half of the century
- Hartmann von Aue (c. 1160 - 1210s), writing in Middle High German

== Middle East ==
=== Events ===
- Emergence of Turkic poetry

=== Byzantine poets ===
- Michael Glykas
- Theodore Prodromos (c. 1100 - c. 1165/70)
- Nicholas Kallikles
- John Tzetzes (c. 1100 - 1180)
- Constantine Manasses (c. 1130 - c. 1187)
- Manganeios Prodromos
- Constantine Stilbes
- Niketas Eugenianos

=== Arab world poets ===
- Ibn al-Farid (1181–1235)
- Muhyi al-din ibn al-'Arabi, (died 1240)
- Ahmad al-Tifashi (died 1253)

== Persia ==
=== Persian poets ===
- Adib Sabir ادیب صابر
- Am'aq عمعق بخارائی
- Anvari انوری ابیوردی
- Nasrullah Monshi
- Farid al-Din Attar, poet (about 1130-about 1220) فریدالدین عطار نیشاپوری
- Omar Khayyám, poet (1048-1131) عمر خیام
- Nizami Ganjavi, poet (about 1141–1209) نظامی
- Nizami Aruzi
- Saadi, poet (1184-1283/1291?) سعدی
- Sheikh Ruzbehanشیخ روزبهان
- Abdul Qadir Jilaniعبدالقادر گیلانی
- Khaqani Shirvani خاقانی شروانی
- Sanaayiسنایی
- Zhende pil
- Mohammad Aufi
- Masudi Ghaznavi
- Jmaluddin Aburuh
- Falaki Shirvani
- Hassan Ghaznavi, poet
- Ardeshir Ebadi
- Sanai Ghaznavi, poet
- Abulfadhl Meybodi
- Mu'izzi
- Ein-ul Quzzat Hamedani
- Mihani
- Shahmardan
- Ibn Balkhi
- Muzaffer Esfazari
- The author of Mejmal al-tawarikh wal-qesas
- Mohammed Ghanemi
- Qattan Marvzi
- Uthman Mukhtari
- Ismail Jorjani
- Mahsati مهستی گنجوی, a woman poet from Azerbaijan
- Omar ibn Sahlan
- Rashid al-Din Muhammad al-Umari Vatvat خولجه رشید الدین وطواط
- Abulfotuh Razi
- Nizami Arudhi Samarqandiنظامی عروضی سمرقندی

== China ==
=== Chinese poets ===
- Lu You 陸游 (1125–1209), Southern Song dynasty poet in the shi and ci forms, born on a boat on the Wei River early on a rainy morning, October 17; known for the poem 示儿 ("To my son")

== Japan ==
=== Japanese works ===
Imperial poetry anthologies:

- Kin'yō Wakashū 10 scrolls, 716 poems, ordered by former Emperor Shirakawa, drafts completed 1124–1127, compiled by Minamoto no Shunrai (Toshiyori)
- Shika Wakashū 10 scrolls, 411 poems, ordered in 1144 by former Emperor Sutoku, completed c. 1151–1154, compiled by Fujiwara Akisuke
- Senzai Wakashū 20 scrolls, 1,285 poems, ordered by former Emperor Shirakawa, probably completed in 1188, compiled by Fujiwara no Shunzei (also known as Toshinari)

=== Japanese poets ===
- Fujiwara no Akisue 藤原顕季 (1055–1123), late Heian period poet and nobleman, member of the Fujiwara poetic and aristocratic clan
- Fujiwara no Ietaka 藤原家隆 (1158–1237), early Kamakura period waka poet; has several poems in the Shin Kokin Wakashū anthology; related by marriage to Jakuren; pupil of Fujiwara no Shunzei's
- Fujiwara no Shunzei 藤原俊成, also known as "Fujiwara no Toshinari", "Shakua" 釈阿, "Akihiro" 顕広 (1114–1204), poet and nobleman, noted for his innovations in the waka poetic form and for compiling Senzai Wakashū ("Collection of a Thousand Years"), the seventh Imperial anthology of waka poetry; father of Fujiwara no Teika; son of Fujiwara no Toshitada
- Fujiwara no Teika 藤原定家, also known as "Fujiwara no Sadaie" or "Sada-ie" (1162–1242), a widely venerated late Heian period and early Kamakura period waka poet and (for centuries) extremely influential critic; also a scribe, scholar and widely influential anthologist; the Tale of Matsura is generally attributed to him; son of Fujiwara no Shunzei; associated with Jakuren
- Fujiwara no Tameie 藤原為家 (1198–1275), the central figure in a circle of poets after the Jōkyū War in 1221; second son of poets Teika and Abutuni
- Emperor Go-Toba, 後鳥羽天皇, also known as 山科僧正 (1180–1239)
- Gyōi 行意 (1177–1217?), late Heian, early Kamakura period poet and Buddhist monk; one of the New Thirty-six Poetry Immortals; son of Fujiwara no Motofusa
- Jakuren 寂蓮, also known as "Fujiwara no Sadanaga" 藤原定長 before becoming a monk (1139–1202), initially adopted by Fujiwara no Shunzei, later stepped aside as Shunzei's heir and became a Buddhist priest; on the model of Saigyo, traveled around the country, composing poems; frequently associated with Fujiwara no Teika; one of six compilers of the eighth imperial waka anthology, Shin Kokin Wakashū, which contains 36 of his poems; adopted Fujiwara no Ietaka, a pupil of Shunzei's; has a poem in the Hyakunin Isshu anthology
- Jien 慈円 (1155–1225) poet, historian, and Buddhist monk
- Jinzai Kiyoshi 神西清 (1903–1957) Shōwa period novelist, translator, literary critic, poet and playwright
- Kamo no Chōmei 鴨長明 (1155–1216), author, waka poet and essayist
- Minamoto no Shunrai, also "Minamoto Toshiyori", (c. 1057–1129) poet who compiled the Gosen Wakashū anthology; passed over to compile the Goshūi Wakashū, Shunrai's angry polemical, "Errors in the Goshūishū", apparently led Emperor Shirakawa to appoint him to compile the Kin'yō Wakashū imperial anthology, which was itself controversial
- Minamoto no Yorimasa 源頼政 (1106–1180) poet, government official and warrior; his poems appeared in various anthologies
- Saigyō Hōshi 西行法師 pen name of Satō Norikiyo 佐藤義清, who took the religious name En'i 円位 (1118–1190), late Heian and early Kamakura period waka poet who worked as a guard to retired Emperor Toba, then became a Buddhist monk at age 22
- Princess Shikishi 式子内親王 (died 1201), late Heian and early Kamakura period poet, never-married daughter of Emperor Go-Shirakawa; entered service at the Kamo Shrine in Kyoto in 1159, later left the shrine, in later years a Buddhist nun; has 49 poems in the Shin Kokin Shū anthology
- Shunzei's Daughter, popular name of Fujiwara Toshinari no Musume 藤原俊成女、, also 藤原俊成卿女、皇(太)后宮大夫俊成(卿)女, 越部禅尼 (c. 1171 – c. 1252), called the greatest female poet of her day, ranked with Princess Shikishi; her grandfather was the poet Fujiwara no Shunzei

== South Asia ==
=== Poets ===
- Jayadeva, Gita Govinda, in Sanskrit
- Akka Mahadevi, in Kannada
- Allama Prabhu, in Kannada
- Nagavarma II, in Kannada
- Rudrabhatta, in Kannada
- Chand Bardai, in Hindi
- Fariduddin Ganjshakar, in Punjabi

== Southeast Asia ==
- Kakawin Hariwangsa (mid-century), in Java

== Decades and years ==
1090s	1090	1091	1092	1093	1094	1095	1096	1097	1098	1099
1100s	1100	1101	1102	1103	1104	1105	1106	1107	1108	1109
1110s	1110	1111	1112	1113	1114	1115	1116	1117	1118	1119
1120s	1120	1121	1122	1123	1124	1125	1126	1127	1128	1129
1130s	1130	1131	1132	1133	1134	1135	1136	1137	1138	1139
1140s	1140	1141	1142	1143	1144	1145	1146	1147	1148	1149
1150s	1150	1151	1152	1153	1154	1155	1156	1157	1158	1159
1160s	1160	1161	1162	1163	1164	1165	1166	1167	1168	1169
1170s	1170	1171	1172	1173	1174	1175	1176	1177	1178	1179
1180s	1180	1181	1182	1183	1184	1185	1186	1187	1188	1189
1190s	1190	1191	1192	1193	1194	1195	1196	1197	1198	1199
1200s	1200	1201	1202	1203	1204	1205	1206	1207	1208	1209
