= 13th century in poetry =

== Europe ==
=== Events ===
- The Sicilian School, Dolce Stil Novo, and later the Tuscan School mark the emergence of literary Italian

=== Works ===
- Huon of Bordeaux written (c. 1216 to 1268)
- Nibelunglied written approximately 1180–1210
- Lucas de Tuy and others, Chronicon Mundi ("Great Chronicle of the World"); Spain
- King Horn, the oldest known English verse romance, is written around 1225
- Poema de Fernán González written between 1250 and 1266
- Le Récit d'un ménestrel de Reims written around 1260
- Roman de la Rose written by Guillaume de Lorris (around 1230) and Jean de Meun (around 1275)
- The Codex Regius, the manuscript in which the Poetic Edda is preserved, is written (c. 1270s)
- Heinrich der Vogler compiles Dietrichs Flucht around 1280
- The Owl and the Nightingale perhaps composed around 1280 (but may be up to a century later)
- Havelok the Dane written in Middle English (c. 1285–1290)
- Liber sex festorum beatae Virginis written by Gottfried von Hagenau 1293–1300
- Völsunga saga is written in the late 13th century
- Oral tradition of Robin Hood and the ballads of Robin Hood emerge in England

=== Poets ===
- Giacomo da Lentini, founder of the Sicilian School and author of the earliest known Sonnets
- Guido Guinizelli (d. before 1276)
- Guido Cavalcanti (c. 1255–1300)
- Hadewijch, Dutch woman mystic
- Cynddelw Brydydd Mawr, Welsh
- Ibn Sahl of Seville (1212/13–1251)
- John Peckham (d. 1292), Archbishop of Canterbury and probable author of Philomena
- Jacob van Maerlant (c. 1230/40–1288/1300), Flemish poet writing in Middle Dutch
- Konrad von Würzburg (d. 1287), German
- Scots-Gaelic crusaders and poets Muireadhach Albanach and Gillebríghde Albanach flourish at the beginning of the century

== East Asia ==
=== China ===
==== Poets ====
- Lu You 陸游 (1125–1209), Southern Song dynasty poet

=== Japan ===
==== Works ====
Japanese poetry anthologies:

- Shin Kokin Wakashū (also spelled "Shinkokinshu") the eighth Japanese imperial waka poetry anthology. Its name apparently aimed to show the relation and counterpart to Kokin Wakashū, ordered in 1201 by former Emperor Go-Toba, compiled by Fujiwara no Teika (whose first name is sometimes romanized as Sadaie), Fujiwara Ariie, Fujiwara Ietaka (Karyū), the priest Jakuren, Minamoto Michitomo, and Asukai Masatsune (completed in 1205)
- Shinchokusen Wakashū
- Shokugosen Wakashū
- Shokukokin Wakashū

==== Poets ====
- Asukai Gayu 飛鳥井雅有, also known as "Asukai Masaari" (1241–1301), Kamakura period nobleman and poet; has 86 poems in the official anthology Shokukokin Wakashū
- Eifuku-mon In 永福門院, also written "Eifuku Mon'in", also known as Saionji Shōko 西園寺しょう子, 西園寺鏱子 (1271–1342) Kamakura period poet and a consort of the 92nd emperor, Fushimi; she belonged to the Kyōgoku school of verse; has poems in the Gyokuyōshū anthology
- Fujiwara no Ietaka 藤原家隆 (1158–1237), early Kamakura period waka poet; has several poems in the Shin Kokin Wakashū anthology; related by marriage to Jakuren; pupil of Fujiwara no Shunzei's
- Fujiwara no Shunzei 藤原俊成, also known as "Fujiwara no Toshinari", "Shakua" 釈阿, "Akihiro" 顕広 (1114–1204), poet and nobleman, noted for his innovations in the waka poetic form and for compiling Senzai Wakashū ("Collection of a Thousand Years"), the seventh Imperial anthology of waka poetry; father of Fujiwara no Teika; son of Fujiwara no Toshitada
- Fujiwara no Tameie 藤原為家 (1198–1275), the central figure in a circle of poets after the Jōkyū War in 1221; second son of poets Teika and Abutuni
- Fujiwara no Teika 藤原定家, also known as "Fujiwara no Sadaie" or "Sada-ie" (1162–1242), a widely venerated late Heian period and early Kamakura period waka poet and (for centuries) extremely influential critic; also a scribe, scholar and widely influential anthologist; the Tale of Matsura is generally attributed to him; son of Fujiwara no Shunzei; associated with Jakuren
- Emperor Go-Toba, 後鳥羽天皇, also known as 山科僧正 (1180–1239)
- Gyōi 行意 (1177–1217?), late Heian, early Kamakura period poet and Buddhist monk; one of the New Thirty-six Poetry Immortals; son of Fujiwara no Motofusa
- Jakuren 寂蓮, also known as "Fujiwara no Sadanaga" 藤原定長 before becoming a monk (1139–1202), initially adopted by Fujiwara no Shunzei, later stepped aside as Shunzei's heir and became a Buddhist priest; on the model of Saigyo, traveled around the country, composing poems; frequently associated with Fujiwara no Teika; one of six compilers of the eighth imperial waka anthology, Shin Kokin Wakashū, which contains 36 of his poems; adopted Fujiwara no Ietaka, a pupil of Shunzei's; has a poem in the Hyakunin Isshu anthology
- Jakushitsu Genkō 寂室元光 (1290–1367), Rinzai Zen master, poet, flute player, and first abbot of Eigen-ji, which was constructed solely for him to teach Zen
- Jien 慈円 (1155–1225) poet, historian, and Buddhist monk
- Kamo no Chōmei 鴨長明 (1155–1216), author, waka poet and essayist
- Sesson Yūbai 雪村友梅 (1290–1348), poet and Buddhist priest of the Rinzai sect who founded temples
- Princess Shikishi 式子内親王 (d. 1201), late Heian and early Kamakura period poet, never-married daughter of Emperor Go-Shirakawa; entered service at the Kamo Shrine in Kyoto in 1159, later left the shrine, in later years a Buddhist nun; has 49 poems in the Shin Kokin Shū anthology
- Shunzei's Daughter, popular name of Fujiwara Toshinari no Musume 藤原俊成女、, also 藤原俊成卿女、皇(太)后宮大夫俊成(卿)女, 越部禅尼 (c. 1171 – c. 1252), called the greatest female poet of her day, ranked with Princess Shikishi; her grandfather was the poet Fujiwara no Shunzei
- Ton'a 頓阿 also spelled as "Tonna"; lay name: Nikaidō Sadamune 二階堂貞宗 (1289–1372), poet and Buddhist monk

=== Korea ===
- U Tak (1262–1342)

== Byzantine Empire ==
- Aaron ben Joseph of Constantinople (c. 1260 – c. 1320)

== Persia and Persian language ==
=== Persian-language poets ===
- Attar of Nishapur, poet (c. 1130 – c. 1230)
- Rumi, poet (1207–1273)
- Sultan Walad
- Saadi Shirazi, poet (1184–1283/1291?)
- Rashid-al-Din Hamadani, (1247–1318)
- Amir Khusrow
- Shams Tabrizi
- Ruzbihan Baqli
- Zahed Gilani
- Khwaju Kermani
- Mahmoud Shabestari
- Najm al-Din Razi
- Muhammad Aufi
- Qazi Beiza'i
- Awhadi Maraghai
- Auhaduddin Kermani
- Ghiyas al-Din ibn Rashid al-Din
- Ibn Yamin
- Ata-Malik Juvayni
- Sharaf al-Din Harun Juvayni

== Arab world ==
- Busiri (Abū 'Abdallāh Muhammad ibn Sa'īd ul-Būsīrī Ash Shadhili, 1211–1294) writes Qaṣīda al-Burda (Arabic: قصيدة البردة, "Poem of the Mantle") in praise of the Islamic prophet Muhammad
- Ibn Sahl of Seville (1212–1251)
- Al-Shabb al-Zarif al-Tilimsani (d. 1289)

== South Asia ==
- Andayya writes Kabbigara Kava ("Poets' Defender") (1217–1235) in Kannada
- Amir Khusro (1253–1325) writes poetry primarily in Persian, but also in Hindavi
- Dnyaneshwar (1275–1296) writes the Dnyaneshwari at age 15 or 16 and also the Amrutanubhav in Marathi (ovi metre) and his sister Muktabai (1279–1297) writes abhang poetry
- Changdev Maharaj writes abhang poetry in Marathi
- Raghavanka writes Harishchandra Kavya (c.1200 or c.1225) in Kannada
- Palkuriki Somanatha probably writes in Telugu, Kannada and Sanskrit

== Sub-saharan Africa ==
- Period of the Epic of Sundiata, transmitted through oral tradition.
