= 1212 in poetry =

List of years in poetry	(table)
- … 1202; 1203; 1204; 1205; 1206; 1207; 1208; 1209; 1210; 1211; 1212; 1213; 1214; 1215; 1216; 1217; 1218; 1219; 1220; 1221; 1222 …
- In literature 1209 1210 1211 1212 1213 1214 1215
- Art; Archaeology; Architecture; Literature; Music; Philosophy; Science; +...

== Events ==
- Walther von der Vogelweide wrote Der Ottenton
- Bertran de Gourdon wrote two coblas on doing homage to Philip II of France
- May 6 — The troubadour Ademar Jordan was captured in battle by Simon de Montfort, 5th Earl of Leicester and never heard from again

== Births ==
- Ibn Sahl of Seville (died 1251), Arabic language Moorish poet of Andalusia

== See also ==
- Poetry
- List of years in poetry
