= 1207 in poetry =

| List of years in poetry | (table) |
- … 1197; 1198; 1199; 1200; 1201; 1202; 1203; 1204; 1205; 1206; 1207; 1208; 1209; 1210; 1211; 1212; 1213; 1214; 1215; 1216; 1217 …
- In literature 1204 1205 1206 1207 1208 1209 1210
- Art; Archaeology; Architecture; Literature; Music; Philosophy; Science; +...

== Births ==
- Rumi (died 1273), 13th-century Turkish poet, Islamic jurist, theologian, and mystic.

== Deaths ==
- Xin Qiji (born 1140), Chinese Song dynasty poet and military leader
