= 1200 in poetry =

List of years in poetry	(table)
- … 1190; 1191; 1192; 1193; 1194; 1195; 1196; 1197; 1198; 1199; 1200; 1201; 1202; 1203; 1204; 1205; 1206; 1207; 1208; 1209; 1210 …
- In literature 1197 1198 1199 1200 1201 1202 1203
- Art; Archaeology; Architecture; Literature; Music; Philosophy; Science; +...

== Events ==
- Sólarljóð (The Song of the Sun) an Old Norse poem, written in Iceland

== Births ==
- Jehan Erart born 1200 or 1210 (died 1259), trouvère
- Ulrich von Liechtenstein (died 1278), German medieval nobleman, knight, politician, and Minnesänger
- possible
  - Jayadeva (died unknown), Sanskrit poet known for the epic Gita Govinda

== Deaths ==
- Chand Bardai (born 1149), Hindu Brahmin and the court poet of the Indian king Prithviraj Chauhan
- Zhu Xi (born 1130), Confucian scholar, philosopher and writer
