= 11th century in poetry =

Years link to the corresponding "[year] in poetry" articles.

== Europe ==
=== Events ===
- The surviving Beowulf manuscript likely dates to the early 11th century.
- Emergence of Occitan as a literary language and of the first troubadors.
- King Bleddyn ap Cynfyn enacts new laws regulating the activities of Welsh bards and musicians around 1070.
- Earliest possible date for The Song of Roland

=== Poets ===
- Boyan, an early skald of Rus'.
- Bersi Skáldtorfuson flourishes in Iceland at the beginning of the century. He is captured at the naval Battle of Nesjar in 1016 and imprisoned.

== Byzantine Empire ==
=== Poets ===
- Christopher of Mytilene
- John Mauropous

== The Arabic World ==
=== Poets ===
- Al-Saraqusti al-Jazzar, (11th century)
- Samuel ibn Naghrillah (993–after 1056)

=== Births in the Arabic world ===
- al-Sharif al-Radi, (born 1016)
- Ibn Ammar (c. 1031–1086)
- Ibn Khafajah, (born 1039)
- Moses ibn Ezra (c. 1055–1138), Hebrew poet in Al-Andalus
- Ibn Quzman (1078–1160)

=== Deaths in the Arab world ===
- Badi' al-Zaman al-Hamadhani (967–1007)
- Abu ibn Abd Allah al-Ma'arri (973–1057)
- Al-Mu'tamid ibn Abbad (Muhammad Ibn Abbad Al Mutamid) (1040–1095), poet-ruler in Al-Andalus
- Ibn Ammar (c. 1031–1086), in Al-Andalus (killed by Al-Mu'tamid ibn Abbad)
- Wallada bint al-Mustakfi (994–1091)

== The Turkic World ==
- Oral traditions of Epic of Köroğlu
- Uyghur poet Yusuf Khass Hajib of Balasagun in the Kara-Khanid Khanate completes the Kutadgu Bilig ("The Wisdom Which Brings Good Fortune") and presents it to the prince of Kashgar in 462 (1069/1070 AD)

== Persia ==
=== Works ===
- Firdawsi's Shahnameh is published in the first decade of the century
- Qabus-Nama
- Rubaiyat of Omar Khayyam dates to the end of the century
- Shahryar-Nama, attributed to Uthman Mukhtari
- Siyasatnama

=== Persian poets ===
- Baba Taher
- Rabi'a Balkhi, an early women poet
- Asad Gorgani
- Asjadi
- Ferdowsi, poet (925–1020)
- Omar Khayyám, poet (1048–1131)
- Hujviri (died 1073)
- Abusaeid Abolkheir (967–1049)
- Sanai Ghaznavi
- Abdul Qadir Jilani
- Manuchihri
- Sanaayi
- Abolfazl Beyhaghi, historian
- Naser Khosrow, traveller, writer and poet
- Farrokhi Sistani (فرخی سيستانی), poet
- Baba Tahir Oryan
- Rabi'ah Quzdari
- Abu-al-faraj Runi
- The author of Eskandar name the epic of Alexander (Novel)
- Keykavus Eskandar
- Nizam al-Mulk, author of Siyasatnama
- Tartusi novelist
- Azraqi
- Masud Sa'd Salman
- Uthman Mukhtari
- Qatran Tabrizi
- Muqatil ibn Atiyah
- Asadi Tusi
- Surabadi
- Nizami Arudhi Samarqandi
- Imam Muhammad Ghazali
- Mohammad Raduyani
- Abhari
- Abu l-Abbas Rabinjani
- Abu-Ali Osmani
- Abul-Ma'ali

== India ==
=== Events ===
- Beginning of Hoysala literature in Kannada and Sanskrit
- Nannayya, Aadi Kavi ("the first poet"), around 1022 begins work on Andhra Mahabharatam, a translation of the Mahabharata into Telugu and the first work of Telugu literature

=== Works ===
- Ramavataram (or earlier)

=== Poets ===
- Kambar, writing in Tamil
- Bilhana, Kashmiri

== China ==
=== Chinese poets ===
- Poet and polymath Su Shi is sent into internal exile 1080–1086 for political reasons. During this period he writes the first and second Chibifu (赤壁賦 "The Red Cliffs")
- Su Shi 蘇軾 (1037–1101), Song dynasty writer, poet, painter, calligrapher, pharmacologist, gastronome and statesman, writing in the shi, ci and fu forms; notable works include the First and Second Chibifu (赤壁賦 The Red Cliffs, 1080–1086), Nian Nu Jiao: Chibi Huai Gu (念奴嬌.赤壁懷古 Remembering Chibi, to the tune of Nian Nu Jiao) and Shui diao ge tou (水調歌頭 Remembering Su Zhe on the Mid-Autumn Festival, 中秋節)

== Japan ==
=== Japanese works ===
Imperial poetry anthologies:

- Shūi Wakashū 20 scrolls, 1,351 poems, ordered by ex-Emperor Kazan
- Goshūi Wakashū 20 scrolls, approx 1,200 poems, ordered in 1075 by Emperor Shirakawa, completed in 1086

=== Japanese poets ===
- Akazome Emon 赤染衛門 (956–1041) waka poet of the mid-Heian period; a member of both the Thirty-six Elder Poetic Sages and Kintō's 36 female poetry immortals (or "sages") of the Kamakura period
- Fujiwara no Akisue 藤原顕季 (1055–1123), late Heian period poet and nobleman, member of the Fujiwara poetic and aristocratic clan
- Fujiwara no Kintō 藤原公任, also known as "Shijō-dainagon" (966–1041), poet and critic; one of the Thirty-six Poetry Immortals; has poems in anthologies including the Shūi Wakashū, the Wakan rōeishū, and Shūi Wakashū
- Fujiwara no Tametoki 藤原為時 (died 1029?), poet, minor official and governor of various provinces, scholar of Chinese literature and the father of Murasaki Shikibu ("Lady Murasaki")
- Izumi Shikibu 和泉式部 nicknamed "The Floating Lady" 浮かれ女 for her series of passionate affairs (born c. 976 – year of death unknown, sometime after 1033), mid-Heian period poet, novelist and noblewoman; one of the Thirty-six Poetry Immortals; known for a sequence of affairs at the court in the capital; close friend of Akazome Emon, rival of Lady Murasaki, and mother of poet Koshikibu no Naishi; poetry praised by Fujiwara no Kinto
- Minamoto no Shunrai, also "Minamoto Toshiyori", (c. 1057–1129) poet who compiled the Gosen Wakashū anthology; passed over to compile the Goshūi Wakashū, Shunrai's angry polemical, "Errors in the Goshūishū", apparently led Emperor Shirakawa to appoint him to compile the Kin'yō Wakashū imperial anthology, which was itself controversial
- Murasaki Shikibu 紫 式 部, not her real name, which is unknown; often called "Lady Murasaki" (c. 973 – c. 1014 or 1025), Heian period novelist who wrote The Tale of Genji, poet, and a maid of honor of the imperial court
- Nōin 能因, lay name: Tachibana no Nagayasu 橘永愷 (988 – c. 1051), late Heian period poet and monk; one of the "Thirty-six Medieval Poetry Immortals"
- Sei Shōnagon 清少納言 (c. 966–1017), middle Heian Period author, poet and court lady who served Empress Teishi/Empress Sadako; best known as the author of The Pillow Book

== Decades and years ==
990s	990	991	992	993	994	995	996	997	998	999
1000s	1000	1001	1002	1003	1004	1005	1006	1007	1008	1009
1010s	1010	1011	1012	1013	1014	1015	1016	1017	1018	1019
1020s	1020	1021	1022	1023	1024	1025	1026	1027	1028	1029
1030s	1030	1031	1032	1033	1034	1035	1036	1037	1038	1039
1040s	1040	1041	1042	1043	1044	1045	1046	1047	1048	1049
1050s	1050	1051	1052	1053	1054	1055	1056	1057	1058	1059
1060s	1060	1061	1062	1063	1064	1065	1066	1067	1068	1069
1070s	1070	1071	1072	1073	1074	1075	1076	1077	1078	1079
1080s	1080	1081	1082	1083	1084	1085	1086	1087	1088	1089
1090s	1090	1091	1092	1093	1094	1095	1096	1097	1098	1099
1100s	1100	1101	1102	1103	1104	1105	1106	1107	1108	1109
