= 1140s in poetry =

This article covers 1140s in poetry. Nationality words link to articles with information on the nation's poetry or literature (for instance, Irish or France).

== Works published ==
1147:

- Bernard Silvestris's Cosmographia presented to the Pope

1148/1149:

- Ysengrimus by Nivardus.

== Births ==
Death years link to the corresponding "[year] in poetry" article. There are conflicting or unreliable sources for the birth years of many people born in this period; where sources conflict, the poet is listed again and the conflict is noted:

1140:

- Beatritz de Dia (died unknown), French trobairitz (female troubadour)
- Xin Qiji (died 1207), Chinese Song dynasty poet and military leader
- Dietmar von Aist (died 1171), an early Minnesänger (possible)

1141:

- Nizami Ganjavi (died 1209), Persian romantic epic poet

1142:

- Farid al-Din Attar (died 1221), Persian

1145:

- Ibn Jubayr (died 1217), geographer, traveler and poet from al-Andalus
- Attar Neyshapuri (died 1221), Persian Muslim poet, theoretician of Sufism, and hagiographer

1147:

- Raimbaut of Orange (died 1173), Occitan troubadour (approx.)

1149:

- Chand Bardai (died 1200), Hindu Brahmin and the court poet of the Indian king Prithviraj Chauhan

== Deaths ==
Birth years link to the corresponding "[year] in poetry" article:

1141:

- Yehuda Halevi (born 1075), Hebrew poet in Al-Andalus

1142:

- Yue Fei (born 1103), Song
- Peter Abelard (born 1079), French, writing in Latin

1143:

- Adib Sabir (born unknown), Persian

1147:

- Jaufré Rudel (born unknown), an Occitan troubadour

1148:

- Am'aq (born 1048), Persian poet that carried the title amir al-shu'ara ("Amir of poets")
- Bernard Silvestris (born 1085), a Latin poet in France

== See also ==
- Poetry
- 12th century in poetry
- 12th century in literature
- List of years in poetry

Other events:

- Other events of the 12th century
- Other events of the 13th century

12th century:

- 12th century in poetry
- 12th century in literature
