= 1150s in poetry =

Nationality words link to articles with information on the nation's poetry or literature (for instance, Irish or France).

== Events ==
1151:

- Shika Wakashū, a Japanese imperial poetry anthology, begun
- jongleur Palla at the Burgos court of Alfonso VII of León

== Works published ==
1150:

- Geoffrey of Monmouth's Vita Merlini, an adoption of the Welsh tales of Merlin (approx.)

1154:

- Shika Wakashū, a Japanese imperial poetry anthology, completed

1155:

- Roman de Brut by Wace (approx.)
- Ensenhamen de la donzela by Garin lo Brun (poss.)

1157:

- The Kakawin Bhāratayuddha, a Javanese retelling of stories from the Mahabharata

== Births ==
Death years link to the corresponding "[year] in poetry" article. There are conflicting or unreliable sources for the birth years of many people born in this period; where sources conflict, the poet is listed again and the conflict is noted:

1150:

- Folquet de Marselha (died 1231), Occitan troubadour
- Dalfi d'Alvernha (died 1234/1235), Count, troubadour and patron of troubadours
- Conon de Béthune (died 1219), crusader and trouvère

1153:

- Kamo no Chōmei (died 1216), Japanese author, poet (waka), and essayist

1154:

- Benoît de Sainte-Maure (died 1173), Anglo-Norman poet

1155:

- Jiang Kui (died 1221), Chinese poet, composer and calligrapher of the Song dynasty
- Jien (died 1225), Japanese poet, historian, and Buddhist monk
- William I of Baux (died 1218), French nobleman and troubadour

1157:

- Alfonso II of Aragon (died 1196), an Occitan troubadour
- Richard I of England (died 1199), Poitevin and Occitan poet

1158:

- Fujiwara no Ietaka (died 1237), Japanese Kamakura period waka poet

== Deaths ==
Birth years link to the corresponding "[year] in poetry" article:

1151:

- Li Qingzhao (born 1084), Chinese writer and poet of the Song dynasty

1155:

- Geoffrey of Monmouth (born 1100), British clergyman whose Latin writings included early versions of the Merlin (King Arthur) epic

1156:

- Garin lo Brun (born unknown), early Auvergnat troubadour

1157:

- Falaki Shirvani (born 1107), Persian

== See also ==
- Poetry
- 12th century in poetry
- 12th century in literature
- List of years in poetry

Other events:

- Other events of the 12th century
- Other events of the 13th century

12th century:

- 12th century in poetry
- 12th century in literature
