= 1000s in poetry =

Nationality words link to articles with information on the nation's poetry or literature (for instance, Irish or France).

== Events ==
1005 – 1007:

- Compilation of the Shūi Wakashū, the third imperial Japanese poetry anthology

== Births ==
Death years link to the corresponding "[year] in poetry" article. There are conflicting or unreliable sources for the birth years of many people born in this period; where sources conflict, the poet is listed again and the conflict is noted:

1001:

- Wallada bint al-Mustakfi (died 1091), Arab Andalusian poet of Arabic language

1002:

- Mei Yaochen (died 1060), Song poet

1003:

- Ibn Zaydún (died 1071), Arabic poet

1004:

- Nasir Khusraw (died 1088), Persian poet

1006:

- Khwaja Abdullah Ansari (died 1088), Afghan poet, also known as "Shaikul Mashayekh" (Arabic: شیخ المشایخ) [Master of (Sufi) Masters]

1007:

- Ouyang Xiu (died 1072), Chinese statesman, historian, essayist and poet of the Song dynasty

1009:

- Qatran Tabrizi (died 1072), Persian poet

== Deaths ==
Birth years link to the corresponding "[year] in poetry" article:

1001:

- Wang Yucheng (born 954), Song poet

1007:

- Badi' al-Zaman al-Hamadhani (born 967), master of Arabic prose

1008:

- Gunnlaugr ormstunga (born 983), Icelandic skald, from injuries sustained after defeating skald Hrafn Önundarson in battle.

== See also ==
- Poetry
- 11th century in poetry
- 11th century in literature
- List of years in poetry

Other events:

- Other events of the 12th century
- Other events of the 13th century

11th century:

- 11th century in poetry
- 11th century in literature
