= 1130s in poetry =

Nationality words link to articles with information on the nation's poetry or literature (for instance, Irish or France).

== Events ==
1136:

- Jongleur Palla at the Toledo court of Alfonso VII of León

== Works published ==
1130:

- Earliest likely date for works of Gwalchmai ap Meilyr

1133:

- Man Jiang Hong written by Yue Fei

1137:

- Li coronemenz Looïs possibly written

== Births ==
Death years link to the corresponding "[year] in poetry" article. There are conflicting or unreliable sources for the birth years of many people born in this period; where sources conflict, the poet is listed again and the conflict is noted:

1130:

- Guilhem de Berguedan (died 1196), troubadour
- Owain Cyfeiliog (died 1197), one of the Welsh Poets of the Princes
- Akka Mahadevi (died 1160), writer of Vachana sahitya didactic poetry
- Tibors de Sarenom (died 1198), trobairitz
- Eugenius of Palermo (died 1202), amiratus (admiral), translator, and poet
- Zhu Xi (died 1200), Confucian scholar, writer, and poet

1134:

- Basava (died 1196), writing in Kannada

1135:

- Zhu Shuzhen (died 1180), Chinese poet of the Song dynasty

1138:

- Giraut de Bornelh (died 1215), French troubadour whose his skill earned him the nickname of "Master of the Troubadours"

1139:

- Jakuren (died 1202), Japanese Buddhist priest and poet

== Deaths ==
Birth years link to the corresponding "[year] in poetry" article:

1130:

- Baldric of Dol (born 1050), abbot who wrote epitaphs, riddles, epistolary, and long form poems

1131:

- December 4: Omar Khayyám (born 1048), Persian polymath, mathematician, philosopher, astronomer and poet
- Sanai (born 1080), Persian (approx.)

1137:

- Meilyr Brydydd, one of the Welsh Poets of the Princes

1138:

- Ibn Khafajah, died this year or 1139 (born 1058) Arabic-language poet in Al-Andalus (Spain)

== See also ==
- Poetry
- 12th century in poetry
- 12th century in literature
- List of years in poetry

Other events:

- Other events of the 12th century
- Other events of the 13th century

12th century:

- 12th century in poetry
- 12th century in literature
