= 1070s in poetry =

Nationality words link to articles with information on the nation's poetry or literature (for instance, Irish or France).

== Events ==
1075:

- Compilation of the Goshūi Wakashū, the fourth imperial Japanese poetry anthology, begun

== Works published ==
1077:

- Nam quốc sơn hà (Mountains and Rivers of the Southern Country), asserting the sovereignty of Vietnam's rulers over its lands

== Births ==
Death years link to the corresponding "[year] in poetry" article. There are conflicting or unreliable sources for the birth years of many people born in this period; where sources conflict, the poet is listed again and the conflict is noted:

1071:

- William IX, Duke of Aquitaine (died 1126), an early Occitan Troubadour

1075:

- Yehuda Halevi (died 1141), Hebrew poet in Al-Andalus

1078:

- Ibn Quzman (died 1160), Spanish writer of classical poetry, especially zéjeles

1079:

- Peter Abelard (died 1142), French, writing in Latin

== Deaths ==
Birth years link to the corresponding "[year] in poetry" article:

1071:

- Ibn Zaydún (born 1003), Arabic poet

1072:

- Ouyang Xiu (born 1007), Chinese statesman, historian, essayist and poet
- Asadi Tusi (born unknown), Persian
- Azraqi (born unknown), Persian
- Qatran Tabrizi (born 1009), Persian

1077:

- Shao Yong (born 1011), Song Chinese philosopher, cosmologist, poet and historian

1078:

- Michael Psellos (born 1017), Byzantine poet and historian (d. after this date)

== See also ==
- Poetry
- 11th century in poetry
- 11th century in literature
- List of years in poetry

Other events:

- Other events of the 12th century
- Other events of the 13th century

11th century:

- 11th century in poetry
- 11th century in literature
