= 1180s in poetry =

Nationality words link to articles with information on the nation's poetry or literature (for instance, Irish or France).

== Events ==
1181:

- Bertran de Born's first datable poem, a sirventes

1183:

- Ordering of the Senzai Wakashū, an imperial Japanese poetry anthology
- Bertran de Born composes a planh, "Mon chan fenisc ab dol et ab maltraire", on the death of Henry the Young King (on June 11). Rigaut de Berbezill composes another, "Si tuit li dol e.l plor e.l marrimen", as does Peire Raimon de Tolosa
- Joseph of Exeter largely completes writing his Latin epic De bello Troiano

1187:

- Compilation of the Senzai Wakashū, ordered in 1183

== Works published ==
1180:

- Approx. date of Khusraw and Shirin by Nezami

== Births ==
Death years link to the corresponding "[year] in poetry" article. There are conflicting or unreliable sources for the birth years of many people born in this period; where sources conflict, the poet is listed again and the conflict is noted:

1180:

- August 6 – Emperor Go-Toba (died 1239), Japanese Emperor, calligrapher, painter, musician, poet, critic and editor
- September 4 – Raimbaut de Vaqueiras (died 1207), Provençal troubadour and knight
- Kambar (died 1250), medieval Tamil poet, author of the Ramavataram
- Peire Cardenal (died 1278), Occitan troubadour

1181:

- March 22 – Ibn al-Farid (died 1235), Arabic Sufi poet

1183:

- Approximate date – Qul Ghali (died 1236), Muslim Volga Bulgarian Old Tatar poet

1184:

- Sa‘di (died 1283/1291), Persian poet
- Ahmad al-Tifashi (died 1253), Arabic poet, writer and anthologist, in Tunisia

1186:

- November 2 – Baha' al-din Zuhair (died 1258), Arabian poet

== Deaths ==
Birth years link to the corresponding "[year] in poetry" article:

1180:

- Minamoto no Yorimasa (born 1106), Japanese poet
- John Tzetzes (born 1110), Byzantine
- Zhu Shuzhen (born 1135), Chinese poet of the Song dynasty

1181:

- Serlo of Wilton (born c.1105), English-born Latin poet and abbot

1183:

- Wace (born 1115), Anglo-Norman poet and author of the Roman de Brut and Roman de Rou

1187:

- November 9 – Emperor Gaozong of the Song dynasty (born 1107)

1189:

- Anvari (born 1126), Persian

== See also ==
- Poetry
- 12th century in poetry
- 12th century in literature
- List of years in poetry

Other events:

- Other events of the 12th century
- Other events of the 13th century

12th century:

- 12th century in poetry
- 12th century in literature
