= 1060s in poetry =

This article covers 1060s in poetry. Nationality words link to articles with information on the nation's poetry or literature (for instance, Irish or France).

== Events ==
c.1069

- Song poet and reforming official Wang Anshi removes poetry writing from the Imperial examination for the Chinese civil service

== Births ==
Death years link to the corresponding "[year] in poetry" article. There are conflicting or unreliable sources for the birth years of many people born in this period; where sources conflict, the poet is listed again and the conflict is noted:

1060:

- Ava (died 1127), German poet

== Deaths ==
Birth years link to the corresponding "[year] in poetry" article:

1060:

- Mei Yaochen (born 1002), Song poet

1067:

- Cai Xiang (born 1012), Song poet, calligrapher, scholar, official and structural engineer

== See also ==
- Poetry
- 11th century in poetry
- 11th century in literature
- List of years in poetry

Other events:

- Other events of the 12th century
- Other events of the 13th century

11th century:

- 11th century in poetry
- 11th century in literature
