= 1040s in poetry =

This article covers 1040s in poetry.

== Births ==
1040:

- Muhammad Ibn Abbad Al Mutamid (died 1095), Arabic poet in Al-Andalus

1046:

- Masud Sa'd Salman (died 1121), Persian

1048:

- May 31: Omar Khayyám (died 1123), Persian polymath, mathematician, philosopher, astronomer and poet
- Mu'izzi (died 1125), Persian
- Am'aq (died 1148), Persian that carried the title amir al-shu'ara ("Amir of poets")

== Deaths ==
1040:

- Unsuri (born unknown), Persian poet of the royal court, given the title Malik-us Shu'ara (King of Poets')
- Asjadi (born unknown), Persian
- Manuchehri (born unknown), Persian, later a royal poet in the court of Sultan Shihab ud-Dawlah Mas'ud I of Ghazni

1041:

- Akazome Emon 赤染衛門 (born 956), Japanese waka poet who lived in the mid-Heian period; a member of both the Thirty-six Elder Poetic Sages and Fujiwara no Kintō's 36 female poetry immortals (or "sages") of the Kamakura period (surname: Akazome)
- Fujiwara no Kintō (born 966), Japanese poet, publisher of the Shūi Wakashū; he created the concept of the Thirty-six Poetry Immortals

1049:

- Abū-Sa'īd Abul-Khayr (born 967), Persian
- Uthman Mukhtari (born unknown), Persian

== See also ==
- Poetry
- 11th century in poetry
- 11th century in literature
- List of years in poetry

Other events:

- Other events of the 12th century
- Other events of the 13th century

11th century:

- 11th century in poetry
- 11th century in literature
