= 1120s in poetry =

Nationality words link to articles with information on the nation's poetry or literature (for instance, Irish or France).

== Events ==
1124:

- First draft of the Kin'yō Wakashū, an imperial Japanese poetry anthology, completed

1127:

- Second and final draft of the Kin'yō Wakashū, an imperial Japanese poetry anthology, completed

== Births ==
Death years link to the corresponding "[year] in poetry" article. There are conflicting or unreliable sources for the birth years of many people born in this period; where sources conflict, the poet is listed again and the conflict is noted:

1121:

- Khaqani (died 1190), (approx.) Persian

1125:

- Lu You (died 1210), Chinese Song dynasty poet

1126:

- Fan Chengda (died 1193), Song
- Anvari (died 1189), Persian

1127:

- Yang Wanli (died 1206), Chinese Song dynasty poet

1128:

- Alain de Lille (died 1202), French theologian and poet, writing in Latin
- Ruzbihan Baqli (died 1209), Persian poet, mystic, and sufi

== Deaths ==
Birth years link to the corresponding "[year] in poetry" article:

1121:

- Masud Sa'd Salman (born 1046), Persian

1123:

- December 4 - Omar Khayyám (born 1048), Persian mathematician, philosopher, astronomer and presumed poet
- Fujiwara no Akisue (born 1055), Japan

1125:

- Mu'izzi (born 1048), Persian poet laureate of Sanjar, master of the Persian panegyric qasideh

1126:

- William IX of Aquitaine (born 1071), an early Occitan troubador

1127:

- February 7 - Ava (born 1060), German poet

1129:

- Minamoto no Shunrai (born 1057), Japan

== See also ==
- Poetry
- 12th century in poetry
- 12th century in literature
- List of years in poetry

Other events:

- Other events of the 12th century
- Other events of the 13th century

12th century:

- 12th century in poetry
- 12th century in literature
