= 1170s in poetry =

Nationality words link to articles with information on the nation's poetry or literature (for instance, Irish or France).

== Events ==
1170:

- Peire d'Alvernhe probably wrote Chantarai d'aquest trobadors during the summertime at Puivert

1173:

- Giraut de Bornelh composed a planh on the death of Raimbaut of Orange

== Works published ==
Approximate date

- Serlo of Wilton, "Linquo coax ranis"

== Births ==
Death years link to the corresponding "[year] in poetry" article. There are conflicting or unreliable sources for the birth years of many people born in this period; where sources conflict, the poet is listed again and the conflict is noted:

1170:

- Gaucelm Faidit (died 1202), Occitan troubadour (approx.)
- Hartmann von Aue (died 1210), German poet of the Middle High German period
- Wolfram von Eschenbach (died 1220), German knight and poet; as a Minnesinger, he also wrote lyric poetry
- Pons d'Ortaffa (died 1246), Catalan nobleman and troubadour
- Sighvatr Sturluson (died 1238), skald poet, goði and member of the Icelandic Sturlungar clan
- Walther von der Vogelweide (died 1230), Middle High German lyric poet

1171:

- Fujiwara Toshinari no Musume (died 1253), a Japanese poet (approx.)

1172:

- Shota Rustaveli (died 1216), Georgian poet

1173:

- Huguet de Mataplana (died 1213), troubadour, dies of wounds received in the Battle of Muret
- Kolbeinn Tumason (died 1208), Icelandic skald, composed Heyr himna smiður (Hear, Heavenly Creator)

1175:

- Peire Vidal (died 1205), Occitan troubadour (approx.)
- Henry I of Rodez (died 1221), French troubadour

1176:

- Elazar Rokeach (died 1238), a Talmudist, Cabalist, moralist, scientist and poet

1177:

- Gyōi (died 1217), Japanese poet and Buddhist monk
- Lal Shahbaz Qalander (died 1274), sufi saint, philosopher, poet, and qalandar
- Najmeddin Razi (died 1256), Persian Sufi

1178:

- Snorri Sturluson (died 1241), Icelandic poet

== Deaths ==
Birth years link to the corresponding "[year] in poetry" article:

1170:

- Hywel ab Owain Gwynedd (born unknown), Welsh
- Eliezer ben Nathan (born 1090), in Hebrew

1171:

- Dietmar von Aist (born 1140), an early Minnesänger (possible)
- Rabbeinu Tam (born 1100), Hebrew liturgical poet, in France

1173:

- Raimbaut of Orange (born 1147), Occitan troubadour
- Benoît de Sainte-Maure (born unknown), Anglo-Norman

1178:

- Bernard Silvestris (born 1085), a Latin poet in France (approx.)

== See also ==
- Poetry
- 12th century in poetry
- 12th century in literature
- List of years in poetry

Other events:

- Other events of the 12th century
- Other events of the 13th century

12th century:

- 12th century in poetry
- 12th century in literature
