= 1100s in poetry =

This article covers 1100s in poetry. Nationality words link to articles with information on the nation's poetry or literature (for instance, Irish or France).

== Births ==
Death years link to the corresponding "[year] in poetry" article. There are conflicting or unreliable sources for the birth years of many people born in this period; where sources conflict, the poet is listed again and the conflict is noted:

1100:

- Rabbeinu Tam (died 1171), Hebrew rabbi and liturgical poet, in France
- Geoffrey of Monmouth (died 1155), Welsh cleric whose Latin writings include early versions of the Merlin (King Arthur) epic

1103:

- Yue Fei (died 1142), Chinese Song dynasty poet

1105:

- Basava (died 1167), Indian Kannada language Vachana sahitya poet

1106:

- Khwaja Ahmad Yasavi (died 1166), Turkish poet
- Minamoto no Yorimasa (died 1180), Japanese poet

1107:

- June 12 – Emperor Gaozong of Song (died 1187) Chinese poet
- Falaki Shirvani (died 1157), Persian poet

== Deaths ==
Birth years link to the corresponding "[year] in poetry" article:

1101:

- Su Shi (born 1037), Song dynasty writer, poet, artist, calligrapher, pharmacologist, and statesman

== See also ==
- Poetry
- 12th century in poetry
- 12th century in literature
- List of years in poetry

Other events:

- Other events of the 12th century
- Other events of the 13th century

12th century:

- 12th century in poetry
- 12th century in literature
