= 1020s in poetry =

This article covers 1020s in poetry. Nationality words link to articles with information on the nation's poetry or literature (for instance, Irish or France).

== Births ==
Death years link to the corresponding "[year] in poetry" article. There are conflicting or unreliable sources for the birth years of many people born in this period; where sources conflict, the poet is listed again and the conflict is noted:

1021:

- Solomon ibn Gabirol (died 1058), Hebrew poet in Al-Andalus
- Wang Anshi (died 1086), Song poet

== Deaths ==
Birth years link to the corresponding "[year] in poetry" article:

1020:

- Ferdowsi (born c. 940), Persian poet and writer

== See also ==
- Poetry
- 11th century in poetry
- 11th century in literature
- List of years in poetry

Other events:

- Other events of the 12th century
- Other events of the 13th century

11th century:

- 11th century in poetry
- 11th century in literature
