= 1080s in poetry =

Nationality words link to articles with information on the nation's poetry or literature (for instance, Irish or France).

== Events ==
1086:

- Compilation of the Goshūi Wakashū, the fourth imperial Japanese poetry anthology, completed

== Works produced ==
1087:

- "The Rime of King William"

== Births ==
Death years link to the corresponding "[year] in poetry" article. There are conflicting or unreliable sources for the birth years of many people born in this period; where sources conflict, the poet is listed again, and the conflict is noted:

1080:

- Sanai (died 1131), Persian Sufi poet

1084:

- Li Qingzhao (died 1151), Song

1085:

- Bernard Silvestris (died 1148), a Latin poet in France

1089:

- Abraham ibn Ezra (died 1164), Hebrew poet in Al-Andalus

== Deaths ==
Birth years link to the corresponding "[year] in poetry" article:

1083:

- Zeng Gong (born 1019), Song poet, scholar and historian

1086:

- Muhammad ibn Ammar (born 1031), Arabic poet, ruler and chess player in Al-Andalus (killed for treachery)
- Wang Anshi (born 1021), Song economist, statesman, chancellor and poet

1088:

- Nasir Khusraw (born 1004), Persian poet, philosopher, scholar and traveler
- Khwaja Abdullah Ansari (born 1006), Afghan poet, also known as "Shaikul Mashayekh" (Arabic: شیخ المشایخ) [Master of (Sufi) Masters]

1089:

- Isaac ibn Ghiyyat (born 1038), a Hebrew poet in al-Andalus

== See also ==
- Poetry
- 11th century in poetry
- 11th century in literature
- List of years in poetry

Other events:

- Other events of the 12th century
- Other events of the 13th century

11th century:

- 11th century in poetry
- 11th century in literature
