= 1030s in poetry =

This article covers 1030s in poetry. Nationality words link to articles with information on the nation's poetry or literature (for instance, Irish or France).

== Works published ==
- Resalat Al-Ghufran by Al-Ma'arri

== Births ==
Death years link to the corresponding "[year] in poetry" article. There are conflicting or unreliable sources for the birth years of many people born in this period; where sources conflict, the poet is listed again and the conflict is noted:

1031:

- Muhammad ibn Ammar (died 1086), Arabic poet in Al-Andalus

1037:

- Su Shi (died 1101), major poet of the Song dynasty

1038:

- Isaac ibn Ghiyyat (died 1089), a Hebrew poet in al-Andalus

== Deaths ==
Birth years link to the corresponding "[year] in poetry" article:

1037:

- Farrukhi Sistani (born unknown), Persian poet

== See also ==
- Poetry
- 11th century in poetry
- 11th century in literature
- List of years in poetry

Other events:

- Other events of the 12th century
- Other events of the 13th century

11th century:

- 11th century in poetry
- 11th century in literature
