= 1010s in poetry =

Nationality words link to articles with information on the nation's poetry or literature (for instance, Irish or France).

== Events ==
1010:

- March 8 - Persian poet Ferdowsi finishes writing the Shahnameh (Book of Kings) which will be regarded as the national epic of the greater Iranian culture.

== Births ==
Death years link to the corresponding "[year] in poetry" article. There are conflicting or unreliable sources for the birth years of many people born in this period; where sources conflict, the poet is listed again and the conflict is noted:

1011:

- Shao Yong (died 1077), Song Chinese philosopher, cosmologist, poet and historian

1012:

- Cai Xiang (died 1067), Song poet scholar and vizier of the Seljuq Empire

1018:

- Nizam al-Mulk (died 1092), Persian
- Michael Psellos born 1017 or 1018 (died 1078), Byzantine poet and historian (1017 or 1018)

1019:

- Zeng Gong (died 1083), Song poet

== Deaths ==
Birth years link to the corresponding "[year] in poetry" article: 1012:

- Shams al-Mo'ali Abol-hasan Ghaboos ibn Wushmgir (born unknown), author of the Qabus nama

== See also ==
- Poetry
- 11th century in poetry
- 11th century in literature
- List of years in poetry

Other events:

- Other events of the 12th century
- Other events of the 13th century

11th century:

- 11th century in poetry
- 11th century in literature
