= 1224 in poetry =

This article covers 1224 in poetry.

== Deaths ==
- Judah Messer Leon (born 1166), French Jewish poet and Rabbi, writing in Hebrew and Aramaic

== See also ==
- Poetry
- List of years in poetry
