= 1110s in poetry =

Nationality words link to articles with information on the nation's poetry or literature (for instance, Irish or France).

== Events ==
- 1111: After Norman conquest of England, begins the rapid descent of the Anglo-Saxon language as a written literary language

== Works published ==
- Tombstone inscription of Vekenega (d. 1111), head of the Benedictine convent of St. Mary in Zadar, is written on four tablets with 20 verses (hexameters and elegiac couplets), in which an unknown poet credits Vekenega's work for the convent

== Births ==
Death years link to the corresponding "[year] in poetry" article. There are conflicting or unreliable sources for the birth years of many people born in this period; where sources conflict, the poet is listed again and the conflict is noted:

1110:

- John Tzetzes (died 1180), Byzantine

1114:

- Fujiwara no Shunzei (died 1204), Japanese poet and nobleman

1115:

- Wace (died 1183), Anglo-Norman author of Roman de Brut and Roman de Rou

1118:

- Saigyō Hōshi (died 1190), Japan

== Deaths ==
Birth years link to the corresponding "[year] in poetry" article:

== See also ==
- Poetry
- 12th century in poetry
- 12th century in literature
- List of years in poetry

Other events:

- Other events of the 12th century
- Other events of the 13th century

12th century:

- 12th century in poetry
- 12th century in literature
