= 1223 in poetry =

This article covers 1223 in poetry.

== Deaths ==
- Einion ap Gwalchmai (born unknown), one of the Welch Poets of the Princes (approx.)
- Alamanda de Castelnau (born 1160), trobairitz

== See also ==
- Poetry
- List of years in poetry
