= 1235 in poetry =

This article covers 1235 in poetry.

== Works ==
- Fujiwara no Teika, editor, Ogura Hyakunin Isshu, an anthology of 100 Japanese poems, each by a different poet; is compiled about this year; the popularity of the anthology has endured to the present day, and a Japanese card game, Uta-garuta, uses cards with the poems printed on it.

== Births ==
- Guittone d'Arezzo, founder of the Tuscan School (died 1294) (approximate date)

== Deaths ==
- 23 January – Ibn al-Farid, Arabic Sufi poet (born 1181)
- Dalfi d'Alvernha, Count, troubadour and patron of troubadours (born 1150) (died 1234 or 1235)
