= 1050s in poetry =

This article covers 1050s in poetry. Nationality words link to articles with information on the nation's poetry or literature (for instance, Irish or France).

== Births ==
Death years link to the corresponding "[year] in poetry" article. There are conflicting or unreliable sources for the birth years of many people born in this period; where sources conflict, the poet is listed again and the conflict is noted:

1050:

- Baldric of Dol (died 1130), abbot who wrote epitaphs, riddles, epistolary, and long form poems

1055:

- Fujiwara no Akisue (died 1123), Japanese poet and nobleman

1057:

- Minamoto no Shunrai (died 1129), Japanese poet

1058

- Ibn Khafajah, (died 1138 or 1139) Arabic-language poet in Al-Andalus (Spain)

== Deaths ==
Birth years link to the corresponding "[year] in poetry" article:

1050:

- Baba Kuhi, Persian Sufi poet

1053:

- Liu Yong (born 987), Song poet

1056:

- Samuel ibn Naghrela (born 993), Hebrew poet in Al-Andalus

1057:

- Al-Ma'arri (born 973), blind Arab philosopher, poet and writer

1058:

- Solomon ibn Gabirol (born 1021), Hebrew poet in Al-Andalus

== See also ==
- Poetry
- 11th century in poetry
- 11th century in literature
- List of years in poetry

Other events:

- Other events of the 12th century
- Other events of the 13th century

11th century:

- 11th century in poetry
- 11th century in literature
