= 1294 in poetry =

== Events ==
- Chiaro Davanzati serves as captain of Or San Michele
- Guittone d'Arezzo founds the Neo-Sicilian School based on the Sicilian School under Frederick II (for more detail see sonnet)

== Births ==
- Zhu Derun (died 1365), Chinese painter and poet in Yuan Dynasty

== Deaths ==
- al-Busiri (born 1211), Egyptian poet
- Guittone d'Arezzo (born 1235), founder of the Tuscan School
- Brunetto Latini (born 1220), Florentine philosopher, poet, scholar and statesman
