= 1090s in poetry =

This article covers 1090s in poetry. Nationality words link to articles with information on the nation's poetry or literature (for instance, Irish or France).

== Births ==
Death years link to the corresponding "[year] in poetry" article. There are conflicting or unreliable sources for the birth years of many people born in this period; where sources conflict, the poet is listed again and the conflict is noted:

1090:

- Eliezer ben Nathan (died 1170), halakist and liturgical poet, in Hebrew

1092:

- Abraham ibn Ezra (died 1164), Hebrew poet in Al-Andalus

1098:

- Hildegard of Bingen (died 1179), German writer, composer, philosopher, Christian mystic, Benedictine abbess, visionary, polymath, poet, and producer of miniature Illuminations

== Deaths ==
Birth years link to the corresponding "[year] in poetry" article:

1091:

- March 26 – Wallada bint al-Mustakfi (born 1001), Arab Andalusian poet of Arabic language

1092:

- Nizam al-Mulk (born 1018), Persian scholar and vizier of the Seljuq Empire

1095:

- Abu l-Hasan al-Husri
- Muhammad Ibn Abbad Al Mutamid (born 1040), Arabic poet in Al-Andalus

== See also ==
- Poetry
- 11th century in poetry
- 11th century in literature
- List of years in poetry

Other events:

- Other events of the 12th century
- Other events of the 13th century

11th century:

- 11th century in poetry
- 11th century in literature
