= 1234 in poetry =

This article covers 1234 in poetry.

== Deaths ==
- Dalfi d'Alvernha, Count, troubadour and patron of troubadours (born 1150) (died 1234 or 1235)
- Pacificus, poet laureate at the Court of Frederick II, Holy Roman Emperor; later becoming a disciple of St. Francis of Assisi
