= 1259 in poetry =

This article covers 1259 in poetry.

== Events ==
- Retired Emperor Go-Saga orders a new imperial anthology of Japanese waka poetry. It will be completed in 1265 by Fujiwara no Tameie, with assistance from Fujiwara no Motoie, Fujiwara no Ieyoshi, Fujiwara no Yukiee, and Fujiwara no Mitsutoshi and titled Shokukokin Wakashū (続古今和歌集, "Collection of Ancient and Modern Times Continued"), consisting of twenty volumes containing 1,925 poems.

== Deaths ==
- Óláfr Þórðarson (born 1210), Icelandic skald
- Jehan Erart (born 1200), trouvère
