= 1293 in poetry =

This article covers 1293 in poetry.

== Events ==
- March 3 – The poet-emperor Trần Nhân Tông ends his reign as third emperor of the Trần dynasty and became Taishang Huang (Thái thượng hoàng)

== Works ==
- Dante completes writing La Vita Nuova

== Deaths ==
- May 2 – Meir of Rothenburg (born 1215), German rabbi and poet, a major author of the tosafot on Rashi's commentary on the Talmud
