= 1297 in poetry =

This article covers 1297 in poetry.

== Deaths ==
- Willem van Afflighem (born c. 1210), Flemish poet and abbot at Sint-Truiden
