= 1190s in poetry =

Nationality words link to articles with information on the nation's poetry or literature (for instance, Irish or France).

== Events ==
1195:

- Folquet de Marselha gives up poetry to take up the religious life

1197:

- Salh d'Escola enters a cloister in Bergerac and gives up composing

1198:

- Bertran de Born's last datable poem

1199:

- Gaucelm Faidit composes a planh on the death of Richard I of England

== Works published ==
1190:

- Probable approx. date of The Tale of Igor's Campaign (Old Ukrainian: Слово о пълку Игорєвѣ, Slovo o pŭlku Igorevě)

Nizami Ganjavi, volumes of Khamsa of Nizami, Classical Persian poetry

- Leyli o Majnun (لیلی و مجنون, 'Layla and Majnun'), c. 1192
- Iskandarnameh (اسکندرنامه, 'The Book of Alexander'), 1194 or 1196–1202
- Haft Peykar (هفت پیکر, 'The Seven Beauties'), 1197

== Births ==
Death years link to the corresponding "[year] in poetry" article. There are conflicting or unreliable sources for the birth years of many people born in this period; where sources conflict, the poet is listed again and the conflict is noted:

1190:

- Gonzalo de Berceo (died 1264), Spanish poet especially on religious themes
- Pietro della Vigna (died 1249), Italian jurist, diplomat, poet, and sonneteer of the Sicilian School
- Yuan Haowen (died 1257), Chinese Sanqu poetry writer

1191:

- Janna (died unknown), Kannada poet

1193:

- Shang Dao (died 1258), Chinese Sanqu poet

1196:

- Alberico da Romano (died 1260), patron and troubadour

1198:

- Fujiwara no Tameie (died 1275), Japanese poet

== Deaths ==
Birth years link to the corresponding "[year] in poetry" article:

1190:

- Khaqani Shirvani (born 1121/1122), Persian
- Saigyō Hōshi (born 1118), Japan

1193:

- Fan Chengda (born 1126), Song

1196:

- Alfonso II of Aragon (born 1157), an Occitan troubadour
- Basava (born 1134), writing in Kannada
- Guilhem de Berguedan (born 1130), troubadour

1197:

- Henry VI, Holy Roman Emperor (born 1165)
- Owain Cyfeiliog (born 1130), one of the Welsh Poets of the Princes
- Ermengarde, Viscountess of Narbonne, patron of troubadours

1198:

- Tibors de Sarenom (born 1130), trobairitz

1199:

- April 6 – Richard I of England (born 1157), Poitevin and Occitan poet

== See also ==
- Poetry
- 12th century in poetry
- 12th century in literature
- List of years in poetry

Other events:

- Other events of the 12th century
- Other events of the 13th century

12th century:

- 12th century in poetry
- 12th century in literature
