= 1222 in poetry =

== Deaths ==
- Heinrich von Morungen died 1220 or 1222 (born unknown), a German Minnesänger
- Maria de Ventadorn (born unknown), an Occitan troubadour

== See also ==
- Poetry
- List of years in poetry
