= Al-Abharī =

Al-Abharī is toponymic surname from Abhar, a city in Zanjan province, Iran. It may refer to:

- Muhammad al-Abhari – The Iraqi Maliki scholar (died 996)
- Athīr al-Dīn al-Abharī (died 1265), Iranian philosopher, astronomer, physicist, astrologer, and mathematician
- Amīn al-Dīn al-Abharī (died 1332)
