= 1219 in poetry =

== Deaths ==
- Dec. 17: Conon de Béthune died 1219 or 1220 (born 1150), crusader and trouvère

== See also ==
- Poetry
- List of years in poetry
