= 1221 in poetry =

== Events ==
- The troubadour Peirol pilgrimaged to Jerusalem.

== Births ==
- 23 November – Alfonso X of Castile, Castilian monarch and writer of Galician-Portuguese lyrics (died 1284)
- Willem van Afflighem, Flemish poet and abbot at Sint-Truiden (died 1297)

== Deaths ==
- Jiang Kui, Chinese poet, composer and calligrapher of the Song dynasty (born 1155)
- April – Attar Neyshapuri, Persian Muslim poet, theoretician of Sufism, and hagiographer (born 1145)

== See also ==
- Poetry
- List of years in poetry
