= The Rime of King William =

Old English poem on William the Conqueror

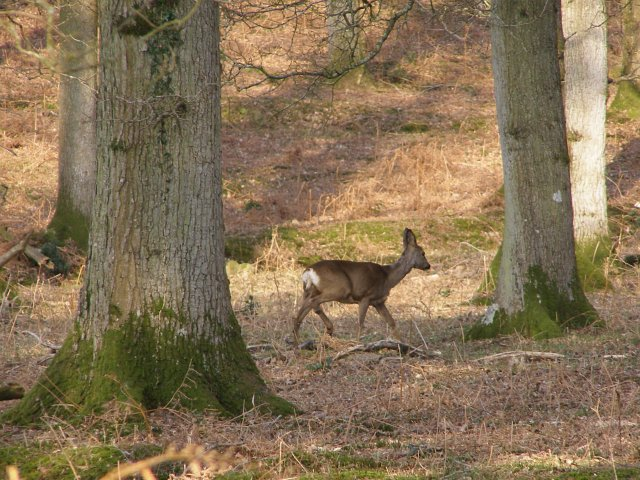
Roe deer in the New Forest, which was established by King William. (He sætte mycel deorfrið [...] He forbead þa heortas)

"The Rime of King William" is an Old English poem that tells the death of William the Conqueror. The Rime was a part of the only entry for the year of 1087 (though improperly dated 1086) in the "Peterborough Chronicle/Laud Manuscript." In this entry there is a thorough history and account of the life of King William. The entry in its entirety is regarded "as containing the best contemporary estimate of William's achievements and character as seen by a reasonably objective Englishman" (Bartlett, 89). As a resource, earlier writers drew from this in a more literal sense, while later historians referred to it more liberally. The text in its original language can be found in The Peterborough Chronicle 1070–1154, edited by Cecily Clark. A modern translation can be found in the Anglo-Saxon Chronicles translated by G.N. Garmonsway. Seth Lerer has published a more recent modern translation of "The Rime of King William" in his article, "Old English and Its Afterlife," in The Cambridge History of Medieval English Literature.

== Text and translation ==
Castelas he let wyrcean,
⁊ earme men swiðe swencean.
Se cyng wæs swa swiðe stearc,
⁊ benam of his underþeoddan manig marc
goldes ⁊ ma hundred punda seolfres.
-Det he nam be wihte
⁊ mid micelan unrihte
of his landleode,
for litte[l]re neode.
He wæs on gitsunge befeallan,
⁊ grædinæsse he lufode mid ealle
He sætte mycel deorfrið,
⁊ he lægde laga þærwið
þet swa hwa swa sloge heort oððe hinde,
þet hine man sceolde blendian.
He forbead þa heortas,
swylce eac þa baras.
Swa swiðe he lufode þa headeor
swilce he wære heora fæder.
Eac he sætte be þam haran
þet hi mosten freo faran.
His rice men hit mændon,
⁊ þa earme men hit beceorodan;
ac he [wæs] swa stið
þet he ne rohte heora eallra nið.
Ac hi moston mid ealle
þes cynges wille folgian,
gif hi woldon libban,
oððe land habban,
land oððe eahta,
oððe wel his sehta.
Walawa, þet ænig man
sceolde modigan swa,
hine sylf upp ahebban
⁊ ofer ealle men tellan.
Se ælmihtiga God cyþæ his saule mildheortnisse,
⁊ do him his synna forgifenesse!

Translation:

He had castles built
and poor men terribly oppressed.
The king was severe
and he took many marks of gold and
hundreds of pounds of silver from his underlings.
All this he took from the people,
and with great injustice
from his subjects,
out of trivial desire.
He had fallen into avarice
and he loved greediness above everything else
He established many deer preserves
and he set up many laws concerning them
such that whoever killed a hart or a hind
should be blinded.
He forbade (hunting of) harts
and also of boars.
He loved the wild deer
as if he were their father.
And he also decreed that the hares
should be allowed to run free.
His great men complained of it,
and his poor men lamented it;
but he was so severe
that he ignored all their needs.
But they had to follow above all else
the king's will,
if they wanted to live
or hold on to land,
land or property (or esteem)
or have his good favour.
Woe, that any man
should be so proud
as to raise himself up
and reckon himself above all men.
May almighty God show mercy on his soul
and forgive him his sins.

== Summary ==
The Rime itself is short, and is more of a criticism of King William rather than praise of his reign. It also acts as a summation of that year's entry. The author appears to have chosen a few points that he may have found particularly interesting and turned them into a poem within the entry for the year. The poem is somewhere between 17 and 32 lines long, depending on whether an editor arranges it according to Old English alliterative meter or as rhyming couplets.

== Authorship ==
The author of this Rime, as with many Old English texts, is unknown, but the author does offer an important detail earlier in his entry. "The one definite piece of information which he gives is that he was a member of William's household" (Whiting, 91–92).

Þonne wille we be him awritan swa swa we hine ageaton, Þe him on locodon an ore on his hirede weredon.
[Then shall he write of him, as we have known him, who have ourselves seen him and at time dwelt in his court.] (Garmonsway, 219)

So, at one point the author was a member of the royal household. When and for how long is not sure. Beyond this, there are no other facts offered but it is safe to assume that the author was a monk or a member of a religious house.

== Artistic criticism ==
This poem has been criticized for being immature and "a garbled attempt at rhyming poetry: a poem without regular metre, formalized lineation or coherent imagery" (Lerer, 7). Many other scholars support this criticism. Professors George Philip Krapp and Elliott Van Kirk Dobbie did not include the Rime in their six-volume Anglo Saxon Poetic Records. Its value as a representation of Old English literature as well as the quality of the poem, simply as a poem, is called into question. The end rhyming is unlike the alliterative Old English poetry, which is the basis for most scholarly criticism. Bartlett Whiting refers to the Rime as having "a lack of technical merit," referring to the sudden jump from prose of the formal entry, to that of the "rough and ready verse" (89). With its end-rhymes it is often taken as an example of the transition to Middle English.

== Significance ==
No matter the quality of the Rime's rhymes, the spelling of this Rime was used to age both the text itself as well as chart morphology in Old English texts. Whiting refers to the specific dropping of the final n, indicative of the loss of inflectional endings from Old to Middle English (Whiting, 89).

The poem serves as "an elegy for an age as much as for a king, this entry as a whole constitutes a powerfully literary, and literate, response to the legacies of pre-Conquest English writing" (Lerer, 12). The text offers both the political time line (the twenty first year that William I ruled) and a religious timeline (one thousand eighty-seven years after the birth of Jesus Christ).

Within the form of the lament for King William it expresses the indignation of the English at the introduction of the Norman forest law. Stefan Jurasinski has shown that it is most likely by the compiler of the Peterborough Chronicle himself and that it stands at the head of a developing tradition of literary polemics against the injustice of the forest laws ("The Rime of King William and its Analogues").

== Digital Facsimile Edition and Modern Translation ==
- Foys, Martin et al. Old English Poetry in Facsimile Project (Center for the History of Print and Digital Culture, University of Wisconsin-Madison, 2019-); digital facsimile edition and Modern English translation.
