= Engles =

13th-century Spanish entertainer

Engles (fl. 1253), also spelled Englés, was a Navarrese jongleur and troubadour of the mid 13th century. His lone tenso survives only in fragments and is chiefly of interest to historians for its commentary on court life in Pamplona under Theobald I.

The jongleur with whom Engles is debating is anonymous. The poem has been dated to 1253. First, Engles accuses Theobald of avarice and thriftiness, to which the anonymous replies that Engles—whose name implies that he was English—is anti-French (since Theobald was a Frenchman). Engles finishes the poem by indicating that he is leaving Pamplona for the court of Aragon. Engles makes humorous use of a pun on the words cort (court) and corta (short):

A la cort fuy l'autrier del rey navar, qu'es cort corta de tota cortesia, corta de pres e corta donar e mais corta qu'ieu dire non sabria;	I was the other day at the court of the king of Navarre, which is a court short of all courtliness, short of merit and short of giving and short of everything I could think of to say.

Peire Guilhem de Tolosa also attacked Theobald I of Navarres, who was a prolific trouvère and commissioner of the chansonnier du roi, which includes many troubadour poems.

== Sources ==
- Riquer, Martín de. Los trovadores: historia literaria y textos. 3 vol. Barcelona: Planeta, 1975.
