= 1258 in poetry =

This article covers 1258 in poetry.

== Births ==
- Trần Nhân Tông (died 1308), Vietnamese third emperor of the Trần dynasty who was also a prolific writer and poet

== Deaths ==
- 2 November – Baha al-Din Zuhayr (born 1186), Arabian poet
- Lanfranc Cigala, Genoese nobleman, knight, judge, and man of letters (died 1257 or 1258)
