= 1220 in poetry =

== Events ==
- Troubadour Obs de Biguli entertains at the coronation of the Emperor Frederick II
- Uc de Saint Circ moves first into Provence, then Lombardy, and finally the March of Treviso; in Italy he composes many vidas and razos
- Bertran Folcon d'Avignon and Gui de Cavalhon exchange coblas about the siege of Castelnaudary

== Births ==
- Brunetto Latini (died 1294), Florentine philosopher, poet, scholar and statesman

== Deaths ==
- Wolfram von Eschenbach (born 1170), German knight and poet; as a Minnesinger, he also wrote lyric poetry
- Heinrich von Morungen died 1220 or 1222 (born unknown), a German Minnesänger

== See also ==
- Poetry
- List of years in poetry
