= 1253 in poetry =

This article covers 1253 in poetry.

== Works published ==
- the troubadour Engles and an anonymous jongleur compose a tenso debating the merits of the court of Theobald I of Navarre

== Births ==
- Amir Khusro (died 1325), Sufi, writing in Persian and Hindustani

== Deaths ==
- Fujiwara Toshinari no Musume died 1252 or 1253 (born 1171), Japanese poet
- Ahmad al-Tifashi (born 1184), Arabic poet, writer, and anthologist, in Tunisia
- Theobald I of Navarre (born 1201), a French trouvère
