= 1218 in poetry =

== Events ==
- Rambertino Buvalelli becomes podestà of the Republic of Genoa and probably introduces Occitan literature (including troubadour poetry) there
- Raimon Escrivan composes Senhors, l'autrier vi ses falhida during the Siege of Toulouse
- Enzio of Sardinia (died 1272), knight and general who wrote poems after being captured and imprisoned

== Births ==
- Enzio of Sardinia (died 1272), knight and general who wrote poems after being captured and imprisoned.

== Deaths ==
- June – William I of Baux (born 1155), French nobleman and troubadour, dies in a prison in Avignon
