= 1160s in poetry =

This article covers 1160s in poetry. Nationality words link to articles with information on the nation's poetry or literature (for instance, Irish or France).

== Works published ==
c. 1163:

- Nizami Ganjavi, Makhzan-ol-Asrâr (Persian: مخزن‌الاسرار, 'The Treasury or Storehouse of Mysteries'), Classical Persian poetry, first in the 5-volume Khamsa

== Births ==
Death years link to the corresponding "[year] in poetry" article. There are conflicting or unreliable sources for the birth years of many people born in this period; where sources conflict, the poet is listed again and the conflict is noted:

1160:

- Gace Brulé (died 1213) (approx.), French trouvère
- Alamanda de Castelnau (died 1223), trobairitz
- Hélinand of Froidmont (died 1237), medieval poet, chronicler, and ecclesiastical writer in Latin

1162:

- Fujiwara no Teika 藤原定家, also known as "Fujiwara no Sadaie" or "Sada-ie" (died 1241), a widely venerated, Japanese waka poet and (for centuries) extremely influential critic; also a scribe, scholar and extremely influential anthologist of the late Heian period and early Kamakura period; the Tale of Matsura is generally attributed to him; son of Fujiwara no Shunzei

1165:

- Jean Bodel (died 1210), Old French poet
- Blacatz (died 1237), Occitan troubadour
- Henry VI, Holy Roman Emperor (died 1197), King of Germany, patron of poets, poet

1166:

- Judah Messer Leon (died 1224), French Jewish poet and Rabbi, writing in Hebrew and Aramaic

== Deaths ==
Birth years link to the corresponding "[year] in poetry" article:

1160:

- Hassan Ghaznavi (born unknown), Persian poet
- Akka Mahadevi (born 1130), female Indian Kannada language Vachana sahitya didactic poet
- Ibn Quzman (born 1078), Spanish writer of classical poetry, especially zéjeles, in al-Andalus

1164:

- Abraham ibn Ezra (born 1089), Hebrew scholar and poet in al-Andalus

1166:

- Khoja Akhmet Yassawi (born 1093), Turkish mystic and poet

1167:

- Basava (died 1167), Indian Kannada language Vachana sahitya poet

== See also ==
- Poetry
- 12th century in poetry
- 12th century in literature
- List of years in poetry

Other events:

- Other events of the 12th century
- Other events of the 13th century

12th century:

- 12th century in poetry
- 12th century in literature
