= Palla (minstrel) =

Palla was a minstrel from Santiago de Compostela, active at the court of Alfonso VII of León in the mid-twelfth century. He may have been a performer of the early Galician-Portuguese lyric.

Palla is described in contemporary documentation as a iuglar (cognate with "juggler", but signifying jongleur). He was at Alfonso's court at Burgos on 24 April 1136 and again at Toledo on 9 December 1151.

== Sources ==
- Barton, Simon. The Aristocracy in Twelfth-Century León and Castile. Cambridge: Cambridge University Press, 1997. ISBN 0-521-49727-2.
