= 1215 in poetry =

== Events ==
- Gui de Cavalhon and Raymond VI of Toulouse composed a tenso while on their way to the Fourth Lateran Council

== Births ==
- Guido delle Colonne (died c. 1290) Sicilian writer, in Latin
- Meir of Rothenburg (died 1293), German rabbi and poet, a major author of the tosafot on Rashi's commentary on the Talmud

== Deaths ==
- Giraut de Bornelh (born 1138), French troubadour whose his skill earned him the nickname of "Master of the Troubadours"

== See also ==
- Poetry
- List of years in poetry
