= 1201 in poetry =

== Events ==
- Japanese former Emperor Go-Toba orders the preparation of Shin Kokin Wakashū (also spelled "Shinkokinshu") the eighth Japanese imperial waka poetry anthology. Its name apparently aimed to show the relation and counterpart to Kokin Wakashū, ordered in by former Emperor Go-Toba, compiled by Fujiwara no Teika (whose first name is sometimes romanized as Sadaie), Fujiwara Ariie, Fujiwara Ietaka (Karyū), the priest Jakuren, Minamoto Michitomo, and Asukai Masatsune (completed in 1205)

== Births ==
- Richard de Fournival (died 1260), a Trouvère
- Theobald I of Navarre (died 1253), Count of Champagne, a Trouvère

== Deaths ==
- Shikishi Naishinnō (born unknown), Japanese poet
