= 1239 in poetry =

== Births ==
- Peter III of Aragon (died 1285), an Occitan troubadour and King of Aragon

== Deaths ==
- March 28 – Emperor Go-Toba (born 1180), Japanese Emperor, calligrapher, painter, musician, poet, critic, and editor
