= Mu'izzi =

Persian Muslim anti-Christian poet

- معزی
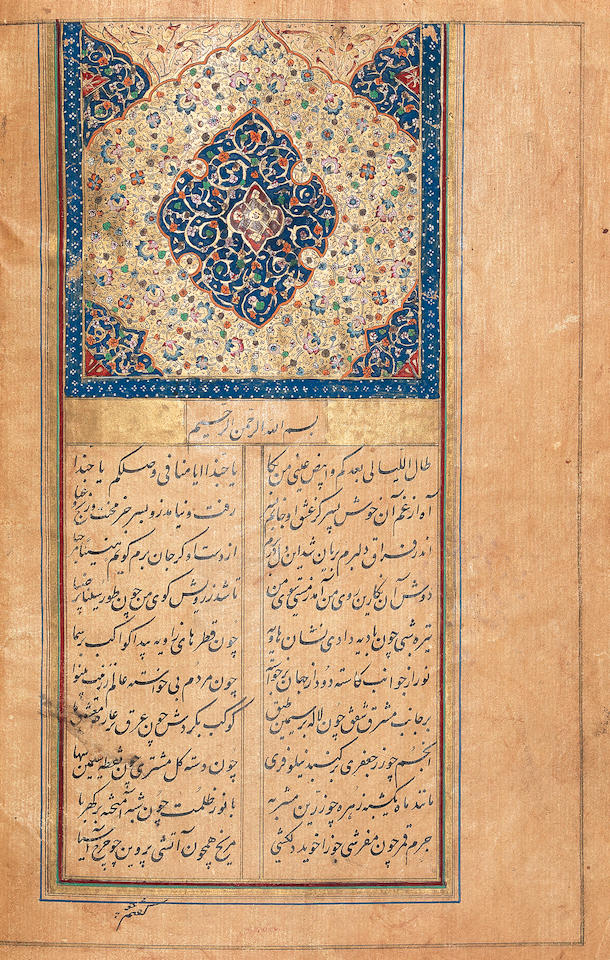
- Manuscript of Amir Mu'izzi's divan. Copy created in 19th-century Qajar Iran
- Born: 1048/9; Nishapur, Seljuk Empire
- Died: 1125/7
- Occupation: Poet
- Relatives: Abd al-Malik Burhani (father)

Amīr ash-Shu‘arā’ Abū Abdullāh Muḥammad b. ‘Abd al-Malik Mu‘izzī (Persian: امیرمعزی, romanized as Mu'ezzi) (born Nishapur 1048/9) was a poet who ranks as one of the great masters of the Persian panegyric form known as qasideh.

Mu'izzī's father, Abd al-Malik Burhani, was poet laureate of Sanjar under Malik Shāh I and Sultān Sanjar. His son followed, self-consciously, in his footsteps, styling himself as his father's deputy (nāyib) and inheriting his role. He was renowned both in his own time and to later scholarship.

His surviving divan extends to 18,000 distichs. Anvari accuses Mu'izzi of copying the verses of other poets (which cannot be proven for certain), yet Anvari himself is known to have copied Mu'izzi's verses. Mu'izzi is said to have died by the arrow shot at him by the King's son in 1125 CE for reasons unknown. He was accidentally shot by Sanjar.

== Life ==
Mu'izzi was of Persian origin. He was born to Abd al-Malik Burhani, the renowned poet laureate (Amir al-Shoara) who sojourned at the courts of the Seljuk rulers Alp Arslan and Malik-Shah I.

== Work ==
Some of his poems were dedicated to his father's patrons. Not much is known of his father's work. Burhani died in Qazvin during the early years of Malik-Shah I's reign. Mu'izzi's claim to have succeeded his father as 'the nightingale's child', seemingly justified by a famous verse cited by Nizami Aruzi and Aufi, has been cast into doubt as lacunae and possible attribution of the line to another writer. Burhani's divan seems to have been lost early in history, and few references survive from anthologies or later works. Raduyani quotes Burhani once in Tarjuman ul-Balagha, but other than this, his name is absent from known works produced in later centuries, such as Rashid al-Din Vatvat's Hada'iq al-sihr and Shams-i Qays's al-Mujam. Both later works contain references to Mu'izzi, but none of his father. Mu'izzi himself quotes his father's work once, in a qasida for the deputy of Nizam al-Mulk.

== Comparison with Farrukhi Sistani ==
Mu'izzi was an admirer of Unsuri and Farrukhi Sistani. His poems were composed in the panegyric tradition they established, which was later to be imitated by Sanai and others.

== Sources ==
- Tetley, Gillies (2008). The Ghaznavid and Seljuk Turks: Poetry as a Source for Iranian History. Routledge. ISBN 9781134084388.

== See also ==
- List of Persian poets and authors
- Persian literature
