= Azraqi =

Abul-Mahāsin Abu Bakr Zaynuddin Azraqi (Persian: ابوالمحاسن ابو بكر زين الدين ازرقی) was an 11th-century poet who lived in Herat.

Ferdowsi is said to have taken refuge in Azraqi's father's house (Ismail Varrāq, 'the book seller') on his flight from Ghazneh to Tus.

Born in Herat, Azraqi was an eminent panegyrist. He turned Alfiyya va Shalfiyya into poetry, and is said to have presented himself to Shamsudowleh Abolfavāris Tughan-Shah, son of Alp Arslan. He also wrote a version of the Sandbad nama. Except for his qasidahs, none of the aforementioned works remain.

He died in 1072 CE.

== See also ==
- List of Persian-language poets and authors
- Persian literature
