= Adib Sabir =

12th century Persian poet

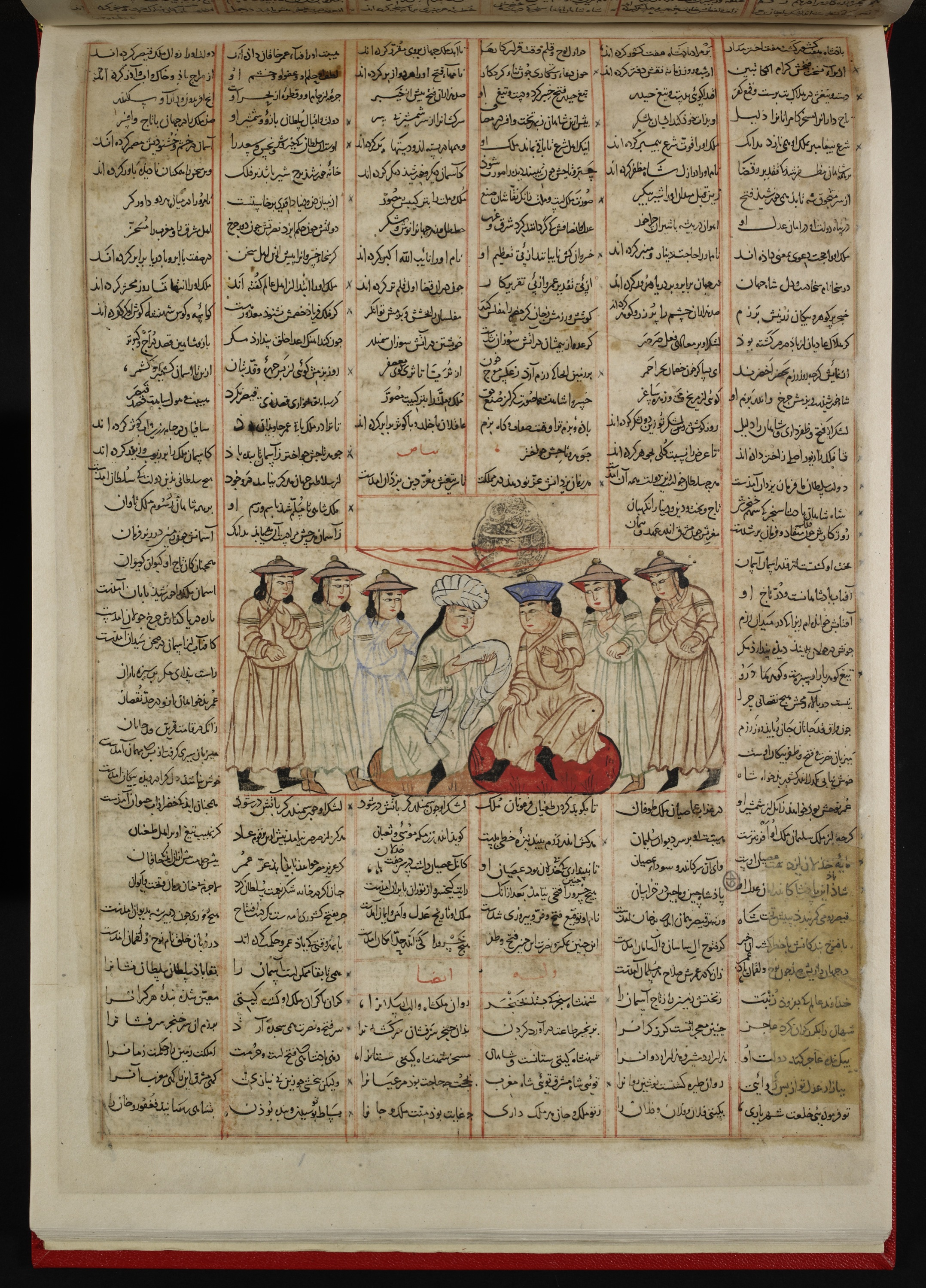
Adib Sabir receiving a robe of honour from Ahmad Sanjar. Copied by ʻAbd al-Muʼmin al-ʻAlavi al-Kashi between February 1314–February 1315

Shihabuddin Sharaful-udaba Sabir (Persian: شهاب‌الدین شرف‌الادبا صابر) known as Adib Sabir (ادیب صابر), was a 12th-century Persian poet. Originating from Termedh, he was employed in the court of Sultan Sanjar.

He is said to have also been used by the Sultan as a spy against the Sultan's enemies, who eventually drowned him in the Oxus in 1143 AD.

His Persian poetry writings are fluent and refined in style.

== See also ==
- List of Persian poets and authors
- Persian literature
- Persian poetry

== Sources ==
- Jan Rypka, History of Iranian Literature. Reidel Publishing Company. ASIN B-000-6BXVT-K
