= Am'aq =

12th century Persian poet

Shihabuddin Am'aq (Persian: شهاب‌الدین عَمعَق) was a 12th-century Persian poet.

Originating from Bukhara, he was an imposing poet that carried the title amir al-shu'ara ("Amir of poets") in the Khaqanid courts. An excellent panegyrist and composer of elegies, he was praised by Anvari.

His mathnavi no longer exists, but it is said to have been written on the story of Yusof and Zoleikha (Joseph and Potiphar's wife).

It is said that he lived a long life of over 100 years and died in 1148 CE.

== See also ==
- List of Persian poets and authors
- Persian literature
