= Yang Wanli =

Chinese poet and politician (1127–1206)

- Traditional Chinese: 楊萬里
- Simplified Chinese: 杨万里
Transcriptions
Standard Mandarin
- Hanyu Pinyin: Yáng Wànlǐ

Yang Wanli (or Yang Wan-Li) (Chinese: 楊萬里) (29 October 1127 – 1206), courtesy name Yanxiu (延秀), was a Chinese poet and politician, born in Jishui, Jizhou (today Jishui County, Jiangxi). He was one of the "four masters" of the Southern Song dynasty poetry.

Written during the final exile of the Song to Hangzhou, the poems celebrate the beauties and mysteries of nature, flora and fauna, much as the famed Song painters did. But they also querulously and wittily illuminate the annoyances and pleasures of everyday life.

He passed his jinshi exams in 1154 (24th year of the Shaoxing era) and served a number of minor official posts in the Song Dynasty.

== See also ==
- Huang Tingjian

== Sources ==
- Wanli, Yang (1975), Heaven My Blanket, Earth My Pillow: Poems from Sung Dynasty China by Yang Wan-Li (White Pine Press ed.), Weatherhill second, ISBN 1-893996-29-8
- Pine, Red (2003), Poems of the Masters: China's Classic Anthology of T'ang and Sung Dynasty Verse, Copper Canyon Press, ISBN 1-55659-195-0
- Wanli, Yang (1988), le son de la pluie - bilingual chinese - french, Moundarren, ISBN 2-907312-00-6
- Yang Wanli
