= 1214 in poetry =

== Births ==
- Sturla Þórðarson (died 1284), Icelandic politician/chieftain and writer; author of Íslendinga saga

== See also ==
- Poetry
- List of years in poetry
