= 1206 in poetry =

== Works ==
- Shin Kokin Wakashū, a Japanese imperial poetry anthology (approx.)

== Deaths ==
- Yang Wanli (born 1127), Chinese Song dynasty poet
