= 1211 in poetry =

== Events ==
- Giraut de Calanso wrote Bels senher Deus, quo pot esser sofritz, a planh for Ferdinand, infante of Castile

== Births ==
- Busiri (died 1294), Egyptian poet
