= Mei Yaochen =

Chinese poet

- 梅堯臣
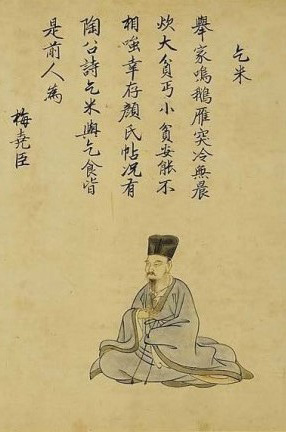
- Mei Yaochen, painted by Kanō Tsunenobu in the 18th century.
- Born: May 31, 1002; Xuancheng, Anhui, China
- Died: May 27, 1060 (aged 57); Kaifeng, Henan, China
- Occupation: Poet
- Children: Mei Zeng; Mei Chi; Mei Tong; Mei Gui'er
- Parent: Mei Rang
- Relatives: Mei Miao; Mei Yuan

Chinese name
- Traditional Chinese: 梅堯臣
- Simplified Chinese: 梅尧臣
Transcriptions
Standard Mandarin
- Hanyu Pinyin: Méi Yáochén
- Wade–Giles: Mei Yao-ch'en

Shengyu
- Traditional Chinese: 聖俞
- Simplified Chinese: 圣俞
Transcriptions
Standard Mandarin
- Hanyu Pinyin: Shèngyú

Wanling Xiansheng
- Chinese: 宛陵先生
Transcriptions
Standard Mandarin
- Hanyu Pinyin: Wǎnlíng Xiānshēng

Mei Yaochen (traditional Chinese: 梅堯臣; simplified Chinese: 梅尧臣; pinyin: Méi Yáochén; Wade–Giles: Mei Yao-ch'en; May 31, 1002 – May 27, 1060) was a Chinese poet of the Song dynasty. He was one of the pioneers of the "new subjective" style of poetry which characterized Song poetry.

Mei Yaochen was born in Xuancheng in present-day Anhui Province. His style name was 'Sheng Yu' (圣俞). He passed the jinshi exam in 1051 and had a career in the civil service, but was unsuccessful. He was a prolific poet, with around 3000 works extant; he was popularized as a poet by the younger Ouyang Xiu.

Most of his works are in the shi form, but they are much freer in content than those of the Tang dynasty. His response to the impossibility of surpassing the Tang poets was to make a virtue of his lack of ambition; his ideal was 平淡 (pingdan), or the pedestrian. His early verses are often socio-critical, advocating reform along Neo-Confucian lines; later he turned to celebrations of ordinary life and verses mourning the deaths of his first wife and several of his children. An example is his poem translated into English by Kenneth Rexroth as "An Excuse for Not Returning the Visit of a Friend."

== See also ==
- Chinese poetry
- Song poetry
- Classical Chinese poetry
- Chinese literature
- Culture of the Song Dynasty
