= Bersi Skáldtorfuson =

Icelandic skald

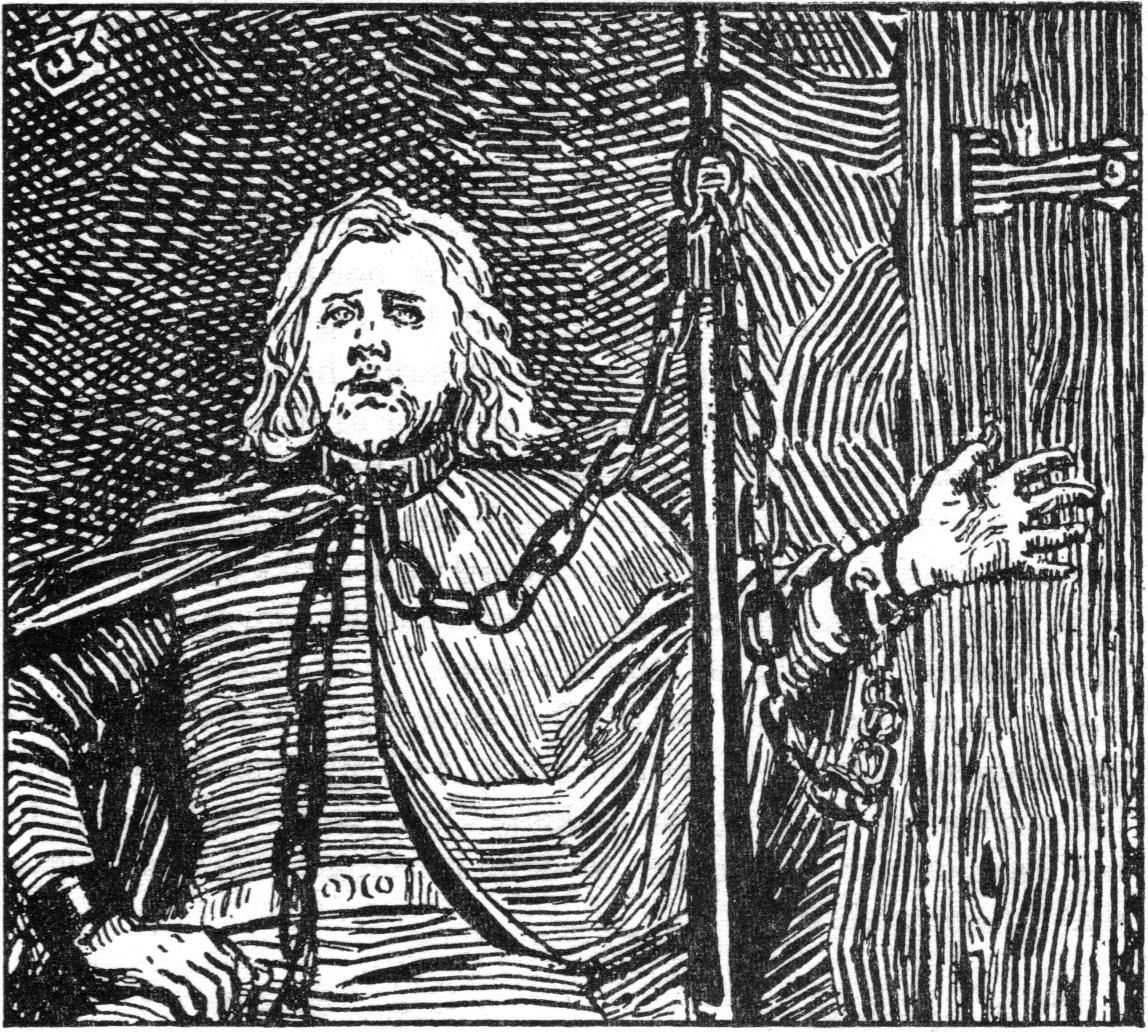
Bersi in chains after being captured by King Óláfr Haraldsson

Bersi Skáldtorfuson was an Icelandic skald, active around the year 1000. He was a court poet to Earl Sveinn Hákonarson. During the Battle of Nesjar he was captured by King Óláfr Haraldsson's forces. Three of the four stanzas of his that have survived were ostensibly composed while in captivity.

One lausavísa is attributed to Bersi in the surviving fragments of Óláfs saga helga by Styrmir Kárason. However, the same stanza is attributed to Sigvatr Þórðarson in Heimskringla and to Óttarr svarti in other sagas on St. Óláfr. Styrmir's saga gives some information on Bersi's career in St. Óláfr's service and indicates that he died in 1030.

Bersi was at some point at the court of King Canute the Great where Sigvatr Þórðarson addressed him in verse after they had both received gifts from the king. Apart from being mentioned in the kings' sagas, Bersi also has a minor role in Grettis saga, chapters 15, 23 and 24, where he asks Earl Sveinn to spare Grettir Ásmundarson's life.

Bersi's mother, Skáld-Torfa, was apparently also a poet but none of her works have survived.

== Poetry ==
Bersi Skáldtorfuson: "Flokkr um Óláf" 1-3:

Hróðrs batt heilan líða hagkennanda þenna, en snarrœki slíku svarat unnum vér gunnar; orð seldum þau elda úthauðrs boða, trauðir, knarrar, hapts, sem keyptak, kynstórs, at við brynju. Sveins raunir hefk sénar (snart rekninga bjartar) þars (svaltungur sungu) saman fórum vér, stórar; elds, munk eigi fylgja út, hríðboði, síðan, hests, at hverjum kosti, hranna, dýrra manni. Krýpk eigi svá, sveigir sára linns - í ári búum ólítinn Áta öndur þér til handa -, at herstefnir hafnak heiðmildr eða þá leiðumk, ungr kunnak, þar, þrøngvi þínn, hollvini mína. Finnur Jónsson's edition	Thou badest this eager Worshipper of poetry farewell, And we could answer The same, O strife-wont warrior! It listed me not to be delayed Longer; therefore I sold To the noble-born giver of gold Those words as I bought them. I have seen the great fights Of Swein; we fared together Once when the cool blades Afterwards sang loudly; Never again hereafter Shall I follow in a host, O king, any chieftain More glorious than he. This year I lie in chains For a long while in the great ship. O swinger of the sword! I humble Myself never so lowly, That I betray, O wise war king, My loyal friends or be loath To have them. In my youth Among my friends I found thy foe. Translation by Monsen and Smith	"Depart in peace," thou didst, prince, bid me, the poet; and I said the same to seasoned tree-of-combat. Unwillingly these words in weapon-thing returned I as from the Fáfnir's-treasure's- foe I had received them. Seen have I Svein tested since we fared together— sang loud polished swords—in serious conflicts, ruler. Never on shipboard shall I, should whate'er betide me, in fiercest fray tested follow a better master. Crouch I shall not, King, nor crawl before thee—rather, let us ready, liege, a large ship, this year—and so turn my back on true and tried friends and aggrieve them. Young when I was I held dear him who was your enemy. Hollander's translation

== See also ==
- List of Icelandic writers
- List of skalds
- Icelandic literature
