= Fujiwara no Ietaka =

Japanese poet (1158–1237)

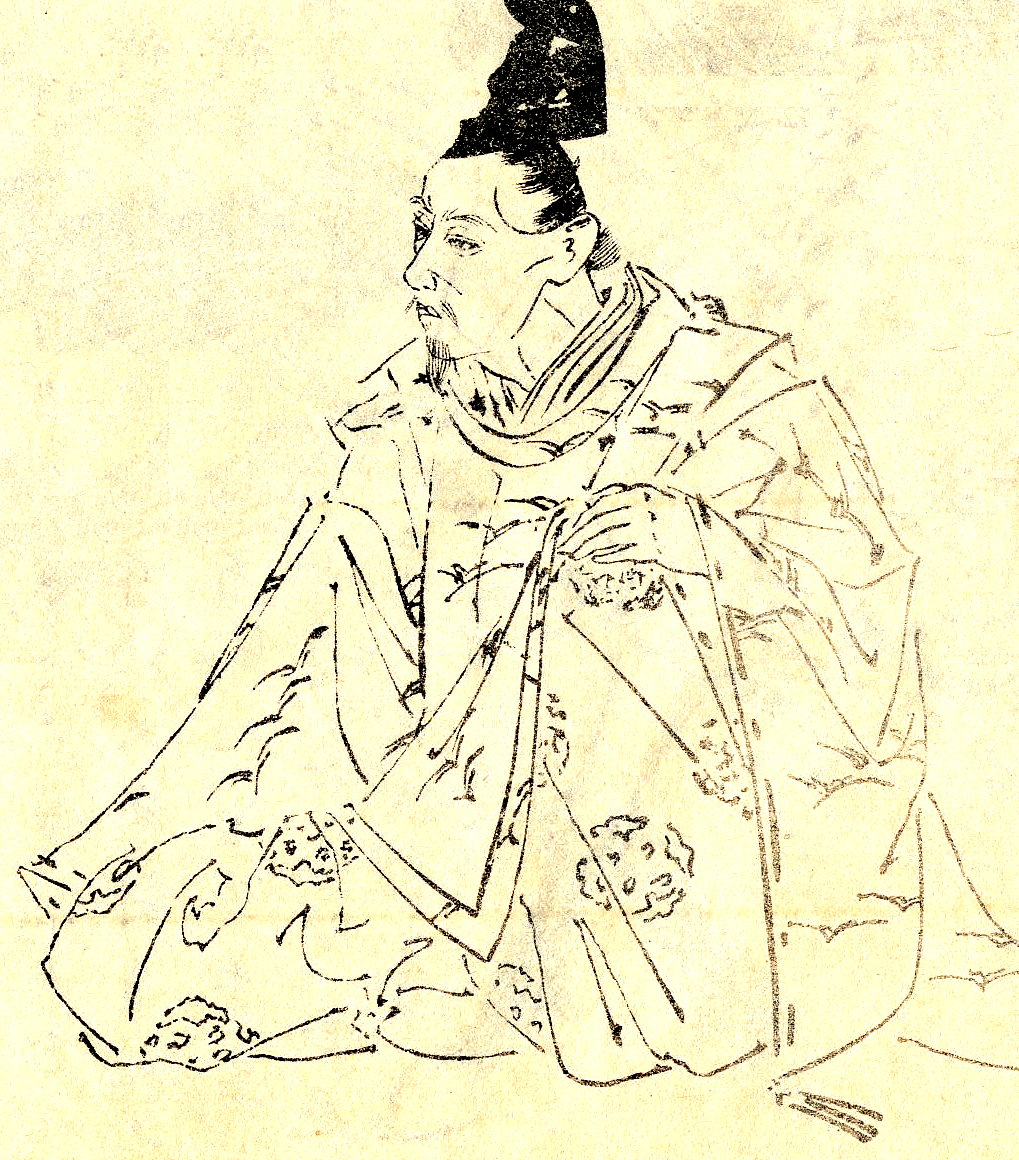
Fujiwara no Ietaka, drawn by Kikuchi Yōsai.

Fujiwara no Ietaka (藤原家隆; 1158 – May 5, 1237) was an early Kamakura period Japanese waka poet. Several of his poems are included in the Shin Kokin Wakashū. He was related by marriage to Jakuren, which made him strongly connected to the network of poets of the time. He was a pupil to Fujiwara no Shunzei.

== Poetry ==
Ietaka was involved in a number of poetic matches. One of these poems is from the Six Hundredth Poetry Competition (六百番歌合, Roppyaku-ban Uta Awase):

思ひ出でよ誰がかねごとの末ならむ
昨日の雲のあとの山風
omoiideyo ta ga kanegoto no sue naran kinō no kumo no ato no yamakaze
Remember well! Whose promises of love were they that brought this end? Fair clouds from yesterday blown away by the cold mountain's breath.
(Shin Kokin Wakashū 14:1294)

Ietaka also has a personal collection called the Collection of Jeweled Songs (玉吟集, Gyokuginshū).
