= 1217 in poetry =

== Deaths ==
- Ibn Jubayr (born 1145), geographer, traveler and poet from al-Andalus
- Gyōi (born 1177), Japanese poet and Buddhist monk

== See also ==
- Poetry
- List of years in poetry
