= Shin Kokin Wakashū =

8th anthology of Japanese waka poetry (compiled 1201)

The Shin Kokin Wakashū (新古今和歌集; "New Collection of Poems Ancient and Modern"), also known in abbreviated form as the Shin Kokinshū (新古今集) or even conversationally as the Shin Kokin, is the eighth imperial anthology of waka poetry compiled by the Japanese court, beginning with the Kokin Wakashū circa 905 and ending with the Shinshokukokin Wakashū circa 1439. The name can be literally translated as "New Collection of Ancient and Modern Poems" and bears an intentional resemblance to that of the first anthology. Together with the Man'yōshū and the Kokinshū, the Shin Kokinshū is widely considered to be one of the three most influential poetic anthologies in Japanese literary history. It was commissioned in 1201 by the retired emperor Go-Toba (r. 1183–1198), who established a new Bureau of Poetry at his Nijō palace with eleven Fellows, headed by Fujiwara no Yoshitsune, for the purpose of conducting poetry contests and compiling the anthology. Despite its emphasis on contemporary poets, the Shin Kokinshū covered a broader range of poetic ages than the Kokinshū, including ancient poems that the editors of the first anthology had deliberately excluded. It was officially presented in 1205, on the 300th anniversary of the completion of the Kokinshū.

== Editors of the anthology ==
Although Go-Toba retained veto power over the poems included in the anthology as well as the order in which they were presented, he assigned the task of compilation to six of the Fellows of the Bureau of Poetry. These were Fujiwara no Teika (1162–1241), Fujiwara no Ariie (1155–1216), Fujiwara no Ietaka (1158–1237), Jakuren (c. 1139–1202), Minamoto no Michitomo (1171–1237) and Asukai Masatsune (1170–1221). The anthology was also given a preface in Japanese prose by Fujiwara no Yoshitsune and a preface in Chinese—the scholarly language of the Court—by Fujiwara no Chikatsune, in a manner reminiscent of the Kokinshū.

== Significance ==
The significance of the Shin Kokinshū lies prominently in the technical expertise of the compilers, their novel and extensive use of the honkadori literary technique, and the effect that each of these elements had on Japanese poetry after its publication. Even though the Kokinshū is famous in part for its organization throughout the anthology, as each poem is generally given as a lead-in to the next, the Shin Kokinshū goes above and beyond the standard created by the original collection. The Kokinshū editors used linking poems as a general guide, but the Shin Kokinshū editors created "an anthology that may be read from beginning to end as a single long structure divided into books". For example, in the sections on the topic of Spring, the editors pieced together a detailed representation in poetic form of the advancement of spring and the passage of time, using similar words and expressions to link each poem to the next. In the section on travel poems, the progression is from ancient poets and styles to modern ones, and as is common in Japanese waka anthologies, the sections on Love are arranged to show the stages of an affair from first love to bitter parting.

This kind of detailed manipulation resulted in an anthology that did not necessarily contain all of the best works of the day. As Fujiwara no Teika complained, Go-Toba's insistence on including the works of old, obscure or even unaccomplished composers in the anthology in order to maintain appropriate links to those poems that were worthwhile made the honor of having forty-six of his own poems included in the anthology less satisfactory. Individual egos aside, the result was a composition that not only spanned centuries of Japanese literary tradition and evolving literary styles but also provided a veritable textbook on what well and poorly written poems looked like. The elaborate linking format developed by the editors was also picked up and carried forward with the development of the renga or "linked verse" form, in which poets wrote a series of verses together in turns by continuing the image of the previous verse and introducing something new for the next poet to work with. Renga also made frequent use of the honkadori technique, since each poet had only a short phrase to work with and the ability to use allusions to prior, complete poems was an important one.

The term "Honkadori" refers to the practice of "allusive variation," and can be literally translated as "taking from an original poem". Even though allusions to older poems were common in the poetic discourse of the day, following the 11th century and prior to Fujiwara no Teika's experimentation with honkadori, it was frowned upon to make obvious borrowings from past writers. However, that changed significantly with the publication of the Shin Kokinshū. Instead of mimicking only the horizontal flow of the Kokinshū, the poems in the New Collection also make vertical links to the poetic traditions of the past, and by borrowing from specific poems and not simply from stock phrases, the authors and editors of the poems in the Shin Kokinshū were able to step away from overused and more clearly unoriginal topics that ancient poems had popularized. The following example compares one of Teika's own poems in the Shin Kokinshū to its honka, or original poem, in the Kokinshū.

Samushiro ya
matsu yo no aki no
kaze fukete
tsuki wo katashiku
uji no hashihime

Translation:

How cold!
waiting out the autumn’s weary night
deepening as the wind blows
she spreads out the moon’s light
the Princess of Uji Bridge.

—Teika SKKS 4:420

Samushiro ni
koromo katashiki
koyoi mo ya
ware wo matsuramu
uji no hashihime

Translation:

On the cold mat
spreading out her gown,
this night too
will she wait for me—
the Princess of Uji Bridge?

—KKS 14:684

Although the poems are written on the same subject, with the newer one drawing directly from the older, Fujiwara no Teika's interpretation both modernizes the poem and provides it with greater subtlety. It also accomplishes a connection between the Kokinshū and the Shin Kokinshū.

== Structure ==
The structure of the Shin Kokinshū echoes that of the Kokinshū in many ways, but it also shows the influence of the intervening imperial anthologies. As can be seen in the table below, the Shin Kokinshū omits certain books from the original anthology, and includes others on poetic topics that gained prominence only after the publication of the Kokinshū.

Topic	Kokinshū		Shin Kokinshū	
Seasons	1-2	Spring	1-2	Spring
Seasons	3	Summer	3	Summer
Seasons	4-5	Autumn	4-5	Autumn
Seasons	6	Winter	6	Winter
	7	Congratulations	7	Congratulations
	8	Partings	8	Laments
	9	Travel	9	Partings
	10	Acrostics	10	Travel
Love	11-15	Love	11-15	Love
Miscellany	16	Laments	16–18	Miscellaneous
Miscellany	17-18	Miscellaneous	16–18	Miscellaneous
Miscellany	19	Miscellaneous Forms	19	Shinto Poems
Miscellany	20	Traditional Poems from the Bureau of Song	20	Buddhist Poems

The 20 books of the Shin Kokinshū contain nearly 2,000 waka, with the number varying depending on the edition, as Go-Toba continued to edit the anthology extensively even after his exile to the island of Oki. Each poem is introduced with information regarding the occasion for which it was composed (if that information was available) and in most cases an author is also listed. Major contemporary poetic contributors to the Shin Kokinshū include Saigyō with 94 poems; Jien with 92; Fujiwara no Yoshitsune with 79; Fujiwara no Shunzei with 72; Princess Shikishi with 49; Fujiwara no Teika with 46; Fujiwara no Ietaka with 43; Jakuren with 35; and Go-Toba with 33.

== See also ==
- 1205 in poetry
- List of Japanese poetry anthologies
- Japanese poetry
- 13th century in poetry
- Honkadori
