= 1202 in poetry =

== Events ==
- Nizami Ganjavi completes Eskandar Nameh, a romance of Alexander the Great
- Peter of Blois resigns as Dean of St Peter's Collegiate Church

== Deaths ==
- Hammad al-Harrani (born unknown), Muslim scholar, poet, merchant and traveler
- Alain de Lille (born 1128), French theologian and poet, writing in Latin
- Eugenius of Palermo (born 1130), amiratus (admiral), translator, and poet
- Gaucelm Faidit (born 1170), Occitan troubadour (approx.)
- Jakuren (born 1139), Japanese Buddhist priest and poet
