= Gyōi =

Gyōi (行意; c. 1177 - December 29, 1217) was a Japanese poet and Buddhist monk of the late Heian and early Kamakura periods.

He was the son of Fujiwara no Motofusa, and was known as the high priest of Yamashina (山科僧正, Yamashina Sōjō).

He was one of the New Thirty-Six Immortals of Poetry, and many of his poems appear in imperial poetry collections such as the Shinchokusen Wakashū, Shokushūi Wakashū, Shingosen Wakashū, and Shokusenzai Wakashū.
