= 1205 in poetry =

== Works ==
- Fujiwara no Teika (whose first name is sometimes romanized as Sadaie), Fujiwara Ariie, Fujiwara Ietaka (Karyū), the priest Jakuren, Minamoto Michitomo, and Asukai Masatsune, editors, Shin Kokin Wakashū (also spelled "Shinkokinshu") the eighth Japanese imperial waka poetry anthology, which had been ordered in 1201 by former Japanese Emperor Go-Toba. Its name apparently aimed to show the relation and counterpart to Kokin Wakashū, the first imperial poetry anthology.

== Births ==
- Tikkana (died 1288), second poet of “Trinity of Poets (Kavi Trayam)” that translated Mahabharatamu into Telugu over a period of few centuries

== Deaths ==
- Peire Vidal, (born 1175), Occitan troubadour
