= 1208 in poetry =

== Deaths ==
- Kolbeinn Tumason (born 1173), Icelandic, dies following the Battle of Víðines, allegedly composing Heyr himna smiður (Hear, Heavenly Creator) on his deathbed.
- Guiot de Provins died sometime after 1208 (born unknown), French poet and Trouvère
