= Anvari =

Persian poet

- اوحدالدین علی ابن محمد انوری
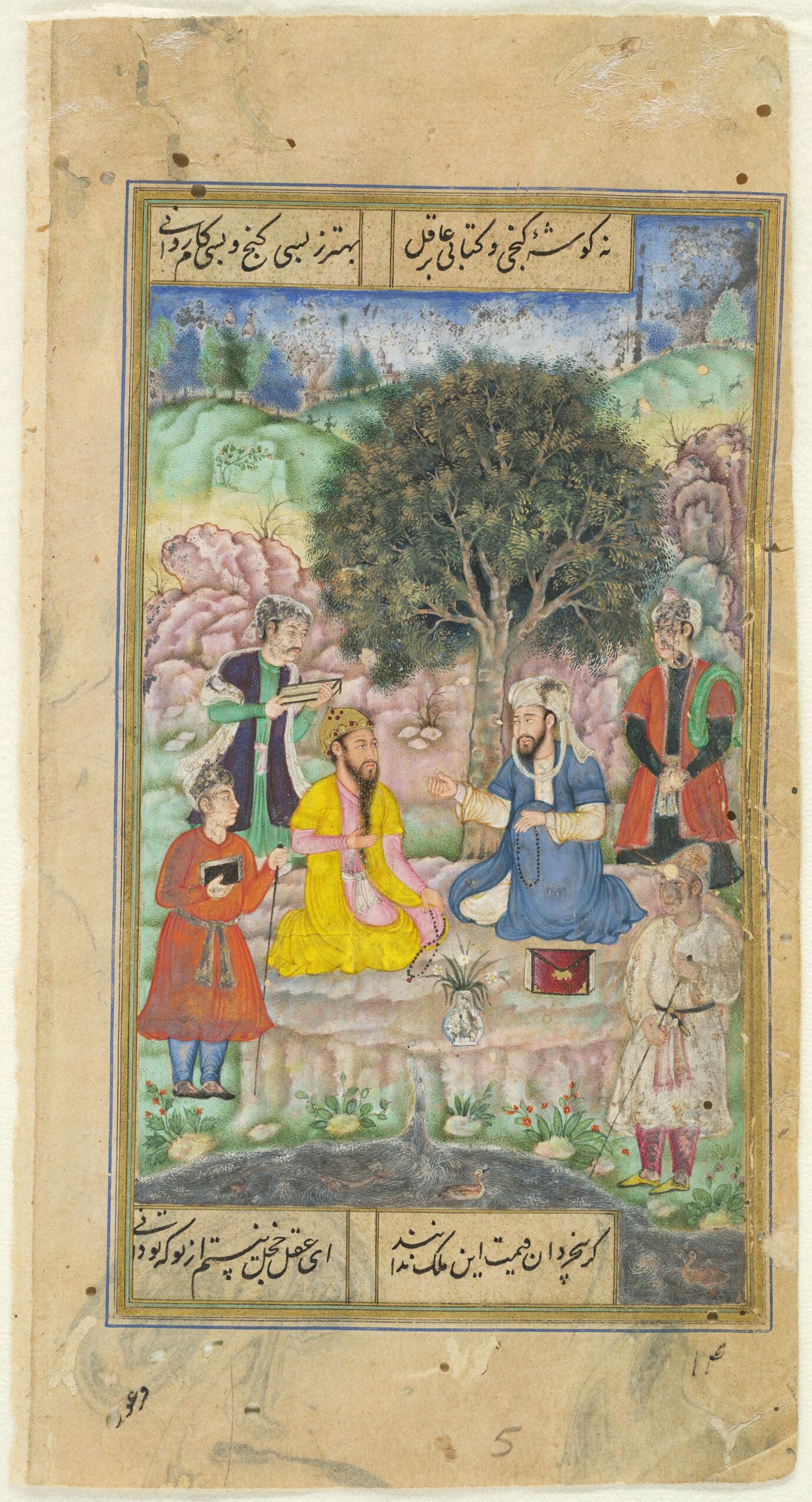
- A page from an illuminated manuscript of Anvari’s Divan, made in Lahore in 1588 for the Mughal emperor Akbar, now in the collection of the Harvard Art Museums.
- Born: 1126; Abiward, Khurasan, Seljuk Empire
- Died: 1189 (aged 63); Balkh, Khurasan, Kara-Khanid Khanate
- Occupation: Poet

Anvari (1126–1189), full name Awhad ad-Din 'Ali ibn Mohammad Khavarani or Awhad ad-Din 'Ali ibn Mahmud (Persian: اوحدالدین علی ابن محمد انوری) was a Persian poet.

Anvarī was born in Abivard (now in Turkmenistan) and died in Balkh, Khorāsān (now in Afghanistan). He studied science and literature at the collegiate institute in Toon (now Ferdows, Iran), becoming a famous astronomer as well as a poet.

Anvari's poems were collected in a Divan, and contains panegyrics, eulogies, satire, and others. His elegy "Tears of Khorasan", translated into English in 1789, is considered to be one of the most beautiful poems in Persian literature. The Cambridge History of Iran calls Anvari "one of the greatest figures in Persian literature". Despite their beauty, his poems often required much help with interpretation, as they were often complex and difficult to understand.

Anvari's panegyric in honour of the Seljuk sultan Sultan Sanjar (1117–1157), ruler of Khorasan, won him royal favour, and allowed him to go on to enjoy the patronage of two of Sanjar's successors. However, when his prophecy of disasters in October 1185 failed, he fell out of favour with the kingship, and was forced into a life of scholarly service, eventually taking his own life in 1189.

== Life ==
Anwari was born in the Khawaran district (Balkh) of Khorasan early in the 12th century. He enjoyed the special favour of the Sultan Sanjar, whom he attended in all his warlike expeditions. On one occasion, when the sultan was besieging the fortress of Hazarasp, a fierce poetical conflict was maintained between Anwari and his rival Rashidi, who was within the beleaguered castle, by means of verses fastened to arrows. His literary powers are considerable, as shown in his famous lament over the ruin caused by the Ghuzz tribesmen in Khurasan, and his exercises in irony and ridicule make pungent reading. He was adept in astrology and considered himself to be superior to his contemporaries in logic, music, theology, mathematics and all other intellectual pursuits.

It appears that his patrons after Sultan Sanjar failed to value his services as highly as he did himself; at any rate he considered their rewards inadequate. Either that fact or jealousy of his rivals caused him to renounce the writing of eulogies and of ghazals, although it is difficult to decide at what point in his career this took place. His satires doubtless created him enemies. His declining fortunes led to persistent complaint against capricious Fate. In style and language he is sometimes obscure, so that Dawlatshah declares that he needs a commentary. That obscurity, and a change in literary taste, may be one reason for his comparative neglect.

Anwari died at Balkh towards the end of the 12th century. The Diwan, or collection of his poems, consists of a series of long poems, and a number of simpler lyrics. His longest piece, The Tears of Khorassan, was translated into English verse by Captain Kirkpatrick.

== See also ==
- List of Persian poets and authors
- Persian literature

== Sources ==
- Beelaert, Anna Livia (2017). "Anvarī, Awḥad al-Dīn". In Fleet, Kate; Krämer, Gudrun; Matringe, Denis; Nawas, John; Rowson, Everett (eds.). Encyclopaedia of Islam (3rd ed.). Brill Online. ISSN 1873-9830.
- Daadbeh, Asghar (2015). "Anwarī". In Madelung, Wilferd; Daftary, Farhad (eds.). Encyclopaedia Islamica Online. Brill Online. ISSN 1875-9831.
- de Bruijn, J. T. P. (1986). "Anwari". In Yarshater, Ehsan (ed.). Encyclopædia Iranica. Vol. II/3: ʿArab Moḥammad–Architecture IV. London and New York: Routledge & Kegan Paul. pp. 141–143. ISBN 978-0-71009-103-1.
- Rypka, Jan (1968). History of Iranian Literature. Springer Netherlands. ISBN 978-9401034814.
