= 1209 in poetry =

== Events ==
- Guillem Augier Novella penned A People Grieving for the Death of their Lord, a planh on the death of Raymond Roger Trencavel.
- Gui d'Ussel, in obedience to a papal injunction from Pierre de Castelnau, ceased composing and writing.

== Births ==
- Shang Ting (died 1288), writer of Chinese Sanqu poetry

== Deaths ==
- Nizami Ganjavi (born 1141), Persian romantic epic poet
- Ruzbihan Baqli (born 1128), Persian poet, mystic, and Sufi
