= 1210 in poetry =

== Events ==
- Albertet de Sestaro moves into Lombardy, where he stays until 1221

== Births ==
- Óláfr Þórðarson (died 1259), Icelandic skald
- Philippe de Rémi (died 1265), Old French poet and trouvère

== Deaths ==
- Jean Bodel (born 1165), Old French poet
- Hartmann von Aue (born 1170), German poet of the Middle High German period
- Gottfried von Straßburg (born unknown), a German Minnesänger
- Lu You (born 1125), Chinese Song dynasty poet
