= Jakuren =

Japanese poet

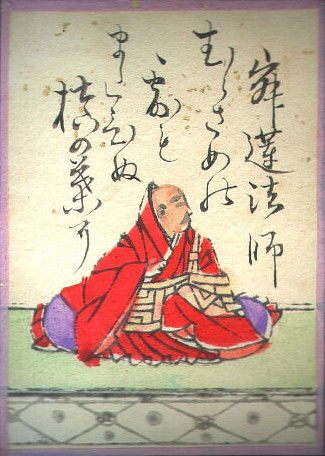
Jakuren in the Hyakunin Isshu.

Jakuren (寂蓮) (also known as Fujiwara no Sadanaga (藤原定長) before becoming a monk) (1139–1202) was a Japanese Buddhist priest and poet. He was adopted by the noted poet Fujiwara no Shunzei upon the death of Shunzei's younger brother. Shunzei originally intended for Sadanaga to be his heir; however, he subsequently had two male offspring of his own, and Sadanaga was forced to step aside in favor of Fujiwara no Sadaie. As was common practice at the time, he became a monk, and acquired the religious name of Jakuren. Taking Saigyo as his model, he traveled around the country, composing poems of his travels. He was well regarded in his time and frequently associated with Fujiwara no Teika. He was one of the six compilers of the eighth imperial waka anthology, the famous Shin Kokin Wakashū, and thirty-five of his poems were selected for the work. Before he died, he adopted Fujiwara no Ietaka, pupil to Shunzei. One of his poems was included in the famous poetry anthology Hyakunin Isshu.

His 117 poems were selected for "Senzai Wakashu" (Collection of Japanese Poetry of a Thousand Years) and other successive Chokusen Wakashu (anthology of Japanese poetry compiled by Imperial command). His personal collection on poetry is "Jakuren Hoshi shu."
