= 11th century in literature =

This article is a list of literary events and publications in the 11th century.

== Events ==
- c. 1000–1025 – The only surviving manuscript of Beowulf is written.
- 1007 – The Book of Kells is probably stolen from the Abbey of Kells in Ireland for several months.
- 1016 – The Icelandic skald Bersi Skáldtorfuson is captured at the naval Battle of Nesjar and imprisoned.
- c. 1022 – Nannayya, Aadi Kavi ("the first poet"), begins work on Andhra Mahabharatam, a translation of the Mahabharata into Telugu and the first work of Telugu literature.
- 1029 – Sultan Mahmud of Ghazni orders the library of Rey in Persia to be burned and all books to be deemed as heretical.
- 1070
  - The Temple of Literature, Hanoi, is founded in the Vietnamese capital.
  - King Bleddyn ap Cynfyn enacts new laws regulating the activities of Welsh bards and musicians.
- 1080–1086 – The Chinese poet and polymath Su Shi is sent into internal exile for political reasons. During this period he writes the first and second Chibifu (赤壁賦 "The Red Cliffs").
- 1086 – Poet-ruler of Al-Andalus, Al-Mu'tamid ibn Abbad, kills his fellow-poet, former lover and vizier Muhammad ibn Ammar.

== New works ==
- 1000
  - Al-Tasrif (كتاب التصريف لمن عجز عن التأليف The Method of Medicine), by Abu al-Qasim al-Zahrawi (Abulcasis)
  - The Remaining Signs of Past Centuries (کتاب الآثار الباقية عن القرون الخالية Kitāb al-āthār al-bāqiyah `an al-qurūn al-khāliyah), by Abū Rayḥān al-Bīrūnī
- c. 1000 – The Battle of Maldon (Old English)
- c. 1008–10 – The Diary of Lady Murasaki (紫式部日記 Murasaki Shikibu Nikki), by Murasaki Shikibu (in kana script)
- 1010: March 8 (completed) – Shahnameh by Ferdowsi
- 1011 – Manual (Enchiridion) by Byrhtferth of Ramsey Abbey
- 1012–18 – Chronicon Thietmari by Thietmar of Merseburg
- July 1017 – Epistle 6, earliest of the Epistles of Wisdom, by Hamza ibn Ali
- By 1018 – Confessio Theologica by John of Fécamp
- 1019 – Legenda Sancti Goeznovii by 'William'
- By 1021 – The Tale of Genji (源氏物語 Genji monogatari), by Murasaki Shikibu
- 1021 – Book of Optics by Alhazen
- 1026–46 – Historiarum libri quinque ab anno incarnationis DCCCC usque ad annum MXLIV (History in five books from AD 900–1044) by Rodulfus Glaber
- 1025 – The Canon of Medicine by Avicenna
- 1027 – The Book of Healing by Avicenna
- c. 1040–44 – Wujing Zongyao (武經總要, "Collection of the Most Important Military Techniques") by Zeng Gongliang, Ding Du, Yang Weide and others
- c. 1040–53 – Mukhtar al-hikam wa mahasin al-kalim (Choice Maxims and Finest Sayings) by al-Mubashshir ibn Fatiq
- 1041–42 – Encomium Emmae Reginae probably by a Flemish monk of the Abbey of Saint Bertin, Saint-Omer
- Mid-11th century – Sponsus
- After c. 1040 – Le Chanson de Roland (The Song of Roland), original version, perhaps by Turold
- c. 1049 – Chronicle of Nantes (Chronicon Namnetense) concludes
- c. 1054–76 – Cançó de Santa Fe by an anonymous clerk in a Catalan dialect of Old Occitan
- After 1056 – Liber precum variarum by John of Fécamp
- 1064 – Liniantu (歷年圖 "Chart of Successive Years") by Sima Guang
- 1066 – by Sima Guang
  - Leipian (類篇 Classified Chapters; Chinese dictionary)
  - Tongzhi (通志 Comprehensive Records (of Chinese history))
- 1070 – Kutadgu Bilig (The Wisdom Which Brings Good Fortune), by Yusuf Khass Hajib of Balasagun in the Kara-Khanid Khanate (Uyghur language)
- c. 1070
  - Hamamatsu Chūnagon Monogatari (浜松中納言物語), attributed to Takasue's Daughter
  - Kathāsaritsāgara by Somadeva
- 1073–76 – Gesta Hammaburgensis ecclesiae pontificum by Adam of Bremen
- c. 1075 – Vita sancta Servatii and Miracula sancta Servatii (Life and Miracles of Saint Servatius) by Jocundus
- 1077 – Monologion (Monologue) by Anselm
- 1077–78 – Proslogion (Address) by Anselm
- 1084 –Zizhi Tongjian (資治通鑑; Comprehensive Mirror to Aid in Government) by Sima Guang
- 1086 – Domesday Book
- c. 1087 – Almanac by Abū Ishāq Ibrāhīm al-Zarqālī (Arzachel)
- 1088 – Dream Pool Essays (夢溪筆談, Mèng Xī Bǐ Tán) by Shen Kuo
- 1098 – Elucidarium by Honorius Augustodunensis
- Late 11th century
  - The Incoherence of the Philosophers (تهافت الفلاسفة, Tahāfut al-Falāsifaʰ) by Al-Ghazali
  - Lebor Gabála Érenn
  - Siyasatnama (سياست نامه) by Nizam al-Mulk (Persian)
- 11th or 12th century – Betha Meic Creiche (Life of Mac Creiche, in Middle Irish)
- c. 11th century – The Records of Origin on Things and Affairs (事物纪原), by Gao Cheng
- Heian period
  - Sarashina Nikki (更級日記, a travel diary) by Takasue's Daughter
  - Yoru no Nezame (夜の寝覚, Wakefulness at Night), attributed to Takasue's Daughter, but perhaps written after 1086

== Births ==
- c. 1001 – Wallada bint al-Mustakfi, al-Andalusian poet and princess (died 1091)
- c. 1003 – Ibn Zaydún, Arab poet (died 1071)
- c. 1033 – Anselm of Canterbury, Aosta-born scholastic philosopher, archbishop and saint (died 1109)
- 1037: January 8 – Su Shi, Chinese poet (died 1101)
- 1040: February 22 – Rashi, French rabbinical scholar (died 1105)
- 1048: May 18 – Omar Khayyám, Persian philosopher, scientist and presumed poet (died 1131)
- 1078: Ibn Quzman, al-Andalusian poet (died 1160)
- 1079: Peter Abelard, French philosopher, theologian, and poet (died 1142)

== Deaths ==
- 1001 – Wang Yucheng, Chinese poet (born 954)
- c. 1002 – Hrotsvitha, Saxon secular canoness and writer of Latin poetry and drama (born c. 935)
- c. 1010 – Ælfric of Eynsham, abbot and religious writer in Old English (born c. 955)
- 1029 – Koshikibu no Naishi (小式部内侍), Japanese waka poet
- 1037 – Avicenna (Ibn-Sīnā), Persian polymath
- 1064: August 15 – Ibn Hazm (al-Andalusī aẓ-Ẓāhirī), Andalusian polymath (born 994)
- 1079: February 22 – John of Fécamp, Italian-born Benedictine abbot and spiritual writer

== In literature ==
- Paul Kingsnorth's novel The Wake (2014) is set around the Norman conquest of England.

== See also ==
- 11th century in poetry
- 10th century in literature
- 12th century in literature
- list of years in literature
