= 12th century in literature =

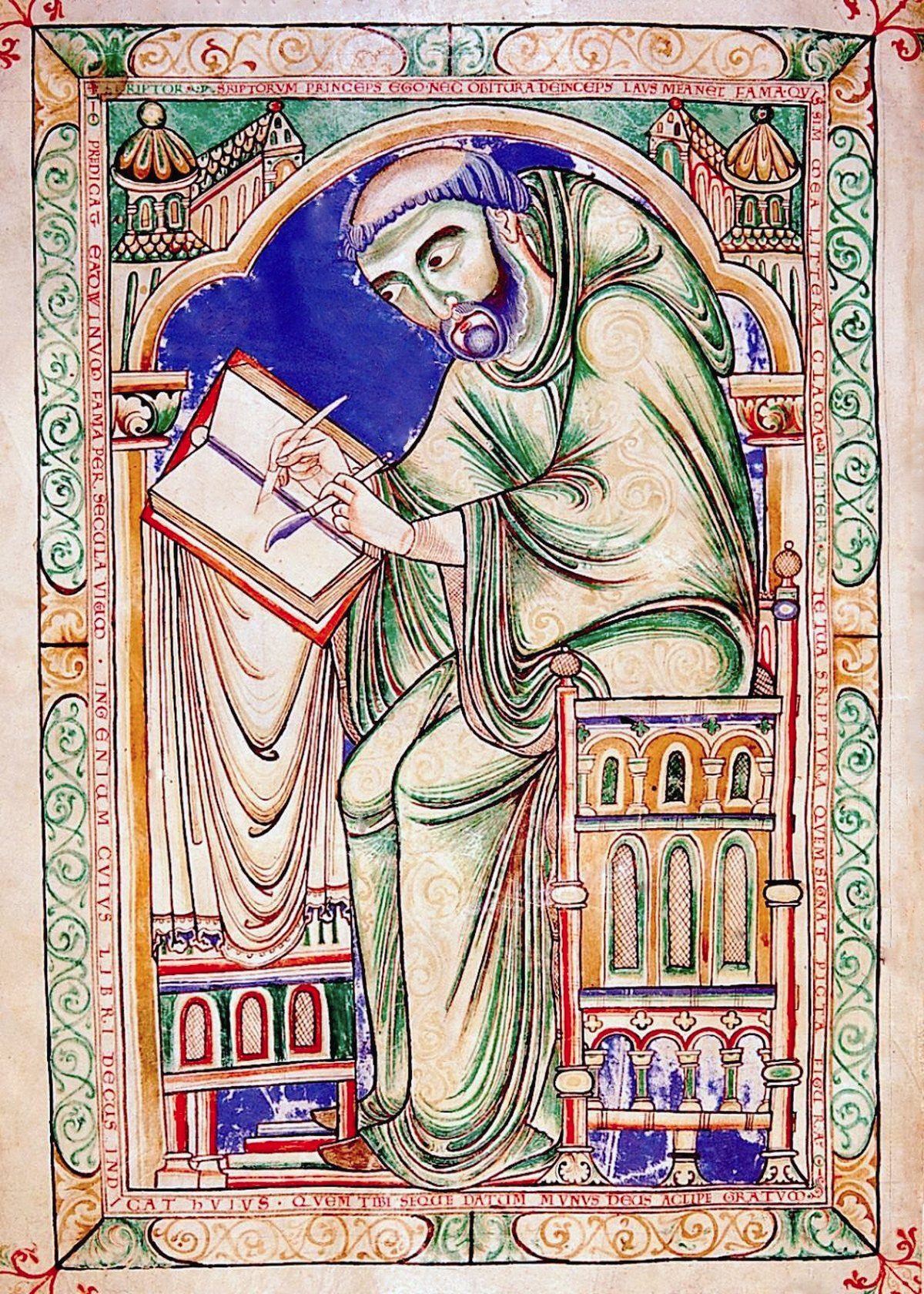
Scribe of Eadwine Psalter (mid-12th century, English)

This article is a list of literary events and works created in the 12th century.

The 12th century in Western Europe saw an increase in the production of Latin texts and a proliferation of literate clerics from the multiplying cathedral schools. At the same time, vernacular literatures ranging from Provençal to Icelandic embodied in lyric and romance the values and worldview of an increasingly self-conscious and prosperous courtly aristocracy. These two trends contributed to a sweeping revival of letters with a lasting influence on the development of literature in the following centuries.

== Events ==
- 1104: September 3 – St. Cuthbert is reburied in Durham Cathedral (England) and the St. Cuthbert Gospel of St. John removed from his tomb.
- 1170: Poet, politician and historian Lu You (陸游) travels on the Grand Canal (China) from Shaoxing to the river Yangtze, recording his progress in a diary.
- Before 1173: Copenhagen Psalter produced in northern England
- 1170: 29 December – Archbishop of Canterbury Thomas Becket is assassinated in Canterbury Cathedral, an event that inspires several plays, notably: Alfred, Lord Tennyson's Becket (1884), T. S. Eliot's Murder in the Cathedral (1935), Jean Anouilh's Becket (Becket, ou l'honneur de Dieu, 1959) and Paul Webb's Four Nights in Knaresborough (1999). It also features in novels such as Conrad Ferdinand Meyer's Der Heilige ("The Saint", 1879), Ken Follett's The Pillars of the Earth (1989) and Sharon Kay Penman's Time and Chance (2002).
- c. 1193: The university and its libraries at Nalanda in India are sacked and burned by Turkic invader Ikhtiyar Uddin Muhammad bin Bakhtiyar Khilji; the burning of the library is said to have continued for several months.

== Histories ==
- Early 12th century
  - Gesta Francorum
  - Íslendingabók
  - Liber Eliensis by monks of Ely Abbey
- By 1106 Lebor na hUidre by monks of Clonmacnoise
- 1108 Dei gesta per Francos by Guibert of Nogent
- c. 1112–18 Gesta principum Polonorum by 'Gallus Anonymus'
- c. 1113 Primary Chronicle (Church Slavonic: Повѣсть времяньныхъ лѣтъ, Povest' Vremyan'nykh Let', Tale of Bygone Years or Chronicle of Nestor)
- c. 1120–40 Annals of St Neots by monks of Bury St Edmunds
- 1122–54 Peterborough Chronicle
- c. 1125–50 Historia Hierosolymitanae expeditionis by Albert of Aix
- c. 1135–39 Estoire des Engleis by Geoffrey Gaimar
- c. 1136 Historia Regum Britanniae by Geoffrey of Monmouth
- From 1137 Vita Ludovici regis by Abbot Suger and Historia gloriosi regis Ludovici by Suger and others
- Concludes 1140 Chronicon ex chronicis by John of Worcester
- c. 1140 Chronicon Roskildense
- 1145 Samguk Sagi (삼국사기, History of the Three Kingdoms) by Kim Pusik and others
- Concludes 1146 Chronica de duabus civitatibus by Otto of Freising
- c. 1149–50 Visio Tnugdali transcribed by Brother Marcus
- c. 1150–55 Roman de Brut by Wace
- Concludes 1152 Gesta Friderici Imperatoris Book 1 by Otto of Freising
- 1153–54 Relatio de Standardo (Account of the Standard, or De bello standardii, On the Battle of the Standard) by Aelred of Rievaulx
- 1154 Historia Anglorum by Henry of Huntingdon (fifth and last book completed)
- c. 1162–84 Gesta comitum Barcinonensium by monks of Santa Maria de Ripoll
- c. 1170 Chronicon Lethrense
- 1170–84 Historia rerum in partibus transmarinis gestarum by William of Tyre
- c.1168–69 Chronica Slavorum by Helmold of Bosau
- By 1177 Unum ex quatuor (gospel harmony with commentary) by Clement of Llanthony
- c. 1178–1208 Gesta Danorum by Saxo Grammaticus
- c. 1181–82 Witherlogh by Sven Aggesen
- c. 1183 De bello Troiano by Joseph of Exeter
- c. 1186–87 Historia brevis regum Dacie by Sven Aggesen
- c. 1188 Topographia Hibernica ("Topography of Ireland") by Gerald of Wales
- 1190s Chronicle of the Priest of Duklja
- c. 1190–1215 Brut by Layamon
- c. 1191 (circulated, after revisions c. 1216-1217) De principis instructione (On the education of a prince) by Gerald of Wales
- 1192 Chronicon de rebus gestis Ricardi Primi by Richard of Devizes

== Philosophy/theology ==
- Early 12th century Rhinelandic Rhyming Bible
- c. 1120 Theologia 'Summi Boni' by Peter Abelard
- c. 1121 Sic et Non by Peter Abelard
- c. 1141–42 Historia Ecclesiastica by Orderic Vitalis
- c. 1142 Speculum caritatis (The Mirror of Charity) by Aelred of Rievaulx
- 1150 Skara Missal
- c. 1150
  - Hayy ibn Yaqdhan by Ibn Tufail
  - The Four Books of Sentences (Libri Quattuor Sententiarum) by Peter Lombard
  - De tribus in paenitentia consideranda and Unum ex quatuor by Clement of Llanthony
- Mid-12th century Unum ex quatuor by Clement of Llanthony (translation into Middle English: Oon of Foure)
- c. 1152–64 Liber viarum Dei by Elisabeth of Schönau
- c. 1160
  - De institutione inclusarum by Aelred of Rievaulx
  - Policraticus by John of Salisbury
- 1163? Makhzan al-Asrar (The Treasury of Mysteries) by Nizami Ganjavi
- 1164–67 De spirituali amicitiâ (Spiritual Friendship) and De anima (On the Soul) by Aelred of Rievaulx
- c. 1175–1200 Poema Morale
- 1185–90 The Guide for the Perplexed (دلالة الحائرين, Dalālat al-ḥā'irīn) by Maimonides
- c. 1190 Senchakushū (選択本願念仏集) by Hōnen (法然)
- 1196 Revelation of St Nicholas to a monk of Evesham

== Biography/hagiography ==
- 11th or 12th century
  - Betha Meic Creiche (Life of Mac Creiche)
  - Cogad Gáedel re Gallaib (The War of the Irish with the Foreigners, biography of Brian Boru)
- 12th century
  - De Reis van Sinte Brandaen (The Voyage of Saint Brendan)
  - Ramavataram by Kambar
  - The Life of Saint Catherine translated into Anglo-Norman by Clemence of Barking
- By 1111 Deliverance From Error (المنقذ من الضلال, al-munqidh min al-ḍalāl) by Al-Ghazali (spiritual autobiography)
- c. 1111–1115 Vita Mathildis (Life of Mathilda of Tuscany) by Donizone
- c. 1124 Vita Anselmi (Life of Anselm of Canterbury) by Eadmer (and other lives of British saints)
- 1148 Alexiad by Anna Komnene
- c. 1153 Vita Davidis Scotorum regis (Life of David, King of the Scots) by Aelred of Rievaulx
- 1153–54 Genealogia regum Anglorum (Genealogy of the Kings of the English) by Aelred of Rievaulx
- 1154–60 Vita Sancti Niniani (Life of Saint Ninian) by Aelred of Rievaulx
- c. 1160 De Sanctimoniali de Wattun (On the Nun of Watton, or De quodam miraculo miraculi, Of a Certain Wonderful Miracle) by Aelred of Rievaulx
- c. 1160–70 Het Leven van Sint Servaes (The Life of Saint Servatius) by Heinrich von Veldeke
- 1161–63 Vita S. Eduardi, regis et confessoris (Life of Saint Edward, King and Confessor) by Aelred of Rievaulx
- 1180–86 Vita Wulfrici anchoretae Haselbergiae (Life of Wulfric the anchorite of Haselbery) by John of Ford
- c. 1199 De rebus a se gestis by Gerald of Wales (autobiography)

== Epic/saga/chanson ==
- Táin Bó Cúailnge (Old Irish version in Lebor na hUidre, by 1106; Middle Irish version in Book of Leinster, c. 1160)
- Ramavataram by Kambar
- Earliest texts of the Tristan and Iseult legend
  - c. 1150–1190 Le Roman de Tristan by Béroul ("common branch"; Norman language)
  - c. 1155–1173 Tristan by Thomas of Britain ("courtly branch"; Old French)
- c. 1160 Roman d'Enéas
- c. 1165 Letter of Prester John
- c. 1180 Chanson d'Antioche
- c. 1180–1210 Nibelungenlied
- Late 12th century
  - Acallam na Senórach (Dialogue of the Ancients; Middle Irish)
  - Aiol and Mirabel (Old French)
  - Karel ende Elegast (Middle Dutch)
  - The Tale of Igor's Campaign (Слово о пълкѹ Игоревѣ, Slovo o pŭlku Igorevě; Old East Slavic)
- Chanson de Jérusalem
- Digenis Acritas
- Metrical Dindshenchas
- c. 12th century
  - Historia Caroli Magni (pseudo-history falsely attributed to Turpin (archbishop of Reims))
  - The Knight in the Panther's Skin by Shota Rustaveli
  - Mabinogion

== Romance ==
- c. 1100 Culhwch and Olwen
- c. 1155–60 Roman de Troie by Benoît de Sainte-Maure
- c. 1170 Érec et Énide by Chrétien de Troyes
- c. 1175–1200? Roman de toute chevalerie by Thomas de Kent
- c. 1176 Cligès by Chrétien de Troyes
- 1177–80 Khosrow and Shirin by Nizami Ganjavi
- c. 1177–81 by Chrétien de Troyes
  - Lancelot, le Chevalier de la Charrette
  - Yvain, le Chevalier au Lion
- c. 1180s
  - Ipomedon by Hugh of Rhuddlan
  - Protheselaus by Hugh of Rhuddlan
  - Der arme Heinrich by Hartmann von Aue
- c. 1181–91 Perceval, le Conte du Graal by Chrétien de Troyes
- c. 1190 Gregorius by Hartmann von Aue
- c. 1191–92? Erec by Hartmann von Aue
- 1192 Layla and Majnun by Nizami Ganjavi
- c. 1194? Eskandar-nameh, an Alexander romance, by Nizami Ganjavi
- 1197 Haft Peykar by Nizami Ganjavi

== Fable/allegory ==
- Dolopathos, translation of the Seven Wise Masters made by Jean de Hauteseille (Joannes de Alta Silva)
- 1121 Kalīleh o Demneh (Persian: کلیله و دمنه), translation of the Panchatantra made by Abu'l Ma'ali Nasr Allah Munshi
- c. 1147 Cosmographia by Bernardus Silvestris
- c. 1184 Architrenius by John of Hauville

== Drama ==
- Ludus de Antichristo
- Ordo Virtutum

== Lyric ==
- c. 1119 Lyric poetry by William IX, Duke of Aquitaine, in Old Occitan known
- c. 1124–27 Waka anthology Kin'yō Wakashū (Collection of Gold Leaves) compiled by Minamoto no Shunrai (源 俊頼)
- 1140s–1150s Goliardic poetry by Hugh Primas of Orléans
- c. 1151–54 Waka anthology Shika Wakashū (Collection of Word Blossom) compiled by Fujiwara no Akisue (藤原 顕季)
- 1160s Goliardic poetry by the Archpoet
- c. 1188 Waka anthology Senzai Wakashū (Millennial Collection, 千載和歌集) compiled by Fujiwara no Shunzei (藤原 俊成)
- Late 12th century Lais by Marie de France (Anglo-Norman)

== Linguistics ==
- c. 1125–1175 First Grammatical Treatise (Old Norse) by the "First Grammarian"

== Topography ==
- 1191 Itinerarium Cambriae by Gerald of Wales
- 1194 Descriptio Cambriae by Gerald of Wales
- c. 1199? De laude Cestrie by Lucian of Chester

== Treatises ==
- 1107 Treatise on Tea (大觀茶論, dà guān chá lùn) by Emperor Huizong of Song
- 1113 Comput(us) by Philip de Thaun (Anglo-Norman, in hexasyllabic couplets)
- 1121–39 Bestiaire by Philip de Thaun (Bestiary translated from Physiologus into Anglo-Norman rhyming couplets)
- 1180–84 Tractatus de Purgatorio Sancti Patricii (Treatise on the Purgatory of St Patrick) by H[enry] of Saltrey

== Encyclopedias ==
- By 1129 Manasollasa composed by Someshvara III, ruler of the south Indian Western Chalukya Empire (Sanskrit)
- 1167–85 Hortus deliciarum compiled by Herrad of Landsberg (original destroyed 1870)

== Authors ==
- Born 1100/1110: Geoffrey of Monmouth, Welsh chronicler (died 1155)
- Died 1101: August 24 Su Shi (蘇軾), Chinese poet (born 1037)
- Died 1105: July 13 Rashi, French rabbinical scholar (born 1040)
- Killed 1106: Máel Muire mac Céilechair, Irish monk and scribe
- Born 1109: April 21 – Anselm of Canterbury, Aostan-born archbishop and philosopher (born c. 1033)
- Born 1110: Aelred of Rievaulx, writer and abbot (died 1167)
- Born c. 1110: Wace, Jèrriais poet (died after 1174)
- Born c. 1110: Lawrence of Durham, English poet, hagiographer and bishop (died 1154)
- Died 1118: Florence (Florentius) of Worcester, English chronicler and monk
- Born 1121/2: Khaqani, Persian poet (died 1190)
- Born 1125: October 17 – Lu You (陸游), Chinese poet (died 1209)
- Died c. 1126: Eadmer, English ecclesiastic and historian (born c. 1060)
- Born c. 1130: Akka Mahadevi, female Indian Kannada language Vachana sahitya didactic poet (died 1160)
- Died 1131: December 4 Omar Khayyám, Persian philosopher, scientist and presumed poet (born 1048)
- Born c. 1141: Nizami Ganjavi, Seljuk Empire Persian romantic epic poet (died 1209)
- Born c. 1146: Gerald of Wales (Giraldus Cambrensis), Cambro-Norman churchman and topographer (died c. 1223)
- Died c. 1157: Henry of Huntingdon, English historian writing in Latin
- Died 1160: Ibn Quzman, al-Andalusian poet (born 1078)
- Born 1162: Fujiwara no Teika (Fujiwara no Sadaie, 藤原定家) Japanese waka poet, calligrapher and scholar (died 1241)
- Died 1167: January 12 – Aelred of Rievaulx, writer and abbot (born 1100)
- Fl. 1180s: Joseph of Exeter, English poet writing in Latin
- Fl. 1180s: H[enry] of Saltrey, English Cistercian monk writing in Latin
- Born c. 1197: Gonzalo de Berceo, Castilian poet (died by 1264)
- Fl. late 12th century: Chrétien de Troyes, Old French poet
- 12th or 13th century: Berechiah ha-Nakdan, Jewish exegete, poet and philosopher
- 12th century: Jocelyn de Brakelond, English chronicler and monk

== See also ==
- 12th century in poetry
- 11th century in literature
- 13th century in literature
- List of years in literature
