= List of Japanese-language poets =

The following is a list of Japanese-language poets.

Poets are listed alphabetically by surname (or by a widely known name, such as a pen name, with multiple names for the same poet listed separately if both are notable). Small groups of poets and articles on families of poets are listed separately, below, as are haiku masters (also in the main list). Years link to the corresponding "[year] in poetry" article.

== A ==
- Abe no Nakamaro 阿倍仲麻呂 (c. 698 – c. 770) scholar, administrator, and waka poet in the Nara period
- Aizu Yaichi 会津 八一 (1881–1956), poet, calligrapher and historian
- Kaijin Akashi 明石 海人 (1901-1939), author of poetry inspired by his leprosy
- Akazome Emon 赤染衛門 (956–1041) waka poet of the mid-Heian period; a member of both the Thirty-six Elder Poetic Sages and Kintō's 36 female poetry immortals (or "sages") of the Kamakura period
- Fuyue Anzai 安西 冬衛 (1898–1965) poet and co-founder of the magazine Shi To Shiron ("Poetry and Poetics")
- Arakida Moritake 荒木田守武 (1473–1549), the son of Negi Morihide, and a Shinto priest; said to have excelled in waka, renga, and in particular haikai
- Ikuma Arishima, 有島生馬 pen-name (together with Utosei and then Jugatsutei) of Arishima Mibuma (1882–1974), novelist, poet and painter; member of the Shirakaba literary circle
- Ariwara no Narihira 在原業平 (825–880), waka poet and nobleman; called one of the Six best Waka poets and one of the Thirty-six Poetry Immortals
- Asukai Gayū 飛鳥井雅有, also known as "Asukai Masaari" (1241–1301), Kamakura period nobleman and poet; has 86 poems in the official anthology Shokukokin Wakashū

== C ==
- Chūgan Engetsu (1300–1375), poet and Zen Buddhist monk of the Rinzai sect who headed many Zen establishments

== D ==
- Hendrik Doeff (1764–1837), the first westerner to write haiku in Japanese

== E ==
- Eifuku-mon In 永福門院, also written "Eifuku Mon'in", also known as Saionji Shōko 西園寺しょう子, 西園寺鏱子 (1271–1342) Kamakura period poet and a consort of the 92nd emperor, Fushimi; she belonged to the Kyōgoku school of verse; has poems in the Gyokuyōshū anthology

== F ==
- Sadakazu Fujii 藤井 貞和 (born 1942), Japanese poet and literary scholar
- Misao Fujimura 藤村操 (1886–1903), philosophy student and poet, largely remembered for the poem he carved into a tree before committing suicide over an unrequited love; sensationalized by Japanese newspapers after his death
- Fujiwara no Akisue 藤原顕季 (1055–1123), late Heian-period poet and nobleman, member of the Fujiwara poetic and aristocratic clan
- Fujiwara no Asatada 藤原朝忠 also 中納言朝忠 (911–966), middle Heian-period waka poet and nobleman; one of the Thirty-six Poetry Immortals; one of his poems is in the Hyakunin Isshu anthology
- Fujiwara no Atsutada 藤原敦忠, also 権中納言敦忠; also known as "Hon'in Chunagon" 本院中納言 and "Biwa Chunagon" 琵琶中納言 (906–943), middle Heian period waka poet and nobleman; one of the Thirty-six Poetry Immortals; has a poem in the Hyakunin Isshu anthology
- Fujiwara no Hamanari 藤原 浜成 (724–790), poet and a nobleman of the Nara period; best known for Kakyō Hyōshiki, the oldest extant piece of Japanese poetic criticism, in which he attempts to apply phonetic rules of Chinese poetry to Japanese poetry; son of Fujiwara no Maro
- Fujiwara no Kanesuke 藤原兼輔, also 中納言兼輔 (877–933), middle Heian waka poet and nobleman; one of the Thirty-six Poetry Immortals; has a poem is in the anthology Hyakunin Isshu, others in several imperial poetry anthologies, including Kokin Wakashū and Gosen Wakashū
- Fujiwara no Kintō 藤原公任, also known as "Shijō-dainagon" (966–1041), poet and critic; one of the Thirty-six Poetry Immortals; has poems in anthologies including the Shūi Wakashū, the Wakan rōeishū, and Shūi Wakashū
- Fujiwara no Ietaka 藤原家隆 (1158–1237), early Kamakura-period waka poet; has several poems in the Shin Kokin Wakashū anthology; related by marriage to Jakuren; pupil of Fujiwara no Shunzei's
- Fujiwara no Kiyotada 藤原清正 (died 958), poet and one of the Thirty-six Poetry Immortals; second son of Fujiwara no Kanesuke; younger brother of Fujiwara no Masatada
- Fujiwara no Masatada 藤原雅正 (died 961), poet with family connections to several other poets: first son of Fujiwara no Kanesuke; grandfather of Murasaki Shikibu ("Lady Murasaki"); older brother of Fujiwara no Kiyotada; married a daughter of Fujiwara no Sadakata; father of Fujiwara no Tametoki; also acquainted with Ki no Tsurayuki
- Fujiwara no Motozane 藤原元真 (dates unknown), a middle Heian-period waka poet and Japanese nobleman; one of the Thirty-six Poetry Immortals; has poems in imperial anthologies, including the Shin Kokin Wakashū
- Fujiwara no Nakafumi 藤原仲文. also "Nakafun" (923–992) middle Heian period waka poet and nobleman; one of the Thirty-six Poetry Immortals; has poems in several imperial anthologies, including the Chokusen Wakashū
- Fujiwara no Nagayoshi 藤原長能, also known as "Fujiwara no Nagatō" (949 – death year unknown), poet and a court bureaucrat of the Heian period; one of the "Thirty-six Poetry Immortals"; taught waka to the poet Nōin
- Fujiwara no Okikaze 藤原興風 (dates unknown), middle Heian-period waka poet and nobleman; one of the Thirty-six Poetry Immortals; has a poem in the Hyakunin Isshu anthology and several imperial poetry anthologies, including Kokin Wakashū
- Fujiwara no Sadakata 藤原定方, also known as "Sanjō Udaijin" 三条右大臣 (873–932), father of poet Asatada, cousin and father-in-law of Kanesuke; has a poem in Hyakunin Isshu anthology
- Fujiwara no Shunzei 藤原俊成, also known as "Fujiwara no Toshinari", "Shakua" 釈阿, "Akihiro" 顕広 (1114–1204), poet and nobleman, noted for his innovations in the waka poetic form and for compiling Senzai Wakashū ("Collection of a Thousand Years"), the seventh Imperial anthology of waka poetry; father of Fujiwara no Teika; son of Fujiwara no Toshitada
- Fujiwara no Takamitsu 藤原高光 (c. 939–994), middle Heian-period waka poet and nobleman; one of the Thirty-six Poetry Immortals; has poems in imperial poetry anthologies starting with Gosen Wakashū
- Fujiwara no Tameie 藤原為家 (1198–1275), the central figure in a circle of poets after the Jōkyū War in 1221; second son of poets Teika and Abutuni
- Fujiwara no Tametoki 藤原為時 (died 1029?), poet, minor official and governor of various provinces, scholar of Chinese literature and the father of Murasaki Shikibu ("Lady Murasaki")
- Fujiwara no Teika 藤原定家, also known as "Fujiwara no Sadaie" or "Sada-ie" (1162–1242), a widely venerated late Heian period and early Kamakura period waka poet and (for centuries) extremely influential critic; also a scribe, scholar and widely influential anthologist; the Tale of Matsura is generally attributed to him; son of Fujiwara no Shunzei; associated with Jakuren
- Fujiwara no Toshiyuki 藤原敏行, also "Fujiwara Toshiyuki no Ason" 藤原敏行朝亜 (birthdate unknown, died in 901 or 907), middle Heian period waka poet and nobleman; one of the Thirty-six Poetry Immortals; has a poem in the anthology Hyakunin Isshu and poems in several imperial poetry anthologies, including Kokin Wakashū and Gosen Wakashū
- Fukuda Chiyo-ni 千代尼, or Kaga no Chiyo, (1703–1775), prominent female haiku poet of the Edo period
- Yoshihiko Funazaki 舟崎 克彦 (born 1945), novelist, poet, illustrator, manga writer, songwriter, and academic

== G ==
- Robin D. Gill (1951–), American japanologist who uses the haigō Keigu (敬愚)
- Emperor Go-Toba, 後鳥羽天皇, also known as 山科僧正 (1180–1239)
- Gyōi 行意 (1177–1217?), late Heian, early Kamakura period poet and Buddhist monk; one of the New Thirty-six Poetry Immortals; son of Fujiwara no Motofusa

== H ==
- Hagiwara Hiromichi 萩原広道 (1815–1863), late-Edo period scholar of literature, philology, and nativist studies (Kokugaku) as well as an author, translator, and poet; known for his commentary and literary analysis of The Tale of Genji
- Sakutarō Hagiwara 萩原 朔太郎 (1886–1942), Taishō and early Shōwa period literary critic and free-verse poet called the "father of modern colloquial poetry in Japan"
- Hanabusa Itchō 英一蝶 (1652–1724), painter, calligrapher, and haiku poet
- Fumiko Hayashi 林 芙美子 (1903 or 1904 (sources disagree) – 1951), female novelist, writer and poet
- Lafcadio Hearn also known as Koizumi Yakumo 小泉八雲 (1850 – 1904)
- Hinatsu Kōnosuke 日夏耿之介, a pen-name of Higuchi Kunito (1890–1971), poet, editor and academic known for romantic and gothic poetry patterned after English literature; fervent Roman Catholic, co-founder, with Horiguchi Daigaku and Yaso Saijō, of Shijin ("Poets") magazine
- Hiraide Shū 平出修 (1878–1914), late Meiji period novelist, poet, and lawyer; represented defendant in the High Treason Incident; a co-founder of the literary journal Subaru
- Hirato Renkichi 平戸 廉吉 (1893–1922), Taisho era avant-garde poet
- Hori Tatsuo 堀 辰雄 (1904–1953), Shōwa period writer, poet and translator
- Horiguchi Daigaku 堀口 大学 1892–1981), Taishō and Shōwa period poet and translator of French literature; a member of the Shinshisha ("The New Poetry Society"); accompanied his father on overseas diplomatic postings
- Tatsuko Hoshino 星野立子 (1903–1984), Shōwa period haiku female poet and travel writer; founded Tamamo, a haiku magazine exclusively for women; in the Hototogisu literary circle; haiku selector for Asahi Shimbun newspaper; contributed to haiku columns in various newspapers and magazines
- Hoshino Tenchi 星野天知 (1862–1950), Meiji period poet and martial arts master; a co-founder of Bungakukai literary magazine; 8th Grand Master and a teacher of the Yagyu Shinkage-ryu martial-arts school
- Hosokawa Fujitaka 細川藤孝, also known as Hosokawa Yūsai 細川幽斎 (1534–1610), a Sengoku period feudal warlord who was a prominent retainer of the last Ashikaga shōguns; father of Hosokawa Tadaoki, an Oda clan senior general; after the 1582 Incident at Honnō-ji, he took the Buddhist tonsure and changed his name to "Yūsai"; but he remained an active force in politics, under Shōguns Toyotomi Hideyoshi and Tokugawa Ieyasu

== I ==
- Dakotsu Iida 飯田 蛇笏, commonly referred to as "Dakotsu", pen names of Takeji Iida 飯田 武治 (1885–1962), haiku poet; trained under Takahama Kyoshi
- Ikezawa Natsuki 池澤夏樹 (born 1945), novelist, essayist, translator and poet who stopped publishing poetry in 1982
- Ikkyū 休宗純, Ikkyū Sōjun 1394–1481), eccentric, iconic, Rinzai Zen Buddhist priest, poet and sometime mendicant flute player who influenced Japanese art and literature with an infusion of Zen attitudes and ideals; one of the creators of the formal Japanese tea ceremony; well-known to Japanese children through various stories and the subject of a popular Japanese children's television program; made a character in anime fiction
- Inoue Kenkabō 井上剣花坊 pen name of Inoue Koichi (1870–1934), late Meiji, Taishō and early Shōwa period journalist and writer of senryū (short, humorous verse)
- Lady Ise 伊勢 or Ise no miyasudokoro 伊勢の御息所 (c. 875 – c. 938), waka poet and noblewoman in the Imperial court; granddaughter of waka poet Ōnakatomi no Yoshinobu; born the Fujiwara no Tsugikage of Ise; lover of the Prince Atsuyoshi; a concubine to Emperor Uda; her son by him was Prince Yuki-Akari; has many poems in the Kokin Wakashū anthology
- Ishigaki Rin 石垣りん (1920–2004), poet, employee of the Industrial Bank of Japan, sometimes called "the bank teller poet"
- Jun Ishikawa 石川淳 pen name of Ishikawa Kiyoshi, Ishikawa (1899–1987), Shōwa period modernist author, translator and literary critic
- Ishikawa Takuboku see Takuboku Ishikawa
- Ishizuka Tomoji 石塚友二 the kanji (Japanese writing) is a pen name of Ishizuka Tomoji, which is written with the different kanji 石塚友次, but in English there is no difference (1906–1984), Shōwa period haiku poet and novelist
- Itō Sachio 伊藤佐千夫, pen name of Itō Kojirō (1864–1913), Meiji period tanka poet and novelist
- Izumi Shikibu 和泉式部 nicknamed "The Floating Lady" 浮かれ女 for her series of passionate affairs (born c. 976 – year of death unknown, sometime after 1033), mid-Heian period poet, novelist and noblewoman; one of the Thirty-six Poetry Immortals; known for a sequence of affairs at the court in the capital; close friend of Akazome Emon, rival of Lady Murasaki, and mother of poet Koshikibu no Naishi; poetry praised by Fujiwara no Kintō

== J ==
- Jakuren 寂蓮, also known as "Fujiwara no Sadanaga" 藤原定長 before becoming a monk (1139–1202), initially adopted by Fujiwara no Shunzei, later stepped aside as Shunzei's heir and became a Buddhist priest; on the model of Saigyō, traveled around the country, composing poems; frequently associated with Fujiwara no Teika; one of six compilers of the eighth imperial waka anthology, Shin Kokin Wakashū, which contains 36 of his poems; adopted Fujiwara no Ietaka, a pupil of Shunzei's; has a poem in the Hyakunin Isshu anthology
- Jakushitsu Genkō 寂室元光 (1290–1367), Rinzai Zen master, poet, flute player, and first abbot of Eigen-ji, which was constructed solely for him to teach Zen
- Jien 慈円 (1155–1225) poet, historian, and Buddhist monk
- Jinzai Kiyoshi 神西清 (1903–1957) Shōwa-period novelist, translator, literary critic, poet and playwright
- Empress Jitō 持統天皇 (645–703; 702 in the lunisolar calendar used in Japan until 1873), 41st imperial ruler, fourth empress and a poet

== K ==
- Kada no Azumamaro 荷田春満 (1669–1736), early Edo period poet, philologist and teacher as well as poetry tutor to one of the sons of Emperor Reigen; together with Keichū, co-founder of the kokugaku ("national studies") intellectual movement
- Kaga no Chiyo see Fukuda Chiyo-ni
- Kakinomoto no Hitomaro 柿本 人麻呂 (c. 662–710), late Asuka period poet, nobleman and government official; the most prominent poet in the Man'yōshū anthology
- Kambara Ariake 蒲原有明 pen-name of Kambara Hayao (1876–1952), Taishō- and Shōwa-period poet and novelist
- Kamo no Chōmei 鴨長明 (1155–1216), author, waka poet and essayist
- Kamo no Mabuchi 賀茂真淵 (1697–1769), Edo-period poet and philologist
- Kamo no Yasunori no musume (late 10th century), daughter of Kamo no Yasunori, personal name unknown; Heian-period poet
- Lady Kasa 笠女郎 (fl. early 8th century) waka poet
- Jun Kawada 川田 順 (1882–1966, Shōwa-period tanka poet and entrepreneur
- Ryuko Kawaji 川路柳虹, pen-name of Kawaki Makoto (1888–1959), Shōwa-period poet and literary critic
- Kikuko Kawakami 川上 喜久子 (1904–1985), Shōwa-period female novelist, short-story writer and poet
- Ki no Tokibumi 紀時文 (922–996), one of the Five Men of the Pear Chamber
- Ki no Tomonori 紀友則 (c. 850 – c. 904), early Heian-period waka poet of the court, one of the Thirty-six Poetry Immortals; one of the four compilers of the Kokin Wakashū anthology
- Ki no Tsurayuki 紀貫之 (872–945) Heian period waka poet, government official and courtier; son of Ki no Mochiyuki; one of four compilers of the Kokin Wakashū anthology; provincial governor of Tosa province (930–935) and later possibly governor of Suō Province
- Kyōsuke Kindaichi 金田一 京助 (1882–1971), linguist and poet; his son is linguist Haruhiko Kindaichi
- Kinoshita Rigen 木下利玄, pen-name of Kinoshita Toshiharu (1886–1925), Meiji- and Taishō-periodtanka poet
- Kisen 喜撰 also known as "Kisen Hōshi" 喜撰法師 (fl. early 9th century), early Heian-period Buddhist monk and poet
- Kishi Joō 徽子女王, also Yoshiko Joō 承香殿女御 Jokyōden Joō or 斎宮女御 Saigū no Nyōgo (929–985), middle Heian period Waka poet
- Eriko Kishida 岸田 衿子 (1929-2011), poet, lyricist, children's author, and translator
- Yaho Kitabatake 北畠 八穂 (1903–1982), Shōwa-period poet and children's fiction writer
- Fuyuhiko Kitagawa 北川冬彦 (1900–1990), modernist poet and film critic
- Hakushū Kitahara 北原 白秋, pen-name of Kitahara Ryūkichi 北原 隆吉 (1885–1942), Taishō- and Shōwa-period tanka poet
- Kitamura Tokoku 北村透谷, pen-name of Kitamura Montarō (1868–1894) late Meiji-period poet, essayist and a founder of the modern Japanese romantic literary movement
- Takeshi Kitano 北野 武 (born 1947), filmmaker, film editor, screenwriter, comedian, actor, author, poet and painter
- Katué Kitasono 北園克衛 (1902–1978), modernist poet, graphic designer and photographer
- Kiyohara no Motosuke, 清原元輔 (908–990), one of the Five Men of the Pear Chamber
- Kobayashi Issa 小林一茶 (1763–1828), poet and Buddhist priest known for his haiku and haibun; widely regarded as one of the four haiku masters in Japan, along with Bashō, Buson and Shiki
- Kodai no Kimi 小大君, also "Ōkimi" (dates unknown), middle Heian-period Waka poet and noble; one of five women among the Thirty-six Poetry Immortals; has many poems in imperial poetry anthologies
- Yakumo Koizumi 小泉八雲 see Lafcadio Hearn
- Mantarō Kubota 久保田万太郎 (1889–1963), author, playwright and poet
- Kūkai 空海, also known posthumously as "Kōbō-Daishi" 弘法大師 (774–835), monk, scholar, poet, and artist who founded the Shingon or "True Word" school of Buddhism, followers of that school usually refer to him by the honorific title "Odaishisama" お大師様
- Masao Kume 久米正雄 (1891–1952), late Taishō-period and early Shōwa-period playwright, novelist and haiku poet (under the pen-name of Santei)
- Kunikida Doppo 國木田 獨歩 (1871–1908), Meiji-period romantic poet and one of the novelists who pioneered naturalism in Japan
- Sadako Kurihara 栗原貞子 (1913–2005), poet who survived the Hiroshima nuclear holocaust there and became known for her poems about her city

== M ==
- Manko 万乎| (birth year unknown – 1724) middle Edo period poet and wealthy merchant; apprentice of Matsuo Bashō
- Sami Mansei 沙弥満誓 ("novice Mansei"), secular name was Kasa no Ason Maro (fl. c. 720), Buddhist priest and poet; a member of Ōtomo no Tabito's literary circle; has poems in the Man'yōshū anthology
- Kaoru Maruyama 丸山 薫 (1899–1974)
- Masamune Atsuo 正宗敦夫 (1881–1958), poet and academic
- Masaoka Shiki 正岡 子規, pen name of Masaoka Tsunenori 正岡 常規, who changed his name to Noboru 升 (1867–1902), author, poet, literary critic, journalist and, early in his life, a baseball player
- Matsudaira Katamori 松平容保 (1836–1893), samurai and poet in the last days of the Edo period and the early-to-mid Meiji period
- Matsudaira Teru 松平照 also called "Teruhime" 照姫, literally translated, "Princess Teru" (1832–1884), late Edo and early Meiji period aristocrat and skilled waka poet who instructed Matsudaira Katamori in poetry and calligraphy
- Takashi Matsumoto 松本たかし(1906–1956), Shōwa period professional haiku poet in the Shippo-kai haiku circle, then, starting in 1929, in the Hototogisu group that also included Kawabata Bosha; founded a literary magazine, Fue ("Flute") in 1946
- Matsuo Bashō 松尾 芭蕉 (1644–1694), the most famous Edo-period poet, recognized for his works in the collaborative haikai no renga form; now more widely recognized as a master of haiku
- Mibu no Tadami 壬生忠見 (dates unknown), middle Heian period waka poet and nobleman; one of the Thirty-six Poetry Immortals; son of poet Mibu no Tadamine
- Mibu no Tadamine 壬生忠岑 (active 898–920), early Heian period waka poet of the court; one of the Thirty-six Poetry Immortals; father of Mibu no Tadami
- Michio Mado (1909–2014), poet who worked for the Office of the Governor-General of Taiwan
- Taku Miki 三木卓 pen name of Tomita Miki (born 1935), Shōwa period poet and novelist in the Han ("Inundation") poetry circle
- Minakami Takitarō 水上滝太郎 pen name of Abe Shōzō (1887–1940), Shōwa period poet, novelist, literary critic and essayist
- Minamoto no Kintada 源公忠, also 源公忠朝臣 (889–948), middle Heian period waka poet and nobleman; one of the Thirty-six Poetry Immortals, along with his son Minamoto no Saneakira; an official in the imperial treasury; has poems in imperial poetry anthologies, starting with the Goshūi Wakashū
- Minamoto no Muneyuki 源宗于, also Minamoto no Muneyuki Ason 源宗于朝臣 (died 983), early Heian period waka poet and nobleman; one of the Thirty-six Poetry Immortals; has a poem in the Hyakunin Isshu anthology
- Minamoto no Saneakira 源信明 (910–970), middle Heian period waka poet and nobleman; he and his father, Minamoto no Kintada, are two of the Thirty-six Poetry Immortals; his poems are in imperial poetry anthologies from the Goshūi Wakashū onward
- Minamoto no Shigeyuki 源重之 (died 1000), early Heian period waka poet and nobleman; one of the Thirty-six Poetry Immortals; has a poem in the Hyakunin Isshu anthology
- Minamoto no Shitagō 源順 (911–983), waka poet, scholar and nobleman; one of the Five Men of the Pear Chamber (who compiled the Gosen Wakashū) and the Thirty-six Poetry Immortals; author of the Minamoto no Shitagōshū poetry collection; some scholars claim that he also wrote the Taketori Monogatari; original compiler of the Wamyō Ruijushō, the first extant Japanese dictionary organized into semantic headings
- Minamoto no Shunrai, also "Minamoto Toshiyori", (c. 1057–1129) poet who compiled the Kin'yō Wakashū anthology; passed over to compile the Goshūi Wakashū, Shunrai's angry polemical, "Errors in the Goshūishū", apparently led Emperor Shirakawa to appoint him to compile the Kin'yōshū imperial anthology, which was itself controversial
- Minamoto no Yorimasa 源頼政 (1106–1180) poet, government official and warrior; his poems appeared in various anthologies
- Yukio Mishima 三島 由紀夫. pen name of Kimitake Hiraoka 平岡 公威 (1925–1970), author, poet and playwright
- Kenji Miyazawa 宮沢 賢治 (1896–1933), early Shōwa period poet and author of children's literature
- Tatsuji Miyoshi 三好達治 1900–1964), Shōwa period literary critic, editor and poet
- Mizuta Masahide 17th century, Edo period poet and samurai who studied under Basho
- Mori Ōgai 森 鷗外 / 森 鴎外 (1862–1922) physician, translator, novelist and poet
- Motoori Norinaga 本居宣長 (1730–1801) Edo-period scholar of Kokugaku, physician and poet
- Munenaga 宗良 親王 (1311 – c. 1385) Nanboku-chō period imperial prince (eighth son of Emperor Godaigo) and poet of the Nijō poetic school who is known for his compilation of the Shin'yō Wakashū poetry anthology
- Murasaki Shikibu 紫 式 部, not her real name, which is unknown; often called "Lady Murasaki" (c. 973 – c. 1014 or 1025), Heian-period novelist who wrote The Tale of Genji, poet, and a maid of honor of the imperial court
- Saneatsu Mushanokōji 武者小路 実篤 實篤, sometimes known as "Mushakōji Saneatsu"; other pen-names included "Musha" and "Futo-o" (1885–1976), late Taishō period and Shōwa-period novelist, playwright, poet, artist and philosopher

== N ==
- Nagai Tatsuo 永井龍男, used the pen-name of "Tomonkyo" for his poetry (1904–1990), Shōwa-period novelist, short-story writer, haiku poet, editor and journalist
- Hideo Nagata 長田秀雄 (1885–1949), Shōwa-period poet, playwright and screenwriter
- Nagata Mikihiko 長田幹彦 (1887–1964), Shōwa-period poet, playwright and screenwriter
- Takashi Nagatsuka 長塚 節 (1879–1915), poet and novelist
- Naitō Jōsō (1662–1704), Genroku-era haiku poet, a principal disciple of Bashō
- Chūya Nakahara 中原 中也 (1907–1937), early Shōwa-period poet
- Fumiko Nakajō 中城ふみ子, pen name of Noe Fumiko 野江富美子 (1922–1954), tanka poet who died at age 32 after a turbulent life and struggle with breast cancer, as recorded in her poetry
- Nakatsukasa 中務 (912–991), middle Heian-period Waka poet
- Nanao Sakaki (1923–2008), poet and leading personality of "the Tribe", a counter-cultural group
- Natsume Sōseki 夏目 漱石 (commonly referred to as "Sōseki"), pen name of Natsume Kinnosuke 夏目金之助 (1867–1916), Meiji-era novelist, haiku poet, composer of Chinese-style poetry, writer of fairy tales and a scholar of English literature; from 1984–2004, his portrait was on the 1000 yen note
- Nishiwaki Junzaburo 西脇順三郎 (1894–1982), Shōwa-period poet and literary critic
- Nishiyama Sōin see Sōin
- Yone Noguchi 野口米次郎 (1875–1947), poet, fiction writer, essayist, and literary critic in both English and Japanese; father of the sculptor Isamu Noguchi
- Nozawa Bonchō see Bonchō
- Princess Nukata 額田王 also known as Princess Nukada (c. 630–690), Asuka-period poet
- Nōin 能因, lay name: Tachibana no Nagayasu 橘永愷 (988 – c. 1051), late Heian-period poet and monk; one of the "Thirty-six Medieval Poetry Immortals"
- Nozawa Bonchō 野沢 凡兆 (c. 1640 – 1714), haikai poet and student of Matsuo Bashō

== O ==
- Ogiwara Seisensui 荻原井泉水, pen name of Ogiwara Tōkichi (1884–1976), haiku poet in the Taishō and Shōwa periods
- Okamoto Kanoko 岡本かの子, pen name of Ohnuki Kano (1889–1939) author, tanka poet, and Buddhist scholar in the Taishō and early Shōwa periods; mother of artist Tarō Okamoto
- Ōnakatomi no Yorimoto 大中臣頼基 (c. 886–958), middle Heian period waka poet and nobleman; one of the Thirty-six Poetry Immortals
- Ōnakatomi no Yoshinobu, 大中臣能宣 (921–991) one of the Five Men of the Pear Chamber
- Ono no Komachi 小野 小町 or おののこまち (c. 825 – c. 900), early Heian period waka poet, one of the Rokkasen — the Six best Waka poets; one of the Thirty-six Poetry Immortals; noted as a rare beauty and became a symbol of a beautiful woman in Japan
- Saishū Onoe 尾上柴舟 (1876–1957), tanka poet and calligrapher
- Makoto Ōoka 大岡信 (1931–2017), poet and literary critic
- Shinobu Orikuchi 折口 信夫, also known as Chōkū Shaku 釋 迢空 (1887–1953), ethnologist, linguist, folklorist, novelist and poet; a disciple of Kunio Yanagita, he established an academic field named "Orikuchiism" (折口学, Orikuchigaku), a mix of Japanese folklore, Japanese classics, and Shintō religion
- Osada Hiroshi 長田弘, (1939–2015) poet and author known for his contributions to contemporary literature and children's literature.
- Ōshikōchi no Mitsune 凡河内躬恒 (898–922), early Heian period administrator and waka poet of the court; one of the Thirty-six Poetry Immortals
- Ōta Dōkan 太田道灌 (1432–1486), also known as "Ōta Sukenaga" (太田資長 or "Ōta Dōkan Sukenaga" samurai warrior-poet, military tactician and Buddhist monk; said to have been a skilled poet, but only fragments attributed to him have survived
- Ōta Nanpo 大田南畝, the most oft-used penname of Ōta Tan, whose other pen names include Yomo no Akara, Yomo Sanjin, Kyōkaen, and Shokusanjin 蜀山人 (1749–1823), late Edo period Japanese poet and fiction writer
- Mizuho Ōta 太田水穂 pen-name of "Teiichi Ōta" 太田 貞, he occasionally also used another pen name, "Mizuhonoya" (1876–1955), Shōwa period poet and literary scholar
- Ōtagaki Rengetsu 太田垣蓮月 (1791–1875), Buddhist nun, widely regarded to have been one of the greatest Japanese poets of the 19th century; potter, painter and expert calligrapher
- Ōtomo no Kuronushi 大友黒主, poet, one of the Rokkasen, the "Six Poetic Geniuses"; considered one of the greatest masters of waka poetry
- Ōtomo no Sakanoue no Iratsume (c. 700–750), early Nara period female poet; member of the prestigious Ōtomo clan; has 79 poems in the Man'yōshū anthology
- Ōtomo no Tabito 大伴旅人 (c. 662–731) poet best known as the father of Ōtomo no Yakamochi; both contributed to compiling the Man'yōshū anthology; member of the prestigious Ōtomo clan; served as governor-general of Dazaifu, the military procuracy in northern Kyūshū, from 728-730
- Ōtomo no Yakamochi 大伴家持 (c. 718–785), Nara period statesman and waka poet; one of the Thirty-six Poetry Immortals; member of the prestigious Ōtomo clan; son of Ōtomo no Tabito, older brother of Ōtomo no Kakimochi, nephew of Ōtomo no Sakanoue no Iratsume
- Ozaki Hōsai 尾崎 放哉 pen name of Ozaki Hideo (1885–1926), late Meiji period and Taishō period poet
- Ozaki Kihachi 尾崎喜八 (1892–1974), Shōwa period poet
- Ozaki Kōyō 尾崎 紅葉, pen name of Ozaki Tokutaro 尾崎 徳太郎 (1868–1903), novelist, essayist and haiku poet

== R ==
- Ryōkan 良寛 (1758–1831), waka poet and calligrapher, Buddhist monk, hermit

== S ==
- Saigyō Hōshi 西行法師 pen name of Satō Norikiyo 佐藤義清, who took the religious name En'i 円位 (1118–1190), late Heian and early Kamakura period waka poet who worked as a guard to retired Emperor Toba, then became a Buddhist monk at age 22
- Mokichi Saitō (1882–1953), Taishō period poet of the Araragi school, and a psychiatrist; father of novelist Kita Morio
- Sakae Tsuboi 壺井栄 (1899–1967), novelist and poet
- Sakanoue no Korenori 坂上是則 (fl. 9th century), early Heian waka poet; one of the Thirty-six Poetry Immortals; has a poem in the Hyakunin Isshu anthology
- Sakanoue no Mochiki, 坂上望城, (dates unknown) one of the Five Men of the Pear Chamber
- Santō Kyōden 山東京伝, pen name of Samuru Iwase 岩瀬醒, also known popularly as "Kyōya Denzō" 京屋伝蔵 (1761–1816), Edo period poet, writer and artist; brother of Santō Kyōzan
- Taneda Santōka 種田 山頭火 pen name of Taneda Shōichi 種田 正一 (1882–1940), author and free-verse haiku poet
- Sarumaru no Taifu (fl. 9th century) 猿丸大夫, also known as "Sarumaru no Dayū", early Heian period waka poet; one of the Thirty Six Poetic Sages; no detailed histories or legends about him exist, and he may never have existed; some believe he was Prince Yamashiro no Ōe
- Mikirō Sasaki 佐々木幹郎, also known as "Mikio Sasaki", (born 1947), poet and travel writer
- Sasaki Nobutsuna 佐佐木信綱 (1872–1963), Shōwa period tanka poet and scholar of the Nara and Heian periods
- Satomura Shōkyū 里村昌休 (1510–1552), leading master of the linked verse renga after the death of Tani Sobuko in 1545
- Sei Shōnagon 清少納言 (c. 966–1017), middle Heian period author, poet and court lady who served Empress Teishi/Empress Sadako; best known as the author of The Pillow Book
- Semimaru 蝉丸, also known as "Semimaro" (fl. 9th century), early Heian period poet and musician; some accounts say he was a son of Uda Tennō, Prince Atsumi, or that he was the fourth son of Daigo Tennō; some claim he lived during the reign of Ninmyō Tennō
- Senge Motomaro 千家元麿 (1888–1948), Taishō and Shōwa period poet
- Sesson Yūbai 雪村友梅 (1290–1348), poet and Buddhist priest of the Rinzai sect who founded temples
- Mitsuko Shiga 四賀光子, pen-name of Mitsu Ota (1885–1956), female Taishō and Shōwa period tanka poet
- Princess Shikishi 式子内親王 (died 1201), late Heian and early Kamakura period poet, never-married daughter of Emperor Go-Shirakawa; entered service at the Kamo Shrine in Kyoto in 1159, later left the shrine, in later years a Buddhist nun; has 49 poems in the Shin Kokin Shū anthology
- Shimizu Motoyoshi 清水基吉 (1918–2008), Shōwa and Heisei period novelist and poet
- Shirome (fl. 10th century), minor female waka poet and common prostitute
- Shizue Iwatsuki (1897–1984), who began writing in tanka, a traditional genre of Japanese poetry, and who immigrated to the United States
- Shunzei's Daughter, popular name of Fujiwara Toshinari no Musume 藤原俊成女、, also 藤原俊成卿女、皇(太)后宮大夫俊成(卿)女, 越部禅尼 (c. 1171 – c. 1252), called the greatest female poet of her day, ranked with Princess Shikishi; her grandfather was the poet Fujiwara no Shunzei
- Shōtetsu 正徹 (1381–1459), considered by some the last great poet in the courtly waka tradition; his disciples were important in the development of renga, which led to haiku
- Sōgi 宗祇 (1421–1502), Zen monk who studied waka and renga poetry, then became a professional renga poet in his thirties
- Nishiyama Sōin 西山宗因, born Nishiyama Toyoichi 西山豊一 (1605–1682), early Tokugawa period haikai-no-renga (comical renga) poet who founded the Danrin school of haikai poetry
- Sion Sono 園 子温 (born 1961), controversial avant-garde poet and filmmaker
- Sonome 斯波 園女 (1664–1726), female poet, friend and noted correspondent of Matsuo Bashō
- Sugawara no Michizane 菅原道真, also known as "Kan Shōjō" 菅丞相, (845–903), Heian Period scholar, poet and politician; grandson of Sugawara no Kiyotomo; also wrote Chinese poetry
- Hiromi Suzuki 鈴木 博美 (dates unknown), illustrator, poet, and fiction writer

== T ==
- Tachibana Akemi, 橘曙覧 (1812–1868), poet and classical scholar
- Tachihara Michizō 立原道造 (1914–1939), poet and architect
- Taira no Kanemori 平兼盛 (died 991), middle Heian period waka poet and nobleman; one of the Thirty-six Poetry Immortals; has a poem in the Hyakunin Isshu anthology; father of poet Akazome Emon
- Kyoshi Takahama 高浜 虚子, pen name of Kiyoshi Takahama (1874–1959), Shōwa-period poet; close disciple of Masaoka Shiki
- Motokichi Takahashi 高橋元吉 (1893–1965), Taishō and Shōwa period poet
- Shinkichi Takahashi (高橋 新吉 Takahashi Shinkichi, 1901 – 1987) He was one of the pioneers of Dadaism in Japan.According to Makoto Ueda, he is also the only major Zen poet of modern Japanese literature.
- Jun Takami 高見順 pen-name of Takama Yoshioa (1907–1965), Shōwa period novelist and poet
- Kōtarō Takamura 高村 光太郎 (1883–1956), poet and sculptor; son of sculptor Kōun Takamura
- Chieko Takamura (1886–1938)
- Takamure Itsue 高群逸枝 (1894–1964), poet, writer, feminist, anarchist, ethnologist and historian
- Takarai Kikaku 宝井其角, also known as "Enomoto Kikaku" (1661–1707), haikai poet and disciple of Matsuo Bashō
- Tsugi Takano 鷹野 つぎ (1890–1943), female novelist and poet
- Takuboku Ishikawa 石川 啄木 (1886–1912), tanka and free-verse poet
- Tamura Ryūichi 田村隆 (1923–1998), Shōwa period poet, essayist and translator of English-language novels and poetry
- Jun Tanaka 田中純 1890–1966), Shōwa period poet
- Taneda Santōka see Santōka
- Tani Soyo 谷宗養 (1526–1563), renga poet; a rival of Satomura Joha; son of Tani Sobuko
- Shuntarō Tanikawa 谷川 俊太郎 (born 1931), poet and translator
- Tatsunojō, pen name of Yokoi Yayū
- Machi Tawara 俵万智 (born 1962), writer, translator and poet
- Shūji Terayama 寺山 修司 (1935–1983), avant-garde poet, playwright, writer, film director and photographer
- Ton'a 頓阿 also spelled as "Tonna"; lay name: Nikaidō Sadamune 二階堂貞宗 (1289–1372), poet and Buddhist monk
- Shigeji Tsuboi 壺井繁治 (1897–1975)
- Jun Tsuji 辻 潤 (1884–1944), author, poet, essayist, musician and bohemian

== U ==
- Ueda Akinari, 上田 秋成, also known as "Ueda Shūsei" (1734–1809), author, scholar and waka poet

== W ==
- Bokusui Wakayama, 若山 牧水 (1885–1928), Japanese "Naturalist" tanka poet

== Y ==
- Yagi Jūkichi 八木重吉 (1898–1927)
- Yamabe no Akahito 山部赤人 or 山邊赤人 (700–736), Nara period poet with 13 chōka (long poems) and 37 tanka (short poems) in the Man'yōshū anthology; has been called the kami of poetry, and Waka Nisei along with Kakinomoto no Hitomaro; one of the Thirty-six Poetry Immortals
- Bochō Yamamura 山村 暮鳥 (1884–1924), vagabond Christian preacher who gained attention as a writer of tales and songs for children and as a poet
- Yamanoue no Okura 山上 憶良 (660–733), best known for his poems of children and commoners; has poems in the Man'yōshū anthology
- Sansei Yamao (1938–2001), friend of American poet Gary Snyder
- Yamazaki Sōkan 山崎宗鑑, pen name of Shina Norishige (1465–1553), renga and haikai poet, court calligrapher for Shōgun Ashikaga Yoshihisa; became a secluded Buddhist monk following the shōgun's death in 1489
- Yamazaki Hōdai 山崎方代 (1914–1985), Shōwa period tanka poet
- Rie Yasumi やすみ りえ pen name of Reiko Yasumi 休 理英子 (born 1972), senryū poet
- Jun'ichi Yoda 与田凖 (1905–1997), Shōwa period poet and children's book author
- Yokoi Yayū 横井 也有, born Yokoi Tokitsura (横井 時般) and took the pseudonym Tatsunojō (1702–1783), samurai, scholar of Kokugaku, and a haikai poet (family name: Yokoi)
- Yosa Buson see Buson
- Yosa Buson 与謝蕪村 (1716–1783), Edo-period poet and painter; along with Matsuo Bashō and Kobayashi Issa, considered among the greatest poets of the Edo period and one of the greatest haiku poets of all time
- Akiko Yosano 与謝野 晶子 pen-name of Yosano Shiyo (1878–1942), late Meiji period, Taishō period and early Shōwa period poet, pioneering feminist, pacifist and social reformer; one of the most famous, and most controversial, post-classical woman poets of Japan
- Tekkan Yosano 与謝野 鉄幹 pen-name of Yosano Hiroshi (1873–1935), late Meiji period, Taishō and early Shōwa period author and poet; husband of author Yosano Akiko.; grandfather of cabinet minister and politician Kaoru Yosano
- Yoshii Isamu 吉井勇 (1886–1960), Taishō and Shōwa period tanka poet and playwright
- Takaaki Yoshimoto 吉本隆明, also known as "Ryūmei Yoshimoto" (born 1924), poet, literary critic, and philosopher; father of the writer Banana Yoshimoto and cartoonist Haruno Yoiko
- Yoshino Hideo 吉野秀雄 (1902–1967), Shōwa period tanka poet

== Groups and schools ==
- Danrin school
- Five Men of the Pear Chamber
- Nijō poetic school
- Rokujō family
- Six best Waka poets
- Thirty-six Poetry Immortals

== Haiku masters ==
- Matsuo Bashō
- Yosa Buson
- Fukuda Chiyo-ni
- Kobayashi Issa
- Masaoka Shiki

== See also ==
- Haiku
- Japanese poetry
- Kanshi (poetry written in Chinese by Japanese poets)
- List of Japanese poetry anthologies
- Waka including tanka
- Timeline Infographic of Japanese Language Poets
