= 9th century in poetry =

Years link to corresponding "[year] in poetry" articles.

== Arabic world ==
=== Works ===
- The Book of One Thousand and One Nights is compiled in Baghdad

=== Poets ===
==== Births of Arabic world poets ====
- 742 – Ibrahim Al-Mausili (died 804)
- c. 805 – Abu Tammam (died 845)
- 820 – al-Buhturi (died 897)
- 861 – Abdullah ibn al-Mu'tazz (died 908)
- 897 – Abu al-Faraj al-Isfahani (died 967)

==== Deaths of Arabic world poets ====
- 809 – Abbas Ibn al-Ahnaf (born 750) (عباس بن الأحنف)
- 813 – Abu Nuwas (born 750)
- 828 – Abu-l-'Atahiya (born 748)
- 837 – Ibn Duraid
- 845 – Abu Tammam (born c. 805)
- 896 – Ibn al-Rumi
- 897 – al-Buhturi (born 820)

== Turkic world ==
- Possible early date for the oral development of the Book of Dede Korkut

== Persia ==
=== Persian poets ===
- Rudaki (رودکی)
- Mansur Al-Hallaj (منصور حلاج)
- Shahid Balkhi
- Firuz Mashreqi
- Hanzala Badghisi
- Basam Kurd
- Wasif Sagzi

== Germanic and Celtic Europe ==
=== Poets ===
- Likely period when Cynewulf flourishes in Mercia or Northumbria
- Bragi Boddason flourishes in the Swedish court in the first half of the century, author of Bragi inn gamli Boddason (Norwegian)
- Þjóðólfur úr Hvini (Norwegian)
- Þorbjörn hornklofi (Norwegian)
- Reign of King Alfred the Great, a noted poet in Anglo-Saxon, in Wessex from 871 to 899

=== Works ===
- 9th century:
  - Expansion of Gregorian chant, particularly in the Frankish lands of Europe
  - Cynewulf, The Fates of the Apostles, Juliana, Elene, and Christ II in Old English
  - Llywarch Hen in Welsh
  - Sequence of Saint Eulalia, earliest surviving poem in Old French
  - The Phoenix in Old English
  - Approximate period of Waldere in Old English
- c. 800
  - Pangur Bán in Old Irish
- 830s:
  - Lay of Hildebrand in Old High German
- 880s or 890s:
  - Ludwigslied and Georgslied in Old High German
- 890s:
  - Abbo Cernuus, De bellis Parisiacae urbis (The Wars of the City of Paris), in Latin

== Byzantine Empire and Slavic Europe ==
=== Events ===
- c. 855: Saints Cyril and Methodius develop the Glagolitic alphabet;Cyrillic is developed about the same time in Bulgaria. These alphabets permit translation of the Bible into Old Church Slavonic and other Slavic languages. First development of Slavic literary languages.
- Preslav Literary School (est. c. 885) and Ohrid Literary School (est. 886) flourish in Bulgaria.

=== Poets ===
- Constantine of Preslav in Bulgaria authors Азбучна молитва (Alphabet Prayer), the earliest surviving poetry in Old Church Slavonic.

== East Asia ==
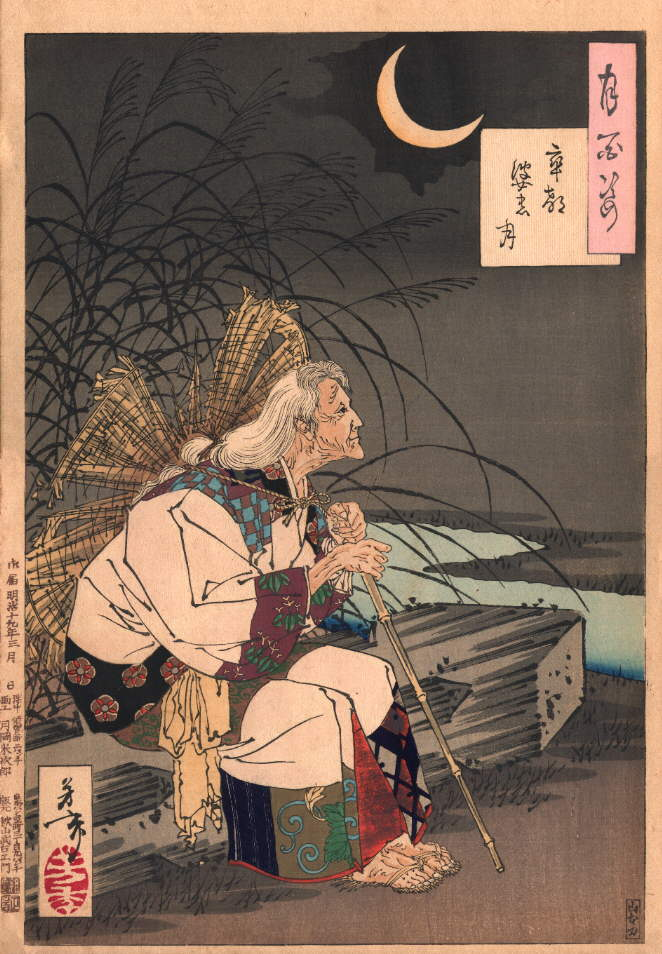
150

- The Han-shan poet and Feng-Kan, both part of the Tientai Trio, flourish in China.

=== China ===
- Pi Rixiu (834–883), Tang dynasty poet and magistrate

=== Korea ===
- Samdaemok (三代目/삼대목, 888), the earliest collection of hyangga poems; this anthology is no longer extant, but 14 pieces, the overwhelming majority of which are attributed to the 7th and 8th centuries, are preserved in the Samguk Yusa from the 13th century.

=== Japan ===
- Ariwara no Narihira 在原業平 (825–880), waka poet and nobleman; called one of the Six best Waka poets and one of the Thirty-six Poetry Immortals
- Fujiwara no Kanesuke 藤原兼輔, also 中納言兼輔 (877–933), middle Heian waka poet and nobleman; one of the Thirty-six Poetry Immortals; has a poem is in the anthology Hyakunin Isshu, others in several imperial poetry anthologies, including Kokin Wakashū and Gosen Wakashū
- Fujiwara no Sadakata 藤原定方, also known as "Sanjo Udaijin" 三条右大臣 (873–932), father of poet Asatada, cousin and father-in-law of Kanesuke; has a poem in Hyakunin Isshu anthology
- Ki no Tomonori 紀友則 (c. 850 – c. 904), early Heian period waka poet of the court, one of the Thirty-six Poetry Immortals; one of the four compilers of the Kokin Wakashū anthology
- Ki no Tsurayuki 紀貫之 (872–945) Heian period waka poet, government official and courtier; son of Ki no Mochiyuki; one of four compilers of the Kokin Wakashū anthology; provincial governor of Tosa province (930–935) and later possibly governor of Suo province
- Kisen 喜撰 also known as "Kisen Hōshi" 喜撰法師 (fl. early 9th century), early Heian period Buddhist monk and poet
- Kūkai 空海, also known posthumously as "Kōbō-Daishi" 弘法大師 (774–835), monk, scholar, poet, and artist who founded the Shingon or "True Word" school of Buddhism, followers of that school usually refer to him by the honorific title "Odaishisama" お大師様
- Lady Ise 伊勢 or Ise no miyasudokoro 伊勢の御息所 (c. 875 – c. 938), waka poet and noblewoman in the Imperial court; granddaughter of waka poet Ōnakatomi no Yoshinobu; born the Fujiwara no Tsugikage of Ise; lover of the Prince Atsuyoshi; a concubine to Emperor Uda; her son by him was Prince Yuki-Akari; has many poems in the Kokin Wakashū anthology
- Minamoto no Kintada 源公忠, also 源公忠朝臣 (889–948), middle Heian period waka poet and nobleman; one of the Thirty-six Poetry Immortals, along with his son Minamoto no Saneakira; an official in the imperial treasury; has poems in imperial poetry anthologies, starting with the Goshūi Wakashū
- Ōnakatomi no Yorimoto 大中臣頼基 (c. 886–958), middle Heian period waka poet and nobleman; one of the Thirty-six Poetry Immortals
- Ono no Komachi 小野 小町 or おののこまち (c. 825 – c. 900), early Heian period waka poet, one of the Rokkasen — the Six best Waka poets; one of the Thirty-six Poetry Immortals; noted as a rare beauty and became a symbol of a beautiful woman in Japan
- Ōshikōchi Mitsune 凡河内躬恒 (898–922), early Heian period administrator and waka poet of the court; one of the Thirty-six Poetry Immortals
- Sakanoue no Korenori 坂上是則 (fl. 9th century), early Heian waka poet; one of the Thirty-six Poetry Immortals; has a poem in the Hyakunin Isshu anthology
- Sarumaru no Taifu (fl. 9th century) 猿丸大夫, also known as "Sarumaru no Dayū", early Heian period waka poet; one of the Thirty Six Poetic Sages; no detailed histories or legends about him exist, and he may never have existed; some believe he was Prince Yamashiro no Ōe
- Semimaru 蝉丸, also known as "Semimaro" (fl. 9th century), early Heian period poet and musician; some accounts say he was a son of Uda Tennō, Prince Atsumi, or that he was the fourth son of Daigo Tennō; some claim he lived during the reign of Ninmyō Tennō
- The Six best Waka poets in Japan
- Sugawara no Michizane 菅原道真, also known as "Kan Shōjō" 菅丞相, (845–903), Heian Period scholar, poet and politician; grandson of Sugawara no Kiyotomo; also wrote Chinese poetry
- The Tales of Ise

== South Asia ==
=== Works ===
- Approximate date of the text of the Bhagavata Purana
- Asaga's Vardhaman Charitra (Life of Vardhaman), written in 853 CE, the first Sanskrit biography of Jain Tirthankara, Mahavir.

=== Poets ===
- Rajasekhara, in Sanskrit
- Asaga, in Sanskrit and Kannada

== Decades and years ==
790s	790	791	792	793	794	795	796	797	798	799
800s	800	801	802	803	804	805	806	807	808	809
810s	810	811	812	813	814	815	816	817	818	819
820s	820	821	822	823	824	825	826	827	828	829
830s	830	831	832	833	834	835	836	837	838	839
840s	840	841	842	843	844	845	846	847	848	849
850s	850	851	852	853	854	855	856	857	858	859
860s	860	861	862	863	864	865	866	867	868	869
870s	870	871	872	873	874	875	876	877	878	879
880s	880	881	882	883	884	885	886	887	888	889
890s	890	891	892	893	894	895	896	897	898	899
900s	900	901	902	903	904	905	906	907	908	909
