= List of Kokinshū poets =

This is a list of poets whose works were included in the Kokin Wakashū, a tenth-century Japanese waka anthology.

== List ==
=== A ===
- Ariwara no Motokata (Japanese: 在原元方)
- Ariwara no Muneyana (Japanese: 在原棟梁)
- Ariwara no Narihira (Japanese: 在原朝臣業平 Ariwara no Asomi Narihira)
- Ariwara no Shigeharu (Japanese: 在原滋春)
- Ariwara no Yukihira (Japanese: 在原朝臣行平 Ariwara no Asomi Yukihira)

=== F ===
- Fujiwara no Kotonao (Japanese: 藤原言直)
- Fujiwara no Okikaze (Japanese: 藤原興風)
- Fujiwara no Takaiko (Japanese: 藤原高子
- Fun'ya no Yasuhide (Japanese: 文屋康秀)
- Fujiwara no Yoruka (Japanese: 藤原朝臣因香 Fujiwara no Asomi Yoruka)
- Fujiwara no Yoshikaze (Japanese: 藤原好風)

=== H ===
- Henjō (Japanese: 僧正遍昭 Sōjō Henjō; birth name Yoshimine no Munesada Japanese: 良岑宗貞)

=== I ===
- Ise (Japanese: 伊勢)

=== K ===
- Ki no Aritomo (Japanese: 紀有友)
- Ki no Tomonori (Japanese: 紀朝臣友則 Ki no Asomi Tomonori)
- Ki no Tsurayuki (Japanese: 紀朝臣貫之 Ki no Asomi Tsurayuki)
- Kisen (Japanese: 喜撰法師 Kisen-hōshi)
- Emperor Kōkō (Japanese: 光孝院 Kōkō-in)
- Prince Koretaka (Japanese: 惟喬親王 Koretaka-no-miko)

=== M ===
- Mibu no Tadamine (Japanese: 壬生忠岑)
- Minamoto no Muneyuki (Japanese: 源朝臣宗于 Minamoto no Asomi Muneyuki)

=== N ===
- Emperor Nara (Japanese: 奈良帝 Nara-no-mikado)
- Empress Nijō (Japanese: 二条后 Nijō-no-kisaki; also known as Fujiwara no Takaiko Japanese: 藤原高子)

=== O ===
- Ono no Komachi (Japanese: 小野小町)
- Ōshikōchi no Mitsune (Japanese: 凡河内宿禰躬恒 Ōshikōchi no Sukune Mitsune)
- Ōtomo no Kuronushi (Japanese: 大友村主黒主 Ōtomo no Muranushi Kuronushi)

=== S ===
- Sōku (Japanese: 承均法師 Sōku-hōshi, also read Zōku-hōshi)
- Sosei (Japanese: 素性法師 Sosei-hōshi)
- Sugano no Takayo (Japanese: 菅野高世)

=== T ===
- Tachibana no Kiyoki (Japanese: 橘清樹)
- Tachibana no Kiyotomo (Japanese: 橘清友)
- Tachibana no Nakamori (Japanese: たちはなのなかもり)
