= 8th century in poetry =

== East Asia ==
=== Events ===
- Chinese poetry in the Tang dynasty develops into what is now considered to be of the characteristic style known as Tang poetry, highlighted by the work of Li Bai and Du Fu.
- Japanese poetry emerges, and the first imperial poetry anthologies are compiled
- 759
  - Japanese general Otomo no Yakamochi compiles the first Japanese poetry anthology, Man'yōshū, containing some 500 poems by Japanese poets who include the emperor, nobleman and commoners.
  - December 24 – Tang dynasty poet Du Fu departs for Chengdu, staying with his fellow poet Pei Di, where he composes poems about life in his thatched cottage.

=== Chinese Poets ===
- Wang Wei (701–761), Tang dynasty Chinese poet, musician, painter and statesman
- Li Bai (701–762), Chinese poet, one of the "Eight Immortals of the Wine Cup"
- Cui Hao (704–754), Chinese poet especially of women, frontier outposts, and natural scenery
- Qian Qi (710–782), Chinese poet
- Du Fu (712–770), Chinese poet especially of historical subjects
- Wei Yingwu (737–792), Chinese poet whose works are included in the Three Hundred Tang Poems
- Quan Deyu (759–818), chancellor of the Tang dynasty and poet
- Han Yu (768–824), a precursor of Neo-Confucianism as well as an essayist and poet
- Xue Tao (768–831), female Chinese poet
- Bai Juyi (772–846), Chinese poet of the Tang dynasty, writing poems themed around his responsibilities as a governor; renowned in Japan as well
- Liu Yuxi (772–842), Chinese poet, philosopher, and essayist
- Liu Zongyuan (773–819), Chinese writer and poet
- Jia Dao (779–843), Chinese poet of discursive gushi and lyric jintishi
- Yuan Zhen (779–831), Chinese writer and poet of the middle Tang dynasty known for his work Yingying's Biography
- Li He (790–816), Chinese poet of the late Tang dynasty, known for his unconventional and imaginative style
- Lu Tong (790–835), Chinese poet of the late Tang dynasty, known for his tea poems
- Niu Yingzhen, Chinese poet of the late Tang dynasty
- Zhang Xu, Chinese calligrapher and poet

=== Japanese Poets ===
- Abe no Nakamaro 阿倍仲麻呂 (c. 698 – c. 770), scholar, administrator, and waka poet in the Nara period (surname: Abe)
- Fujiwara no Hamanari 藤原 浜成 (724–790), poet and a nobleman of the Nara period; best known for Kakyō Hyōshiki, the oldest extant piece of Japanese poetic criticism, in which he attempts to apply phonetic rules of Chinese poetry to Japanese poetry; son of Fujiwara no Maro
- Fujiwara no Sadakata 藤原定方, also known as "Sanjo Udaijin" 三条右大臣 (873–932), father of poet Asatada, cousin and father-in-law of Kanesuke; has a poem in Hyakunin Isshu anthology
- Kakinomoto no Hitomaro 柿本 人麻呂 (c. 662–710), late Asuka period poet, nobleman and government official; the most prominent poet in the Man'yōshū anthology
- Lady Kasa 笠女郎 (fl. early 8th century) waka poet, a woman
- Kūkai 空海, also known posthumously as "Kōbō-Daishi" 弘法大師 (774–835), monk, scholar, poet, and artist who founded the Shingon or "True Word" school of Buddhism, followers of that school usually refer to him by the honorific title "Odaishisama" お大師様
- Empress Jitō 持統天皇 (645–703; 702 in the lunisolar calendar used in Japan until 1873), 41st imperial ruler, fourth empress and a poet
- Ōtomo no Sakanoe no Iratsume (c. 700–750), Japanese early Nara period female poet; member of the prestigious Ōtomo clan; has 79 poems in the Man'yōshū anthology (surname: Ōtomo)
- Ōtomo no Tabito 大伴旅人 (c. 662–731) poet best known as the father of Ōtomo no Yakamochi; both contributed to compiling the Man'yōshū anthology; member of the prestigious Ōtomo clan; served as governor-general of Dazaifu, the military procuracy in northern Kyūshū, from 728-730
- Ōtomo no Yakamochi 大伴家持 (c. 718–785), Nara period statesman and waka poet; one of the Thirty-six Poetry Immortals; member of the prestigious Ōtomo clan; son of Ōtomo no Tabito, older brother of Ōtomo no Kakimochi, nephew of Ōtomo no Sakanoe no Iratsume
- Sami Mansei 沙弥満誓 ("novice Mansei"), secular name was Kasa no Ason Maro (fl. c. 720), Buddhist priest and poet; a member of Ōtomo no Tabito's literary circle; has poems in the Man'yōshū anthology
- Yamabe no Akahito 山部赤人 or 山邊赤人 (700–736), Nara period poet with 13 chōka (long poems) and 37 tanka (short poems) in the Man'yōshū anthology; has been called the kami of poetry, and Waka Nisei along with Kakinomoto no Hitomaro; one of the Thirty-six Poetry Immortals
- Yamanoue no Okura 山上 憶良 (660–733), best known for his poems of children and commoners; has poems in the Man'yōshū anthology
- Ōtomo no Sakanoe no Iratsume (c. 700–750), early Nara period female poet; member of the prestigious Ōtomo clan; has 79 poems in the Man'yōshū anthology

=== Works ===
- 759? Man'yōshū, the first Japanese poetry anthology
- 772 – Kakyō Hyōshiki 歌経標式 (also known as Uta no Shiki ("The Code of Poetry"), a Japanese text on poetics commissioned by Emperor Kōnin and written by Fujiwara no Hamanari, is completed; the one-volume work "is the oldest extant piece of poetic criticism in the Japanese canon"

== Arabic world ==
=== Events ===
- Compilation of the Mufaddaliyat (prior to 784) and the Mu'allaqat, the major collections of pre-Islamic Arabic poetry.

=== Births of Arab poets ===
- Bashshar ibn Burd (714–784)
- Khalil ibn Ahmad (718–791)
- Al-Asma'i (740–828)
- Ibrahim Al-Mausili (742-804)
- Abu-l-'Atahiya (748–828)
- Abbas Ibn al-Ahnaf (750–809) (عباس بن الأحنف)
- Abu Nuwas (750–813)
- Dik al-Jinn (777–849)

=== Deaths of Arab poets ===
- 'Imran ibn Hittan, (died 703)
- Ibn Qays al-Ruqayyat (died 704)
- Layla al-Akhyaliyyah (died 704)
- Waddah al-Yaman (died 708)
- al-Akhtal (c. 640–710)
- Umar Ibn Abi Rabi'ah (died 712)
- Kuthayyir (ca. 660 – c. 723)
- Jarir ibn `Atiyah al-Khatfi (died c. 728)
- al-Farazdaq (died c. 729)
- Dhu al-Rummah (died 735)
- Al-Arji (died 738)
- Kumait Ibn Zaid (679–743)
- al-Walid ibn Yazid (died 744)
- Salih ibn 'Abd al-Quddus (d. 784)
- Bashshar ibn Burd (714–784)
- Khalil ibn Ahmad (718–791)

== Europe ==
=== Poets ===
- Maria Alphaizuli, referred to as the Arabian Sappho
- Angilbert (c. 760 - 814), Frankish ecclesiastic and poet, canonized
- Paulinus of Aquileia (c. 730/40 - 802) Italian ecclesiastic and poet
- Blathmac mac Con Brettan, Irish fili
- Niníne Éces, Irish (d. c. 700)

=== Works ===
- Likely period for the first composition of the poems that are ultimately compiled in the Beowulf manuscript
- Dream of the Rood, Old English, possible date
- Blathmac mac Con Brettan, Tan cucam a Mhuire and Oh Mhaire, a grain on cloine!
- Niníne Éces, Admuinemmar nóeb-Patraicc
- Paulinus of Aquileia, Carmen de regula fidei

== Byzantine Empire ==
=== Poets ===
- Saint Andrew of Crete (ca. 650 – July 4, 740)

== South Asia ==
=== Poets ===
- Bharavi, writing in Sanskrit
- Magha, writing in Sanskrit
- Saraha, writing in Old Hindi
