= 800s in poetry =

Nationality words link to articles with information on the nation's poetry or literature (for instance, Irish or France).

== Births ==
Death years link to the corresponding "[year] in poetry" article. There are conflicting or unreliable sources for the birth years of many people born in this period; where sources conflict, the poet is listed again and the conflict is noted:

800:

- King Amoghavarsha I, of the Rashtrakuta dynasty, (died 878), king and Kannada poet

802:

- Ono no Takamura (died 853), Heian period scholar and poet

803:

- Du Mu (died 852), Chinese poet of the late Tang dynasty

805:

- Abu Tammam (died 845), Arab poet and Muslim convert

806:

- Tung-Shan (died 869), Buddhist scholar and poet

808:

- Walafrid Strabo (died 849), Frankish monk, historian, poet and theological writer

== Deaths ==
Birth years link to the corresponding "[year] in poetry" article:

802:

- Saint Paulinus II (born between 730 and 740), Patriarch of Aquileia and a member of Charlemagne's court

804:

- May 19 - Alcuin (born 735), scholar, ecclesiastic, poet and teacher from York, Northumbria
- Lu Yu (born 733), the "Sage of Tea"
- Ibrahim Al-Mausili (born 742), Persian singer and poet

809:

- Abbas Ibn al-Ahnaf (born 750), Arab Abbasid poet

== See also ==
- Poetry
- 9th century in poetry
- 9th century in literature
- List of years in poetry

Other events:

- Other events of the 12th century
- Other events of the 13th century

9th century:

- 9th century in poetry
- 9th century in literature
