= 890s in poetry =

This article covers 890s in poetry. Nationality words link to articles with information on the nation's poetry or literature (for instance, Irish or France).

== Events ==
893:

- Mibu no Tadamine wins the Koresada no miko no ie no uta'awase (是貞の親王家歌合, "The Poetry Match at Prince Koresada's Residence")

== Births ==
Death years link to the corresponding "[year] in poetry" article. There are conflicting or unreliable sources for the birth years of many people born in this period; where sources conflict, the poet is listed again and the conflict is noted:

897:

- Abu al-Faraj al-Isfahani (died 967), Iranian scholar of Arab-Quraysh origin who is noted for collecting and preserving ancient Arabic lyrics and poems in his major work, the Kitāb al-Aghānī

898:

- Ōshikōchi Mitsune (died 922), one of the Thirty-six Poetry Immortals of Heian Japan

== Deaths ==
Birth years link to the corresponding "[year] in poetry" article:

890:

- Feb. 12: Henjo (born 816), one of the Six best Waka poets and Thirty-six Poetry Immortals

893:

- Ariwara no Yukihira (born 818), Japanese Heian period courtier, poet and bureaucrat

896:

- Flann mac Lonáin (born unknown), Irish Gaelic poet

897:

- al-Buhturi (born 820), Arabian poet

899:

- Oct. 26: Alfred the Great (born 849), King and poet, wrote Lays of Boethius

== See also ==
- Poetry
- 9th century in poetry
- 9th century in literature
- List of years in poetry

Other events:

- Other events of the 12th century
- Other events of the 13th century

9th century:

- 9th century in poetry
- 9th century in literature
