= 810s in poetry =

Nationality words link to articles with information on the nation's poetry or literature (for instance, Irish or France).

== Works published ==
814:

- Text of the Wessobrunn Prayer in Old High German

== Births ==
Death years link to the corresponding "[year] in poetry" article. There are conflicting or unreliable sources for the birth years of many people born in this period; where sources conflict, the poet is listed again and the conflict is noted:

813:

- Li Shangyin (died 858), Chinese poet of the late Tang dynasty

815:

- Johannes Scotus Eriugena (died 877), among the last Hiberno-Latin poets

816:

- Henjo (died 890), one of the Six best Waka poets and Thirty-six Poetry Immortals
- Sosei (died 910), one of the Thirty-six Poetry Immortals

818:

- Ariwara no Yukihira (died 893), Japanese Heian period courtier, poet and bureaucrat

== Deaths ==
Birth years link to the corresponding "[year] in poetry" article:

810:

- Abu Nuwas (born 756), classical Arabic and Persian poet^{a}

814:

- February 18 - Angilbert (born c. 760), Frankish ecclesiastic and poet, canonized

816:

- Li He (born 790), Chinese poet of the late Tang dynasty

819:

- Liu Zongyuan (born 773), Chinese writer, poet and politician

== See also ==
- Poetry
- 9th century in poetry
- 9th century in literature
- List of years in poetry

Other events:

- Other events of the 12th century
- Other events of the 13th century

9th century:

- 9th century in poetry
- 9th century in literature

== Notes ==
- Straley, Dona S. (2004). The undergraduate's companion to Arab writers and their web sites. Libraries Unlimited. pp. 30. ISBN 1-59158-118-4. ISBN 978-1-59158-118-5.
