= Dik al-Jinn =

Abbasid-era Arabic poet from Homs

- ديك الجن عبد السلام بن رغبان الكلبي الحمصي
- Born: 777; Homs, Abbasid Caliphate
- Died: 849; Homs, Abbasid Caliphate
- Occupation: Poet
- Spouse: Ward
- Writing career
- Notable work: Diwan Dik al-Jinn

Abd Al-Salam Ibn Raghbân al-Kalbi al-Himsî (Arabic: عبد السلام بن رغبان الكلبي الحمصي; 777–849), known as Dik al-Jinn (Arabic: ديك الجن), is an Arabic poet during the Abbasid Caliphate, who is famous for his love for a Christian woman named "Ward", and the fact that he never left his native city, Homs. He was a Shia Muslim.

== Biography ==
Abd al-Salam was born in 777 or 778 CE (161 AH) in Homs. His family originally came from Salamiyah or Mu'tah. He was a mawlā (client) of either Banu Kalb or Tayyi', as his ancestor Tamim had converted to Islam at the hands of the Arab commander Habib ibn Maslama. He never left Syria during his lifetime and did not travel to Iraq or compose panegyrics for caliphs and rulers to earn a living.

Several explanations exist for his nickname "Dik al-Jinn" (Cock of the Jinn):

- He had green eyes, or dyed his eyebrows green with verdigris and his beard with henna.
- He composed a funeral elegy (Rithā') for a rooster served at a banquet.
- He frequented the gardens of Homs, causing people to liken him to a small insect or bird of that name found in orchards.

He was a Shia Muslim known for his devotion to the Ahl al-Bayt and his elegies commemorating the killing of Husayn ibn Ali at Karbala. In his personal life, he was known for debauchery, drinking wine, and squandering the fortune he inherited from his father on pleasure and singing gatherings.

Dik al-Jinn fell in love with a Christian woman from Homs named Ward (also referred to in some sources as Na'm or Dunya), who converted to Islam and married him. Disapproving of his lifestyle and marriage, his cousin Abu al-Tayyib spread a rumor that she was having an affair with one of the poet's attendants. Driven by jealousy after being misled by his family's plot, Dik al-Jinn killed her with his sword. After discovering her innocence, he spent the rest of his life grieving and composing elegies for her.

He was considered a prominent figure of the Syrian school of poetry and one of the masters of the poet Abu Tammam, who met him in Homs and received a scroll of his poetry. He died in Homs during the reign of Caliph al-Mutawakkil in 849 or 850 CE (235 or 236 AH), in his seventies.

== Poetry ==
Dik al-Jinn belonged to the Syrian school of Abbasid poetry and heavily utilized badīʿ (rhetorical figures), a style later popularized by his student Abu Tammam. Rather than relying on the traditional ṭawīl meter, he composed most of his surviving verses in the kāmil, khafīf, and basīṭ meters.

Because his original dīwān was lost over time, most of his surviving poetry consists of short pieces and fragments preserved in classical anthologies. His verse primarily covers the following genres:

- Elegy (Rithā'): His most famous poems are the elegies expressing his grief and remorse over the killing of his wife Ward, as well as his Shia lamentations for Husayn ibn Ali and the Ahl al-Bayt.
- Wine poetry (khamriyyāt) and love poetry (ghazal): Much of his collection is dedicated to the description of wine, singing gatherings, and amorous verses addressed to both women and youths.
- Satire (hijāʾ) and panegyric (madīḥ): He composed invectives against his cousin Abu al-Tayyib for instigating the murder of Ward. Although he generally avoided court poetry, he left a few panegyrics addressed to members of the Hashimite family and local notables in Homs.

In the modern era, his surviving poems were first collected and compiled into a dīwān by Sheikh Muhammad al-Samawi, followed by several later critical editions.
