= Sadakazu =

- Gender: Male

Origin
- Origin: Japanese
- Meaning: Different meanings depending on the kanji used

Sadakazu (written: 禎一, 貞一 or 貞和) is a masculine Japanese given name. Notable people with the name include:

- Sadakazu Fujii (藤井 貞和; born 1942), Japanese poet and scholar of Japanese literature
- Sadakazu Tanigaki (谷垣 禎一; born 1945), Japanese politician
- Sadakazu Uyenishi (上西 貞一; 1880–?), Japanese jujutsuka
