= 820s in poetry =

Nationality words link to articles with information on the nation's poetry or literature (for instance, Irish or France).

== Events ==
825:

- Approximate date of completion of the Heliand

== Births ==
Death years link to the corresponding "[year] in poetry" article. There are conflicting or unreliable sources for the birth years of many people born in this period; where sources conflict, the poet is listed again and the conflict is noted:

820:

- al-Buhturi (died 897), Arabian poet

821:

- al-Buhturi (died 897), Arabian poet

825:

- Ariwara no Narihira (died 880), one of the Six best Waka poets
- Ono no Komachi (died 900), an early woman poet and also one of the Six best Waka poets

== Deaths ==
Birth years link to the corresponding "[year] in poetry" article:

821:

- December 18 - Theodulf of Orléans (born between 750 and 760), in Angers

824:

- Han Yu (born 768), Chinese essayist and poet

826:

- Theodore the Studite (born 759), Byzantine monk and abbot

828:

- Abu al-Alahijah (born unknown), Islamic poet famous for writing homilies
- Abu-l-'Atahiya (born 748), Arab poet
- Al-Asma'i (born 740), Arab scholar and poet

== See also ==
- Poetry
- 9th century in poetry
- 9th century in literature
- List of years in poetry

Other events:

- Other events of the 12th century
- Other events of the 13th century

9th century:

- 9th century in poetry
- 9th century in literature
