= Fujiwara no Masatada =

Fujiwara no Masatada (藤原 雅正; died 961) was a Japanese poet. He was the first son of Fujiwara no Kanesuke, among the Thirty-six Poetry Immortals and the grandfather of Murasaki Shikibu. Kiyotada was his younger brother. He married a daughter of Fujiwara no Sadakata; their children include Tameyori and Tametoki, the father of Murasaki. He was also acquainted with Ki no Tsurayuki.
