= Sosei =

Japanese poet

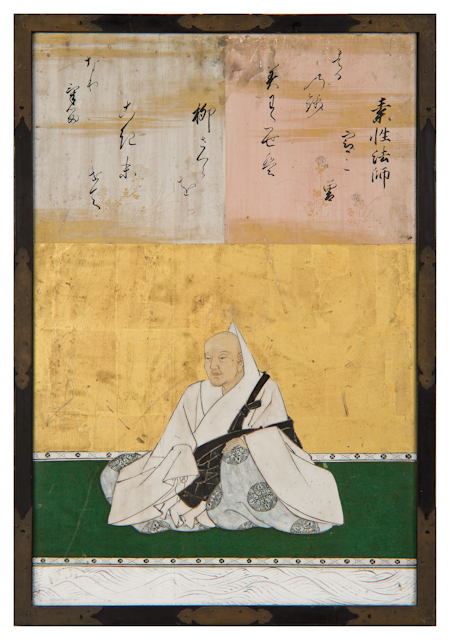
Sosei Hōshi by Kanō Tan'yū, 1648

Sosei (Japanese: 素性 or 素性法師, c. 844 – 910) was a Japanese waka poet and Buddhist priest. He is listed as one of the Thirty-six Poetry Immortals, and one of his poems was included in the famous anthology Hyakunin Isshu. His father Henjō was also a waka poet and monk.

Sosei entered religious life sometime after his father, who took the tonsure after the death of Emperor Ninmyō in 850.

His father is said to have pushed him into joining religion, and we can find a total of 36 poems by him in the Kokin Wakashū.

== Waka Poems ==
Sokoi-naki fuchi-yawa-sawagu yamagawa-no asaki-seni-koso adanami-wa-tate (Kokin waka shu)

Translation: The deep pools do not have waves, but the shallow rapids of mountain rivers often have waves.

Interpretation of love: My deep love for you is unmoved. It is frivolous love that causes rumors.

Interpretation of a life lesson: The fine man is quiet, but the petty man is noisy.
