= Fujiwara no Kiyotada =

Japanese poet

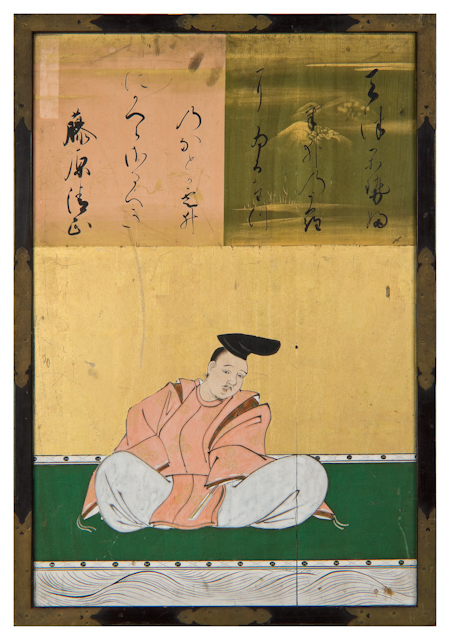
- Fujiwara no Kiyotada by Kanō Naonobu, 1648
- Born: Unknown
- Died: July 958
- Occupation: Poet
- Relatives: Fujiwara no Kanesuke (father); Fujiwara no Masatada (brother)
- Writing career
- Period: mid-Heian

Fujiwara no Kiyotada (藤原 清正; died July 958) was a Japanese poet, in particular one of the Thirty-six Poetry Immortals. He was the second son of Fujiwara no Kanesuke, also one of the Thirty-six Poetry Immortals. Though his mother's name was not recorded, the Gosen Wakashū, an anthology of Japanese poems, mentions the name "Mother of Kiyotada" (清正母). His elder brother was Masatada.
