= 870s in poetry =

This article covers 870s in poetry. Nationality words link to articles with information on the nation's poetry or literature (for instance, Irish or France).

== Events ==
870:

- Approximate date of completion of the Muspilli
- Approximate date of the Kakawin Rāmâyaṇa

== Births ==
Death years link to the corresponding "[year] in poetry" article. There are conflicting or unreliable sources for the birth years of many people born in this period; where sources conflict, the poet is listed again and the conflict is noted:

872:

- Ki no Tsurayuki (died 945), Japanese waka poet

873:

- Fujiwara no Sadakata (died 932), Japanese poet

875:

- Lady Ise (died 938), a prominent woman waka poet

877:

- Fujiwara no Kanesuke (died 933), one of the Thirty-six Poetry Immortals of Japan

== Deaths ==
Birth years link to the corresponding "[year] in poetry" article:

870:

- Wen Tingyun (born 812), Chinese lyricist of the late Tang dynasty who helped establish the Ci in chinese poetry

877:

- Johannes Scotus Eriugena (born 815), among the last Hiberno-Latin poets

878:

- King Amoghavarsha I, of the Rashtrakuta dynasty, (born 800), king and Kannada poet

== See also ==
- Poetry
- 9th century in poetry
- 9th century in literature
- List of years in poetry

Other events:

- Other events of the 12th century
- Other events of the 13th century

9th century:

- 9th century in poetry
- 9th century in literature
