= 940s in poetry =

This article covers 940s in poetry. Nationality words link to articles with information on the nation's poetry or literature (for instance, Irish or France).

== Works published ==
941:

- Adipurana by Adikavi Pampa

945:

- Publication of Ten Styles of Tadamine by Mibu no Tadamine (approximate date)

== Births ==
Death years link to the corresponding "[year] in poetry" article. There are conflicting or unreliable sources for the birth years of many people born in this period; where sources conflict, the poet is listed again and the conflict is noted:

940:

- Ferdowsi (died 1020), Persian poet, author of Shahnameh

949:

- Fujiwara no Nagayoshi (died unknown), Japanese poet and a court bureaucrat of the Heian period
- Ranna (died unknown), writing in Kannada language (approx.)

== Deaths ==
Birth years link to the corresponding "[year] in poetry" article:

941:

- Rudaki (born 858), Persian poet in the Perso-Arabic alphabet or "New Persian" script

943:

- Fujiwara no Atsutada, 藤原敦忠, also 権中納言敦忠; also known as 本院中納言 ("Hon'in Chunagon") and 琵琶中納言 ("Biwa Chunagon"), (born 906), middle Heian period waka poet and nobleman; one of the Thirty-six Poetry Immortals; one of his poems is included in the Hyakunin Isshu anthology

945:

- Ki no Tsurayuki (born 872), Japanese author, poet and courtier of the Heian period (approximate date)

948:

- Minamoto no Kintada (born 889), one of the Thirty-six Poetry Immortals of Japan

== See also ==
- Poetry
- 10th century in poetry
- 10th century in literature
- List of years in poetry

Other events:

- Other events of the 12th century
- Other events of the 13th century

10th century:

- 10th century in poetry
- 10th century in literature
