= 860s in poetry =

This article covers 860s in poetry. Nationality words link to articles with information on the nation's poetry or literature (for instance, Irish or France).

== Births ==
Death years link to the corresponding "[year] in poetry" article. There are conflicting or unreliable sources for the birth years of many people born in this period; where sources conflict, the poet is listed again and the conflict is noted:

861:
Abdullah ibn al-Mu'tazz (died 908) Abbasid caliph and poet

== Deaths ==
Birth years link to the corresponding "[year] in poetry" article:

869:

- Tung-Shan (born 806), Buddhist scholar and poet

== See also ==
- Poetry
- 9th century in poetry
- 9th century in literature
- List of years in poetry

Other events:

- Other events of the 12th century
- Other events of the 13th century

9th century:

- 9th century in poetry
- 9th century in literature
