= Shirome =

Japanese poet

Shirome (白女) was a Heian-era Japanese waka poet and asobi, or female entertainer. Her name was almost certainly a moniker used by multiple asobi, and follows the trend of suffixing -me (女) to mean "girl" (Shirome means "white girl"). (Note: Ōe no Masafusa's Yūjoki mentions an asobi named Shirome in the port city of Eguchi, and there is no reason to believe she is the same figure as the poet.)

Shirome was the daughter of Ōe no Tamabuchi (摂津国玉淵), governor of Tango Province and himself a waka poet. Her aristocratic background was rare but not unique among asobi. Her encounter with Emperor Uda, recorded in both the Ōkagami and Yamato Monogatari, illuminates this tension. The retired emperor notices Shirome's beauty while relaxing at Torikai (鳥飼), and hearing Tamabuchi is her father challenges her to prove it by composing a poem on the theme of Torikai. She promptly recites a poem punning on Torikai and alluding to the emperor as spring, whereupon the court showers her with praise and gifts. (Note: "Though not a mist/I have ascended/in this season/when we greet the spring/with its fruitful green." In transliterated Japanese, one can see how "Torikai" is hidden at the end of the first line and beginning of the second: Fukamidori/kai aru haru ni/au toki wa/kasumi naranedo/tachinoborikeri. In Japanese characters, it is: あさみどり かひある春に あひぬれば霞ならねど たちのぼりけり.)

The Kokin Wakashū includes one of her poems:

If life were to last
however long we saw fit
would we be likely
to suffer such deep distress
just because of a parting?

Shirome is the only asobi identifiable in the Kokin Wakashū, though many asobi composed poetry to entertain large groups.
