= Ōtomo no Kuronushi =

Japanese poet

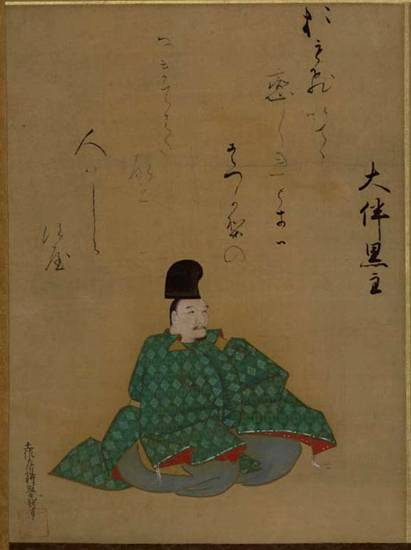
Ōtomo no Kuronushi by Tosa Mitsuoki

Ōtomo no Kuronushi (大友 黒主) was a Japanese poet, one of the Rokkasen, the "Six Poetic Geniuses" described in the Kokin Wakashū, a classical poetic anthology. His family was the Ōtomo clan, an ancient immigrant clan that was active during the Kofun period.

He is one of the six poets laureate. His poems suggest strong influence from his close ties with the lands of Ōmi and Shiga. According to the "Mumyosho", collected articles on poetics authored by Kamo-no-Chomei, Kuronushi ascended to the status of a god and was enshrined as a "Myojin" god in the Shiga Province of Ōmi. In one account, he is the same person as Otomo-no-Suguri-Kuronushi who was mentioned in the ministerial bulletin of 866 (Jogan 8). Ōtomo-no-Suguri is a clan seated at Ōtomo Village in the Shiga Province of the Ōmi Domain.
