= Sarumaru Dayū =

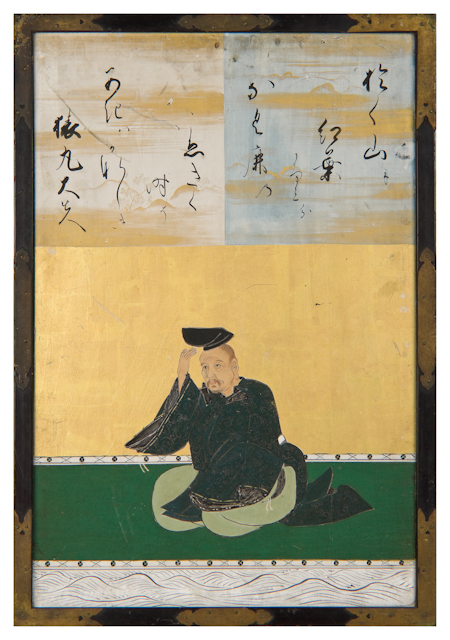
Sarumaru no Taifu by Kanō Tan'yū, 1648

Sarumaru no Taifu, also known as Sarumaru no Dayū (猿丸大夫) was a waka poet in the early Heian period. He is a member of the Thirty Six Poetic Sages (三十六歌仙, Sanjūrokkasen), but there are no detailed histories or legends about him. There is a possibility that there never was such a person. Some believe him to have been Prince Yamashiro no Ōe.

== Poetry example ==
The following waka is attributed to him, a classic autumn poem (秋歌, aki no uta):

Japanese
Rōmaji
English translation

奥山に
紅葉踏みわけ
鳴く鹿の
声きく時ぞ
秋はかなしき

Okuyama ni
Momiji fumiwake
Naku shika no
Koe kiku toki zo
Aki wa kanashiki

Autumn at its saddest—
Rustling through the leaves
and moving on alone
deep into the mountains,
I hear a lonely stag belling for his doe.

This poem is the 215th poem of the Kokin Wakashū, and was also incorporated into Fujiwara no Teika's famous Ogura Hyakunin Isshu, as number 5.

== Sources ==
- McMillan, Peter (2008). One Hundred Poets, One Poem Each: A Translation of the Ogura Hyakunin Isshu. Foreword by Donald Keene. Columbia University Press. ISBN 978-0-231-14398-1.
