= Maria Alphaizuli =

11th-century poet

- مريم بنت أبي يعقوب الشَّلْبي
- Born: Shilb (modern Silves, Portugal)
- Occupations: Poet, Tutor
- Writing career
- Language: Arabic

Mariam bint Abu Ya'qub Ashshilbi (Arabic: مريم بنت أبي يعقوب الشَّلْبي) was an 8th-century Arabic-language poet of al-Andalus. She was born in Shilb (modern Silves, Portugal) and settled in Seville, where she became a tutor of noblewomen.

During her time, many women of the Andalusian area cultivated the arts. Some well-preserved examples of her work survive in the library of the Escorial.
