= 830s in poetry =

This article covers 830s in poetry. Nationality words link to articles with information on the nation's poetry or literature (for instance, Irish or France).

== Births ==
Death years link to the corresponding "[year] in poetry" article. There are conflicting or unreliable sources for the birth years of many people born in this period; where sources conflict, the poet is listed again and the conflict is noted:

833:

- Luo Yin (died 909), Chinese poet

834:

- Pi Rixiu (died 883), Tang dynasty poet and magistrate (approximate date)

836:

- Wei Zhuang (died 910), Chinese poet and Tang period historical figure, is best known for his poetry in shi and ci styles

837:

- Ibn Duraid (died 934), Arab poet and philologist

== Deaths ==
Birth years link to the corresponding "[year] in poetry" article:

831:

- Yuan Zhen (born 779), Chinese writer and poet in the middle Tang dynasty known for his work Yingying's Biography

835:

- Kūkai (born 774), Japanese kanshi poet
- Lu Tong (born 790), Chinese poet

== See also ==
- Poetry
- 9th century in poetry
- 9th century in literature
- List of years in poetry

Other events:

- Other events of the 12th century
- Other events of the 13th century

9th century:

- 9th century in poetry
- 9th century in literature
