= Semimaru =

Japanese poet

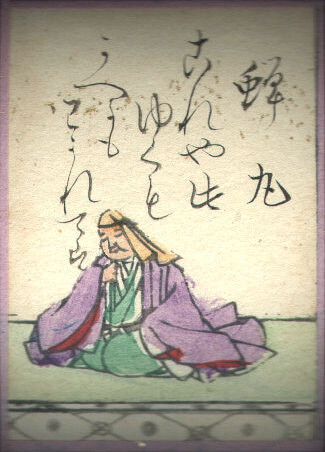
Semimaru, from the Hyakunin Isshu.

Semimaru also known as Semimaro (蝉丸) was a Japanese poet and musician of the early Heian period. His name is recorded in the Ogura Hyakunin Isshu, but there are no historical accounts of his pedigree. Some accounts say he was a son of Uda Tennō, Prince Atsumi, or that he was the fourth son of Daigo Tennō. There are also claims that he lived during the reign of Ninmyō Tennō.

Semimaru was a blind lute player who lived alone in a straw hut in Ausaka, which means "meeting slope". "Ausaka is a slope about five miles east of the center of modern Kyoto. Its apex is a narrow pass through the eastern range of mountains separating Kyoto from the area of Lake Biwa." The emperor established a formal check point barrier, Ausaka no seki, at this summit in 646. Today the place is known as Osaka. A Shinto shrine was built there by the tenth century and eventually became known as Semimaru jinja.

Supposedly, on seeing the traffic on the road to the capital, he composed the following waka (和歌)

これやこの行くも帰るも別れては
知るも知らぬも逢坂の関
Kore ya kono yuku mo kaeru mo wakaretewa shiru mo shiranu mo osaka no seki
So this is the place! The crowds, coming, going, meeting, parting; friends, strangers, known, unknown - The Osaka (Ausaka) Barrier (逢坂の関, ausaka no seki).
(Ogura Hyakunin Isshu 10)

The above waka appears in the imperial anthology Gosen Wakashū. Other Semimaru poems appear in the anthologies Shin Kokin Wakashū, Kokin Wakashū and Shokukokin Wakashū. For this poem, he became known as Seki no Akagami (関の明神).

According to the Konjaku Monogatarishū (Book 24, tale 23), for three years Minamoto no Hiromasa travelled from the capital regularly, hoping to hear and meet Semimaru. Finally, they met and Semimaru tutored him in playing the biwa (琵琶) melodies Ryūsen (流泉) and Takuboku (啄木).

== Legacy ==
In nō there is a Zeami Motokiyo play, Semimaru, that depicts the life of a "young man, blind from birth...abandoned on a mountainside by his father", and his sister, Sakagami (逆髪), "a beautiful young woman" that "suffers episodes of inexplicable madness which compel her to wander the countryside aimlessly."

Chikamatsu Monzaemon wrote the Joruri Semimaru.

=== Landmarks ===
- Semimaru Shrine at the Gate (関蝉丸神社, Seki no Semimaru Jinja) in Ōsaka Mountain (逢坂山, ōsakazan), Ōtsu, Shiga Prefecture.
- A stone grave bearing the name of Semimaru in Miyazaki Village, Fukui Prefecture.
