= Fujiwara no Okikaze =

Japanese nobleman and poet

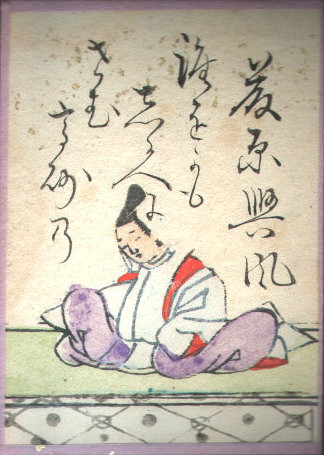
Fujiwara no Okikaze, from the Ogura Hyakunin Isshu.

Fujiwara no Okikaze (藤原 興風; dates unknown) was an early 10th Century middle Heian waka poet and Japanese nobleman. He was a great-grandchild of Fujiwara no Hamanari. He is designated as a member of the Thirty-six Poetry Immortals. 38 of his poems are included in the anthologies compiled by the imperial order following Kokin Wakashū. One of his poems is included in the famous anthology Hyakunin Isshu.

Okikaze's poems are included in several imperial poetry anthologies, including Kokin Wakashū. A personal poetry collection known as the Okikazeshū also remains.

It is said he was talented in kangen (gagaku piece without dance).

He was conferred shō roku-i no jō (正六位上, Senior Sixth Rank, Upper Grade), of Japanese court rank.
