= Niníne Éces =

Irish poet

Niníne Éces (fl. 700) was an Irish poet, thought to be a member of the Uí Echdach, a kindred known for learning, who were located in the south and west of what is now County Armagh. They are recorded as producing several high-ranking ecclesiastics.

Niníne's surviving compositions include Admuinemmar nóeb-Patraicc. This poem, addressed to St. Patrick, was the basis for Dóchas Linn Naomh Pádraig by Tomás Ó Flannghaile (1846–1915).

== Sources ==
- Oxford Concise Companion to Irish Literature, Robert Welsh, 1996. ISBN 0-19-280080-9
