= 900s in poetry =

This article covers 900s in poetry. Nationality words link to articles with information on the nation's poetry or literature (for instance, Irish or France).

== Events ==
905:

- Presentation of the Kokin Wakashū (approximate date).

== Births ==
Death years link to the corresponding "[year] in poetry" article. There are conflicting or unreliable sources for the birth years of many people born in this period; where sources conflict, the poet is listed again and the conflict is noted:

902:

- Adikavi Pampa (died 975), writing in the Kannada language

908:

- Kiyohara no Motosuke (died 990), one of the Thirty-six Poetry Immortals of Japan

== Deaths ==
Birth years link to the corresponding "[year] in poetry" article:

900:

- Ono no Komachi (born 825), an early woman poet and one of the Six best Waka poets

903:

- March 26: Sugawara no Michizane (born 845), Japanese kanshi poet

904:

- Ki no Tomonori (born 850), Heian waka poet of the court, a member of the sanjūrokkasen or Thirty-six Poetry Immortals (approximate date)

908:

- Abdullah ibn al-Mu'tazz (born 861), Arabic poet

909:

- Luo Yin (born 833), Chinese poet

== See also ==
- Poetry
- 10th century in poetry
- 10th century in literature
- List of years in poetry

Other events:

- Other events of the 12th century
- Other events of the 13th century

10th century:

- 10th century in poetry
- 10th century in literature
