= 850s in poetry =

This article covers 850s in poetry. Nationality words link to articles with information on the nation's poetry or literature (for instance, Irish or France).

== Works published ==
850:

- Kavirajamarga, the first poetry book in the Kannada language, by King Nripatunga Amoghavarsha I

853:

- Vardhaman Charitra (Life of Vardhaman) by Asaga, the first Sanskrit biography of Jain Tirthankara, Mahavir.

== Births ==
Death years link to the corresponding "[year] in poetry" article. There are conflicting or unreliable sources for the birth years of many people born in this period; where sources conflict, the poet is listed again and the conflict is noted:

850:

- Ki no Tomonori (died 904), Japanese waka poet

857:

- Ch'oe Ch'i-wŏn, (died unknown), in Silla (Korea)

858:

- Mansur Al-Hallaj (died 922), Persian poet, mystic, revolutionary writer and pious teacher of Sufism, most famous for his apparent, but disputed, self-proclaimed divinity (approximate date)

859:

- Rudaki (died 941), Persian poet (approximate date)

== Deaths ==
Birth years link to the corresponding "[year] in poetry" article:

850:

- Shih-Te (born unknown), Chinese monk and poet

852:

- Du Mu (born 803), Chinese poet of the late Tang dynasty

853:

- Ono no Takamura (born 802), Heian period scholar and poet

858:

- Li Shangyin (born 813), Chinese poet of the late Tang dynasty

== See also ==
- Poetry
- 9th century in poetry
- 9th century in literature
- List of years in poetry

Other events:

- Other events of the 12th century
- Other events of the 13th century

9th century:

- 9th century in poetry
- 9th century in literature
