= 880s in poetry =

Nationality words link to articles with information on the nation's poetry or literature (for instance, Irish or France).

== Events ==
885:

- Approximate date of establishment of Preslav Literary School in Bulgaria

886:

- Establishment of Ohrid Literary School in Bulgaria.

== Works published ==
880:

- Approximate date of the Sequence of Saint Eulalia
- Approximate date of the Ballad of the Lady Ch'in, about the Huang-ch’ao Rebellion, by Wei Zhuang

== Births ==
Death years link to the corresponding "[year] in poetry" article. There are conflicting or unreliable sources for the birth years of many people born in this period; where sources conflict, the poet is listed again and the conflict is noted:

886:

- Ōnakatomi no Yorimoto (died 958), one of the Thirty-six Poetry Immortals of Japan

889:

- Minamoto no Kintada, one of the Thirty-six Poetry Immortals of Japan

== Deaths ==
Birth years link to the corresponding "[year] in poetry" article:

880:

- Ariwara no Narihira ^{Viewers must translate page} (born 825), one of the Six best Waka poets

881:

- Lu Guimeng (born unknown), Chinese poet

883:

- Pi Rixiu (born 834), Tang dynasty poet and magistrate

== See also ==
- Poetry
- 9th century in poetry
- 9th century in literature
- List of years in poetry

Other events:

- Other events of the 12th century
- Other events of the 13th century

9th century:

- 9th century in poetry
- 9th century in literature
