= Kakyō Hyōshiki =

Kakyō Hyōshiki (歌経標式) is a text on Japanese poetics written by Fujiwara no Hamanari. One volume in length, it "is the oldest extant piece of poetic criticism in the Japanese canon".

== Development ==
The text was commissioned by Emperor Kōnin and completed in 772.

== Title ==
The common title today is Kakyō Hyōshiki and is in reference to Chinese Book of Songs (Japanese Shikyō). However, chronologically the name does not fit, and some manuscripts do not include this title at all. Alternative titles include Uta no Shiki (歌式), which is likely to have been the original title, as well as Hamanari Shiki (浜成式) based on the compiler's name.

== Contents ==
The main focus of the text is an attempt to apply phonetic rules of Chinese poetry to Japanese poetry. As the two languages are fundamentally different, the application is forced and unnatural.

The text defines seven types of kahei (歌病), literally "poetic sicknesses" which are rhetoric faults that should be avoided when composing poetry.

- tōbi (頭尾): the last character of the first and last verses are the same
- kyōbi (胸尾): the last character of the first verse is the same as the third or sixth character of the second verse
- yōbi (腰尾): the last character of the other verses is homophonous with the last character of the third verse
- enshi (黶子): the last character of the third verse is used in the other verses
- yūfū (遊風): the second and final syllables in a single verse are the same
- dōseiin (同声韻): the final character of the third and fifth verses are the same
- henshin (偏身): with the exception of the final syllable of the third verse, when two or more homophones are used consecutively

The text also defines three types of poetic forms:

- kyūin (求韻): chōka and tanka
- satai (査体): irregular
- zattei (雑体): mixed

Hamanari quotes 34 poems to illustrate the above points. Many of these poems are not found in poetry collections of the time such as Man'yōshū. These poems are quite valuable to historical linguists as they are written in Man'yōgana, a script which preserves a historical phonological distinction known as Jōdai Tokushu Kanazukai that was soon lost afterwards.

== See also ==
- 8th century in poetry
