= Sadakazu Fujii =

Japanese writer (born 1942)

Sadakazu Fujii (藤井 貞和, Fujii Sadakazu; born 27 April 1942, Tokyo) is a Japanese poet and scholar of Japanese literature, which includes the genres of ancient novels, the Man'yōshū, oral literature, Okinawan culture, Ainu language, and contemporary poetry. He is well known for his study on the Genji Monogatari. His poems and palindromes have been used in the musical compositions of Takahashi Yuji.

== Publications ==
- The New Poetry of Japan—The 70s and 80s. Eds. Thomas Fitzsimmons and Yoshimasu Gozo. Katydid Books. 1993. 186 pp. Paper, ISBN 0-942668-36-7. [The book contains the works of five Japanese poets from the '70s and '80s, including Fujii Sadakazu, Hirata Toshiko, Matsuura Hisaki, Yoshida Tuminori, and Inagawa Masato.]
- The Relationship Between the Romance, and Religious Observances: Genji Monogatari as Myth. Fujii Sadakazu. Japanese journal of Religious Studies 912-3 June–September 1982 PDF file
- Monogatari riron kogi [Lectures on the Theory of Narrative], By Fujii Sadakazu, Tokyo Daigaku Shuppankai, 2004. 212, 150 mm. 224 pp. ISBN 4-13-083038-4.
- Monogatari bungaku seiritsushi (History of the Rise of Monogatari Literature). Fujii, Sadakazu. Tokyo: Tokyo UP, 1987.
