= Sakanoue no Korenori =

Japanese poet

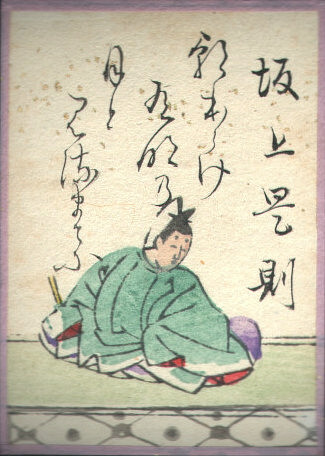
Sakanoue no Korenori, from the Ogura Hyakunin Isshu

Sakanoue no Korenori (坂上是則) was a Japanese waka poet of the early Heian period. His exact dates of birth and death are unknown, but he was a fourth-generation descendant of Sakanoue no Tamuramaro.

He was one of the Thirty-six Immortals of Poetry and one of his poems was included in the Ogura Hyakunin Isshu. Forty-one of his poems were ultimately included in the imperial anthologies.

He was the father of the poet Mochiki (望城; d. 975).

During his own life he was known primarily as a champion kemari player. On March 2, 905, he and his colleagues kicked a ball 206 times without interruption at the Imperial Court, and were praised by the emperor.

He served as governor of Kaga Province.

== Poetry ==
One of his poems was included as No. 31 in Fujiwara no Teika's Ogura Hyakunin Isshu:

Japanese text	Romanized Japanese	English translation
朝ぼらけ 有明の月と みるまでに 吉野の里に ふれる白雪	Asaborake ariake no tsuki to miru made ni yoshino no sato ni fureru shira-yuki	The first light over Yoshino village— The snow has piled so deep, so white I cannot tell it from the dawn's pale moonlight

== Bibliography ==
- Keene, Donald (1999). A History of Japanese Literature, Vol. 1: Seeds in the Heart — Japanese Literature from Earliest Times to the Late Sixteenth Century. New York: Columbia University Press. ISBN 978-0-231-11441-7.
- McMillan, Peter (2010). One Hundred Poets, One Poem Each. New York: Columbia University Press. ISBN 978-0-231-14399-8.
- Suzuki, Hideo; Yamaguchi, Shin'ichi; Yoda, Yasushi (2009). Genshoku: Ogura Hyakunin Isshu. Tokyo: Bun'eidō. ISBN 978-4-578-10082-9.
