= Kisen =

Buddhist Monk

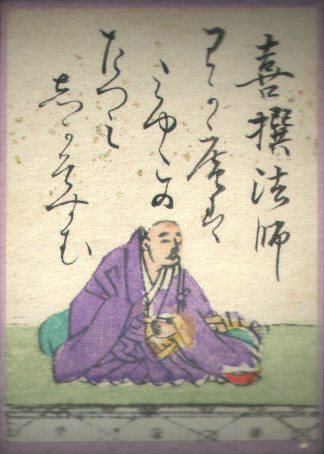
Kisen Hōshi, from the Hyakunin Isshu.

Kisen (喜撰) (fl. 810-824 CE) was an early Heian period Buddhist monk and waka poet. Little is known about his life other than that he lived in Mount Uji.

When Ki no Tsurayuki wrote the Japanese preface (仮名序, kanajo) of the Kokinshū, he selected Kisen as one of the six poetic sages (六歌仙, rokkasen) whose work was to be considered as superior. Tsurayuki says the following to comment on Kisen's work:

The use of words is a delicate thing—from start to end it does not express the thing that actually is. That is to say, to speak of the autumn moon, one compares it to the clouds at dawn.

Kisen is sometimes said to be the author of the poetry collection Waka sakushiki (倭歌作式), also known as the Kisen-shiki (喜撰式), but it is probably apocryphal and created well after the end of the Heian period.

The following two eika (詠歌) are the only poems that can be confidently traced back to him:

わが庵は都の辰巳しかぞすむ
世を宇治山と人はいふなり
waga io wa miyako no tatsumi shika zo sumu
yo o Ujiyama to hito wa iu nari
People say that I am a secluded hermit living in gloomy mount Uji, but my hermitage is just to the southeast of the capital!
(Kokin Wakashū 18:983; also Hyakunin Isshu, poem 8)

木の間より見ゆるは谷の蛍かも
いさりに海人の海へ行くかも
ki no ma yori miyuru wa tani no hotaru ka mo
isari ni ama no umi e yuku ka mo
What I see through the trees seems to be the fireflies from the valley—or is that the luring fires of the fishermen as they head to the sea?
(Gyokuyō Wakashū 3:400)
