= 840s in poetry =

This article covers 840s in poetry. Nationality words link to articles with information on the nation's poetry or literature (for instance, Irish or France).

== Births ==
Death years link to the corresponding "[year] in poetry" article. There are conflicting or unreliable sources for the birth years of many people born in this period; where sources conflict, the poet is listed again and the conflict is noted:

840:

- Saint Clement of Ohrid (died 916), Bulgarian writer and founder of the Ohrid Literary School

845:

- 1 August – Sugawara no Michizane (died 903), Japanese kanshi poet

849:

- Alfred the Great (died 899)

== Deaths ==
Birth years link to the corresponding "[year] in poetry" article:

842:

- Liu Yuxi (born 772), Chinese poet

843:

- Jia Dao (born 779), Chinese poet of discursive gushi and lyric jintishi

845:

- Abu Tammam (born 805), Arab poet and Muslim convert

846:

- Bai Juyi (also transliterated as Po Chü-I), (born 772), Chinese poet of the Tang dynasty

849:

- August 18: Walafrid Strabo (born 808), Frankish monk, historian, poet and theological writer

== See also ==
- Poetry
- 9th century in poetry
- 9th century in literature
- List of years in poetry

Other events:

- Other events of the 12th century
- Other events of the 13th century

9th century:

- 9th century in poetry
- 9th century in literature
