= Henjō =

Japanese writer

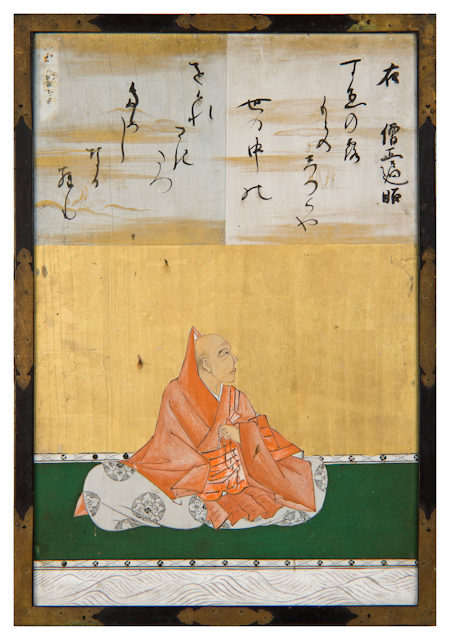
Sōjō Henjō by Kanō Tan'yū, 1648

Yoshimine no Munesada (良岑宗貞), better known as Henjō (遍昭 or 遍照; 816 – February 12, 890), was Japanese waka poet and Buddhist priest. In the poetry anthology Kokin Wakashū, he is listed as one of the six notable waka poets and one of the thirty-six immortals of poetry.

== Biography ==
Munesada was the eighth son of Dainagon Yoshimine no Yasuyo (良岑安世), who was a son of Emperor Kanmu, relegated to civilian life. He began his career as a courtier, and was later appointed to the position of kurōdo to Emperor Ninmyō. In 849 he was raised to the Head of Kurōdo (蔵人頭, Kurōdo no Tō). After Emperor Nimmyō died in 850, Munesada became a monk due to his grief, taking the religious name Henjō (literally “Universally Illuminated”). He was a priest of the Tendai school.

In 877 Munesada founded Gangyō-ji (元慶寺) in Yamashina, in the southeast part of Kyoto, but continued to be active in court politics. In 869 he was given another temple, Urin-in or Unrin-in (雲林院), in the north of Kyoto and managed both temples. In 885 he was ranked high priest and was called Kazan Sōjō (花山僧正).

He was rumored to have had a love affair with the famous female poet Ono no Komachi.

Thirty-five of his waka were included in imperial anthologies including Kokin Wakashū. The preface to Ki no Tsurayuki criticized him: "he knows how to construct waka, but there is less real emotion. It is like when you see a picture of a woman and it moves your heart".

His son, Sosei, was also a waka poet and a monk.

== Poetry ==
Henjō was famous for the following poem from the Hyakunin Isshu:

天つ風雲の通ひ路吹き閉ぢよ
をとめの姿しばしとどめむ
ama tsu kaze kumo no kayoiji fuki-toji yo
otome no sugata shibashi todomen
Breezes of Heaven, blow closed the pathway through the clouds to keep a little longer these heavenly dancers from returning home.
(Kokin Wakashū 17:872)
