= Fujiwara no Hamanari =

Japanese noble and poet of the Nara period

Fujiwara no Hamanari 藤原浜成
- Born: 724
- Died: March 12, 790
- Family: Fujiwara Kyōke
- Father: Fujiwara no Maro

Fujiwara no Hamanari (藤原 浜成; 724 – March 12, 790) was a Japanese noble and poet of the Nara period. He was the son of Fujiwara no Maro, and, according to the genealogy book Sonpi Bunmyaku, his mother was Uneme of Yakami no Kōri, Inaba Province, who is probably the same person who had a famous affair with Aki no Ōkimi. The collection of Japanese poems Man'yōshū does not include his works. With an unknown woman he had a son Toyohiko (豊彦), among other children with other women. The footnote of Sonpi Bunmyaku, however, notes that Toyohiko is actually the grandson of Hamanari. Hamanari achieved the court rank of ju san-mi (従三位) and the position of sangi.

== Life ==
As the heir of his father Maro, the founder of the Kyōke, Hamanari was a central figure of that clan. However, he was almost a generation younger than the second heads of the Nanke, Hokke, and Shikike, and this left him always a step behind their advancement.

Hamanari was conferred the rank of ju go-i no ge (従五位下) in 751. Under Empress Kōken, he held high-level positions in various ministries, but his promotion stagnated at this rank until Fujiwara no Nakamaro's rebellion in 764. He supported Empress Kōken's side in the conflict, and was promoted to ju shi-i no ge (従四位下) a month later. He held a position as director of the gyōbu-shō, and in 772 was promoted to ju shi-i no jō (従四位上) and sangi, joining the ranks of the kugyō.

In 773, Emperor Kōnin's heir Crown Prince Osabe (他戸親王) was disinherited, and according to the rekishi monogatari Mizukagami, Hamanari opposed Fujiwara no Momokawa's candidate Prince Yamabe, the future Emperor Kanmu, in favor of his brother by another mother, on the grounds that Yamabe's mother was descended from immigrants from Baekje.

Still, Hamanari was steadily promoted in Kōnin's court: in 774 to shō shi-i no ge (正四位下), in 775 to shō shi-i no jō (正四位上), and in 776 to ju san-mi (従三位).

In 781, after Emperor Kanmu assumed the throne, Hamanari was assigned away from the capital as director of the Dazaifu. Two months later, he was demoted within that body, had his retainers reduced from ten people to three and his stipend reduced by two-thirds, and was commanded to stop performing his actual duties and leave them to his supposed subordinate. This was likely intended by Kanmu to set an example for his opposition, and perhaps also as retribution. In 782, Hamanari's son-in-law Higami no Kawatsugu rebelled, and Hamanari was implicated and stripped of his high position as sangi. He was never able to return to the center of government. Hamanari died in the Daizaifu in 790, at the age of 67.

== Personality ==
Hamanari was well-read, and practiced divination and onmyōdō. He held positions in various ministries, but was unable to produce any impressive results. According to the Shoku Nihongi, this brought suffering to his subordinates and the people.

For poetics, he is best known for Kakyō Hyōshiki, the oldest extant piece of Japanese poetic criticism. In it, he attempts to apply phonetic rules of Chinese poetry to Japanese poetry.

== See also ==
- 8th century in poetry
- Japanese poetry
