= Lady Kasa =

Japanese female waka poet

- Born: Early 8th century

Lady Kasa (笠郎女, Kasa no Iratsume) was a Japanese female waka poet of the early 8th century.

Little is known of her except what is preserved in her 29 surviving poems in the Man'yōshū; all these were love poems addressed to her lover Ōtomo no Yakamochi who compiled the Man'yōshū (and who is known to have had at least 14 other lovers and to have broken up with her). Nonetheless, her love poems made her famous and inspired a later generation of female poets like Izumi Shikibu or Ono no Komachi.

== Poetry ==
wa ga yado no
yujagekusa no
shiratsuyu no
kenugani moto na
omoyuru kamo

Translation:

In the loneliness of my heart
I feel as if I should perish
Like the pale dew-drop
Upon the grass of my garden
In the gathering shades of twilight.
