= Abbas Ibn al-Ahnaf =

Arab Abbasid poet (750–809)

- عباس بن الأحنف
- Born: 750; Basra, Abbasid Caliphate
- Died: 809; Baghdad, Abbasid Caliphate
- Occupation: Poet
- Writing career
- Language: Arabic
- Notable work: Love poems (ghazal)

Abu al-Fadl Abbas Ibn al-Ahnaf (Arabic: عباس بن الأحنف) (750 in Basra-809), was an Arab Abbasid poet from the tribe of Banu Hanifa. His work consists solely of love poems (ghazal). It is "primarily concerned with the hopelessness of love, and the personae in his compositions seems resigned to a relationship of deprivation". The vocabulary he chose was simple and his style is fluent and easy.

He grew up in Baghdad, where he became a friend of the Abbasid caliph Harun al-Rashid. who employed him for the purpose of amusing him in time of leisure. His work was an acknowledged influence on Abdullah ibn al-Mu'tazz and Abu al-Atahiya.
