= Buhturi =

Arab poet of Abbasid period (821–897)

Buhturi Al-Walīd ibn Ubaidillah Al-Buḥturī أبو الوليد بن عبيدالله البحتري التنوخي
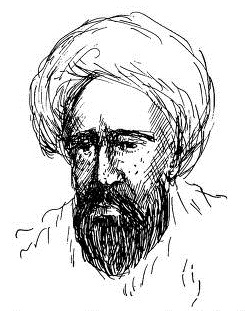
- A 1967 sketch is poet Buhturi by unknown artist from the book "Min Oyun al-Shi'r"by Naji al-Qashtini
- Born: 821; Manbij, Bilad al-Sham, Abbasid Caliphate (now Syria)
- Died: 897 (aged 75-76); Manbij, Abbasid Caliphate
- Resting place: Manbij
- Occupation: Arabic Poet
- Writing career
- Pen name: Al-Buhturi
- Language: Arabic
- Period: Islamic Golden Age (Abbasid era)

Al-Walīd ibn Ubaidillah Al-Buḥturī (Arabic: أبو الوليد بن عبيدالله البحتري التنوخي, romanized: al-Walīd ibn `Ubayd Allāh al-Buhturī) (821–97 AD; 206–84 AH) was an Arab poet born at Manbij in Islamic Syria, between Aleppo and the Euphrates. Like Abū Tammām (ابو تمام), he was of the tribe of Tayy, from the Buhturids.

== Biography ==
While still young, al-Buḥturī visited Abū Tammām at Homs, on whose recommendation the authorities at Ma'arrat an-Nu'man awarded al-Buḥturī an annual pension of 4000 dirhams. Later he went to Baghdād, where he wrote verses in praise of the caliph al-Mutawakkil and of the members of his court. Although long resident in Baghdād, he devoted much of his poetry to the praise of Aleppo, and his love-poetry dedicated to a girl, Aiwa, of that city. He died at Manbij in 897.

He was often compared with the famous poet Abu Tammâm, who was his contemporary and mentor. The poems of al-Buhturî are examples of the classical style in Arabic poetry. He worked as a panegyrist to make a living and gained fame with his panegyrics.

His dīwan (collected poetry) was edited and published twice in the 10th century. First by Abū Bakr al-Ṣūlī, in the section of whose book Kitāb Al-Awrāq (كتاب الاوراق) on Muḥadathūn (modern poets), al-Buḥturī is included among a group of fourteen poets whose dīwans al-Ṣūlī edited and arranged alphabetically according to the final consonant in each line. The second editor arranged his dīwan according to subject (1883, Istanbul). Like Abu Tammam, he made a collection of early poems also known as the Hamasah. These collections of poems are also known as Diwans.
