= Ōshikōchi no Mitsune =

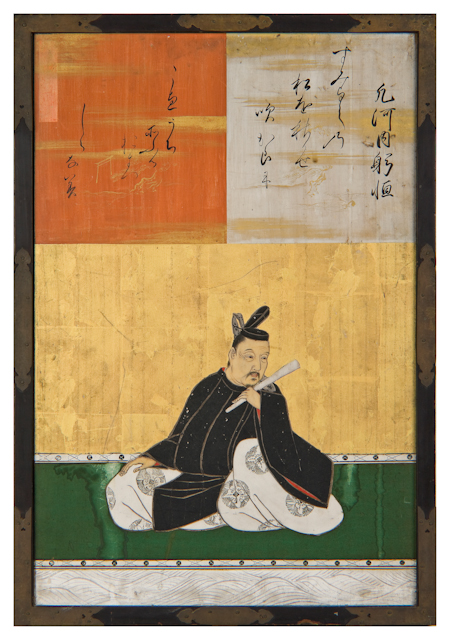
Ōshikōchi no Mitsune by Kanō Tan'yū, 1648

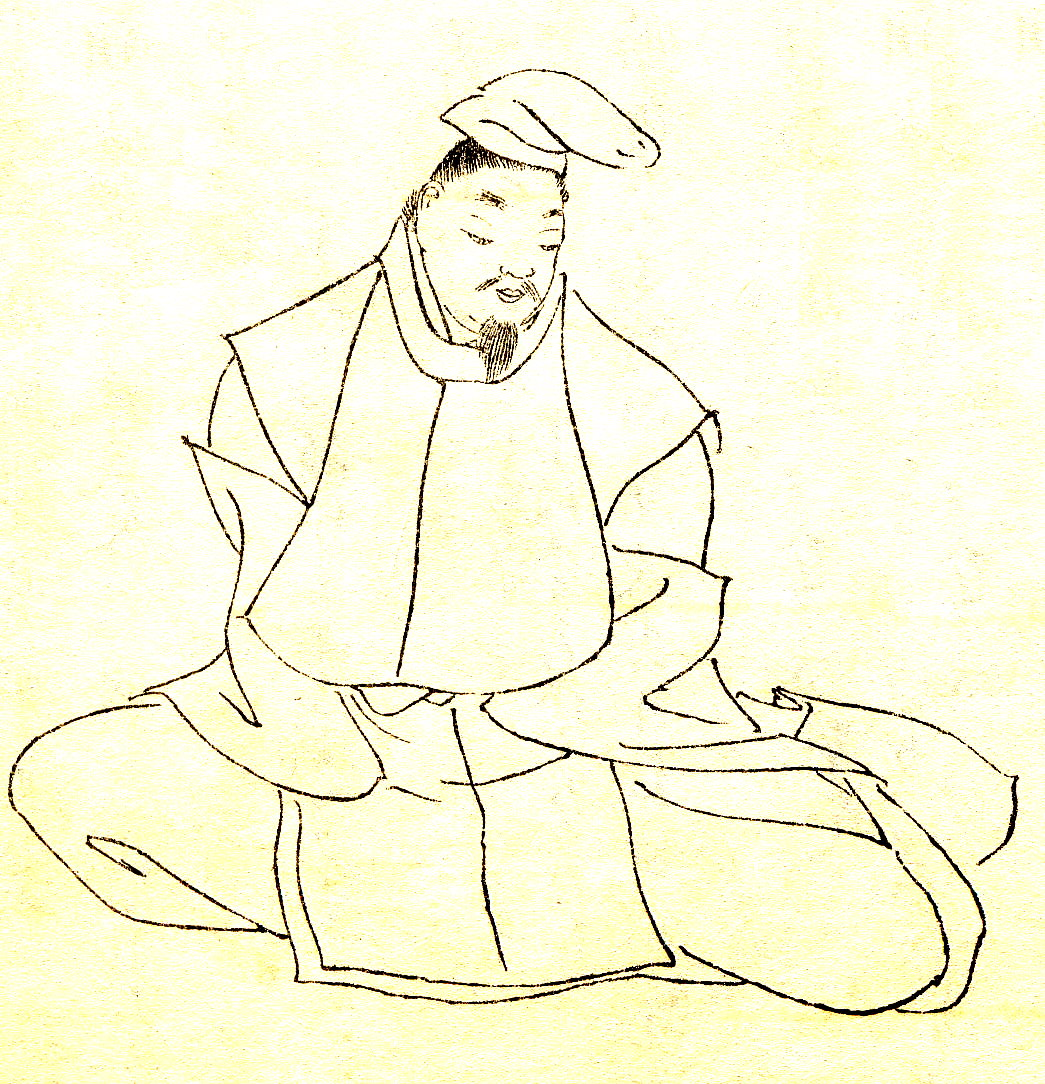
Ohshikohchi Mitsune by Kikuchi Yōsai

Ōshikōchi no Mitsune (凡河内 躬恒) was an early Heian administrator and waka poet of the Japanese court (859–925), and a member of the Thirty-six Poetry Immortals. He was sent as the governor of Kai, Izumi and Awaji provinces, and on his return to Kyoto was asked to participate in the compilation of the Kokin Wakashū. He was a master of poetic matches and his poems to accompany pictures on folding screens were widely admired for their quality. His influence at the time was commensurate with Ki no Tsurayuki, and he has an unusually large number of poems (193) included in the official poetry collections.

He is known to many Japanese today as one of his poems was included in the famous anthology Hyakunin Isshu.
