= Abu Tammam =

Muslim Arab poet of Abbasid era (died 850)

Ḥabīb ibn Aws al-Ṭā’ī
- حبيب بن أوس الطائي
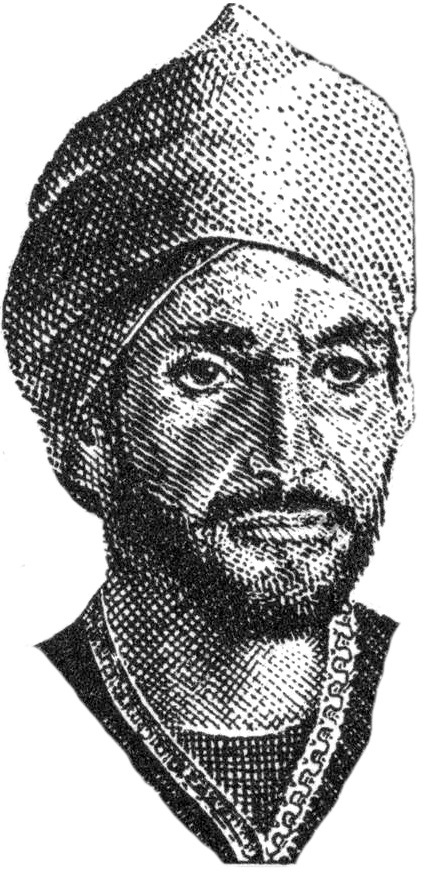
- Born: ca. 796/807 AD; Jasim
- Died: 845 AD; Mosul
- Writing career
- Pen name: Abū Tammām
- Language: Arabic
- Period: Islamic Golden Age (Abbasid era)

Ḥabīb ibn Aws al-Ṭā’ī (حبيب بن أوس الطائي; ca. 796/807 - 845), better known by his sobriquet Abū Tammām (أبو تمام), was an Arab Muslim poet. He is well known for compiling the Hamasah, which is considered to be one of the greatest anthologies of Arabic literature ever assembled. The Hamasah contained 10 books of poems, with 884 poems in total.

== Biography ==
Born in Jasim, a small town near Damascus northeast of the Sea of Galilee, Ḥabīb ibn Aws al-Ṭāʾī belonged to the Arab tribe of Tayy. According to some medieval biographers, a claim repeated by the Encyclopædia Britannica, Abu Tammam was the son of a Christian wine-seller named Thadhus. This narrative suggests Abu Tammam later converted to Islam, changed his father's name to Aws, and forged an affiliation with the Tayy tribe.

Mustafa Sadiq al-Rafi'i rejects this account as a fabrication created by the poet's rivals. Abu Tammam had many literary detractors during his lifetime. The 10th-century scholar Abu Bakr al-Suli, who authored a dedicated book defending Abu Tammam, documented that the poet faced intense hostility from traditional critics for breaking established poetic norms and pioneering the highly stylized Badi' poetic form. This literary rivalry led his opponents to attack not only his poetry but also his character and origins.

According to the scholar Ahmad ibn Ali al-Najashi (982–1058), Abu Tammam was a Twelver Shi'i Muslim by faith. He was a contemporary of the Twelver Imams Ali al-Rida and his son Muhammad al-Jawad, both of whom figured in some of his poems.

He seems to have spent his youth in Homs; though, according to one story, he was employed during his boyhood selling water at a mosque in Cairo. His first appearance as a poet was in Egypt, but as he failed to make a living there he went to Damascus, and then to Mosul. From there he sought patronage from the Syria-based caliph al-Ma'mun of the Abbasid Caliphate, but failed to impress him.

He then traveled towards the eastern part of the caliphate, eventually gaining admirers and patrons by praising various officials, such as the governor of Arminiya, Khalid ibn Yazid al-Shaybani, who reportedly gave him 10,000 dirhams on each occasion and financed his travels. Following the death of al-Ma'mun, the newly-famous Abu Tammam sought an audience with the new Caliph al-Mu'tasim, who immediately took him under his wing. After 833, he lived mostly in Baghdad, at the court of the caliph. From Baghdad, he visited Khorasan, where he enjoyed the favour of Abdallah ibn Tahir al-Khurasani. In approximately 845 he was in Ma'arrat al-Nu'man, where he met the poet Buhturi (c. 820–897). He died in Mosul in 845.

== Al-Hamasah ==
Abu Tammam is best known for compiling the Ḥamāsa (Arabic: حماسة, lit. 'valor' or 'bravery'), widely considered one of the most important anthologies of early Arabic poetry. According to traditional accounts, Abu Tammam compiled the work while snowbound in Hamadan, where he had access to the extensive library of Abu al-Wafa ibn Salama.

The anthology consists of ten books (chapters) classified by subject. Originally, Abu Tammam did not title the entire collection Al-Hamasah; rather, he named the first and longest chapter "Al-Hamasah" (Valor). Over time, the entire anthology became known by the title of its first chapter. The poems, many of which are selected fragments rather than complete odes, document pre-Islamic and early Islamic tribal history and ethics.

The success of Abu Tammam's compilation established the Hamasah as a distinct literary genre in Arabic literature, inspiring later poets like his student Buhturi, who belonged to the Tayy tribe as well, to compile similar anthologies. The work also generated extensive scholarly interest, resulting in nearly twenty classical commentaries by prominent medieval linguists and grammarians, such as al-Khatib al-Tibrizi and Al-Marzuqi. In Arabic literature, these two poets have often been compared. Generally, Abu Tammâm is accepted as the representative of the artificial (masnû') poetry style. On the other hand, his student al-Buhturî is generally regarded as the representative of the natural (matbû‘) poetry genre.

Two other collections of a similar nature are ascribed to Abu Tammam. His own poems have been somewhat neglected owing to the success of his compilations, but they enjoyed great repute in his lifetime. His poems reflect a stylistic break from prevailing oral-based concepts of Arab poetry, often describing historical events and people. They were distinguished for the purity of their style, the merit of the verse, and the excellent manner of treating subjects, and have been linked to the prevailing Mu'tazilism of the Abbasid period. His poems were published in Cairo in 1875.

According to Adonis (Ali Ahmad Said Esber), Abu Tammam "started out from a vision of poetry as a sort of creation of the world through language, comparing the relationship between the poet and the word to the relationship between two lovers, and the act of composing poetry to the sexual act."
