= Fujiwara no Sadakata =

Japanese poet (873–932)

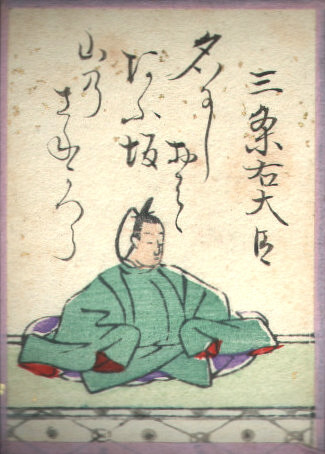
Fujiwara no Sadakata, in Ogura Hyakunin Isshu

Fujiwara no Sadakata (藤原定方; 873 – 6 September 932), also known as the Minister of the Right of Sanjō (三条右大臣, Sanjō Udaijin), was a Japanese poet and courtier.

The poet Fujiwara no Kanesuke was his cousin and son-in-law and his son Asatada was also a poet. He had another son by the name of Fujiwara no Tomoyori and his father was Fujiwara no Takafuji.

He was appointed as Udajin of the Third Ward and we see him in storied from the Tales of Yamato. 19 poems can be found in the Imperial Anthologies, and he also had a private collection of poems.

== Poetry ==
One of his poems is included in Ogura Hyakunin Isshu:

名にし負はば逢坂山のさねかづら
人に知られでくるよしもがな
na ni shi owaba Ōsaka-yama no sanekazura
hito ni shirarede kuru yoshi mogana
(Gosen Wakashū)

In English, this poem would read as such:

"If they bear such a name: On Mount Osaka, with the scarlet ivy that tells you to "Come and sleep!" Oh, how I wish there would a way to come to you, as if pulling such a vine, intangible to others."
