= Ki no Tomonori =

Japanese poet

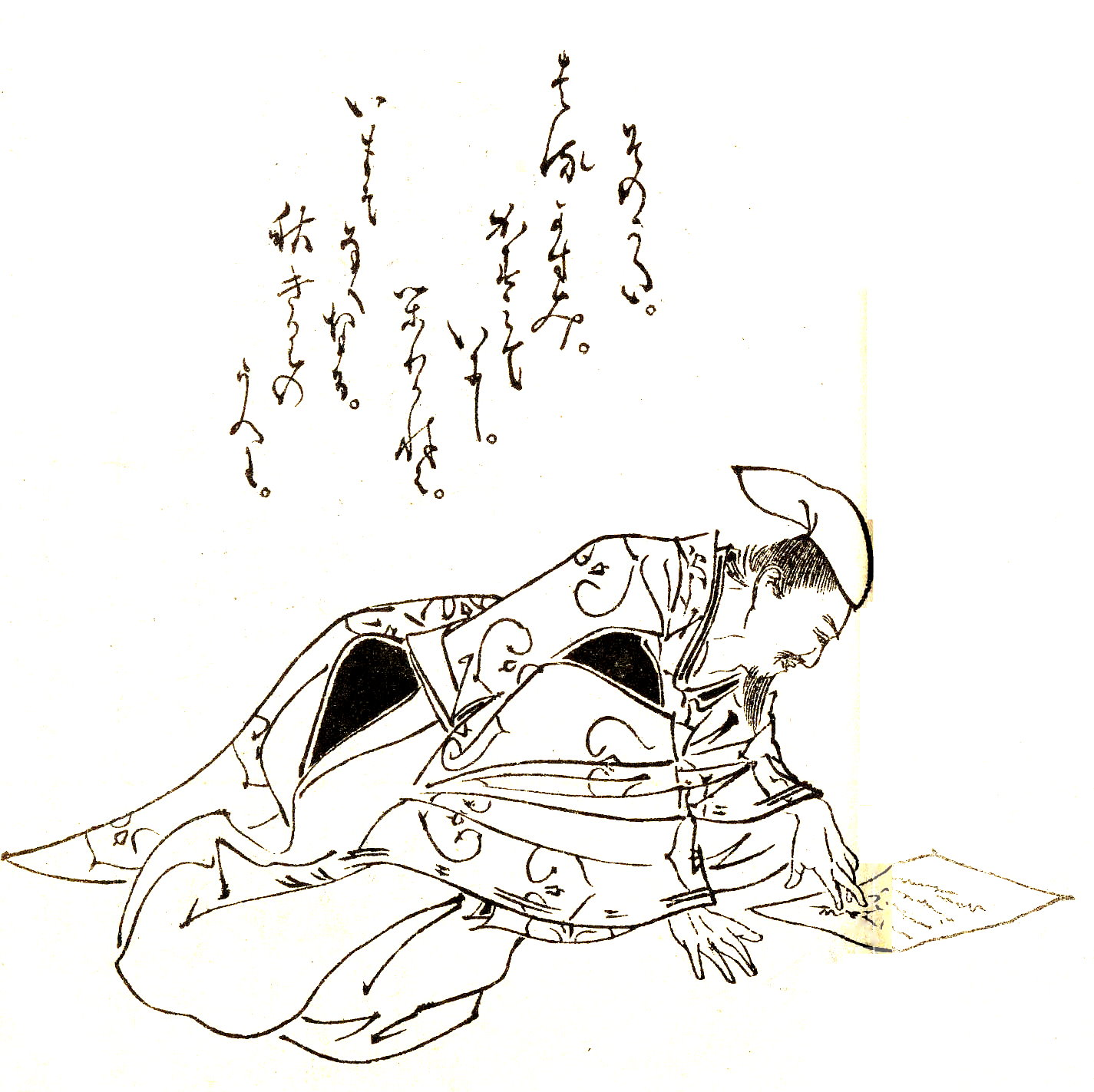
Ki no Tomonori by Kikuchi Yōsai

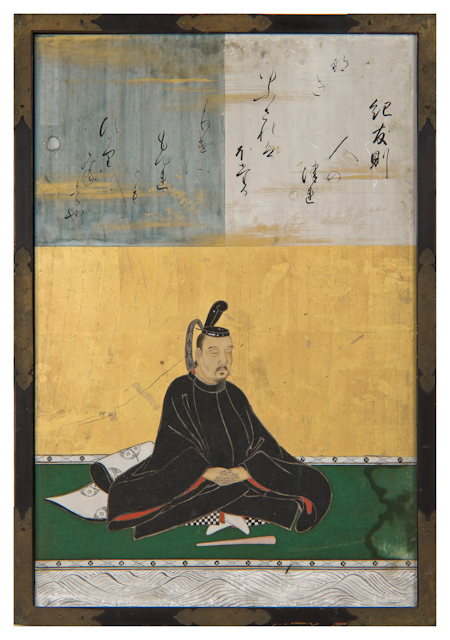
Ki no Tomonori by Kanō Tan'yū, 1648

Ki no Tomonori (紀 友則; c. 850 – c. 904) was an early Heian waka poet of the court and a member of the sanjūrokkasen or Thirty-Six Poetry Immortals. He was a compiler of the Kokin Wakashū, though he certainly did not see it to completion as the anthology includes a eulogy to him composed by Ki no Tsurayuki, his cousin and colleague in the compilation effort. Tomonori is the author of several poems in the Kokinshū, and a few of his poems appear in later official collections. A collection of his poems from various sources appeared as the Tomonori-shū.

Tomonori's most famous waka is included in Hyakunin Isshu that was compiled in the 13th century:

久方の光のどけき春の日に
静心なく花の散るらむ
hisakata no hikari nodokeki haru no hi ni
shizugokoro naku hana no chiruran
From afar of peaceful light, on the day of spring without quiet minds, do the [cherry] flowers fall?
(Kokin Wakashū 2:84)

This waka has been made a choral song "Hisakata No (In the Peaceful Light)" by Ruth Morris Gray and is sung by various choral groups of the world.
