= Fujiwara no Kanesuke =

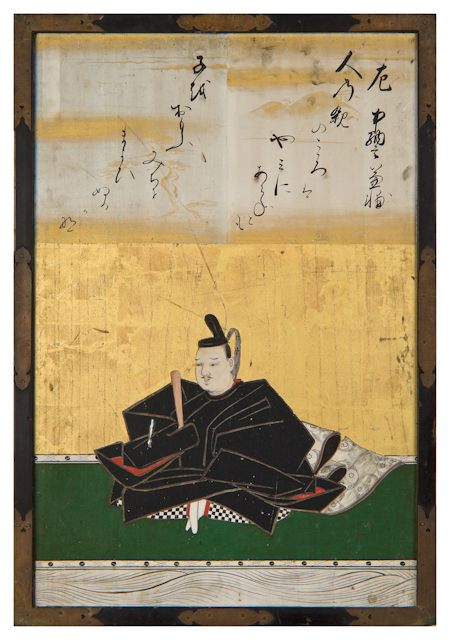
Chūnagon Kanesuke by Kanō Naonobu, 1648

Fujiwara no Kanesuke (藤原兼輔; 877–933), also known as the Riverbank Middle Counselor (堤中納言, Tsutsumi Chūnagon), was a middle Heian-period waka poet and Japanese nobleman. He is designated as a member of the Thirty-six Poetry Immortals.

His great-granddaughter was Murasaki Shikibu, author of the well-known monogatari the Tale of Genji.

His father was Fujiwara no Toshimoto.

== Poetry ==
Kanesuke's poems are included in several imperial poetry anthologies, including Kokin Wakashū and Gosen Wakashū. A personal poetry collection known as the Kanesuke-shū also remains.

The Tale of Heike contains "an almost direct quotation" of his poem in the Gosenshū (no. 1102). The passage goes, "...as clear as a father's understanding may be in all other matters, love blinds him when it comes to his own child."

One of his poems is included in the famous anthology Hyakunin Isshu:

みかの原わきて流るるいづみ川
いつ見きとてか恋しかるらむ
mika no hara wakite nagaruru Izumi-gawa
itsu miki tote ka koishikaruran
When was it I got my first glimpse? Like the Moor of Jars divided by the Izumi river I am split in two—so deep my longing for you.
(Shin Kokin Wakashū 11:996)

== See also ==
- Tsutsumi Chūnagon Monogatari
