= Rokkasen =

Japanese poets named in poetry anthology

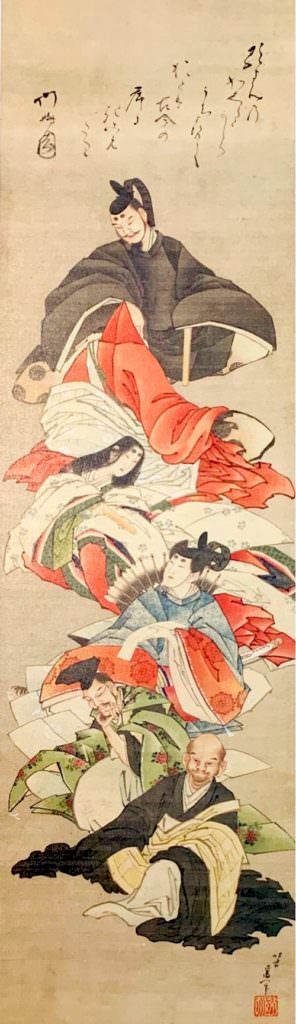
Rokkasen, by Hokusai

The Rokkasen (六歌仙, "six poetry immortals") are six Japanese poets of the mid-ninth century who were named by Ki no Tsurayuki in the kana and mana prefaces to the poetry anthology Kokin wakashū (c. 905–14) as notable poets of the generation before its compilers.

== History of the term ==
In their original appearance in the prefaces of the Kokin wakashū, the six rokkasen are not actually referred to with this term.

There are numerous phrases that show the conceptualization of these six as a cohesive group, but the term "Rokkasen" first appeared in an early Kamakura-period commentary on Kokin wakashū, titled Sanryūshō 三流抄.

== Members ==
The members of the rokkasen, and their total poems in Kokin wakashū, are as follows:

- Ōtomo no Kuronushi, 3 poems
- Ono no Komachi, 18 poems
- Ariwara no Narihira, 30 poems
- Kisen Hōshi, 1 poem
- Sōjō Henjō, 17 poems
- Fun'ya no Yasuhide, 1 poem

== Tsurayuki's Criticism ==
In his prefaces to the anthology Kokin wakashū, Ki no Tsurayuki first praises two poets, Kakinomoto no Hitomaro and Yamabe no Akahito, from the period before the rokkasen and then praises these six poets of the generation preceding his own, but also critiques what he considers to be weaknesses in their personal styles.

His criticism in both prefaces is as follows:

Kana preface

Among well-known recent poets, Archbishop Henjō masters style but is deficient in substance. It is no more satisfying to read one of his poems than to fall in love with a woman in a picture. The poetry of Ariwara Narihira tries to express too much content in too few words. It resembles a faded flower with a lingering fragrance. Fun'ya no Yasuhide's language is skillful, but his style is inappropriate to his content. His poems are like peddlers tricked out in fancy costumes. The language of the Ujiyama monk Kisen is veiled, leaving us uncertain about his meaning. Reading him is like trying to keep the autumn moon in sight when a cloud obscures it before dawn. Since not many of his poems are known, we cannot study them as a group in order to evaluate him. Ono no Komachi belongs to the same line as Sotoorihime of old. Her poetry is moving and lacking in strength. It reminds us of a beautiful woman suffering from an illness. Its weakness is probably due to her sex. The style of Ōtomo Kuronushi's poems is crude. They are like a mountain peasant resting under a flowering tree with a load of firewood on his back.

Mana preface

The Kazan Archbishop [Henjō] masters style, but his flowery language bears little fruit. His poems, like a picture of a beautiful woman, move our hearts without leading to anything. The poetry of the Ariwara Middle Captain [Narihira] tries to express too much content in too few words. It resembles a faded flower that retains its fragrance. Bunrin [Fun'ya no Yasuhide] deals cleverly with topics, but his style approaches vulgarity. His poems are like peddlers tricked out in fancy dress. The language of the Ujiyama monk Kisen is dazzling, but his poems do not flow smoothly. Reading him is like trying to keep the autumn moon in sight when a cloud obscures it before dawn. Ono no Komachi belongs to the same like as Sotoorihime of old. Her poetry is beautiful but weak, like an ailing woman wearing cosmetics. Ōtomo Kuronushi's poems belong to the line of Sarumaru of old. Although his poetry has a certain light, witty interest, the style is extremely crude, as though a peasant were resting in front of a flowering tree.

There are varying theories on both why Tsurayuki chose these six poets and why he chose to criticize them in this manner. Helen McCullough claims that they were selected because they all had distinctive personal styles in a time of homogeneity, and that by aligning them in his commentary with the six major styles of Han dynasty poetry, Tsurayuki was showing off his knowledge of those sources. Thomas Lammare also believes that Tsurayuki picked these poets to match the six Han styles, and focuses more on how Tsurayuki claimed these styles did not properly align heart (kokoro 心) and words (kotoba 言葉). On the other hand, Katagiri Yoichi believes that the inclusion of such an obscure figure as Priest Kisen, represented by a single poem, shows that Tsurayuki did not choose the six himself, but received them by some tradition.

== Legacy ==
The concept of the rokkasen had a lasting legacy on poetic scholarship both in the pre-modern and modern periods.

In 1009–1011, Fujiwara no Kintō compiled an expanded list known as the Thirty-Six Immortals of Poetry, which came to supplant this list of six. This led to the creation of similar lists based on this pattern, such as the "Thirty-Six Court Lady Immortals of Poetry," and the "Thirty-Six Heian-period Immortals of Poetry."

Many Japanese scholars of the twentieth century conceptualized the history of waka poetry in the ninth century as a time when it was overshadowed by Chinese poetry in the first part of the century and then returned to prominence by the end of the century. These narratives held that this time was a transitional period between the waka anthologies Man'yōshū and Kokin wakashū. When discussing the waka poetry of this period, some scholars have referred to it as the Rokkasen Period (六歌仙時代 rokkasen jidai), although there has been disagreement on when this period starts. Most of the scholars agree that it ends with the reign of Emperor Kōkō, but disagree on whether it begins with Emperor Ninmyō or Emperor Montoku. Both Hidehito Nishiyama and Ryōji Shimada conclude that they believe Ninmyō is the better choice for the start of this periodization.

Additionally, all but one of the Rokkasen, Ōtomo Kuronushi, appear in the famous collection of poetry, Hyakunin isshū.

== See also ==
- Thirty-Six Immortals of Poetry
- Kokin Wakashū
