= Kokin Wakashū =

Heian-era Japanese poetry anthology

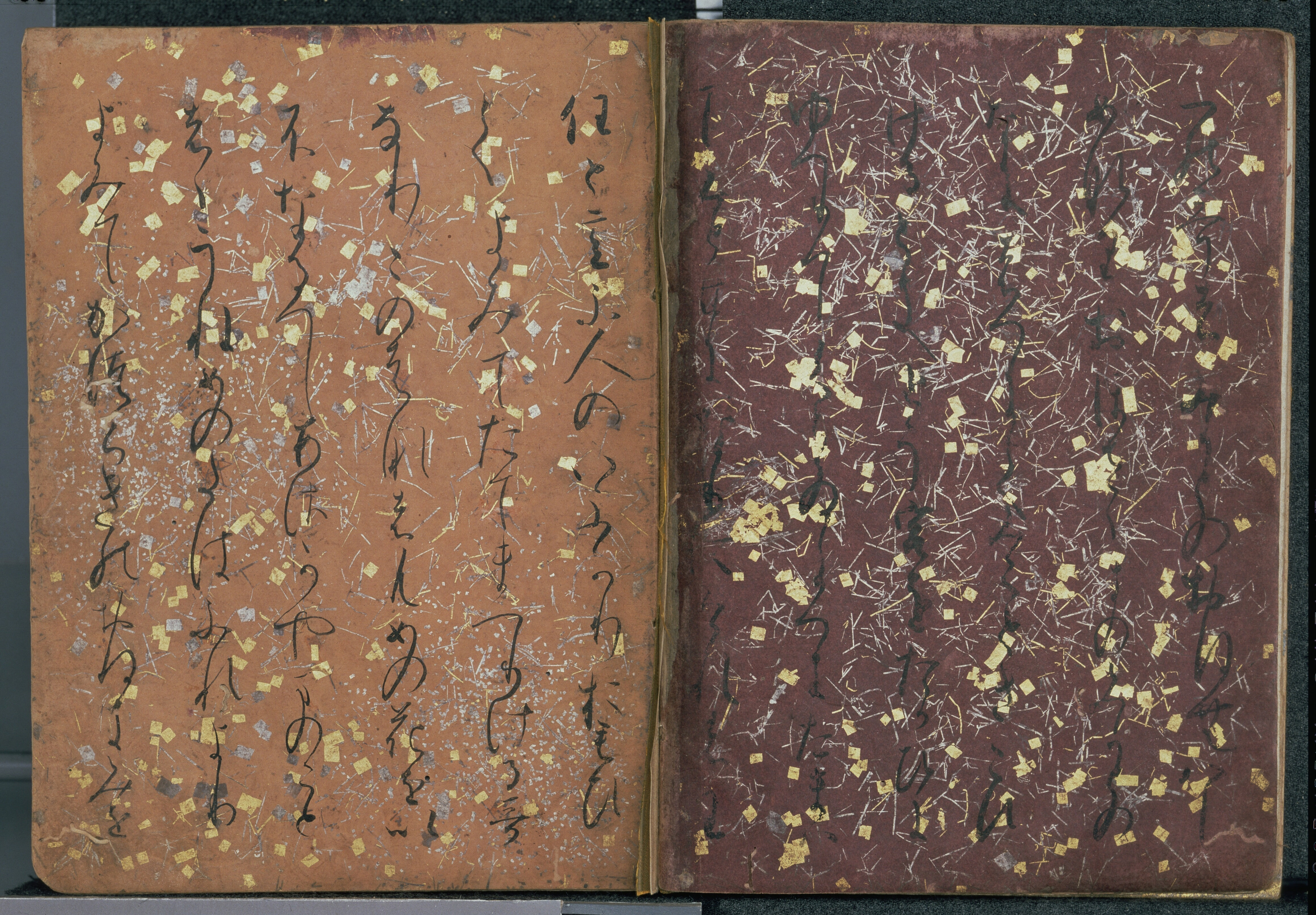
Section of the earliest extant complete manuscript of the Kokinshū (Gen'ei edition, National Treasure); early twelfth century; at the Tokyo National Museum

The Kokin Wakashū (古今和歌集; 'Collection of Japanese Poems of Ancient and Modern Times'), commonly abbreviated as Kokinshū (古今集), is an early anthology of the waka form of Japanese poetry, dating from the Heian period. An imperial anthology, it was conceived by Emperor Uda (r. 887–897) and published by order of his son Emperor Daigo (r. 897–930) in about 905. Its finished form dates to c. 920, though according to several historical accounts the last poem was added to the collection in 914.

The compilers of the anthology were four court poets, led by Ki no Tsurayuki and also including Ki no Tomonori (who died before its completion), Ōshikōchi no Mitsune, and Mibu no Tadamine.

== Significance ==
The Kokinshū is the first of the Nijūichidaishū (二十一代集), the 21 collections of Japanese poetry compiled at Imperial request. It was the most influential realization of the ideas of poetry at the time, dictating the form and format of Japanese poetry until the late nineteenth century; it was the first anthology to divide itself into seasonal and love poems. The primacy of poems about the seasons pioneered by the Kokinshū continues even today.

The Japanese preface by Ki no Tsurayuki is also the beginning of Japanese criticism as distinct from the far more prevalent Chinese poetics in the literary circles of its day. The anthology also included a Classical Chinese preface authored by Ki no Yoshimochi. The idea of including old as well as new poems was another important innovation, one which was widely adopted in later works, both in prose and verse. The poems of the Kokinshū were ordered temporally; the love poems, for instance, though written by many different poets across large spans of time, are ordered in such a way that the reader may understand them to depict the progression and fluctuations of a courtly love-affair. This association of one poem to the next marks this anthology as the ancestor of the renga and haikai traditions.

== Structure ==
The exact number of poems in the collection varies depending on the textual tradition. One online edition, which follows the Date Family text based on a manuscript prepared by Fujiwara no Teika, contains 1,111 poems. The collection is divided into twenty parts, reflecting older models such as the Man'yōshū and various Chinese anthologies. The organization of topics is however different from all earlier models, and was followed by all later official collections, although some collections like the Kin'yō Wakashū and Shika Wakashū scaled the model down to ten parts.

The following divisions of the Kokinshū mention the Japanese names of the parts, their modern readings, and their English translations.

Topic	Parts			
Seasons	1–2	Spring	春歌	haru no uta
Seasons	3	Summer	夏歌	natsu no uta
Seasons	4–5	Autumn	秋歌	aki no uta
Seasons	6	Winter	冬歌	fuyu no uta
	7	Congratulations	賀歌	ga no uta
	8	Partings	離別歌	wakare no uta
	9	Travel	羈旅歌	tabi no uta
	10	Acrostics	物名	mono no na
Love	11–15	Love	恋歌	koi no uta
Miscellany	16	Laments	哀傷歌	aishō no uta
Miscellany	17–18	Miscellaneous	雑歌	kusagusa no uta
Miscellany	19	Miscellaneous Forms	雑躰歌	zattai no uta
Miscellany	20	Traditional Poems from the Bureau of Song	大歌所御歌	ōutadokoro no on'uta

The compilers included the name of the author of each poem, and the topic (題, dai) or inspiration of the poem, if known. Major poets of the Kokinshū include Ariwara no Narihira, Ono no Komachi, Henjō and Fujiwara no Okikaze, apart from the compilers themselves. Inclusion in any imperial collection, and particularly the Kokinshū, was a great honour.

== Manuscripts ==
On October 20, 2010, Kōnan Women's University announced the discovery of a complete manuscript dating to c. 1220–1240. It is the oldest manuscript to contain both the Chinese and Japanese prefaces. It is split into two volumes, 15.9 cm tall by 14.6 cm wide, totaling 429 pages containing all 1111 poems. It is thought to be a copy of a manuscript made by Fujiwara no Teika, but the identity of the copier is unknown. The manuscript was purchased from a used book store in 1982 for 4,280,000 yen.

== Translations ==
A translation by Laurel Rasplica Rodd titled Kokinshū: A Collection of Poems Ancient and Modern was published in 1984 by Princeton University Press. Torquil Duthie translated a selection of one-third of the anthology under the title The Kokinshū: Selected Poems, published in 2023 by Columbia University Press. Both translations won the Japan–U.S. Friendship Commission Prize for the Translation of Japanese Literature: Rodd's in 1982 and Duthie's in 2023.

== See also ==
- List of Kokinshū poets
- List of National Treasures of Japan (writings: Japanese books)
- Shin Kokin Wakashū
- Heian literature
- Minamoto no Tōru
- Gosen Wakashū
