= 10th century in poetry =

This page is part of the List of years in poetry. The List of years in poetry and List of years in literature provide snapshots of developments in poetry and literature worldwide in a given year, decade or century, and allow easy access to a wide range of Wikipedia articles about movements, writers, works and developments in any timeframe. Please help to build these lists by adding and updating entries as you use them. You can access pages for individual years within the century through the navigational template at the bottom of this page, and you can access pages for other centuries through the navigational template to the right. To access the poetry pages by way of a single chart, please see the Centuries in poetry page or the List of years in poetry page.

Years link to the corresponding "[year] in poetry" articles.

== Arabic and Persian World ==
=== Events ===
- Golden age of Jewish culture in the Iberian Peninsula
- While imprisoned in Constantinople, from November 962 (or earlier) to 966, Abu Firas al-Hamdani writes some of his finest poetry, the collection known as al-Rūmiyyāt

=== Persian Poets ===
- Rabi'a Balkhi (10th century), Persian Poet
- Asjadi (10th/11th century), Persian Poet
- Farrukhi Sistani (10th/11th century), Persian Poet
- Ferdowsi (فردوسی), poet (935–1020), Persian Poet
- Abu Mansur Daqiqi (935/942–976/980), Persian Poet
- Rudaki (858 – 940/41), Persian Poet
- Kisai Marvazi (10th century), Persian Poet
- Mansur al-Hallaj (died 922)
- Abu al-Faraj al-Isfahani (897–967), Persian Poet
- Abu-Shakur Balkhi (915– )

=== Poets ===
- Lubna of Cordoba (10th century)
- Ayyuqi (10th century)
- Abu Mansur Daqiqi (935/942–976/980), Persian Poet

==== Births of Arabic-world poets ====
- Abu Firas al-Hamdani (c.932–968)
- Al-Mutanabbi (915–965)
- Badi' al-Zaman al-Hamadhani (967–1007)
- Abu ibn Abd Allah al-Ma'arri (973–1057)
- Samuel ibn Naghrillah (993–after 1056)
- Wallada bint al-Mustakfi (994–1091)

==== Deaths of Arabic-world poets ====
- Abdullah ibn al-Mu'tazz (861–908)
- Ibn Duraid (837–934)
- Al-Sanawbari (died 945)
- Al-Mutanabbi (915–965)
- Muhammad bin Hani al Andalusi al Azdi, (died 973)

=== Works ===
- Shahnameh, One of the greatest masterpieces of world and Persian literature.
- Publication of the Kitab al-Aghani or Book of Songs collecting important 9th century Arabic poetry and songs.
- Abu-Shakur Balkhi, Āfarin nama (944)

== Celtic and Germanic Europe ==
=== Events ===
- "Age of the Sagas" - most of the events described in the Norse and Icelandic Sagas date to the period from 930 to 1030 CE.
- The Rhyming Poem, included in the Exeter Book, is the first record of rhyming in English poetry.

=== Poets ===
- Deor, a scop, writes his Lament
- 10th century Norse and Icelandic skalds for which exact dates are unavailable:
  - Eilífr Goðrúnarson, author of Þórsdrápa
  - Einarr Helgason
  - Eysteinn Valdason
  - Eyvindr skáldaspillir, author of Hákonarmál and Háleygjatal
  - Guthormr sindri, author of Hákonardrápa
  - Egill Skalla-Grímsson (c. 910 – c. 990)
  - Kormákur Ögmundarson (Fl. 10th century)
  - Þórarinn Þórólfsson (Fl. 10th century), author of Þórarinn svarti or Þórarinn Máhlíðingur
  - Einar skálaglamm (Fl. 10th century), author of Einar Helgason
  - Hallfreður vandræðaskáld (Fl. 10th – 11th centuries), author of Hallfreður Óttarsson

=== Works ===
- The Battle of Maldon, perhaps written soon after the event of 991 it describes
- Exeter Book, a collection of Old English literature
- Eiríksmál (c. 954)

== Latin Europe ==
=== Poets ===
- Israel the Grammarian (c. 895–c. 965)

== Byzantine Empire and Slavic Europe ==
- Acritic songs in the Byzantine Empire
- Compilation of the ultimate edition of the Greek Anthology

== India ==
=== Poets ===
- Andal flourishes, writing in Tamil
- Nagavarma I writes in Kannada
- Sri Ponna writes in Kannada
- Shivakotiacharya writes in Kannada (approx. - may be earlier)

== China ==
=== Poets ===
- Wang Yucheng (954–1001)

== Japan ==
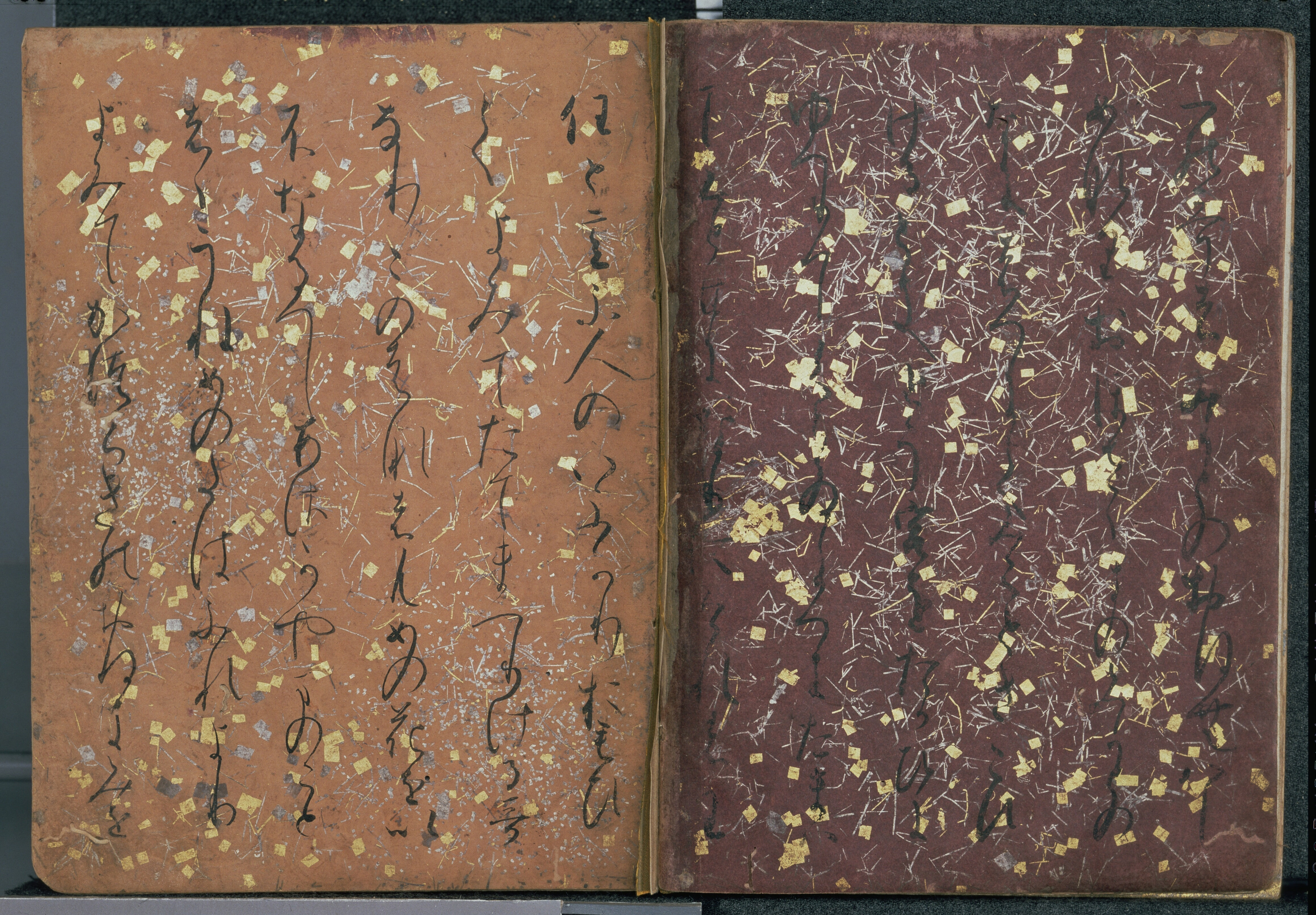
Kokin Wakashū

=== Works ===
Imperial waka anthologies:

- Kokin Wakashū the first imperial waka anthology, 20 scrolls, 1,111 poems, ordered by Emperor Daigo and completed c. 905, compiled by Ki no Tsurayuki, Ki no Tomonori, Ōshikōchi and Mibu no Tadamine
- Gosen Wakashū 20 scrolls, 1,426 poems, ordered in 951 by Emperor Murakami

=== Poets ===
- Akazome Emon 赤染衛門 (956–1041) waka poet of the mid-Heian period; a member of both the Thirty-six Elder Poetic Sages and Kintō's 36 female poetry immortals (or "sages") of the Kamakura period
- Fujiwara no Asatada 藤原朝忠 also 中納言朝忠 (911–966), middle Heian period waka poet and nobleman; one of the Thirty-six Poetry Immortals; one of his poems is in the Hyakunin Isshu anthology
- Fujiwara no Kintō 藤原公任, also known as "Shijō-dainagon" (966–1041), poet and critic; one of the Thirty-six Poetry Immortals; has poems in anthologies including the Shūi Wakashū, the Wakan rōeishū, and Shūi Wakashū
- Fujiwara no Masatada 藤原雅正 (died 961), poet with family connections to several other poets: first son of Fujiwara no Kanesuke; grandfather of Murasaki Shikibu ("Lady Murasaki"); older brother of Fujiwara no Kiyotada; married a daughter of Fujiwara no Sadakata; father of Fujiwara no Tametoki; also acquainted with Ki no Tsurayuki
- Fujiwara no Nagayoshi 藤原長能, also known as "Fujiwara no Nagatō" (949 – death year unknown), poet and a court bureaucrat of the Heian period; one of the "Thirty-six Poetry Immortals"; taught waka to the poet Nōin
- Fujiwara no Takamitsu 藤原高光 (c. 939–994), middle Heian period waka poet and nobleman; one of the Thirty-six Poetry Immortals; has poems in imperial poetry anthologies starting with Gosen Wakashū
- Fujiwara no Tametoki 藤原為時 (died 1029?), poet, minor official and governor of various provinces, scholar of Chinese literature and the father of Murasaki Shikibu ("Lady Murasaki")
- Fujiwara no Toshiyuki 藤原敏行, also "Fujiwara Toshiyuki no Ason" 藤原敏行朝亜 (birthdate unknown, died in 901 or 907), middle Heian period waka poet and nobleman; one of the Thirty-six Poetry Immortals; has a poem in the anthology Hyakunin Isshu and poems in several imperial poetry anthologies, including Kokin Wakashū and Gosen Wakashū
- Izumi Shikibu 和泉式部 nicknamed "The Floating Lady" 浮かれ女 for her series of passionate affairs (born c. 976 – year of death unknown, sometime after 1033), mid-Heian period poet, novelist and noblewoman; one of the Thirty-six Poetry Immortals; known for a sequence of affairs at the court in the capital; close friend of Akazome Emon, rival of Lady Murasaki, and mother of poet Koshikibu no Naishi; poetry praised by Fujiwara no Kinto
- Ki no Tomonori 紀友則 (c. 850 – c. 904), early Heian period waka poet of the court, one of the Thirty-six Poetry Immortals; one of the four compilers of the Kokin Wakashū anthology
- Ki no Tsurayuki 紀貫之 (872–945) Heian period waka poet, government official and courtier; son of Ki no Mochiyuki; one of four compilers of the Kokin Wakashū anthology; provincial governor of Tosa province (930–935) and later possibly governor of Suo province
- Kishi Joō 徽子女王, also Yoshiko Joō 承香殿女御 Jokyōden Joō or 斎宮女御 Saigū no Nyōgo (929–985), middle Heian period Waka poet
- Kiyohara no Motosuke, 清原元輔 (908–990), one of the Five Men of the Pear Chamber
- Mibu no Tadamine 壬生忠岑 (active 898–920), Japanese early Heian period waka poet of the court; one of the Thirty-six Poetry Immortals; father of Mibu no Tadami
- Minamoto no Kintada 源公忠, also 源公忠朝臣 (889–948), middle Heian period waka poet and nobleman; one of the Thirty-six Poetry Immortals, along with his son Minamoto no Saneakira; an official in the imperial treasury; has poems in imperial poetry anthologies, starting with the Goshūi Wakashū
- Minamoto no Muneyuki 源宗于, also Minamoto no Muneyuki Ason 源宗于朝臣 (died 983), early Heian period waka poet and nobleman; one of the Thirty-six Poetry Immortals; has a poem in the Hyakunin Isshu anthology
- Minamoto no Saneakira 源信明 (910–970), middle Heian period waka poet and nobleman; he and his father, Minamoto no Kintada, are two of the Thirty-six Poetry Immortals; his poems are in imperial poetry anthologies from the Goshūi Wakashū onward
- Minamoto no Shigeyuki 源重之 (died 1000), early Heian period waka poet and nobleman; one of the Thirty-six Poetry Immortals; has a poem in the Hyakunin Isshu anthology
- Minamoto no Shitagō 源順 (911–983), waka poet, scholar and nobleman; one of the Five Men of the Pear Chamber and Thirty-six Poetry Immortals; author of the Minamoto no Shitagōshū poetry collection; some scholars claim that he also wrote the Taketori Monogatari; original compiler of the Wamyō Ruijushō, the first extant Japanese dictionary organized into semantic headings
- Nakatsukasa 中務 (912–991), middle Heian period Waka poet
- Nōin 能因, lay name: Tachibana no Nagayasu 橘永愷 (988 – c. 1051), late Heian period poet and monk; one of the "Thirty-six Medieval Poetry Immortals"
- Ono no Komachi 小野 小町 or おののこまち (c. 825 – c. 900), early Heian period waka poet, one of the Rokkasen — the Six best Waka poets; one of the Thirty-six Poetry Immortals; noted as a rare beauty and became a symbol of a beautiful woman in Japan
- Ōnakatomi no Yorimoto 大中臣頼基 (c. 886–958), middle Heian period waka poet and nobleman; one of the Thirty-six Poetry Immortals
- Sei Shōnagon 清少納言 (c. 966–1017), middle Heian Period author, poet and court lady who served Empress Teishi/Empress Sadako; best known as the author of The Pillow Book
- Shirome (fl. 10th century), minor waka poet and common prostitute (a woman)
- Sugawara no Michizane 菅原道真, also known as "Kan Shōjō" 菅丞相, (845–903), Heian Period scholar, poet and politician; grandson of Sugawara no Kiyotomo; also wrote Chinese poetry

== Decades and years ==
890s	890	891	892	893	894	895	896	897	898	899
900s	900	901	902	903	904	905	906	907	908	909
910s	910	911	912	913	914	915	916	917	918	919
920s	920	921	922	923	924	925	926	927	928	929
930s	930	931	932	933	934	935	936	937	938	939
940s	940	941	942	943	944	945	946	947	948	949
950s	950	951	952	953	954	955	956	957	958	959
960s	960	961	962	963	964	965	966	967	968	969
970s	970	971	972	973	974	975	976	977	978	979
980s	980	981	982	983	984	985	986	987	988	989
990s	990	991	992	993	994	995	996	997	998	999
1000s	1000	1001	1002	1003	1004	1005	1006	1007	1008	1009
