= 10th century in literature =

This article is a list of literary events and publications in the 10th century.

== Works ==
Title	Author	Description	Date
Book of Fixed Stars	Abd al-Rahman al-Sufi	Treatise on astronomy including a star catalogue and star charts	c. 964
The Pillow Book	Sei Shōnagon	diary / journal / memoire	c. 990s-1000s Japan
Kavijanasrayam	Malliya Rechana	Telugu poetic prosody book	c. 900-950
Paphnutius	Hrotsvitha of Gandersheim	Play	c. 935-1002
Vikramarjuna Vijaya	Adikavi Pampa	Kannada version of the epic Mahabharata	c. 939?
Al-Tasrif	Abu al-Qasim al-Zahrawi	Medical encyclopedia	Completed in 1000
Josippon	Joseph ben Gorion	History of the Jews from the destruction of Babylon to the Siege of Jerusalem	940
Encyclopedia of the Brethren of Purity	Brethren of Purity	Philosophical-scientific encyclopedia	10th century
Aleppo Codex	Shlomo ben Buya'aa	Copy of the Bible	920
De Administrando Imperio	Constantine VII	Political geography of the world	c. 950
Three Treatises on Imperial Military Expeditions	Associated with Constantine VII	Treatises providing information on military campaigns in Asia Minor	Based on material compiled in the early 10th century, current form dates to the late 950s
Geoponica	Compiled under the patronage of Constantine VII	Agricultural manual	Compiled in its present form in the 10th century
Þórsdrápa	Eilífr Goðrúnarson	Skaldic poem with Thor as its protagonist	10th century
Hákonarmál	Eyvindr skáldaspillir	Poem composed in memory of Haakon I of Norway	After 961
"Háleygjatal"	Eyvindr skáldaspillir	Poem seeking to establish the Hlaðir dynasty as the social equal of the Hárfagri dynasty	End of the 10th century
Kitab al-Aghani	Abu al-Faraj al-Isfahani	Collection of songs, biographical information, and information relating to the lives and customs of the early Arabs and of the Muslim Arabs of the Umayyad and Abbasid Caliphates	10th century
Shahnameh	Ferdowsi	Epic poem	Begun c. 977, finished 1010
Benedictional of St. Æthelwold	Godeman (a scribe) for Æthelwold of Winchester	Benedictional including pontifical benedictions for use at mass at different points of the liturgical year	Written and illuminated between 963 and 984
Tactica of Emperor Leo VI the Wise	Leo VI the Wise	Handbook dealing with military formations and weapons	Early 10th century
Exeter Book	Given to Exeter Cathedral by Bishop Leofric	Collection of Old English poetry, including "The Wife's Lament"	Copied c. 975
"Deor"	Given to Exeter Cathedral by Bishop Leofric (part of the Exeter Book)	The only surviving Old English poem with a fully developed refrain; possibly of a Norse background	Copied c. 975
"The Rhyming Poem"	Given to Exeter Cathedral by Bishop Leofric (part of the Exeter Book)	Poem in couplets utilising rhyme, which was rarely used in Anglo-Saxon literature	Copied c. 975
Extensive Records of the Taiping Era	Compiled by Li Fang	Collection of anecdotes and stories	977–78
Imperial Readings of the Taiping Era	Compiled by Li Fang	Encyclopedia	984
Greek Anthology	Originally compiled by Meleager, combined by Constantinus Cephalas with works by Philippus of Thessalonica, Diogenianus, Agathias and others; part of a later revision compiled by Maximus Planudes	Collection of Greek epigrams, songs, epitaphs and rhetorical exercises	Originally compiled in the 1st century BCE, expanded in the 9th century, revised and augmented in the 10th century, expanded again from a manuscript compiled in 1301
Wamyō Ruijushō (倭名類聚抄)	Compiled by Minamoto no Shitagō (源 順)	Collection of Japanese terms	Mid-930s
Gosen Wakashū (後撰和歌集)	Ordered by Emperor Murakami	Imperial waka anthology	c. 951
Yamato Monogatari (大和物語)	Unknown	Uta monogatari (narrative fiction with waka poetry)	c. 951-956
History of the Prophets and Kings	Muhammad ibn Jarir al-Tabari	Universal history	Unfinished at the time of Tabari's death in 956
Praecepta Militaria	Attributed to Nikephoros II Phokas	Military manual	965
Escorial Taktikon	Edited by Nikolaos Oikonomides (1972)	Precedence list	Drawn up between 975 and 979
Bodhi Vamsa	Upatissa of Upatissa Nuwara	Prose poem describing the bringing of a branch of the Bodhi tree to Sri Lanka in the 3rd century	c. 980
Old History of the Five Dynasties	Xue Juzheng	Account of China's Five Dynasties	974
Chronicon Salernitanum	Anonymous	Annals	974
Chronicon Æthelweardi	Æthelweard	Latin version of Anglo-Saxon Chronicle	After 975 and probably before 983
Gesta Berengarii imperatoris	Anonymous	Epic poem	Early 10th century
Kokin Wakashū (古今和歌集)	Compiled by a committee of bureaucrats recognised as superior poets	Anthology of Japanese poetry	Compiled c. 905
Annales Cambriae	Diverse sources	Chronicle believed to cover a period beginning 447	c. 970
Waltharius	Unknown Frankish monk	Epic poem about the Germanic Heroic Age	First circulated/published c. 850 to c. 950
Leofric Missal	Unknown scribes	Service book	Core written c. 900, with an addition made c. 980
"Eiríksmál"	Unknown	Poem composed in memory of Eric Bloodaxe	Probably 10th century
Khaboris Codex	Unknown	Oldest known copy of the New Testament	10th century
Suda	Unknown	Encyclopedia	10th century
Tractatus coislinianus	Unknown	Manuscript containing a statement of a Greek theory of comedy	10th century
Beowulf	Unknown	Epic	Believed to have been written between the 7th and 10th centuries
Ishinpō	Tanba Yasunori	Encyclopedia of Chinese medicine	Issued in 982
Hudud al-'alam	Unknown	Concise geography of the world	Begun 982–983
Ōjōyōshū	Genshin	Kanbun Buddhist text	985
Karnataka Kadambari	Nagavarma I	Romance in champu (mixed prose and verse)	Late 10th century
Chhandombudhi	Nagavarma I	Treatise on prosody in Vijayanagara literature in Kannada	c. 990
Completes the first draft of Shahnameh (The Book of Kings)	Ferdowsi	a long epic poem, the national epic of Greater Iran	999
Tomida femina	Anonymous	Charm, the oldest known complete Occitan poem	10th century
The Battle of Maldon	Anonymous	Old English heroic poem (earliest manuscript lost 1731)	Between the Battle of Maldon in Spring 991 and 1000?
Passio Sancti Eadmundi	Abbo of Fleury	Hagiographic account of the death of Edmund the Martyr	10th century

== Authors ==
Name	Description	Dates
Abu Firas al-Hamdani	Arab poet	932–968
Abū Kāmil Shujāʿ ibn Aslam	Algebraist	c. 850 – c. 930
Ælfric of Eynsham	Author of homilies in Old English, and three works to assist in learning Latin, the Grammar, the Glossary and the Colloquy (probably with Aelfric Bata. Also a Bible translator	c. 955 – c. 1010
Æthelweard	Anglo-Saxon historian	Before 973 – c. 998
Akazome Emon (赤染衛門)	Japanese waka poet	fl. 976–1041
Abu al-Hassan al-Amiri	Philosopher born in modern Iran	Died 992
Al-Maʿarri	Arab poet born near Aleppo, Syria	973–1057
Al-Masudi	Arab historian and geographer	c. 896 – 956
Al-Mutanabbi	Arabic poet	915–965
Ibn al-Nadim	Author of the Fehrest, an encyclopedia	c. 932 – c. 990
Al-Natili	Arabic-language author in the medical field	fl. c. 985–90
Alchabitius	Author of Al-madkhal ilā sināʿat Aḥkām al-nujūm, a treatise on astrology; from Iraq	fl. c. 950
Aldred the Scribe	Author of the glosses in the Lindisfarne Gospels	10th century
Alhazen	Mathematician, died in Cairo	c. 965 – c. 1040
Asser	Welsh biographer and bishop, died in Sherborne	died 909
Bal'ami	Vizier to the Samanids and translator of the Ṭabarī into Persian	Died c. 992–7
Abu-Shakur Balkhi	Persian writer	915–960s
Abu Zayd al-Balkhi	Persian Muslim polymath	849–934
Rabia Balkhi	Arabic- and Persian-language poet	Died 940
Bard Boinne	Described in the Annals of the Four Masters as the "chief poet of Ireland"	Died 932
Muḥammad ibn Jābir al-Ḥarrānī al-Battānī	Arab astronomer	c. 850 – c. 929
David ben Abraham al-Fasi	Karaite lexicographer from Fes	10th century
Abū Rayḥān al-Bīrūnī	Scholar and polymath of the late Samanids and early Ghaznavids	973 – after 1050
Abū al-Wafā' Būzjānī	Mathematician and astronomer; author of Kitāb fī mā yaḥtaj ilayh al-kuttāb wa'l-ʿummāl min ʼilm al-ḥisāb, an arithmetic textbook; of Persian descent	940 – 997 or 998
Cináed ua hArtacáin	Irish poet and author of dinsenchas poems	Died 974
Constantine VII	Byzantine emperor and author of De Administrando Imperio and De Ceremoniis	905–959
Abu-Mansur Daqiqi	Poet, probably born in Ṭūs	After 932 – c. 976
Shabbethai Donnolo	Italian physician and writer on medicine and astrology	913 – after 982
Egill Skallagrímsson	Viking skald and adventurer	c. 910 – c. 990
Eilífr Goðrúnarson	Icelandic skald	c. 1000
Einarr Helgason	Skald for Norwegian ruler Haakon Sigurdsson	fl. late 10th century
Patriarch Eutychius of Alexandria	Author of a history of the world and treatises on medicine and theology	876–940
Eysteinn Valdason	Icelandic skald	c. 1000
Eyvindr skáldaspillir	Icelandic skald	Died c. 990
Al-Farabi	Muslim philosopher	c. 878 – c. 950
Abu al-Faraj al-Isfahani	Literary scholar and author of an encyclopedic work on Arabic music	897–967
Ferdowsi	Persian poet and author of the Shahnameh, the Persian national epic	c. 935 – c. 1020–26
Flodoard	French historian and chronicler	894–966
Frithegod	British poet, author of Breviloquium vitae Wilfridi, a version of Stephen of Ripon's Vita Sancti Wilfrithi written in hexameters	fl. c. 950 – c. 958
Fujiwara no Asatada (藤原 公任)	One of the Thirty-six Poetry Immortals	c. 910 – c. 966
Fujiwara no Kintō (藤原 公任)	Japanese poet and critic responsible for the initial gathering of the Thirty-six Poetry Immortals	966–1041
Fujiwara no Takamitsu (藤原 高光)	Japanese poet, one of the Thirty-six Poetry Immortals	Died 994
Fujiwara no Tametoki (藤原 為時)	Japanese waka and kanshi poet and father of Murasaki Shikibu	Late 10th – early 11th century
Fujiwara no Toshiyuki (藤原 敏行)	Japanese poet	Died c. 901
Kushyar Gilani	Iranian astronomer	fl. second half of the 10th/early 11th century
Guthormr sindri	Norwegian skald	10th century
Nathan ben Isaac ha-Babli	Babylonian historian	10th century
Hallfreðr vandræðaskáld	Icelandic skald	Died c. 1007
Badi' al-Zaman al-Hamadani	Arabic belle-lettrist and inventor of the maqāma genre	968–1008
Abū Muhammad al-Hasan al-Hamdānī	Arabian geographer	Died 945
Hovhannes Draskhanakerttsi	Armenian man of letters	c. 840 – c. 930
Hrotsvitha	German dramatist and poet	c. 935 – c. 1002
Ibn al-Faqih	Persian historian and geographer	Died 903
Ibn al-Jazzar	Physician	Died 970/980
Ibn al-Qūṭiyya	Historian of Muslim Spain, born in Seville and of Visigothic descent	Died 977
Ibn Duraid	Arabian poet	837–934
Ibn Hawqal	Author of Kitāb al-masālik wa'l-mamālik, a book on geography; born in Nisibis	Second half of the 10th century – after 988
Ibn Juljul	Author of Tabaqāt al atibbāʼ wa'l-hukamả, a summary of the history of medicine	944 – c. 994
Ibn Khordadbeh	Author on subjects including history, genealogy, geography, music, and wines and cookery; of Persian descent	c. 820 – c. 912
Ioane-Zosime	Georgian religious writer, hymnographer and translator	10th century
Lady Ise (伊勢)	Japanese waka poet, mother of Nakatsukasa	c. 877 – c. 940
Isaac Israeli ben Solomon	Physician and philosopher, born in Egypt	832–932
Israel the Grammarian	European scholar, poet and bishop	c. 895–c. 965
Izumi Shikibu (和泉式部)	Japanese waka poet	Born c. 976
Abraham ben Jacob	Spanish Jewish geographer	fl. second half of the 10th century
Jayadeva	Indian mathematician	Lived before 1073
Al-Karaji	Mathematician, lived in Baghdad	953 – c. 1029
Abū Ja'far al-Khāzin	Astronomer and number theorist from Khurasan	c. 900 – c. 971
Abu-Mahmud Khojandi	Astronomer and mathematician born in Khujand	c. 945 – 1000
Muhammad ibn Ahmad al-Khwarizmi	Author of Mafātih al-'ulũm (Keys of the Sciences)	fl. c. 975
Ki no Tokibumi	Japanese poet, one of the Five Men of the Pear Chamber	fl. c. 950
Ki no Tomonori (紀 時文)	Japanese waka poet and one of the compilers of the Kokin Wakashū	c. 850 – c. 904
Ki no Tsurayuki (紀 貫之)	Japanese waka poet, critic and diarist; one of the compilers of the Kokin Wakashū	c. 872 – c. 945
Kishi Joō (徽子女王)	Japanese poet and one of the Thirty-six Poetry Immortals	929–985
Kiyohara no Motosuke (清原 元輔)	Japanese poet: one of the Five Men of the Pear Chamber and the Thirty-six Poetry Immortals, and father of Sei Shōnagon	908–990
Leo the Deacon	Byzantine historian	Born c. 950
Liutprand of Cremona	Italian historian and author	c. 922 – 972
Luo Yin (羅隱)	Japanese poet	833–909
'Ali ibn al-'Abbas al-Majusi	Author of Kāmil al-Ṣinā'ah al-Tibbiyyah, a compendium; born near Shiraz	First quarter of the 10th century – 994
Abu Nasr Mansur	Astronomer, born in Gīlān	c. 950 – c. 1036
Mansur Al-Hallaj	Arabic-speaking mystic and author of the Ṭawāsin, a collection of 11 reflective essays; born near Beyza	857–922
Ebn Meskavayh	Persian writer on topics including history, theology, philosophy and medicine	Died 1030
Symeon the Metaphrast	Principal compiler of the legends of saints in the Menologia of the Greek Orthodox Church	Second half of the 10th century
Mibu no Tadamine	Japanese waka poet and one of the Thirty-six Poetry Immortals	fl. 898–920
Michitsuna no Haha (藤原道綱母)	Author of Kagerō nikki (The Gossamer Years)	Died 995
Minamoto no Kintada (源 公忠)	Japanese poet and one of the Thirty-six Poetry Immortals	889–948
Minamoto no Muneyuki (源 宗于)	Japanese poet	Died 939
Minamoto no Saneakira (源 信明)	Japanese poet	916–970
Minamoto no Shigeyuki (源 重之)	Japanese poet	Died c. 1000
Minamoto no Shitagō (源 順)	Japanese poet: one of the Five Men of the Pear Chamber and the Thirty-six Poetry Immortals	911–983
Vācaspati Miśra	Indian polymath	900–980
Muhammad bin Hani al Andalusi al Azdi	Poet born in Seville	Died 973
Muhammad ibn Jarir al-Tabari	Writer on theology, literature and history, born in Tabriz	839–923
Al-Muqaddasi	Arabian traveller and author of a Description of the Lands of Islam, an Arabic geography	c. 946–7 – 1000
Abdullah ibn al-Mu'tazz	Writer and, for one day, caliph of the Abbasid dynasty	Died 908
Nagavarma I	Author of the Chandōmbudhi, the first treatise on Kannada metrics	Late 10th century
Nakatsukasa (中務)	One of the Thirty-six Poetry Immortals, daughter of Lady Ise	c. 912 – after 989
Al-Nayrizi	Astronomer and meteorologist probably from Neyriz	c. 865 – c. 922
Jacob ben Nissim	Philosopher, lived in Kairouan	10th century
Nōin (能因)	Japanese poet	988–1050?
Notker Labeo	German theologian, philologist, mathematician, astronomer, connoisseur of music, and poet	c. 950 – 1022
Odo of Cluny	Author of a biography of Gerald of Aurillac, a series of moral essays, some sermons, an epic poem and 12 choral antiphons	878/9–942
Óengus mac Óengusa	Described in the Annals of the Four Masters as the "chief poet of Ireland"	Died 930
Ōnakatomi no Yorimoto (大中臣 頼基)	Japanese poet, one of the Thirty-six Poetry Immortals	Died 958
Ōnakatomi no Yoshinobu (大中臣 能宣)	Japanese poet, one of the Five Men of the Pear Chamber	922–991
Ono no Komachi (小野 小町)	Japanese poet	834–900
Ōshikōchi no Mitsune (凡河内 躬恒)	Japanese waka poet	fl. 898–922
Adikavi Pampa	Kannada-language poet	902–945
Abū Sahl al-Qūhī	Astronomer and mathematician from Tabaristan	c. 940 – c. 1000
Qusta ibn Luqa	Scholar of Greek Christian origin whose work included astronomy, mathematics, medicine and philosophy	Probably c. 820 – probably c. 912–913
Ratherius	Author of works including a criticism of the social classes of his time and two defences of his right to the Diocese of Liège	c. 887 – 974
Muhammad ibn Zakariya al-Razi	Physician, scientist, philosopher and author of alchemy and logic; born in Rey, Iran	865–925
Regino of Prüm	Chronicler and author of works on ecclesiastical discipline and liturgical singing, born in Altrip	Died 915
Richerus	Chronicler from Reims	Died after 998
Ahmad ibn Rustah	Persian author of a geographical compendium	Died after 903
Al-Saghani	Mathematician and astronomer who flourished in Turkmenistan	Died 990
Ibn Sahl	Geometer	fl. late 10th century
Sakanoue no Mochiki	Japanese poet, one of the Five Men of the Pear Chamber	fl. c. 950
Sei Shōnagon (清少納言)	Japanese diarist and poet	c. 966 – c. 1025
Abu Sulayman Sijistani	Philosopher from Sijistan	c. 932 – c. 1000
Abu Yaqub al-Sijistani	Islamic philosopher	fl. 971
Sijzi	Geometer, astrologer and astronomer, born in Sijistan	c. 945 – c. 1020
Ibrahim ibn Sinan	Geometer from Baghdad	908–946
Farrukhi Sistani	Court poet of Mahmud of Ghazni	10th–11th centuries
Somadeva Suri	South Indian Jain monk and author of the Upāsakādyayana, a central text of Digambara śrāvakācāra literature	10th century
Sosei (素性)	One of the Thirty-six Poetry Immortals	859–923
Abd al-Rahman al-Sufi	Astronomer in Iran	903–986
Sugawara no Michizane (菅原 道真/菅原 道眞)	Japanese statesman, historian and poet	845–903
Symeon the Studite	"Spiritual father" of Symeon the New Theologian and author of the "Ascetical Discourse", a narrative intended for monks	917 or 924 – c. 986–7
Ukhtanes of Sebastia	Chronicler of the history of Armenia	c. 935 – 1000
Abu'l-Hasan al-Uqlidisi	Mathematician, possibly from Damascus	c. 920 – c. 980
Vaṭeśvara	Indian mathematician	Born 802 or 880
Wang Yucheng (王禹偁)	Chinese Song dynasty poet and official	954–1001
Widukind of Corvey	Saxon historian	Died c. 1004
Xue Juzheng (薛居正)	Author of the Old History of the Five Dynasties, an account of China's Five Dynasties	912–981
Ibn Yunus	Egyptian astronomer and astrologer	950–1009
Ahmad ibn Yusuf	Egyptian mathematician	fl. c. 900–905, died 912/913
Abu al-Qasim al-Zahrawi	Physician and author of Al-Tasrif, from Al-Andalus	936–1013

== See also ==
- 10th century in poetry
- 11th century in literature
- Early Medieval literature
- Golden age of Jewish culture in Spain
- List of years in literature
