= 910s in poetry =

This article covers 910s in poetry. Nationality words link to articles with information on the nation's poetry or literature (for instance, Irish or France).

== Births ==
Death years link to the corresponding "[year] in poetry" article. There are conflicting or unreliable sources for the birth years of many people born in this period; where sources conflict, the poet is listed again and the conflict is noted:

910:

- Fujiwara no Asatada (died 966), one of the Thirty-six Poetry Immortals of Japan
- Minamoto no Saneakira (died 970), another of the Thirty-six Poetry Immortals

911:

- Minamoto no Shitagō 源順 (died 983), Japanese waka poet, scholar and nobleman; one of the Five Men of the Pear Chamber and Thirty-six Poetry Immortals of Japan; author of the Minamoto no Shitagōshū (源順集) poetry collection; some scholars claim that he also wrote the Taketori Monogatari; original compiler of the Wamyō Ruijushō, the first extant Japanese dictionary organized into semantic headings

912:

- Nakatsukasa (died 991), one of the Thirty-six Poetry Immortals of Japan and the daughter of Lady Ise

915:

- Al-Mutanabbi (died 965), Arabic poet (approximate date)
- Abu-Shakur Balkhi (died unknown), Persian poet

== Deaths ==
Birth years link to the corresponding "[year] in poetry" article:

910:

- Sosei (born 816), one of the Thirty-six Poetry Immortals of Japan
- Wei Zhuang (born 836), Chinese poet

919:

- Clement of Ohrid (born 840), Bulgarian writer and founder of the Ohrid Literary School

== See also ==
- Poetry
- 10th century in poetry
- 10th century in literature
- List of years in poetry

Other events:

- Other events of the 12th century
- Other events of the 13th century

10th century:

- 10th century in poetry
- 10th century in literature
