= List of cultural properties of Japan – paintings (Ishikawa) =

This list is of the cultural properties of Japan designated in the category of paintings (絵画, kaiga) for the Prefecture of Ishikawa.

== National Cultural Properties ==
As of 1 September 2015, eleven Important Cultural Properties have been designated, being of national significance.

Property	Date	Municipality	Ownership	Comments	Image	Dimensions	Coordinates	Ref.
Descent of Amida and Retinue, colour on silk 絹本著色阿弥陀三尊来迎図 kenpon chakushoku Amida shōju raigō zu	Heian period	Nara	Shinrensha (心蓮社) (kept at Nara National Museum)			105.7 centimetres (41.6 in) by 71.5 centimetres (28.1 in)	34°40′59″N 135°50′17″E	
Kannon Sutra, colour on silk 絹本著色観音経絵 kenpon chakushoku Kannon-kyō-e	Kamakura period	Nara	Hondo-ji (本土寺) (kept at Nara National Museum)	pair of scrolls		124 centimetres (49 in) by 90.1 centimetres (35.5 in)	34°40′59″N 135°50′17″E	
Maeda Toshiharu, colour on silk 絹本著色前田利春像 kenpon chakushoku Maeda Toshiharu	Momoyama period	Nanao	Chōrei-ji (長齢寺) (kept at Ishikawa Nanao Art Museum)			78.7 centimetres (31.0 in) by 39.4 centimetres (15.5 in)	37°02′41″N 136°57′13″E	
Kami Images from Shirayama Hime Jinja, colour on silk 絹本著色白山三社神像 kenpon chakushoku Hakusan Sansha shinzō zō	Kamakura period	Hakusan	Shirayama Hime Jinja			79.4 centimetres (31.3 in) by 42.5 centimetres (16.7 in)	36°26′06″N 136°38′11″E	
Landscape of the Four Seasons, light colour on paper, six-panel byōbu, attributed to Shūbun 紙本淡彩四季山水図〈（伝周文筆）／六曲屏風〉 shihon tansai shiki sansui zu (den-Shūbun hitsu / rokkyoku byōbu)	Muromachi period	Kanazawa	Maeda Ikutokukai (exhibition room at the Ishikawa Prefectural Museum of Art)	pair of screens			36°33′37″N 136°39′40″E	
Mibu no Tadami from the Thirty-Six Immortals of Poetry, colour on paper 紙本著色三十六歌仙切〈（忠視）／佐竹家伝来〉 shihon chakushoku sanjūrokkasen gire (Tadami / Satake-ke denrai)	Kamakura period		private	from the Satake Family Collection		36.0 centimetres (14.2 in) by 57.6 centimetres (22.7 in)		
Fujiwara no Asatada from the Thirty-Six Immortals of Poetry, colour on paper 紙本著色三十六歌仙切〈（朝忠）／佐竹家伝来〉 shihon chakushoku sanjūrokkasen gire (Asatada / Satake-ke denrai)	Kamakura period		private	from the Satake Family Collection		36.0 centimetres (14.2 in) by 57.6 centimetres (22.7 in)		
Flowers and Birds of the Four Seasons, colour on paper, six-panel byōbu, attributed to Sesshū 紙本著色四季花鳥図〈伝雪舟筆／六曲屏風〉 shihon chakushoku shiki kachō zu (den-Sesshū hitsu / rokkyoku byōbu)	Muromachi period	Kanazawa	Maeda Ikutokukai (exhibition room at the Ishikawa Prefectural Museum of Art)	pair of screens			36°33′37″N 136°39′40″E	
Cultivation in the Four Seasons, colour on paper, six-panel byōbu, by Kusumi Morikage 紙本著色四季耕作図〈久隅守景筆／六曲屏風〉 shihon chakushoku shiki kōsaku zu (Kusumi Morikage hitsu / rokkyoku byōbu)	C17	Kanazawa	Ishikawa Prefectural Museum of Art	pair of screens		79.5 centimetres (31.3 in) by 276.0 centimetres (108.7 in)	36°33′37″N 136°39′40″E	
Tengu Sōshi, ink on paper 紙本著色天狗草紙〈（園城寺巻）／〉 shihon chakushoku Tengu sōshi (Onjōji maki)	Kamakura period	Kanazawa	private (kept at Ishikawa Prefectural Museum of Art)	from Onjō-ji		29.3 centimetres (11.5 in) by 768.4 centimetres (25 ft 2.5 in)	36°33′37″N 136°39′40″E	
View of West Lake, ink on paper 紙本墨画西湖図 shihon bokuga seiko zu	1496	Kanazawa	Ishikawa Prefectural Museum of Art	with the inscription "View of West Lake in Hangzhou, produced at the Beijing Huitong-guan, on the thirteenth day of the third month of the ninth year of the Hongzhi Emperor" (杭州西湖之図、於北京会同館作此図、弘治玖年閏三月拾三日)		46.0 centimetres (18.1 in) by 84.0 centimetres (33.1 in)	36°33′37″N 136°39′40″E	

== Prefectural Cultural Properties ==
As of 14 March 2015, fifty-three properties have been designated at a prefectural level.

Property	Date	Municipality	Ownership	Comments	Image	Dimensions	Coordinates	Ref.
Nirvana painting, colour on silk, by Mubun 絹本著色涅槃図 無分筆 kenpon chakushoku nehan zu Mubun hitsu	Muromachi period	Nanao	Chōju-ji (長壽寺) (kept at Ishikawa Nanao Art Museum)			166.0 centimetres (65.4 in) by 115.0 centimetres (3 ft 9.3 in)	37°02′41″N 136°57′13″E	

== See also ==
- Cultural Properties of Japan
- List of National Treasures of Japan (paintings)
- Japanese painting
- List of Historic Sites of Japan (Ishikawa)
