= 990s in poetry =

Nationality words link to articles with information on the nation's poetry or literature (for instance, Irish or France).

== Events ==
991:

- The Battle of Maldon takes place, later celebrated in the Anglo-Saxon poem The Battle of Maldon

== Births ==
Death years link to the corresponding "[year] in poetry" article. There are conflicting or unreliable sources for the birth years of many people born in this period; where sources conflict, the poet is listed again and the conflict is noted:

993:

- Samuel ibn Naghrela (died 1056), Jewish poet in Al-Andalus

== Deaths ==
Birth years link to the corresponding "[year] in poetry" article:

990:

- Dunash ben Labrat (born 920), Jewish poet in Al-Andalus (approximate date)
- Kiyohara no Motosuke (born 908), one of the Thirty-six Poetry Immortals of Japan

991:

- Ōnakatomi no Yoshinobu (born 921), one of the Thirty-six Poetry Immortals of Japan
- Taira no Kanemori (born unknown), another of the Thirty-six Poetry Immortals
- Nakatsukasa (born 912), another of the Thirty-six Poetry Immortals

992:

- Fujiwara no Nakafumi (born 923), one of the Thirty-six Poetry Immortals of Japan

994:

- Fujiwara no Takamitsu (born 939), Heian period waka poet and Japanese nobleman

== See also ==
- Poetry
- 10th century in poetry
- 10th century in literature
- List of years in poetry

Other events:

- Other events of the 12th century
- Other events of the 13th century

10th century:

- 10th century in poetry
- 10th century in literature
