= 930s in poetry =

This article covers 930s in poetry. Nationality words link to articles with information on the nation's poetry or literature (for instance, Irish or France).

== Works published ==
- Tosa Nikki by Ki no Tsurayuki. Poetic diary depicting a journey from Tosa Province to Kyoto in this year.

== Births ==
Death years link to the corresponding "[year] in poetry" article. There are conflicting or unreliable sources for the birth years of many people born in this period; where sources conflict, the poet is listed again and the conflict is noted:

932:

- Abu Firas al-Hamdani (died 968), Arab poet

935:

- Eochaid ua Flannacáin (died 1004), Irish cleric and poet
- Hrotsvitha (died 1002), canoness and Latin language poet and dramatist from Saxony
- 'Fujiwara no Michitsuna no haha' (藤原道綱母, "Fujiwara clan's Michitsuna's mother") (died 995), Japanese woman waka poet

936:

- Li Houzhu, born 936 or 937 (died 978), Song dynasty Chinese poet

939:

- Sri Ponna (died 968), writing in the Kannada language
- Fujiwara no Takamitsu (died 994), Heian period Japanese waka poet and nobleman

== Deaths ==
Birth years link to the corresponding "[year] in poetry" article:

932:

- Fujiwara no Sadakata (born 873), Japanese poet

933:

- Fujiwara no Kanesuke (born 877), Japanese poet, one of the Thirty-six Poetry Immortals

934:

- Ibn Duraid (born 837), Arab poet and philologist

938:

- Lady Ise (born 875), prominent Japanese woman waka poet

== See also ==
- Poetry
- 10th century in poetry
- 10th century in literature
- List of years in poetry

Other events:

- Other events of the 12th century
- Other events of the 13th century

10th century:

- 10th century in poetry
- 10th century in literature
