= 950s in poetry =

This article covers 950s in poetry. Nationality words link to articles with information on the nation's poetry or literature (for instance, Irish or France).

== Events ==
951:

- Compilation of the Gosen Wakashū, a Japanese imperial poetry anthology, begins by order of Emperor Murakami

== Births ==
Death years link to the corresponding "[year] in poetry" article. There are conflicting or unreliable sources for the birth years of many people born in this period; where sources conflict, the poet is listed again and the conflict is noted:

954:

- Wang Yucheng (died 1001), Song

956:

- Akazome Emon 赤染衛門 (died 1041), Japanese waka poet who lived in the mid-Heian period; a member of both the Thirty-six Elder Poetic Sages and Fujiwara no Kintō's 36 female poetry immortals (or "sages") of the Kamakura period (surname: Akazome)

== Deaths ==
Birth years link to the corresponding "[year] in poetry" article:

958:

- Ōnakatomi no Yorimoto (born 886), one of the Thirty-six Poetry Immortals of Japan

== See also ==
- Poetry
- 10th century in poetry
- 10th century in literature
- List of years in poetry

Other events:

- Other events of the 10th century
- Other events of the 11th century

10th century:

- 10th century in poetry
- 10th century in literature
