= 920s in poetry =

This article covers 920s in poetry. Nationality words link to articles with information on the nation's poetry or literature (for instance, Irish or France).

== Works published ==
920:

- Waltharius, a Latin poem founded on German popular tradition, which relates the exploits of the west Gothic hero Walter of Aquitaine

== Births ==
Death years link to the corresponding "[year] in poetry" article. There are conflicting or unreliable sources for the birth years of many people born in this period; where sources conflict, the poet is listed again and the conflict is noted:

920:

- Dunash ben Labrat (died 990), Jewish poet in Al-Andalus (approximate date)

921:

- Ōnakatomi no Yoshinobu (died 991), one of the Thirty-six Poetry Immortals of Japan

923:

- Fujiwara no Nakafumi (died 992), one of the Thirty-six Poetry Immortals of Japan

925:

- Ferdowsi حکیم ابوالقاسم فردوسی توسی (died 1020), Persian

929:

- Kishi Joō (died 985), one of the Thirty-six Poetry Immortals and an early Japanese woman poet

== Deaths ==
Birth years link to the corresponding "[year] in poetry" article:

920:

- Mibu no Tadamine (born unknown), Japanese waka poet

922:

- March 26: Mansur Al-Hallaj (born 858), Persian mystic, revolutionary writer, poet and pious teacher of Sufism; most famous for his apparent, but disputed, self-proclaimed divinity
- Oshikochi Mitsune (born 898), Japanese waka poet and one of the Thirty-six Poetry Immortals

925:

- Vasugupta (born 860), writer of the Shiva Sutras of Vasugupta

== See also ==
- Poetry
- 10th century in poetry
- 10th century in literature
- List of years in poetry

Other events:

- Other events of the 12th century
- Other events of the 13th century

10th century:

- 10th century in poetry
- 10th century in literature
