= 960s in poetry =

This article covers 960s in poetry. Nationality words link to articles with information on the nation's poetry or literature (for instance, Irish or France).

== Births ==
Death years link to the corresponding "[year] in poetry" article. There are conflicting or unreliable sources for the birth years of many people born in this period; where sources conflict, the poet is listed again and the conflict is noted:

966:

- Fujiwara no Kintō (died 1041), Japanese poet, publisher of the Shūi Wakashū; he created the concept of the Thirty-six Poetry Immortals
- Sei Shōnagon (died 1017), author of The Pillow Book

967:

- December 7 – Abū-Sa'īd Abul-Khayr (died 1049), Persian poet
- Badi' al-Zaman al-Hamadhani (died 1007), Arab poet

== Deaths ==
Birth years link to the corresponding "[year] in poetry" article:

965:

- September 23 – Ahmad ibn-al-Husayn al-Mutanabbi (born 915), Arab (Iraqi-born) poet

966:

- Fujiwara no Asatada (born 910), one of the Thirty-six Poetry Immortals of Japan
- Sri Ponna (born 939), writing in the Kannada language

967:

- Abu al-Faraj al-Isfahani (born 897), Iranian scholar of Arab-Quraysh origin who is noted for collecting and preserving ancient Arabic lyrics and poems in his major work, the Kitāb al-Aghānī

968:

- Abu Firas al-Hamdani (born 935), Arab poet

== See also ==
- Poetry
- 10th century in poetry
- 10th century in literature
- List of years in poetry

Other events:

- Other events of the 12th century
- Other events of the 13th century

10th century:

- 10th century in poetry
- 10th century in literature
