= 970s in poetry =

This article covers 970s in poetry. Nationality words link to articles with information on the nation's poetry or literature (for instance, Irish or France).

== Births ==
Death years link to the corresponding "[year] in poetry" article. There are conflicting or unreliable sources for the birth years of many people born in this period; where sources conflict, the poet is listed again and the conflict is noted:

973:

- Dec. 26: Al-Ma'arri (died 1057), blind Arab philosopher, poet and writer
- Murasaki Shikibu (died 1014 or (died 1025)), Japanese woman poet

== Deaths ==
Birth years link to the corresponding "[year] in poetry" article:

970:

- Minamoto no Saneakira (born 910), one of the Thirty-six Poetry Immortals of Japan

973:

- Hrotsvitha (born 935), Latin language poet and dramatist from Saxony

975:

- Adikavi Pampa (born 902), writing in Kannada language

978:

- Li Houzhu (born 936), Southern Tang and Song poet

== See also ==
- Poetry
- 10th century in poetry
- 10th century in literature
- List of years in poetry

Other events:

- Other events of the 12th century
- Other events of the 13th century

10th century:

- 10th century in poetry
- 10th century in literature
