= Nagavarma =

Nagavarma may refer to:

- Nagavarma I, (c. 990) noted Jain writer and poet in the Kannada language, author of Karnataka Kadambari and Chandombudhi
- Nagavarma II, Kannada language scholar and grammarian of the 11th or 12th century Western Chalukya court centred in Basavakalyan
