= Ishikawa Nanao Art Museum =

- 石川県七尾美術館
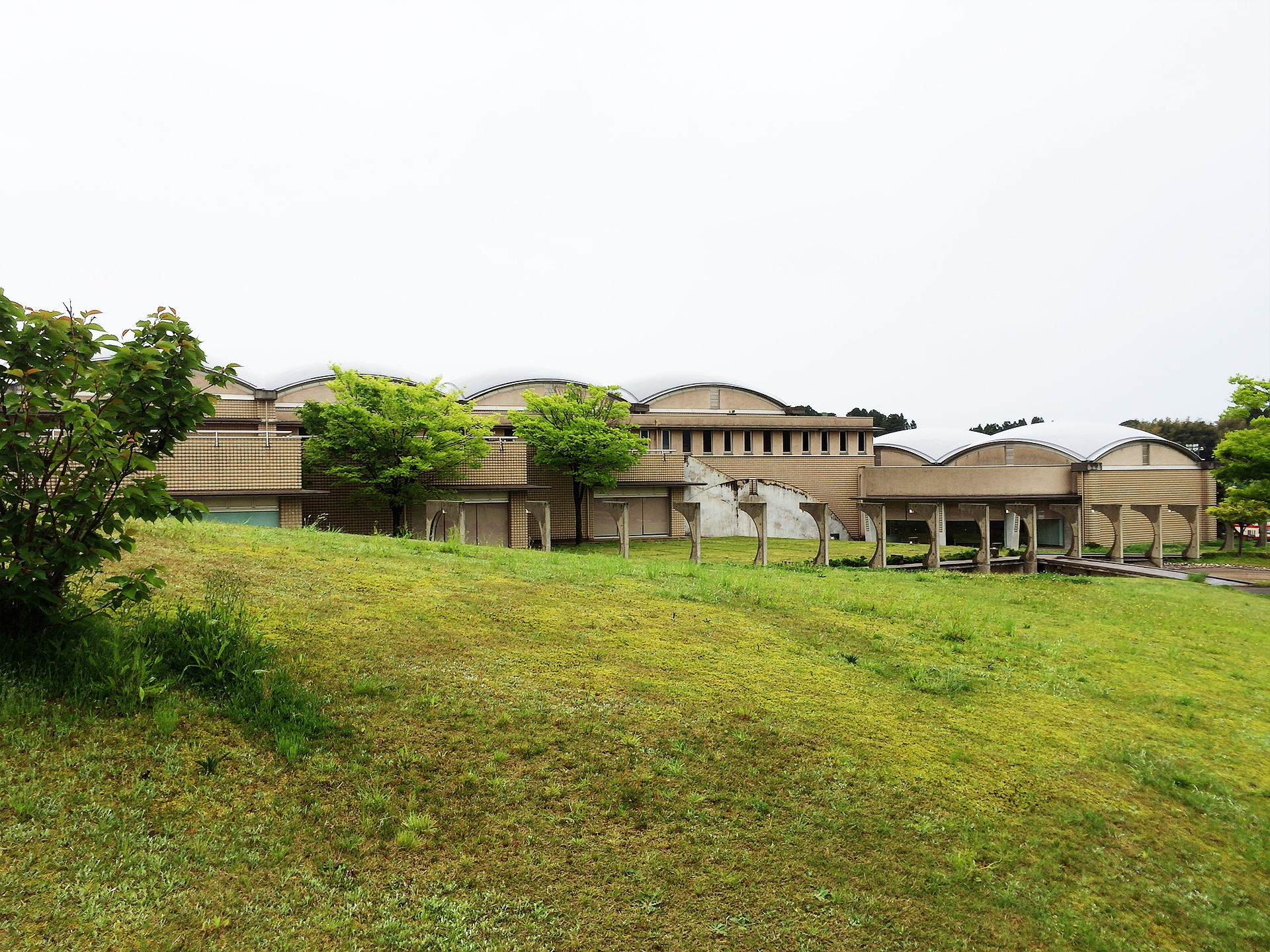
- Interactive map of the Ishikawa Nanao Art Museum area

General information
- Location: 1-1 Komurayamadai, Nanao, Ishikawa Prefecture, Japan
- Coordinates: 37°02′41″N 136°57′13″E
- Opened: 28 April 1995

Technical details
- Floor count: 2
- Floor area: 3,050 m^{2}

Website
- nanao-art-museum.jp

Ishikawa Nanao Art Museum (石川県七尾美術館, Ishikawa Nanao bijutsukan) opened in 1995 in Nanao, Ishikawa Prefecture, Japan. The main art gallery on the Noto Peninsula, the collection includes works by Hasegawa Tōhaku.

== See also ==
- Ishikawa Prefectural Museum of Art
- List of Cultural Properties of Japan - paintings (Ishikawa)
