= 980s in poetry =

This article covers 980s in poetry. Nationality words link to articles with information on the nation's poetry or literature (for instance, Irish or France).

== Births ==
Death years link to the corresponding "[year] in poetry" article. There are conflicting or unreliable sources for the birth years of many people born in this period; where sources conflict, the poet is listed again and the conflict is noted: 983:

- Gunnlaugr ormstunga (died 1008), Icelandic skald

987:

- Liu Yong (died 1053), Song

== Deaths ==
Birth years link to the corresponding "[year] in poetry" article:

983:

- Minamoto no Shitagō 源順 (born 911), Japanese waka poet, scholar and nobleman; one of the Five Men of the Pear Chamber and Thirty-six Poetry Immortals of Japan; author of the Minamoto no Shitagōshū (源順集) poetry collection; some scholars claim that he also wrote the Taketori Monogatari; original compiler of the Wamyō Ruijushō, the first extant Japanese dictionary organized into semantic headings

985:

- Kishi Joō 徽子女王 (born 929), Japanese waka poet and noblewoman; one of the Thirty-six Poetry Immortals

== See also ==
- Poetry
- 10th century in poetry
- 10th century in literature
- List of years in poetry

Other events:

- Other events of the 12th century
- Other events of the 13th century

10th century:

- 10th century in poetry
- 10th century in literature
