= Xingchang =

Chinese Pure Land Buddhist master of the Song dynasty

Zhaoqing Xingchang (昭慶省常, 959–1020, also romanized Shěngcháng) was a Chinese Buddhist monk during the Song dynasty who is considered to the a patriarch of the Chinese Pure Land tradition. Xingchang founded the first Pure Land society of the Song era, which became a model for later Pure Land societies.

== Overview ==
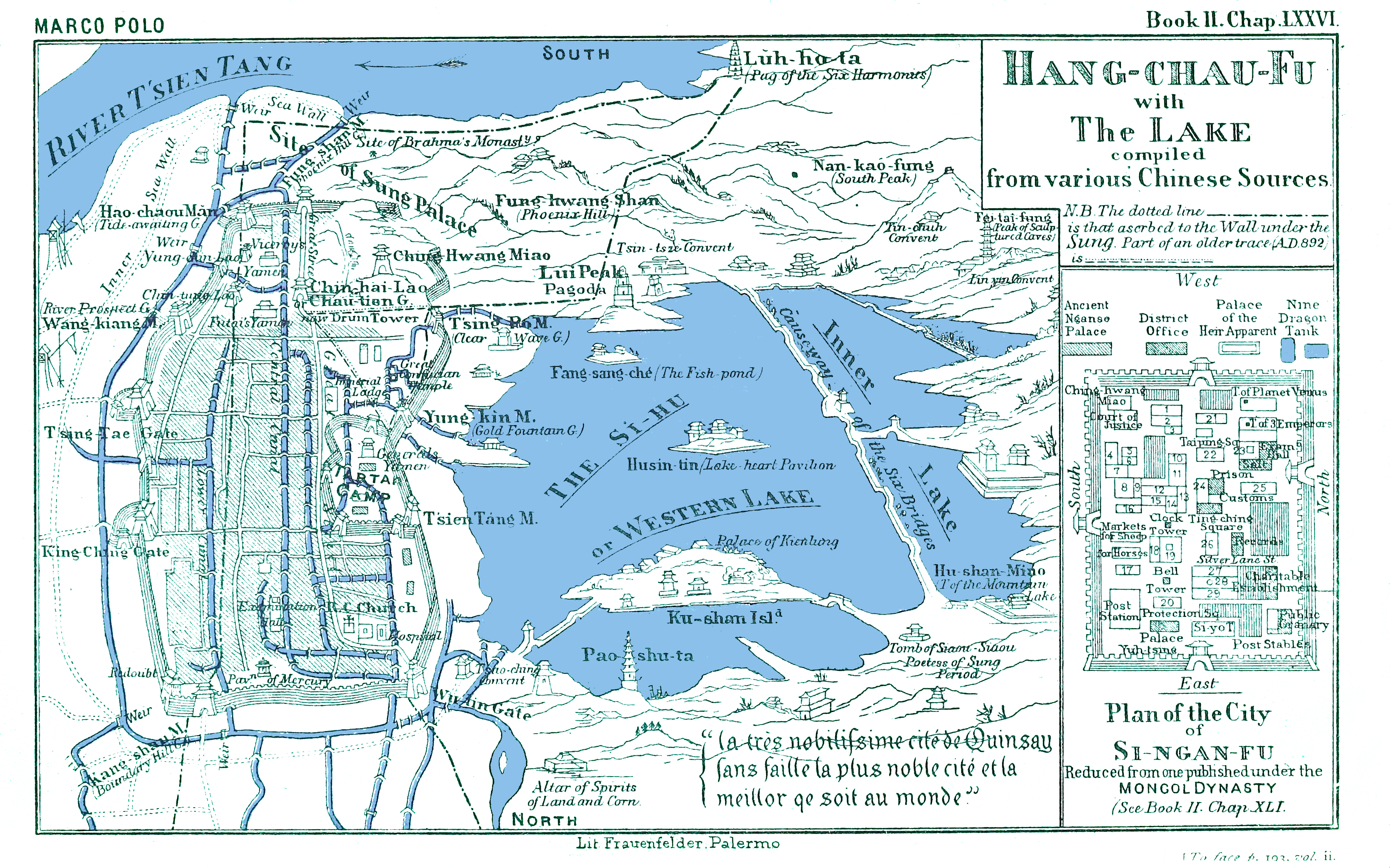
A map of Zhejiang's West Lake region

Xingchang was born in 959 C.E. in Zhejiang Province, in Quantang (present Hangzhou). He became a monk at seven and received the full precepts at seventeen. He was learned in the Mahayana scriptures and in the calming and contemplation practice of Tiantai Buddhism and also admired the Pure Land teachings of Lushan Huiyuan who had formed a society of devoted practitioners. Xingchang therefore formed a Pure Land Lotus society in 990 at Hangzhou's Zhaoqing Monastery. This "Pure Practices Society" (Jingxing she 淨行社), also known as the West Lake Lotus Society, was based on the Avatamsaka Sutra's chapter on pure practice and on the practice of nianfo. His society included several prominent literati and officials from the capital along with elites from around the Jiangnan region. They included poet Wang Yucheng (954–1001) and scholar Su Yijian.

The establishment of the society is discussed in the Fozu tongji (fascicle forty-three) which states:

The śramaṇa Xingchang 省常 (959–1020) of Zhaoqing si 昭慶寺 in Xihu 西湖 of Hangzhou, copied out with his own blood the “Chapter on Pure Conduct” of the Huayan jing. He formed a society to carry out Pure Land practices. Prime Minister Wang Dan 王旦 (957–1017) acted as chief. One hundred and thirty-two gentlemen, including vice Councillor Su Yijian 蘇易簡 (958–997), were at one time all called disciples of the Pure Land Society. A thousand bhikṣus participated. It was said that even the Lotus Society of Mount Lu had never been so glorious as this day.

Song Bai's (933–1009) Da Song Hangzhou Xihu Zhaoqing si jieshe beiming bing xu 大宋杭州西湖昭慶寺結社碑銘並序 (Inscription and Preface for the Fellowship Founding at Zhaoqing si of West Lake in Hangzhou during the Great Song) also reports that Master Xingchang copied out the Jingxing pin 淨行品 (Chapter on Pure Conduct) of the Avatamsaka with ink mixed with his own blood, prostrating, circumambulating a shrine, and reciting the Buddha's name thrice for each character written. He also had a thousand copies of the text printed and distributed among his followers. During the society's dedication ceremony, Xingchang led eighty monks and a thousand lay followers in reciting the following vow:

Starting today, we set forth the vow to initiate our bodhi-minds, and to cultivate the bodhisattva path forever. We wish, at the end of our present life, to be reborn into Sukhavati where we would suddenly enter into the dharmadhatu and be perfectly enlightened to non-origination. We would cultivate the ten kinds of paramitas, and be close to innumerable kalyanamitra. The glow of our bodies would pervasively illuminate to assist sentient beings in attaining their nianfo samadhi. . . . Today we make this vow for all sentient beings. Because there are innumerable sentient beings, our vow is thus great!

The Anthology on Organizing the Lotus Society at Zhaoqing Temple at West Lake in Hangzhou (杭州西湖昭慶寺結蓮社集) contains various sources on the teachings and activities of Master Xingchang's Lotus Society.

Master Xingchang compiled the Xihu jingshe lu 西湖淨社錄 (Record of the Pure Land Society of West Lake), but it is no longer extant.
