= Chandas (poetry) =

Meter

Metrical poetry in Sanskrit is called Chandas (Sanskrit: छन्दस्) or Chandas/Chandassu (Kannada: ಛಂದಸ್ಸು) and Chandassu (Telugu: ఛందస్సు). The term Chandas (Sanskrit: छन्दः/छन्दस्, romanized: chandaḥ/chandas (singular), Sanskrit: छन्दांसि, romanized: chandāṃsi (plural)) means "pleasing, alluring, lovely, delightful, or charming", and is based on the root chad, which means "esteemed to please, to seem good, feel pleasant, and/or something that nourishes, gratifies, or is celebrated". Chandas refers to the Vedas themselves. Krishna refers to the Vedas as leaves of the tree of creation. Vedas being in verse-form (Chandas), also came to be known as Chandas. The term also refers to "any metrical part of the Vedas or other composition". Prose and poetry follows the rules of Chandas to design the structural features of 'poetry'. Chhandas is a definable aspect of many definable and indefinable aspects of poetry. Chhandas generates rhythm to the literature when the rules are properly followed. Rhythm is important to literature as a preliminary attraction.

== Construction of Chandas ==
=== In Telugu ===
In Telugu, 'Chandas' is constructed based on the number of akṣara (roughly syllables) in each line (also called pādam) of a poem.

As the same lines are repeated (āvṛtta), these are called vṛttā. If all the lines in a poem follow the same 'types of akṣarās', it is called a 'sama Vrutta'.

There are separate Telugu equivalents for the English words 'letter' and 'syllable'. The first one is namu (letter). This is the basic 'letter' of the Telugu in the alphabets, and is called varṇa-samāmnāya. There are 56 varṇa-samāmnāya in Telugu.

The equivalent for 'syllable' in Telugu is akṣaramu. 'Syllable' is often defined as the 'unit of pronunciation at a stretch' with a collection of letters (Nās) in it.

For example, in a word like svapnamu, sva is an akṣaramu (syllable), but not a namu (letter) as it has two nās (sa and va) in it.

These akṣara are divided into laghuvu (light) and guruvu (heavy) based on the time period of pronunciation. These akṣara are the fundamental aspects in constructing chandas in Telugu.

Meters of the same length are distinguished by the pattern of laghuvu ("light") and guruvu ("heavy") syllables in the pādam.

Pattern of laghuvu and guruvu in a sequence of three is called Gaṇam (group). The word ya-mā-tā-rā-ja-bhā-na-sa-la-gam is called Gana Suchi. The Ganas are the same as Sanskrit Chandas.

- guruvu-laghuvu-laghuvu = bha-ganam
- laghuvu-guruvu-laghuvu = ja-ganam
- laghuvu-laghuvu-guruvu = sa-ganam
- laghuvu-guruvu-guruvu = ya-ganam
- guruvu-laghuvu-guruvu = ra-ganam
- guruvu-guruvu-laghuvu= ta-ganam
- guruvu-guruvu-guruvu = ma-ganam
- laghuvu-laghuvu-laghuvu = na-ganam

These Ganam(s) are divided into three major categories:

- Surya Ganam
- Indra Ganam
- Chandra Ganam

==== Types of Chandas ====
Based on categories of Ganam(s), Telugu poetry is classified as

- Jāti
- Upajāti
- Vṛttam or Vṛtta

Upajāti only has yati (caesura) but no prāsa (rhythm) where as Jāti and Vṛttā contain both yati and prasā.

There are 26 types of chandas. Each chandas is recognized by the number of akṣarā present in each line of the poem. As an ‘’akṣara’’ can be either a ‘’laghuvu’’ or a ‘'guruvu'’, the number of variations possible in each type of 'chandas' follows a 'binary system'. The names and numbers of '’chandas'’ and the numbers of ‘'sama vṛttā'’ that can be generated in each variety are as follows:

# of chandas	Name	No. of letters per line	# of sama vṛttam possible
1	Ukta	1	2
2	atyukta	2	4
3	Madhya	3	8
4	pratisṭha	4	16
5	suprstisṭha	5	32
6	gāyatri	6	64
7	uṣṭikku	7	128
8	anusṭhuppu	8	256
9	bṛhati	9	512
10	paṃkti	10	1,024
11	triṣṭuppu	11	2,048
12	jagati	12	4,096
13	atijagati	13	8,192
14	Sakvari	14	16,384
15	atiṣakvari	15	32,768
16	ashṭi	16	65,536
17	atyashṭi	17	131,072
18	dhṛti	18	262,144
19	atidhṛti	19	524,288
20	kṛti	20	1,048,576
21	prakṛti	21	2,097,152
22	ākṛti	22	4,194,304
23	vikṛti	23	8,388,608
24	sukṛti	24	16,777,216
25	abhikṛti	25	33,554,432
26	utkṛti	26	67,108,864

The total number of sama vṛtta in 26 chandassus is 134,217,726.

=== In Kannada ===
The poetical works of Old Kannada and Middle Kannada followed the rules of Chandas given by Nagavarma I in the book Chandombudhi. Kannada prosody is classified into three parts:

1. Prāsa (ಪ್ರಾಸ)
2. Yati (ಯತಿ)
3. Gana (ಗಣ)

==== Prāsa ====
Prāsa, or the rhyme scheme, refers to the same consonant repeating periodically in each line. There are two types:

- Ādi Prāsa: Rhyming of consonants at the beginning of a line
- Antya Prāsa: Rhyming of consonants at the end of a line.

==== Yati ====
While reading poetry, to breathe, readers paused at places in the text. These places were called Yati. However, the usage of 'Yati' is uncommon in Kannada literature.

==== Gana ====
Gana refers to a group. In Kannada prosody, Gana refers to the group of the syllables, letters, or units. There are three types:

- Mātra Gana: Gana classified on the basis of the syllables.
- Akṣara Gana: Classified on the basis of letters.
- Ansha Gana: Classified on the basis of units or parts of the poem. Brahma, Vishnu and Rudra are the three types of Ansha Gana.

=== Mātrā Gana ===
One mātrā means the time taken to pronounce a letter. Thus the gana classified on this basis is called Mātrā Gana. While classifying, the ganas are made of 3, 4 or 5 syllables.

There are two types of syllables in Sanskrit prasody:

- Laghu: A short syllable (based on time duration to pronounce). It is denoted by the symbol 'U'.
- Guru: A long syllable (based on time duration to pronounce). It is denoted by the symbol '-'.

==== A letter becomes Guru when it has following features ====
- Long vowels (dīrgha svara)
- A letter preceding the combined letter (digraphs)
- Letter combined with anusvara or visarga
- Consonantal letter
- Diphthongs
- Last letter of third and sixth line of Śatpadi

A letter is considered as Laghu when it does not have the above features.

=== Types of Kannada Chandassu ===
1. Kanda (ಕಂದ ಪದ್ಯ)
2. Shatpadi (ಷಟ್ಪದಿ)
3. Ragaḷe (ರಗಳೆ)

==== Kanda Poem ====
A kanda poem is a special type of Kannada prosody. The poem has four lines, where the first and third lines and the second and fourth lines have same number of mātras. Each Gana used in kanda poem has four mātras.

==== Śatpadi ====
A śatpadi is a poem that has six lines. The first, second, fourth, and fifth lines have equal numbers of mātras and third and sixth lines have same number of mātras. Each Gana used in śatpadi may have 3, 4, or 5 mātras.

There are six types of śatpadi. Each type has different rules, features and characteristics. The types are: Śara (ಶರ), Kusuma (ಕುಸುಮ), Bhoga (ಭೋಗ), Bhāmini (ಭಾಮಿನಿ), Parivardhini (ಪರಿವರ್ಧಿನಿ), and Vārdhaka (ವಾರ್ಧಕ).

==== Ragaḷe ====
A ragaḷe is a poem that has many lines. All lines have equal number of mātras. There are three types of ragaḷe: Utsāha (ಉತ್ಸಾಹ), Mandanila (ಮಂದಾನಿಲ), and Lalita (ಲಲಿತ).

=== Akṣara Gana ===
Gana classified on the basis of letters or characters is known as Akṣara Gana. The Akṣara ganas are made of three letters or characters. A formula-sentence is used for this: ya-mā-tā-rā-ja-bhā-na-sa-la-gam (ಯಮಾತಾರಾಜಭಾನಸಲಗಂ).

Thus we get eight akshara ganas by this. The ganas are same as in Sanskrit Chandas. The ganas are

- ya-gaṇa: ya-mā-tā = U – –
- ma-gaṇa: mā-tā-rā = – – –
- ta-gaṇa: tā-rā-ja = – – U
- ra-gaṇa: rā-ja-bhā = – U –
- ja-gaṇa: ja-bhā-na = U – U
- bha-gaṇa: bhā-na-sa = – U U
- na-gaṇa: na-sa-la = U U U
- sa-gaṇa: sa-la-gā = U U –

==== Vṛttas ====
The poems written on the basis of Akṣara gana are known as Vṛttas. In Kannada Chandassu there are six types of Vṛttas:

1. Utpala Mālā (ಉತ್ಪಲಮಾಲಾ ವೃತ್ತ)
2. Champaka Mālā (ಚಂಪಕಮಾಲಾ ವೃತ್ತ)
3. Shārdūla Vikrīdita (ಶಾರ್ದೂಲ ವಿಕ್ರೀಡಿತ ವೃತ್ತ)
4. Mattebha Vikrīdita (ಮತ್ತೇಭ ವಿಕ್ರೀಡಿತ ವೃತ್ತ)
5. Sragdharā (ಸ್ರಗ್ಧರಾ ವೃತ್ತ)
6. Mahā Sragdharā (ಮಹಾ ಸ್ರಗ್ಧರಾ ವೃತ್ತ)

== See also ==
- Kannada Language
- Telugu language
- Kannada literature
- Telugu literature
- Kannada and Telugu people
- Satavahana Dynasty
- Sanskrit grammar
- Sanskrit pronouns and determiners
- Chandam - A Complete Software for Telugu Chandassu.
