= Yōrō Shrine =

Shinto shrine in Gifu Prefecture, Japan

Yōrō Shrine 養老神社
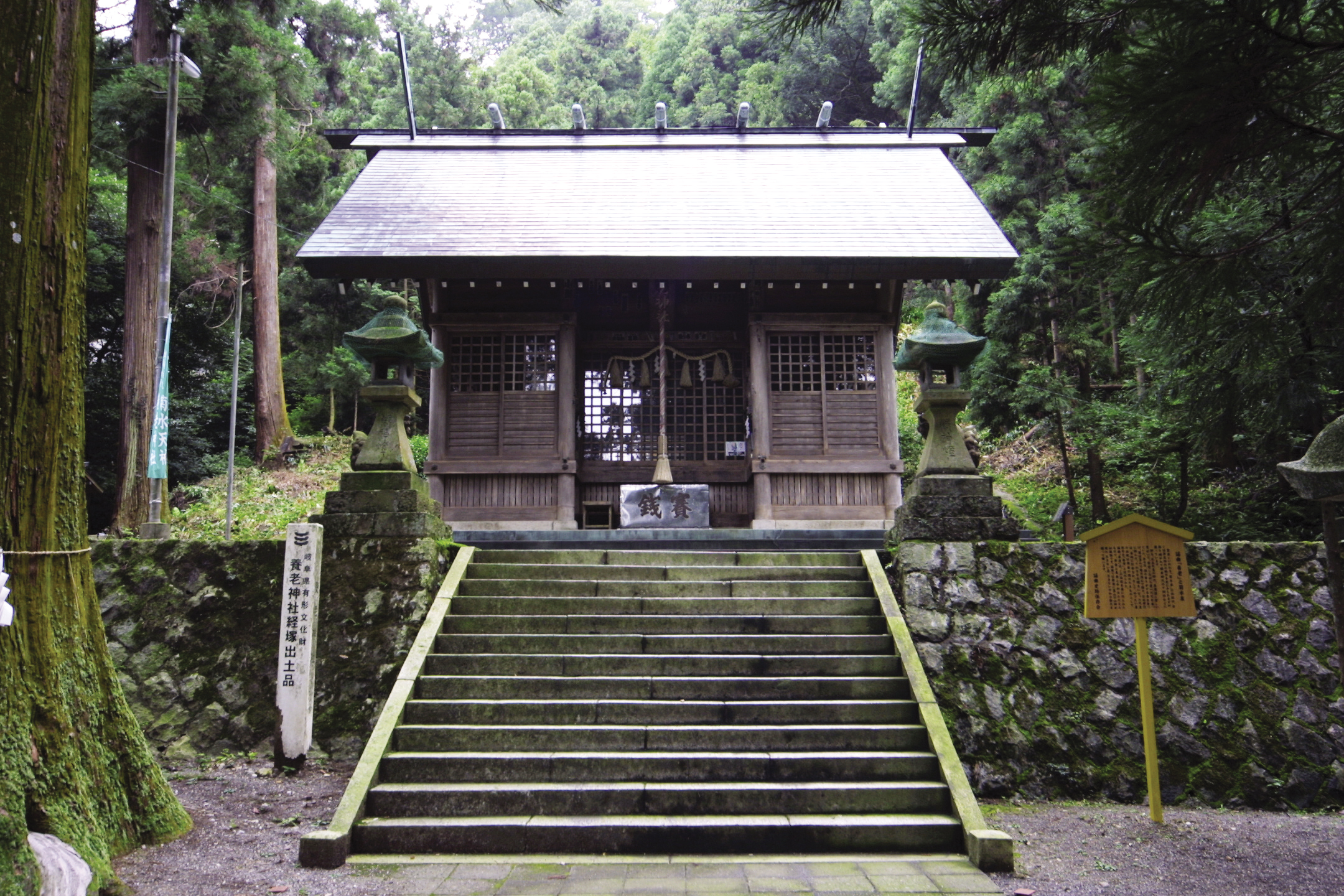

- Location within Japan

Religion
- Affiliation: Shinto
- Deity: Kikurihime no Kami; Sugawara no Michizane; Empress Genshō; Emperor Shōmu

Location
- Location: Yōrō Park, Yōrō; Gifu, Japan
- Interactive map of Yōrō Shrine 養老神社
- Coordinates: 35°16′56.85″N 136°32′20.20″E

Architecture
- Established: unknown

Yōrō Shrine (養老神社, Yōrō Jinja) is a Shinto shrine located in the town of Yōrō in Yōrō District, Gifu Prefecture, Japan.

== History ==
The actual year of construction is unknown, but it is thought that it was built during the Yōrō era of the Nara period. The shrine's existence was recorded during the Heian period, but it was referred to as "Yōrō Myōjin" (養老明神).

In 1504, its name was changed to "Yōrō Tenjin" (養老天神). "Yōrō Shrine" did not become the official name until the start of the Meiji period a few centuries later.

== See also ==
- List of Shinto shrines
