= Kikurihime =

Japanese Shinto goddess

Kikurihime-no-Kami
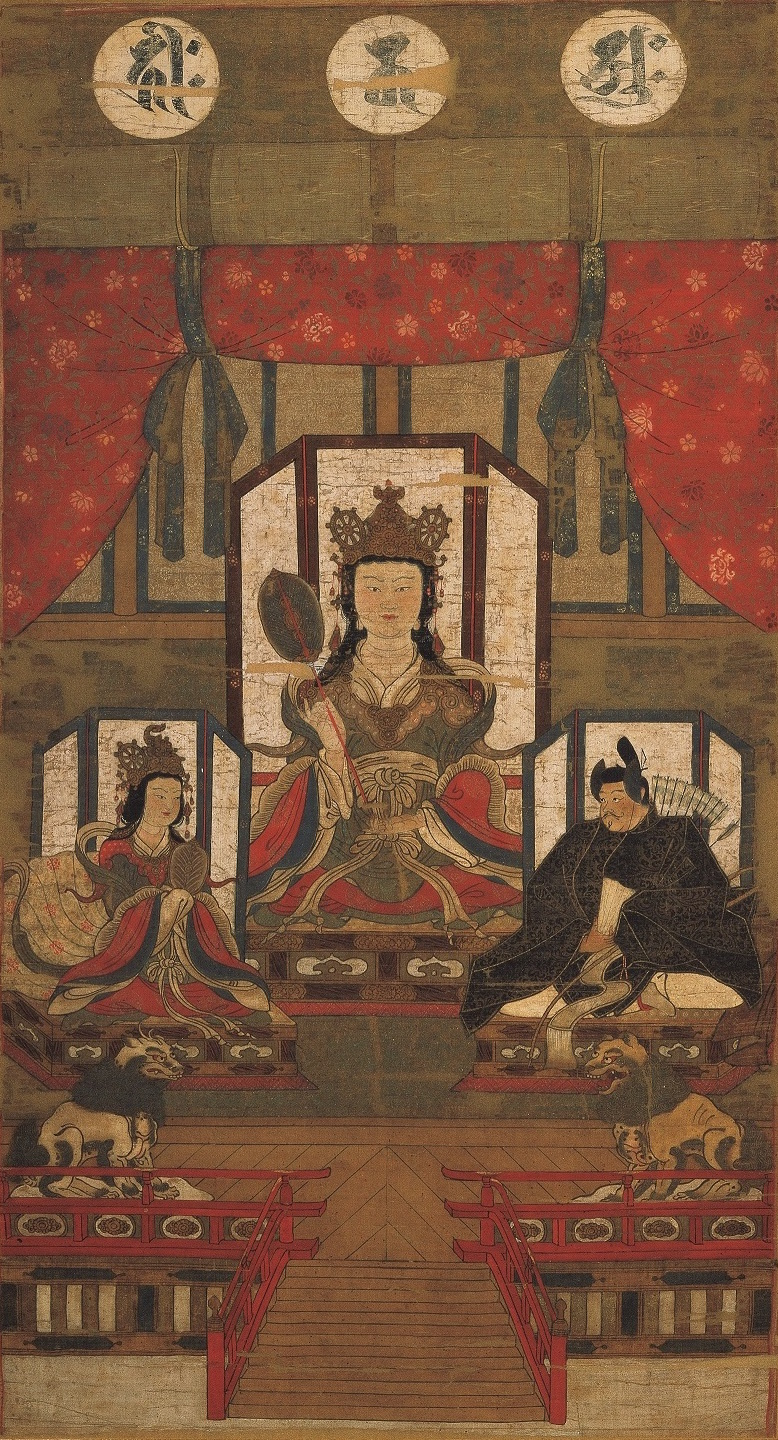
- Other names: Kikurihime-no-Mikoto (菊理媛命); Kikurihime; Shirayama-Hime (白山比咩); Shirayama Hime no Kami (しらやまひめのかみ); Hakusan (白山)
- Japanese: 菊理媛神
- Major cult center: Shirayama Hime Shrine
- Texts: Nihon Shoki (Nihongi)
- Gender: Female
- Region: Japan
- Festivals: Hakusan Festival

Kikurihime no Kami (菊理媛神), also Kikurihime no Mikoto (菊理媛命), is a Japanese Shinto goddess venerated as Shirayama Hime (白山比咩) (also known as Shirayama Hime no Kami (しらやまひめのかみ)) at Shirayama Hime Shrine in Hakusan, Ishikawa Prefecture. She is equated with the mountain Hakusan (白山) in Ishikawa province at Hakusanhime shrine. She is mentioned in the Nihongi (Nihon Shoki), but not in the Kojiki. She mediated between Izanagi and Izanami after the former escaped from the land of the dead, Yomi no Kuni. She is also venerated at Yasukuni Shrine in Tokyo and at Yōrō Shrine in Gifu Prefecture. Kikuri appears very briefly during the myth of Yomi, after Izanagi used the great god Michikaeshi Ōkami to block the entry to Yomi no kuni. Her words are praised by Izanagi, but what she said to him was not recorded (or erased), despite Kikurihime's popularity as demonstrated by her worship at 3,000 shrines across Japan. She was later merged with Kannon Bosatsu following Shinbutsu-shūgō ideas.
