= Malliya Rechana =

Malliya Rechana was n 10th-century Indian poet and writer in the Telugu language. He hails from the present-day Vemulawada, Telangana region of India. He wrote the first Telugu prosody (chandassu) book called Kavijanasrayam.

The most antique reference to Malliya Rechana is 11th-century Tamil literature 'Yaappirungulam Kaarikai' mentioning the Kavi "Renchi kouyaaruseyida vaduga chandamu".

"For the well being of the stainless rules of (Peosy) the sweet poet Mallia Recan (Worthy of the favour of bolds) hath composed in the Telugu language this admirable prosody entitled the Refuge Of Poets -" C.P. Brown

== Early life ==
Malliya Rechana was a Jain Komati from a place near Vemulawada, Karimnagar district of Telangana. Rechana was born to father "Bhima" and mother "Mallamma".

"He from Nizam Rashram and his father is Malliya"."There are a lot of Jain Komatis in Karimnagar region even till this day(1917)"."Scholars uniformly agree that Kavijanasrayam's author is associated with Vemulawada"

Vemulawada was the seat of Jain literature. The book Kavijanasrayam establishes the contributions of Jain Literature to Telugu. Chalukyas of Vemulavada, the local rulers, were great patrons of Kannada Jain literature. Along with Kannada, we could see that an attempt was made in the same direction for Telugu Jain literature.

P. V. P Sastry also mentions that 'many Jain works got destroyed'.

== Contemporaries ==
Malliya Rechana, Pampa, Jina Vallabha, Somadeva Suri are considered contemporaries.

Malliya Rechana's guru is Vaadindra Chudamani. Pampa's guru is Jinendrudu. Rechana refers to "Madanavilasa", "Vachakabharana", "Jinendra" which are all associated to the inscriptions of Vemulawada, Telangana.

== Literary career ==
He wrote the first Telugu prosody (chandassu) book called Kavijanasrayam.

"Nannayya’s Mahabharata shows highly developed technique of Telugu. It presupposes fairly long period of development. Even earlier to Nannayya there may have been Telugu works but which are not extant today. Very recently, P.V.P P Sastry is of the opinion that Malliya Rechana's Kavi Janasrayamu now dated to 12th Gent. A.D. shows archaic Telugu language and it must be dated to 950-980 A.D. He points out that Malliya Rechana in the work refers to one Vachakabharana who helped him to write the work. Vachakabharana as pointed by P.V .P PS astry is none other than Jinavallabha, brother of Pampa, of Kurikyala inscription datable to C.950 A.D. Hence, in his opinion Malliya Rechana' s Kavi Janasrayamu is datable to G.950 A.d. not to 13th Cent. A.D. If his suggestion is accepted, then it is likely that Telugu literary activities also started simultaneously with Kannada literature."
