= Hákonardrápa =

Hákonardrápa ("drápa of Hákon") is the name of several skaldic poems.

Guthormr sindri's Hákonardrápa was composed in the 10th century in the honour of King Hákon the Good of Norway.

Other drápur, written later in the 10th century, praise the Norwegian jarl Hákon Sigurðarson. They were composed by Einarr skálaglamm, Hallfreðr vandræðaskáld, Tindr Hallkelsson and Þórleifr jarlsskáld Rauðfeldarson. Only one stanza and a few verses of Þórleifr's work on Hákon survived. The stanza (preserved in Snorri Sturluson's Óláfs saga Tryggvasonar) especially praises the jarl for having sent nine princes to Odin (i.e. killed).

The latest Hákonardrápur refer to the king of Norway Hákon Hákonarson (Hákon the Old). They were composed in the 13th century by Gizurr Þorvaldsson, Óláfr Þórðarson hvítaskáld and Óláfr Leggsson svartaskáld.

== See also ==
- Hákonarflokkr
- Hákonarkviða
- Hákonarmál
