= Muhammad ibn Hani al-Andalusi al-Azdi =

Andalusī Sunni poet (936–973)

- أبو القاسم محمد بن هانئ بن محمد بن سعدون الأندلسي الأزدي
- Born: c. 936; Al-Andalus (now Spain)
- Died: c. 973; Fatimid Caliphate
- Occupation: Poet
- Writing career
- Language: Arabic
- Notable work: Poems in praise of the Fatimids

Muhammad ibn Hani al-Andalusi al-Azdi, (Arabic: أبو القاسم محمد بن هانئ بن محمد بن سعدون الأندلسي الأزدي, Abu'l-Qāsim Muhāmmad ibn Hāni' ibn Muhāmmad ibn Sa'dūn al-'Azdī; c. 936–973), usually called Ibn Hani, was an Andalusī Sunni poet and the chief court poet to the Fatimid Caliph al-Mu'izz. Most of his collected poems are in praise of the Fatimids against the claims of the Abbasids and the Umayyads of Iberia. He was also called al-Mutanabbi of the West (Arabic: متنبي الغرب) by many of his contemporaries as well as later historians. Ibn Hani was murdered on his way from Egypt in c. 973.

== Early life ==
Hāni's father was a native of a village near al-Mahdiyya in Tunisia, who had moved to Medina Elvira (now an archeological site near present-day Granada) in Spain or, according to others, to Córdoba. Ibn Hāni' was born in one of these two towns. He studied in Córdoba and then proceeded to Elvira and Seville. In the latter city, his frivolous way of living and too free speech brought upon him the wrath of the people who accused him of agreeing with the Greek philosophers and of heresy, so that he was counseled by the local ruler, a supporter, to leave Seville as he was afraid of being suspected of allying with him. At the age of 27, he went to Africa to Jawhar al-Siqilli, a freeman and general of the Fatimid al-Mansūr. When he received only 200 dinărs from the latter for a qasida addressed to him, he went to al-Masila (Msila) in Algiers where his compatriots Ja'far b. Ali b. Falah b. Abi Marwăn and Yahya b. Ali b. Hamdun al-Andalusi were ruling. Treated with great respect by them he composed some notable poems in their honor.

== Rise to prominence ==
Spending his childhood in a pro-Fatimid atmosphere, Ibn Hani was well versed with the Fatimid traditions and religious traits. He was at first a courtier to the Banu Hamdun of al-Masila, the Fatimid client state founded during the reign of Abdullah al Mahdi; then he joined the Fatimid court at al-Mansuriyyah before the Banu Hamdun allied themselves with the Zanata and pro-Umayyad factions. While at the Banu Hamdun, his fame spread throughout the empire owing to his incomparable odes until he was summoned by the Caliph Al-Muizz himself to serve him at his court, overwhelming him with tokens of esteem. He was a highly revered poet even before he entered the Capital. The poets of Ifriqiya lampooned him aiming to demoralize him upon his arrival to which he replied "I shall not reply to any of them unless Ali al Tunusi writes to me, for if he does I shall reply to him and no other." Hearing this, Ali replied, "I would never lampoon him even if I was the worst of all men after he has given me a status above all the other poets of this land.". At this point of time, he became the chief court poet and panegyrist of Al-Muizz. Defending the claims of the Fatimids against those of the sunni Umayyads and Abbasid usurpers, he continued to eulogize the merits of al-Muizz and other Fatimid Imams, making known their noble aims. He thus rendered a valuable service to Fatimid propaganda through his poetry, which was widely read from Córdoba to Baghdad.

== Politics ==
Ibn Hani played an important role in establishing the political propaganda for the Fatimid State through his poetry. He claimed in a number of panegyrical verses that not only all of the Muslim world, but the entire world belongs legitimately to the Fatimid Caliph. Also, his political mentioning dramatically merges with his religious views whereby he claims that the Umayyads and the Abbasids rule over illegitimate territories as they have defied the sayings of Muhammad by usurping and killing the Ahl al Bait for whom Muhammad willed obedience, loyalty and allegiance and the Fatimid Imam is that very descendant who claims absolute loyalty of the Muslim world. The Fatimids believed themselves surrounded by these two and the Byzantine Empire as enemies. The propaganda written by Ibn Hani attacked where he thought them most vulnerable. The Umayyads were chastised for cowardice, ostentatious luxury, questionable genealogy and ineptitude. The Abbasids, the weakest and most distant of the Fatimid adversaries, were seen as debauched people unworthy to rule, effeminate, indifferent to the Byzantine advances in Syria they were unable to check, and an old decrepit dynasty which should make room for new blood. The propaganda against the Byzantines, which was written primarily for internal consumption and self-congratulation, created an image of the infidel ever defeated by the might of Fatimid land and sea power. This propaganda coupled with intense diplomacy resulted in a series of convergent attacks against Egypt, the Byzantine fleet, the Qarmatians in Palestine and Berber tribes near Alexandria. After c. 966, an official Fatimid delegation was sent to Egypt inviting the amir Kafur to recognize Fatimid suzerainty. The embassy was given amiable reception but nothing more. On 23 April 968 C.E., Kafur died leaving Egypt open for conquest. The news reached al Muizz in al Mansuriyyah a month later. By the middle of Ramadan in the year 969 C.E., a messenger had returned to al Muizz with the glad tidings that Egypt had fallen to the Fatimids. Ibn Hani, ready on the spot, recited an ode which began thus: "The Abbasids are saying, "Has Egypt been conquered?", So say to them, "The matter has been decided!"

== Death ==
When al-Muizz went to Egypt in c. 972 to take up his residence in Cairo, Ibn Hani left him and returned to the Maghreb to bring back his family, but was murdered in Barqah in Cyrenaica on his road on Wednesday, 30 April, c. 973 at the age of 36. Accounts of his murder differ. When al Muizz in Egypt heard of the poet's death, he lamented, "He was a man whom we hoped to rival the poets of the East, but this was not granted to us."

== Diwan ==
There is scarce information about other court poets who flourished under the patronage of the Fatimid Caliph Imams. A large portion of their works seems to have perished in the destruction of Cairo's famed libraries which followed the collapse of the Fatimid state in c. 1171. Ibn Hani's diwan, apart from surviving, has been the subject of research for many scholars like Zahid Ali, Farhad Daftary and M. Canard, the author of the French book "L'imperialisme des Fatimides et leur propagande". Zahid Ali has edited the Diwan and elaborated the verses in his thesis "Tabyeen al Ma'ani fi Sharh Diwan Ibn Hani" for which he has received the Doctorate of Philosophy from the Oxford University in London. The Zahid Ali edition of the Diwan has sixty poems and three in the appendix which have disputed claims with regard to their authorship.

== See also ==
- List of Arabic language poets
- 10th century in poetry
- Al-Muizz Lideenillah
- Fatimid Caliphate
