= Kavijanasrayam =

Kavijanasrayam, also referred to as KavijanaaSrayam Kavijanaasrayamu and Kavijanaashrayam, a Jain Literature, is considered by scholars to be the earliest work detailing Telugu prosody, that is, how the basic rhythm of verses in Telugu poetry is structured. The work was authored by Malliya Rechana, a Telugu language poet and writer, who lived in the 10th century in the present-day Vemulawada, Telangana region of India.

While there are differing opinions on the exact year when the book was written, Kavijanasrayam is estimated to have been written between 900 and 950 CE. This is the oldest surviving piece of Telugu literatureand was the reference for many next generation poets. It is divided into five chapters. British scholar Charles Philip Brown wrote an English book on Telugu prosodic techniques based on Kavijanasrayam.
