= Shirayama Hime Shrine =

Shinto shrine in Hakusan, Ishikawa

Shirayama Hime Shrine 白山比咩神社
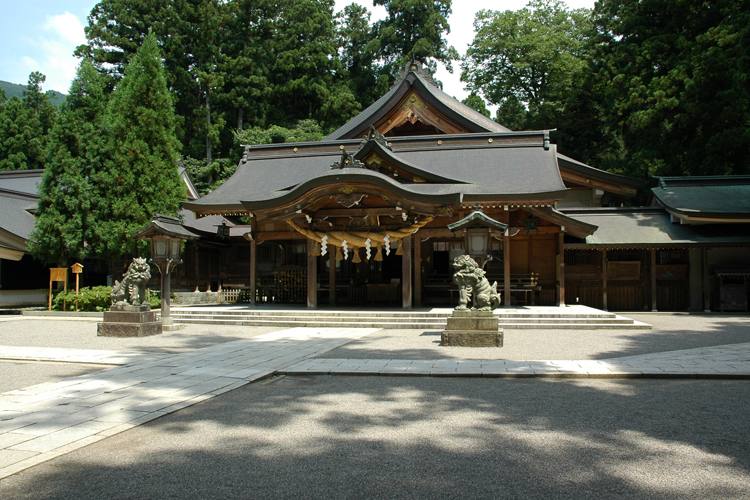
- Honden of Shirayama Hime Shrine

- Shirayama Hime Shrine Shirayama Hime Shrine (Japan)

Religion
- Affiliation: Shinto
- Deity: Shirayama Hime=Kikurihime no Kami; Izanagi; Izanami
- Festival: May 6

Location
- Location: 105-1, Ni, Sannomiya-machi, Hakusan; Ishikawa Prefecture 920-2114
- Interactive map of Shirayama Hime Shrine 白山比咩神社
- Coordinates: 36°26′5.5″N 136°38′10.1″E

Website
- www.shirayama.or.jp

Shirayamahime Jinja (白山比咩神社) is a Shinto shrine in the Sannomiyamachi neighborhood of the city of Hakusan in Ishikawa Prefecture, Japan. It is the ichinomiya of former Kaga Province. The main festival of the shrine is held annually on May 6. It is the head shrine of approximately 2000 "Hakusan Jinja" across Japan. Though read differently, "Shirayama" and "Hakusan" use the same characters (白山) in Japanese.

== Enshrined kami ==
The kami enshrined at Shirayamahime Jinja are:

- Shirayamahime-no-Okami (白山比咩大神), also known as Kikurihime, the deified Hakusan volcano
- Izanagi-no-Mikoto (伊邪那岐尊), the creator god
- Izanami-no-Mikoto (伊弉冉尊), the creator goddess

== History ==
The Shirayamahime Jinja is located at the foot of 2702 meter Mount Hakusan, a sacred mountain on the border of Ishikawa and Gifu Prefectures. The shrine consists of the "Hakusan Hongū" or Shimo-Hakusan, located at the foot of the mountain, and the "Oku-no-miya" located at the summit of the Gozengamine peak of the mountain. The origins of Shirayamahime Jinja are unknown. The mountain has been an object of worship from prehistoric times, and one of the Three Holy Mountains of Japan. Although there is no documentary evidence, the shrine claims that it was first established by the legendary Kofun period Emperor Sujin (reigned 97 BC – 30 BC) and was rebuilt in 716 by Empress Genshō. The shugendō monk Taichō is said to have been the first person to reach the summit in 717, and to have built a chapel there. However, the first appearance of the shrine in historical documentation is an entry date 853 in the Nihon Montoku Tennō Jitsuroku, in which it was granted third court rank. At some point in the mid-Heian period, the shrine came to be regarded as the ichinomiya of the province. During the Kamakura and early Muromachi periods the shrine prospered greatly as in collaboration with Zen Buddhism, Hakusan shrines were established at many locations around the country. However, this prosperity came to an end with the Kaga ikki in 1455. During this rebellion, the shrine lost its estates and revenues and in 1480 the shrine, which was located on the banks of the Tedori River at the time, was destroyed by fire. It remained in ruins for over a century.

The shrine was restored by Maeda Toshiie, daimyō of Kaga Domain under the Tokugawa shogunate in the early Edo period, and continued to grow and prosper with the patronage of the Maeda clan until the Meiji Restoration. During the Meiji period era of State Shinto, the shrine was designated as a National shrine, 2nd rank (国幣中社, kokuhei-chūsha) under the modern system of ranked Shinto shrines.

== Cultural Properties ==
=== National Treasures ===
- Sword (inscribed Yoshimitsu) (剣), Kamakura period; Blade length 22.9 cm, width at base 2.2 cm. Made by Tōshirō Yoshimitsu, said to be the son of Kyo Awataguchi Noriyoshi or Kuniyoshi. Yoshimitsu is most known for his short swords.

=== National Important Cultural Properties ===
- Colored silk painting of Hakusan Shansha Kami (絹本著色白山三社神像), Kamakura period; This painting depicts three deities: the Eleven-Headed Kannon above the central female deity, Dainichi Nyorai above the male deity to the right, and the seed of the Thousand-Armed Kannon above the female deity to the left,.
- Wooden statues of Komainu (木造狛犬), Kamakura period (1 pair);.
- Wooden statues of Lion Komainu (木造獅子狛犬), Heian period (1 pair);.
- Tachi sword (Nagamitsu) (太刀（銘 長光）), Kamakura period;.
- Black lacquer saddle with mother-of-pearl inlay. (黒漆螺鈿鞍), Kamakura period;.
- Hakusan Engi (白山縁起), Muromachi period (1439);.
- Shinno Shotoki (神皇正統記), Muromachi period (1438);.
- Sangu Koki (三宮古記), Nanboku-cho period;.
- Records of the Hakusan Shrine Sogen lecture (白山宮荘厳講中記録), Nanboku-cho period;.
- Gold wire inlay Box (沈金彫手筥), Muromachi period;.

=== Ishikawa Prefecture Designated Tangible Cultural Properties ===
- Honden (本殿), Edo period;.
- Swords (刀剣), set of 11
- Tachi sword (signed Yukimitsu, with Goto Saijiro Yoshisada's silver fittings and a black lacquer box with a history of donation from Maeda Toshitsune) (太刀(銘 行光、附 後藤才次郎吉定総銀金具太刀拵及び前田利常奉納由来記載黒漆箱).
- Tachi sword, (signed by Kanemaki, a resident of Kanazawa, Kaga Province) (太刀(銘 加賀国金沢住兼巻作).
- Shirayama Hime Shrine Documents (白山比咩神社文書), 766 items.

== See also ==
- List of Shinto shrines
- Ichinomiya
- List of National Treasures of Japan (crafts)
