= Fujiwara no Toshiyuki =

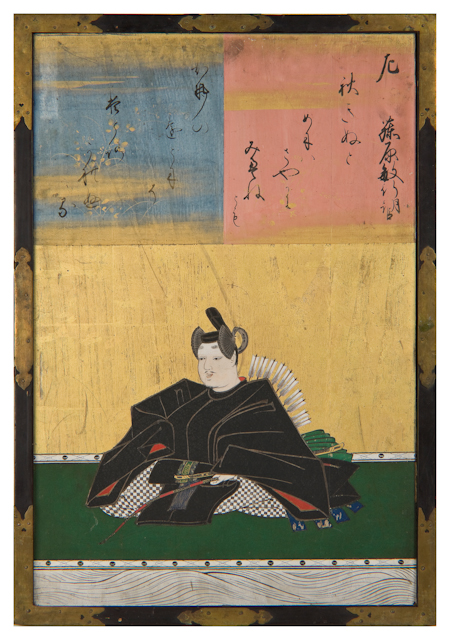
Portrait of Fujiwara no Toshiyuki

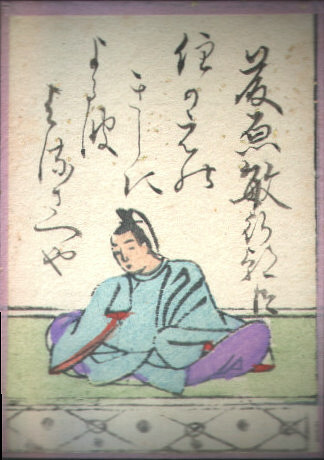
Fujiwara no Toshiyuki, from the Ogura Hyakunin Isshu.

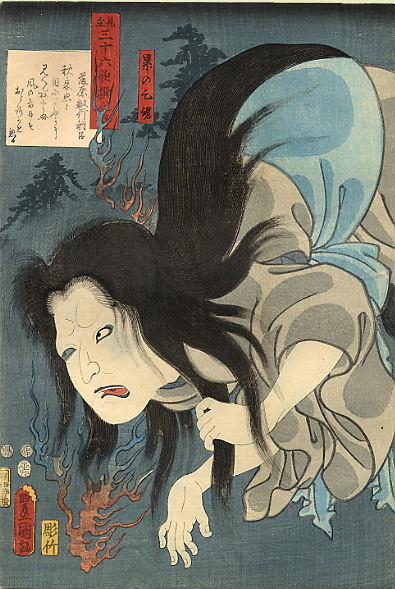
Fujiwara no Toshiyuki depicted as the ghost of Rui no Hitodama, in a print by Kunisada.

Fujiwara no Toshiyuki (birthdate unknown – 901 or 907, Japanese: 藤原 敏行, also 藤原 敏行 朝臣 Fujiwara Toshiyuki no Ason) was a middle Heian waka poet and Japanese nobleman. He was designated a member of the Thirty-six Poetry Immortals, and one of his poems is included in the famous anthology Hyakunin Isshu.

Toshiyuki's poems are included in several imperial poetry anthologies, including Kokin Wakashū and Gosen Wakashū. A personal poetry collection known as the Toshiyukishū also remains.
