= Nōin =

Japanese poet

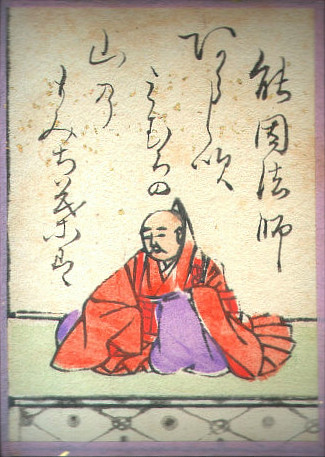
Priest Nōin (能因法師, Nōin-hōshi), from the Ogura Hyakunin Isshu.

Tachibana no Nagayasu (橘永愷; 988 – c. 1051), also known as Nōin (能因), was a Japanese poet and monk of the late Heian period.

Along with Izumi Shikibu, Nōin is one of "Thirty-six Medieval Poetry Immortals" of waka poetry selected by Fujiwara no Norikane (1107–1165).

Nōin is the author of Gengenshu and Nōin Utamakura.

== Poetry ==
One of his poems is anthologized in the Ogura Hyakunin Isshu:

嵐吹く三室の山のもみぢ葉は
龍田の川の錦なりけり
arashi fuku Mimuro-no-yama no momijiba wa
Tatsuta-no-kawa no nishiki narikeri
Blown by storm winds, Mt. Mimuro's autumn leaves have become Tatsuta river's richly hued brocade!
(Goshūi Wakashū 5:366)

== Bibliography ==
- Peter McMillan (2008) One hundred poets, one poem each : a translation of the Ogura Hyakunin Isshu. New York : Columbia University Press. ISBN 978-0-231-14398-1
