= Eysteinn Valdason =

Icelandic skald

Eysteinn Valdason (Old Norse: [ˈœyˌstɛinː ˈwɑldɑˌson]; Modern Icelandic: [ˈeiːˌsteitn ˈvaltaˌsɔːn]) was a 10th-century Icelandic skald. Three half-stanzas from a poem about Thor are all that survive of his work. Preserved in Snorri Sturluson's Skáldskaparmál (4) only, they deal with Thor's fishing expedition with the giant Hymir, where the god attempts to kill Jörmungandr.
