= Fujiwara no Tametoki =

- 藤原 為時
- Died: 1029?
- Known for: Author of Japanese waka and Chinese poetry
- Children: Murasaki Shikibu

Fujiwara no Tametoki (藤原 為時) (died 1029?) was a Japanese aristocrat, author of Japanese waka and Chinese poetry of some repute, and the father of Murasaki Shikibu (Lady Murasaki", author of The Tale of Genji, born ca. 970 or 973). Tametoki's position at the Shikibu-shō ministry was what probably became part of his daughter's historical appellation, "Murasaki Shikibu".

== Life ==
Tametoki was well-read and an accomplished poet. Three of his waka poems were selected to the Goshūi Wakashū (1086) and one to the Shin Kokin Wakashū (Note: Although Fischer 1991, p. 79 says "nine.. were included in the Goshūishū") Also thirteen of his Chinese verses are in the anthology Honchō reisō (本朝麗藻) of 1010.

Tametoki served as tutor to the Crown Prince Morosada, and when the prince ascended the throne as Emperor Kazan, he was elevated to shikibu no daijō (式部大丞; "senior secretary of the Ministry of Ceremonials). (Note: Shikibu-shō (式部省), amended from 'Bureau of Ceremonials' as given in Murase's book. In current version of Wikipedia it occurs under article heading: 'Ministry of Civil Services') Tametoki also simultaneously held the office of kurōdo (蔵人; "Chamberlain") more specifically rokui no kurōdo (六位蔵人, "Chamberlain of the Sixth Rank"). Tametoki's position as kurōdo gained him special privileges to attend court (and thus meet with Emperor Kazan).

With the resignation of Emperor Kazan in 986, Tametoki was relieved of all his posts, and devoted his time to educating his son Nobunori (惟規).

Tametoki went without position for 10 years, in marked contrast to the man who would become Lady Murasaki's husband, who was at one time Tametoki's predecessor on the same job (secretary of Shikibe-jō and chamberlain) yet continued to gain lucrative governorships.

Tametoki finally wrote a poem to Emperor Ichijō that so moved the monarch it garnered him governorship of Echizen Province. Lady Murasaki accompanied Tametoki there, though she did not stay for the full four year tenure and returned after 1 or 2 years. Kojidan includes an episode that the governorship of Echizen had already gone to Minamoto no Kunimori (源国盛) who had to be recalled in order to give way to Tametoki wrested the position away. This so distressed Kunimori he fell ill, and even though he was awarded Harima as replacement, he never recovered and died. (Note: This is more fully discussed in ja:藤原為時#越前守任官に関する逸話, including the relevant extract from Kojidan.)

Tametoki was promoted to the rank of "Senior fifth rank, lower grade" (正五位下), and sashōben (左少弁, "Minor Controller of the Left") in 1009. Subsequently he was commissioned as governor of Echigo Province in 1011, but his son Nobunori died in Echigo that same year, and he returned to the capital in 1014 before the full term. He became a monk at Mii-dera temple (located in what is now Ōtsu, Shiga) two years later.

Scholars do not agree about the years of Tametoki's birth or death, although some give his death year as 1029.
