= Ishikawa Prefectural Museum of Art =

- 石川県立美術館
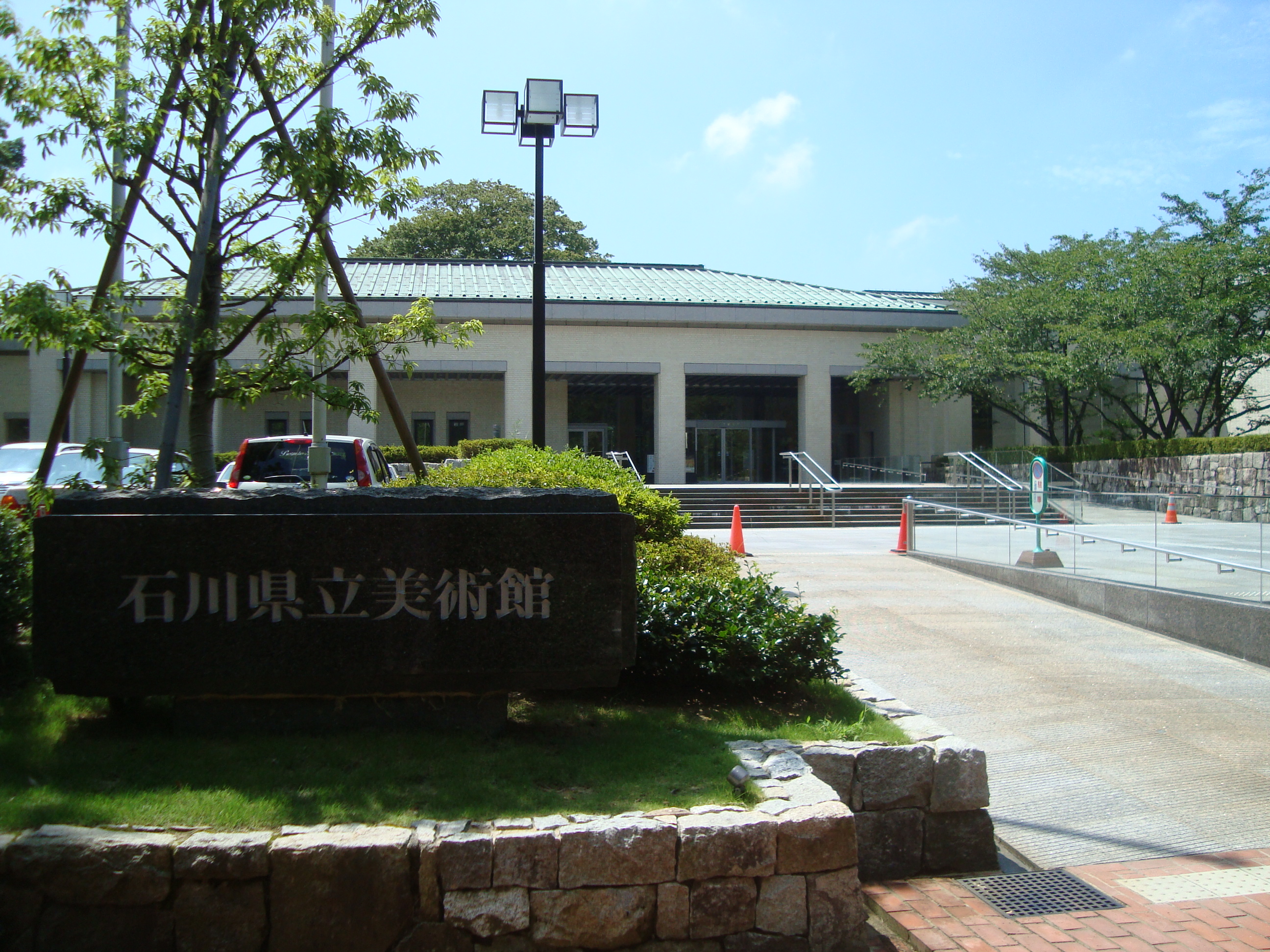

General information
- Location: 2-1 Dewa-cho, Kanazawa, Ishikawa Prefecture, Japan
- Coordinates: 36°33′36″N 136°39′41″E
- Opened: 1959
- Renovated: 1983

Technical details
- Floor area: 12,422.33m^{2}

Website
- Official website

Ishikawa Prefectural Museum of Art (石川県立美術館, Ishikawa Kenritsu Bijutsukan), also known as IPMA, is the main art gallery of Ishikawa Prefecture, Japan. It is one of Japan's many museums which are supported by a prefecture.

The collection includes some of the prefecture's most important cultural assets and works by artists with some connection to the region. It is located in Kanazawa, Ishikawa within the grounds of the Kenrokuen Garden.

The gallery was first opened in 1959. When the collection outgrew its original building, a new facility was constructed. The current structure was completed in 1983.

The museum has a large permanent collection; and only part of it is exhibited at any one time. The core collection includes significant works from the Maeda family collection which had been previously housed in at the University of Tokyo.

== See also ==
- List of National Treasures of Japan (crafts: others)
- Maeda Ikutokukai
- Prefectural museum
