= Saigū no Nyōgo =

Japanese poet (929–985)

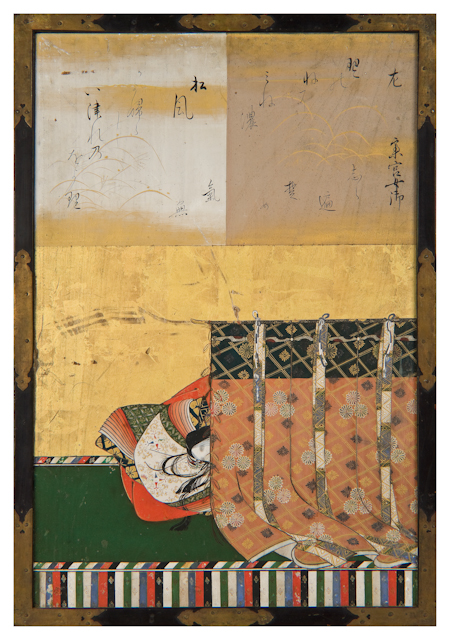
Saigū no Nyōgo by Kanō Naonobu, 1648

Princess Kishi (929–985, 徽子女王, also Yoshiko Joō 承香殿女御 Jokyōden Joō or 斎宮女御 Saigū no Nyōgo) was a Japanese princess and Waka poet of the middle Heian period. She is one of only five women included among the Thirty-six Immortals of Poetry.

== Biography ==
Kishi's place of birth is unknown. Her mother was Fujiwara no Kanshi (905–945), the second daughter of the daijō-daijin Fujiwara no Tadahira, and her father was Prince Shigeaki Rashinnō (904–954), the fourth son of Emperor Daigo. As a granddaughter of the last, Kishi ranked as an imperial princess.

Upon the death of Daigo's daughter Princess Saiko (斉子内親王) in 936, Kishi was chosen through divination with turtle bones as successor to Saiko's post as chief priestess of the Ise Shrine. In order to purify herself in preparation for this office she resided in the Nonomiya of the imperial palace, before moving in 938 to the Ise Shrine. Kishi was then ten years old, and her uncle Fujiwara no Morosuke took over management of the shrine.

Kishi's mother died in 945. At this point she resigned from her post at the Ise Shrine and moved to Kyoto. In 948 she entered the imperial palace there at the request of her uncle, Emperor Murakami, and became his consort. Their daughter Princess Noriko was born in 959, and in 977 was chosen as chief priestess of the Ise Shrine. Kishi and Murakami also had a son, who died young.

At Murakami's death in 967, Kishi moved from the inner to the outer precinct of the palace. Kishi retained a high place at court and acted as a priestess at the Ise Shrine until 984. She died in 985.

== Works ==
45 of her poems are included in the third Japanese imperial poetry anthology, Shūi Wakashū, issued in c. 1005–6, with still more preserved in the private anthology Saigu-nyo Goshū. Her poems can also be found in other imperial and private anthologies.
