= Mibu no Tadami =

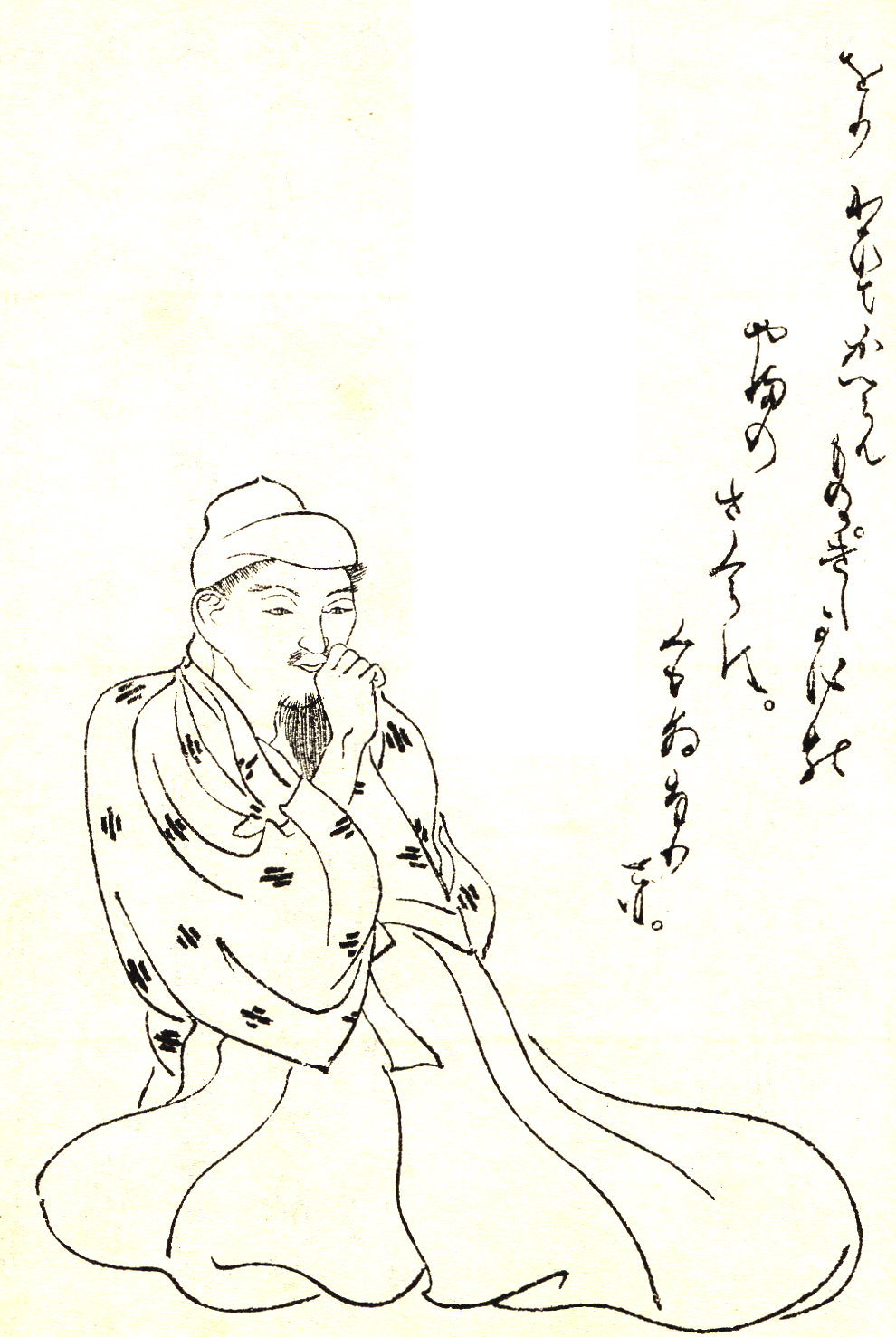
Mibu no Tadami by Kikuchi Yosai

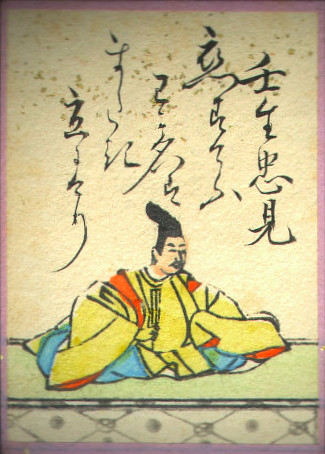
Mibu no Tadami, from the Ogura Hyakunin Isshu.

Mibu no Tadami (dates unknown, 壬生忠見) was a middle Heian period waka poet and Japanese nobleman. He is designated as a member of the Thirty-six Poetry Immortals. His father Mibu no Tadamine was also a distinguished poet.

His poems are included in several imperial poetry anthologies; a personal poetry collection known as the Tadamishū (忠見集) also remains.
