= Minamoto no Kintada =

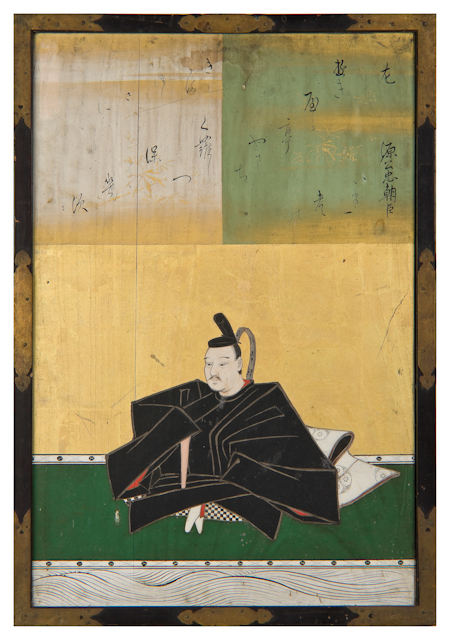
Minamoto no Kintada Asomi by Kanō Naonobu, 1648

Minamoto no Kintada (889–948, Japanese: 源 公忠, also 源公忠朝臣 Miyamoto no Kintada Ason) was a middle Heian waka poet and nobleman. Along with his son, Minamoto no Saneakira, he is designated a member of the Thirty-six Poetry Immortals. Under Emperor Daigo and Emperor Suzaku, he was an official in the imperial treasury.

Kintada's poems are included in imperial poetry anthologies from the Goshūi Wakashū onward. A personal collection known as the Kintadashū also remains. The Great Mirror and Yamato Monogatari preserve anecdotes about him, and he excelled in falconry and kōdō, in addition to poetry.
