= Guthormr sindri =

10th-century Norwegian skald

Guthormr sindri (or Gothormr sindri) is a 10th-century Norwegian skald. He was a court-poet of king Haraldr Fairhair (hárfagri) and his sons, Hálfdan the Black (svarti) and Hákon the Good (góði), for whom he composed the Hákonardrápa.

Snorri Sturluson relates how Guthormr intervened between Haraldr and Hálfdan and succeeded in putting an end to their conflict:

When Halfdan the Black heard this he levied ships and men, so that he had a great force, and proceeded with it to Stad, within Thorsbjerg. King Harald lay with his men at Reinsletta. Now people went between them, and among others a clever man called Guthorm Sindre, who was then in Halfdan the Black's army, but had been formerly in the service of King Harald, and was a great friend of both. Guthorm was a great skald, and had once composed a song both about the father and the son, for which they had offered him a reward. But he would take nothing; but only asked that, some day or other, they should grant him any request he should make, which they promised to do. Now he presented himself to King Harald, brought words of peace between them, and made the request to them both that they should be reconciled. So highly did the king esteem him, that in consequence of his request they were reconciled.

—Harald Harfager's Saga (39), Laing's translation

The Hákonardrápa is Guthormr's only known work, since the poems about Haraldr Fairhair and Hálfdan the Black mentioned by Snorri were lost. Six stanzas and two half stanzas of the Hákonardrápa are preserved in Snorri's Hákonar saga góða and in Óláfs saga Tryggvasonar en mesta. The poem recounts the battles won by Hákon the Good against the Danes (1-2), his raids in Zealand, Scania and Götaland (3-4) and his victories over the sons of his brother Eric Bloodaxe (6-8).
