= Abu-Shakur Balkhi =

10th century Persian poet

Abu Shakur Balkhi (Persian: ابوشکور بلخی; born possibly in 912-13) was one of the most important Persian poets of the Samanid period.

He was a contemporary of Rudaki, and wrote three masnavis, the work Āfarin nama (written in 944) among them. Only 192 scraps of his verses remain today.

== Sources ==
- E.G. Browne. Literary History of Persia. (Four volumes, 2,256 pages, and twenty-five years in the writing). 1998. ISBN 0-7007-0406-X
- Jan Rypka, History of Iranian Literature. Reidel Publishing Company. ASIN B-000-6BXVT-K

== See also ==
- List of Persian poets and authors
