= Ōnakatomi no Yorimoto =

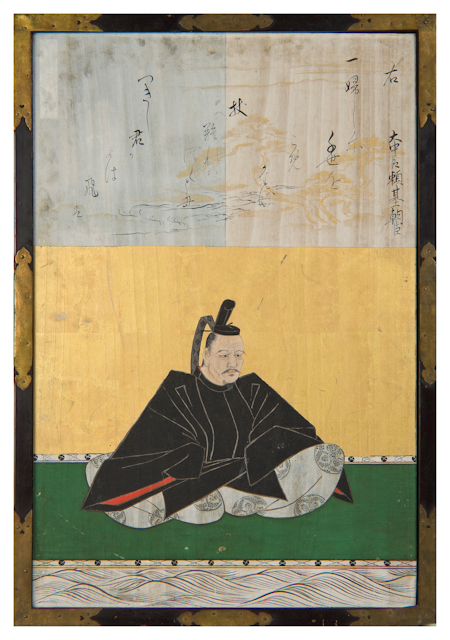
Ōnakatomi no Yorimoto Asomi by Kanō Yasunobu, 1648

Ōnakatomi no Yorimoto (c. April 18, 886–October 31, 958, 大中臣 頼基) was a middle Heian period waka poet and Japanese nobleman. He is a designated member of the Thirty-six Poetry Immortals.

Ōnakatomi no Yorimoto's poems are included in several official poetry anthologies, including the Shūi Wakashū. A personal collection known as the Yorimoto-shū (頼基集) also remains.
