= Mibu no Tadamine =

Japanese waka poet

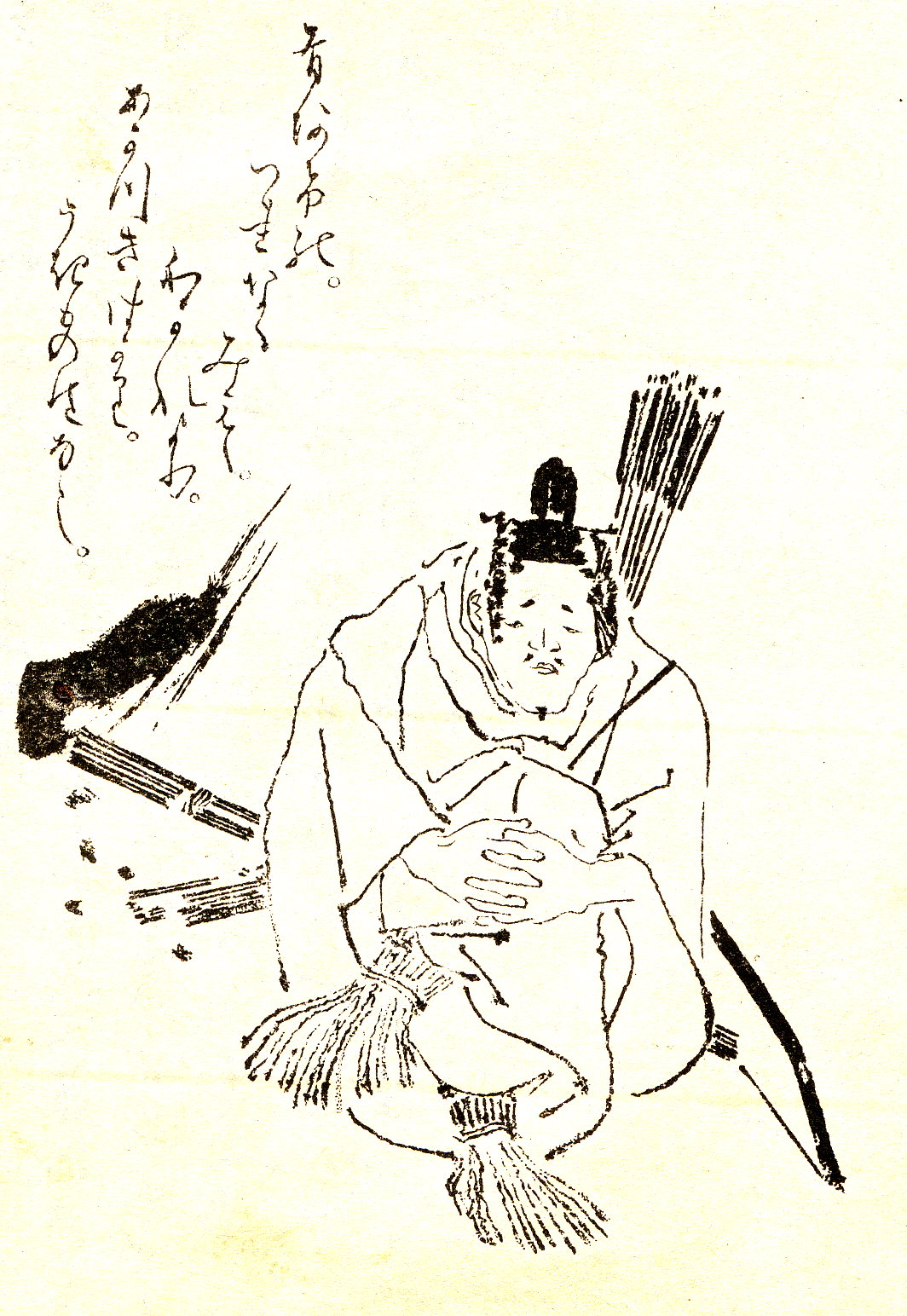
Mibu no Tadamine by Kikuchi Yosai

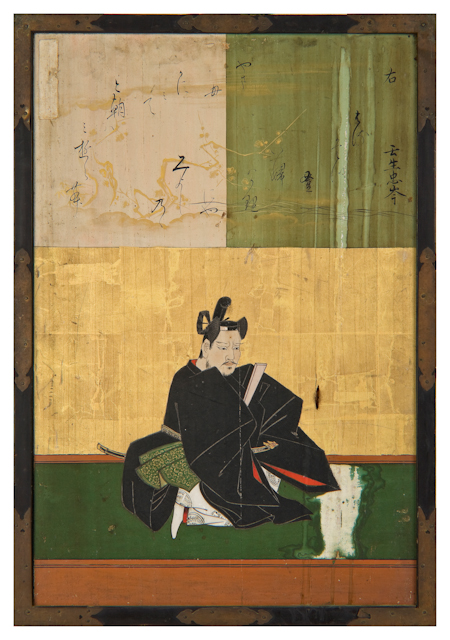
Mibu no Tadamine by Kanō Yasunobu, 1648

Mibu no Tadamine (壬生忠岑) was an early Heian waka poet of the court (active 898–920), and a member of the sanjūrokkasen or Thirty-six Poetry Immortals. His son Mibu no Tadami was also a distinguished poet.

He emerged as an important poet in an early uta-awase or poetry match, Koresada no miko no ie no uta'awase (是貞の親王家歌合, The Poetry Match at Prince Koresada's Residence; c. 893), and was involved in many of the poetic activities of the day, including a position as a compiler of the Kokin Wakashū. A collection of his personal poems appeared as the Tadamine shū, though more than half of it is not certainly canon. He is also famous for the Tadamine Juttei (忠岑十体, Ten Styles of Tadamine; c. 945), an influential work of Heian criticism.
