= Nakatsukasa =

Japanese Waka poet from the middle Heian period

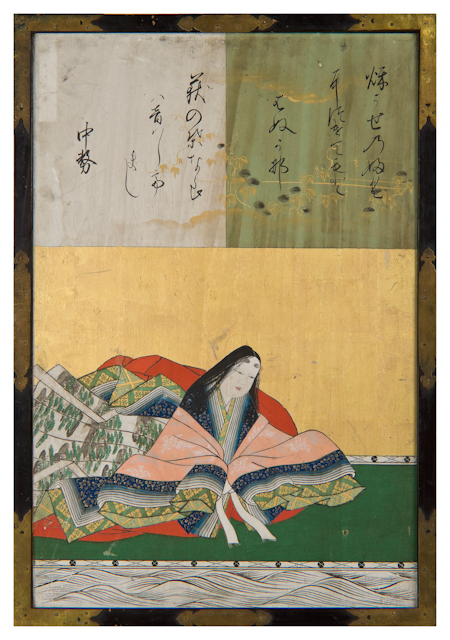
Nakatsukasa by Kanō Yasunobu, 1648

Nakatsukasa (中務, 912–991) was a Japanese Waka poet from the middle Heian period.

Nakatsukasa was the granddaughter of Emperor Uda and the daughter of poet Lady Ise and Prince Atsuyoshi. She is one of five women numbered as one of the Thirty-six Poetry Immortals. (She married another of the famous thirty-six, Minamoto no Saneakira (源信明).

Many of her poems are included in the Japanese imperial poetry anthology Gosen Wakashū (後撰和歌集), issued in 951. She also was responsible for compiling a collection of her mother's poems.
