= Lady Ise =

Japanese poet

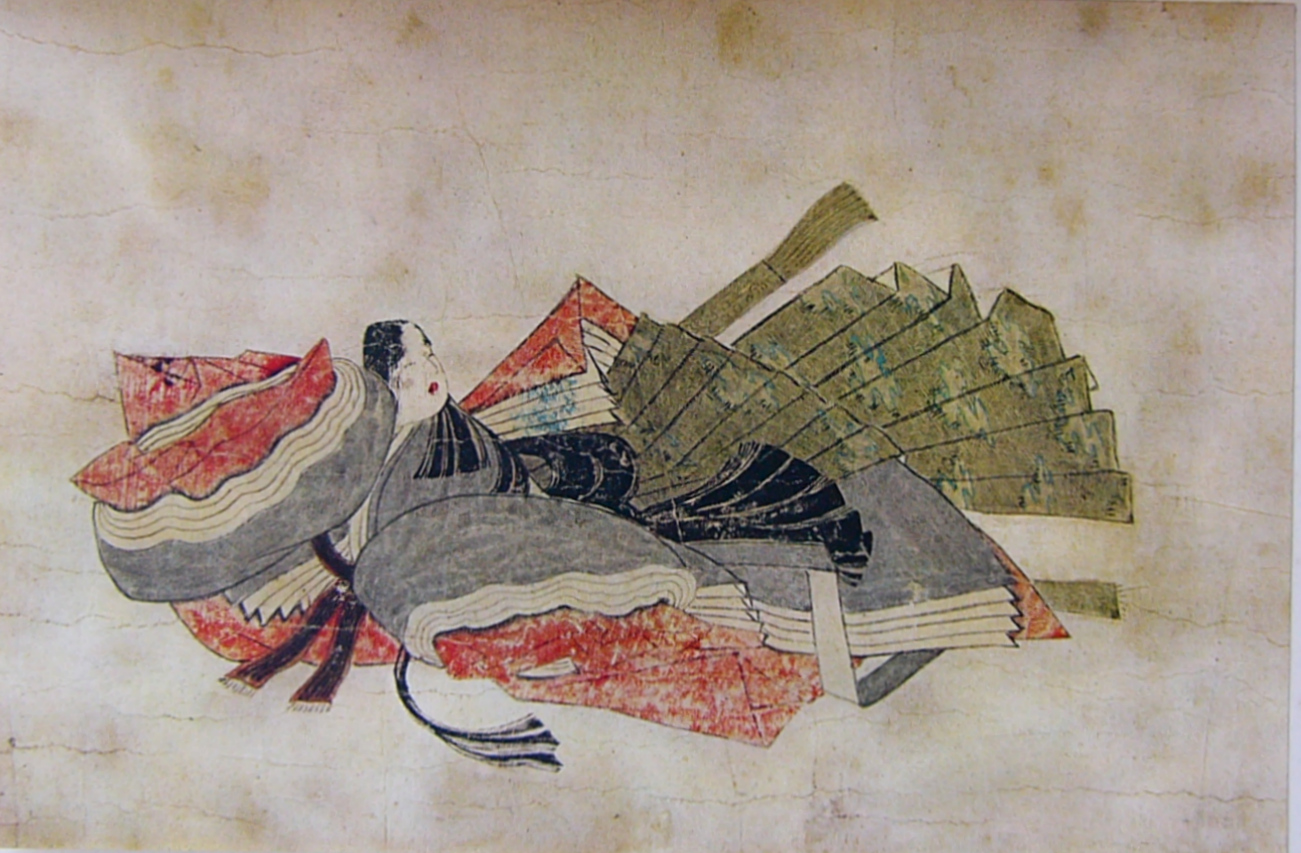
13th century Satake 36poets

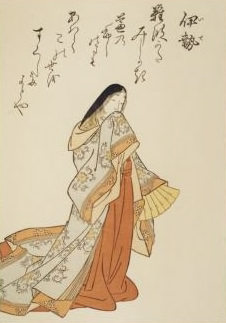

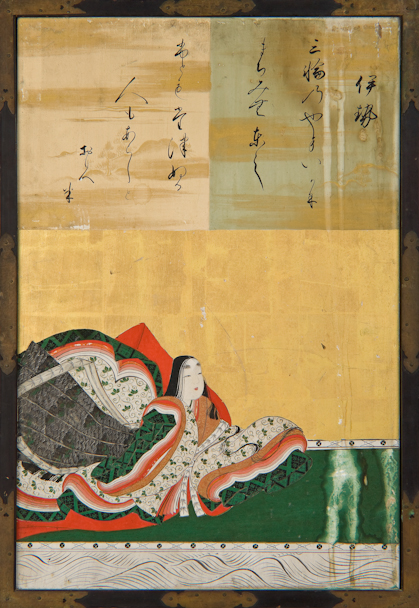
Ise by Kanō Tan'yū, 1648

Lady Ise (伊勢; c. 875 – c. 938), also known as Ise no Miyasudokoro (伊勢の御息所), was a Japanese poet in the Imperial court's waka tradition. She was born to Fujiwara no Tsugukage of Ise Province, and eventually became the lover of the Prince Atsuyoshi and a concubine to Emperor Uda; her son by him was Prince Yuki-Akari. She also had a daughter with Prince Atsuyoshi called Nakatsukasa.

Her poems were emblematic of the changing styles of the time, and 22 of them were included in the Kokin Wakashū.

One of her poems was included in the Ogura Hyakunin Isshu.

== Poems ==
Japanese
Rōmaji
English translation

青柳の
枝にかかれる
春雨は
糸もてぬける
玉かとぞ見る

Aoyagi no
Eda ni kakareru
Harusame wa
Ito motenukeru
Tama ka to zo miru

Hanging from the branches of a green
Willow tree,
The spring rain
Is a
Thread of pearls.

難波潟
みじかき芦の
ふしのまも
あはでこの世を
過ぐしてよとや

Naniwa-gata
Mijikaki ashi no
Fushi no ma mo
Awade kono yo o
Sugushite yo to ya

Even for a time
Short as a piece of the reeds
In Naniwa's marsh,
We must never meet again:
Is this what you are asking me?
