= Wang Yucheng =

Chinese poet

Wang Yucheng (or Yu-Ch'eng) (王禹偁, 954–1001) was a Chinese poet from Juye in the Shandong province during the Song dynasty. He served in a government post and was known for forthright criticism of policies; this led to his eventual banishment to the South.

His text Jianlong yishi (建隆遺事), discussed by historian Li Tao in Xu zizhi tongjian changbian (續資治通鑑長編), is no longer extant.

The book Wang Yucheng yanjiu (王禹偁研究) by Huang Chi-fang of National Taiwan University examines the development of Song-era guwen.
