= Nagavarma I =

Indian writer

Nāgavarma I
- Born: 950 CE
- Died: 1015 CE
- Occupations: Kannada poet, writer, and grammarian
- Notable work: Chandōmbudhi, Karnātaka Kādambari

Nāgavarma I (c. 990) was a noted Jain writer and poet in the Kannada language in the late 10th century. His two important works, both of which are extant, are Karnātaka Kādambari, a champu (mixed prose-verse metre) based romance novel and an adaptation of Bana's Sanskrit Kādambari, and Chandōmbudhi (also spelt Chhandombudhi, lit, "Ocean of prosody" or "Ocean of metres"), the earliest available work on Kannada prosody which Nāgavarma I claims would command the respect even of poet Kalidasa. According to the scholars K.A. Nilakanta Shastri and R. Narasimhacharya, Nāgavarma I belonged to a migrant Brahmin family originally from Vengi (in modern Andhra Pradesh). According to the modern Kannada poet and scholar Govinda Pai, Nāgavarma I lived from 950 CE to 1015 CE. So popular was Nāgavarma I's poetic skills that King Bhoja of Malwa (central India) presented him with horses, in appreciation of his poetic skills.

== Writings ==
Nāgavarma I was patronised by King Rakkasa Ganga (also called Rachamalla V, 986–999 CE) of the Western Ganga Dynasty. According to the scholar Sheldon Pollock, he is the first among as many as five Nāgavarmas' who wrote noted classics in the Kannada language over the succeeding few centuries. Nāgavarma I became popular during the classical age of Kannada literature. During this period (9th through 12th century), classics in Kannada language were usually inspired by the great Sanskrit language epics of India, or were didactic in nature and were derived from Jain lore and legend. Writing on themes that were Loukika (secular and historical) and Agamika (religious) was popular.

His Karnataka Kadambari is not considered a direct translation of the Sanskrit original. Written in a smooth flowing language, it has an originality of its own. Chandombudhi, the earliest work on the science of prosody (Chandonusasana) is important from the point of establishing a relationship between native (desi) folk metrical forms of Kannada and the dominant Sanskritic literary culture that had descended on medieval Karnataka. It was written at a time when the Sanskrit textual production had won mainstream (margam) appeal and its scholars were held in high esteem. The text also conveys that popularity of a Kannada writing was based on the types of native compositions used. The text overall tries to reconcile local literary traditions with the mainstream Sanskrit cosmopolitan.

Nāgavarma I devoted an entire section of the Chandombudhi to native Kannada metres and called it Kannadavisayajati. He mentions the native shatpadi (six-line verse) metre, two centuries before it was hugely popularised by the Hoysala poet Raghavanka in the 1225 CE. He also dwells at length on metres that were common to Sanskrit and Kannada and calls the section samavrtta, metres (vrtta) inherited from Sanskrit and very much in vogue among the classical poets of Kannada language. According to Nāgavarma I, some native metrical forms such as the ragale and dandaka that were later to become popular in Kannada have similarities with Prakrit language metres.
