= Fujiwara no Takamitsu =

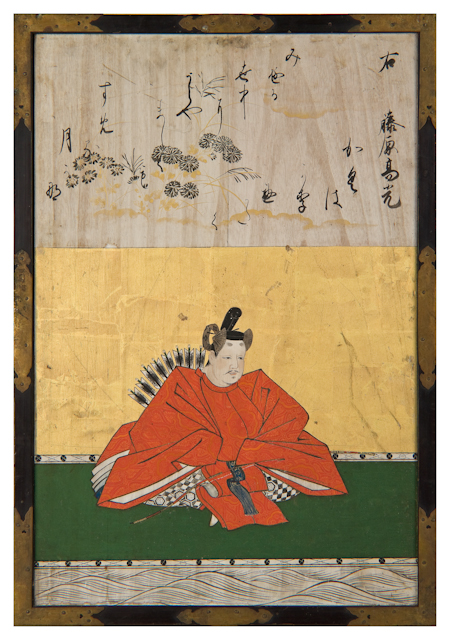
Fujiwara no Takamitsu by Kanō Yasunobu, 1648

Fujiwara no Takamitsu (藤原 高光, c. 939-994) was a mid-Heian period waka poet and Japanese nobleman. He is designated as a member of the Thirty-six Poetry Immortals. His father was Fujiwara no Morosuke, and his mother was Princess Masako (ja:雅子内親王, Masako Naishin'nō), the daughter of Emperor Daigo. He was a brilliant waka poet, acclaimed as a genius when he was fifteen, and was included in the Thirty-Six Immortals of Poetry.

Takamitsu’s decision to abandon family and social station for life as a Buddhist monk in 961, along with his extended family’s grief over that action, is documented in Tōnomine Shōshō Monogatari. Takamitsu, upon renouncing the world, first lived in “the monastery on Mount Hiei, not far from the capital” but relocated, perhaps as early as 962, “to remote Tōnomine, where he spent the rest of his life, occasioning the name by which he is usually known.”

Takamitsu's poems are included in several imperial poetry anthologies from the Gosen Wakashū on. A personal collection known as the "Takamitsu Anthology (高光集, Takamitsu-shū) is also extant.

== Sources ==
- Keene, Donald. Travelers of a Hundred Ages. New York: Columbia University Press, 1999. ISBN 978-0231114370
- Mostow, Joshua S. At the House of Gathered Leaves: Shorter Biographical and Autobiographical Narratives from Japanese Court Literature. Honolulu: University of Hawaii Press, 2004. ISBN 978-0824827786
