= Minamoto no Saneakira =

Japanese poet

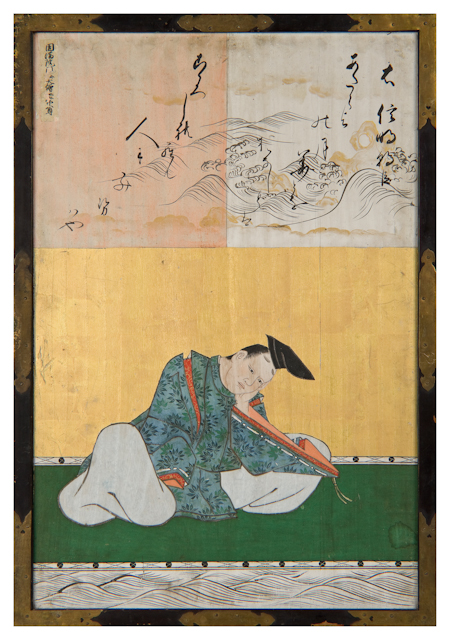
Saneakira Asomi by Kanō Yasunobu, 1648

Minamoto no Saneakira (Japanese: 源 信明) (910–970) was a middle Heian waka poet and nobleman. Along with his father, Minamoto no Kintada, he was designated a member of the Thirty-six Poetry Immortals.

Kintada's poems are included in imperial poetry anthologies from the Goshūi Wakashū onward. A personal collection known as the Saneakira shū (信明集) also remains.
