= Fujiwara no Asatada =

Japanese poet (910–966)

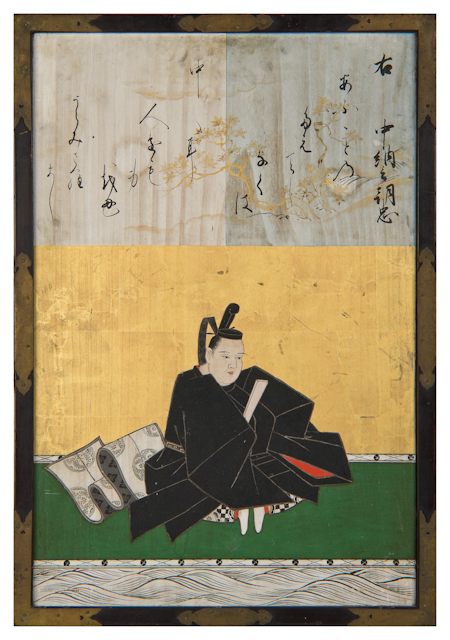
Portrait by Kanō Yasunobu

Fujiwara no Asatada (Japanese: 藤原 朝忠, also 中納言朝忠, Chunagon Asatada) (910 – January 19, 966) was a middle Heian waka and Japanese nobleman. He was designated a member of the Thirty-six Poetry Immortals and one of his poems is included in the famous anthology Hyakunin Isshu.

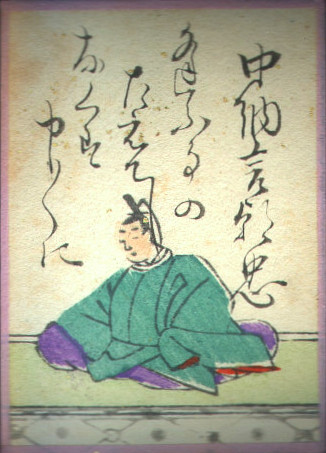
Fujiwara no Asatada, from the Ogura Hyakunin Isshu.

Asatada's poems are included in official poetry anthologies from the Gosen Wakashū onward. A personal collection known as the Asatadashū also remains.

He died in 966.
