= Shath =

Ecstatic utterance in Sufism

A shath (Arabic: شطح šaṭḥ, plural: šaṭaḥāt or šaṭḥiyyāt), in the Islamic mystical tradition of Sufism, is an ecstatic utterance which often seems outrageous; however, it also holds immense significance within Sufism by acting as a conduit of mysticism that communicates implicit religious beliefs and ideals through different modes of consciousness. The word is derived from the root š-ṭ-ḥ, which carries the sense of overflowing or outpouring caused by agitation. Sufi authors tend to vary in their interpretations of shath, sometimes claiming that such utterances were misquotations, being attributed to immaturity, madness, individual rhetoric, or intoxication. At other times Sufi authors regarded shath as authentic expressions of profound states of consciousness, spirituality, and even the profoundest experience of divine realities, which should not be manifested to the unworthy. In order to cultivate a society with those worthy of communion through Shath, the establishment of institutions of "Words of Ecstasy" began in the classical and post-classical periods. The socioreligious importance and foundations of these institutions were figure-headed by prominent mystics of the period like Bayezid Bistami, Nuri, Hallaj, Ayn al-Qudat, and Ruzbihan Baqli. Many Sufi authors, including al-Ghazali, showed ambivalence about the apparent blasphemy ingrained in the nature of some shathiyat, while admiring the spiritual status of their authors.

The height in popularity of shath occurred during the classical period of Sufism from the ninth to twelfth century AD (the third to sixth century AH). The principal Sufi interpretation of the shathiyat which took the form of "I am" sayings contrasted the permanence of God (baqā’) with the mystical annihilation of the individual ego (fanā’), which made it possible for God to speak through the individual. These "I am" sayings allowed for a sense of self-reflection through the lens of Islamic religious ideology that was often overwhelming to those who hadn't experienced shath. While these terms, phrases, and utterances are somewhat incoherent to the outside listener, they are instead interpreted through shared-experience (in consciousness/communion), code, symbol, kenning, metaphor, simile, etc.; by fellow Sufi Mystics, therefore communicating their revelations through allegory and Islamic rhetoric following their direct experiences of godliness. These phrases later figured as topoi of Persian Sufi poetry (especially that of Farid al-Din Attar) before being reduced by later Sufis to mere allegories for Ibn Arabi's philosophy.

Because the legal notion of blasphemy was not clearly defined in Islamic law, shathiyat were treated inconsistently by legal authorities. This inconsistency was heightened by legal and political issues between jurists and mystics, as well as through the difference in their interpretations of Islamic law. Which, in practice, subsumed apostasy in the category of zandaqa, viewing heresy as a political crime, shathiyat were prosecuted only when it was desired by political authorities. At times, in cases where ecstatic utterances hadn't been made in public spaces, they were still being interpreted as religious blasphemy, where Sufi Mystics were being treated as martyrs of religious utterance. Thus, such prosecutions mostly resulted from “personal vendetta, subversion of the state and party factionalism”. Because of their opposition to religious norms, these ecstatic utterances play an important role in the conception of Islamic Antinomianism.

== Famous Examples of Shath ==
- "Praise be to me, how great is my majesty” by Bayazid Bastami (d. 874)
- “I am the Truth” by Mansur Al-Hallaj. This example of shath is famously interpreted by Muslim Legalists at the time (~911-922 AD) as heresy; they saw his claim as a challenge to divinity, whereas his followers explained Al-Hallaj's state of consciousness as one of union with divinity.
- "Ritual acts are only impurities," Abu Bakr al-Shibli (d. 945)
- "In my robe, there is only God," Abu Sa'id Abu'l-Khayr (d. 1048)

== Modern Interpretations of Shath ==
- "Shatah is an interpretation of what the soul learns when understanding divinity; So that your understanding is that your God is your God," (Badti, 1978: 10)
- A Wittgensteinian interpretation reads shath as ecstatic utterances bound by the context of "language games" that transcend conventional logic to convey spiritual truths through their own internal rules. (2024)

== See also ==
- Ayn al-Quzat Hamadani
- Crazy wisdom
- Divine ecstasy
- Ruzbihan Baqli
- Sarmad Kashani

== Bibliography ==
- Ernst, Carl W. (1985). Words of Ecstasy in Sufism. Albany: State University of New York Press. ISBN 0-87395-917-5.
