= Asrar (disambiguation) =

Asrar is a daily newspaper in Iran. It may also refer to

== People ==
- Asrar (name)

== Publications ==
- Asrar-i-Khudi, philosophical poetry book of Allama Iqbal
- Asrar al-Tawhid, book about the Sufi mystic Abu Sa'id Abu'l-Khayr
- Kashf al-Asrar (1943), book by Ruhollah Khomeini
- Makhzan ol-Asrar, Persian poem book by Nizami Ganjavi
