= Sufi literature =

Tradition of Islamic mystic writing

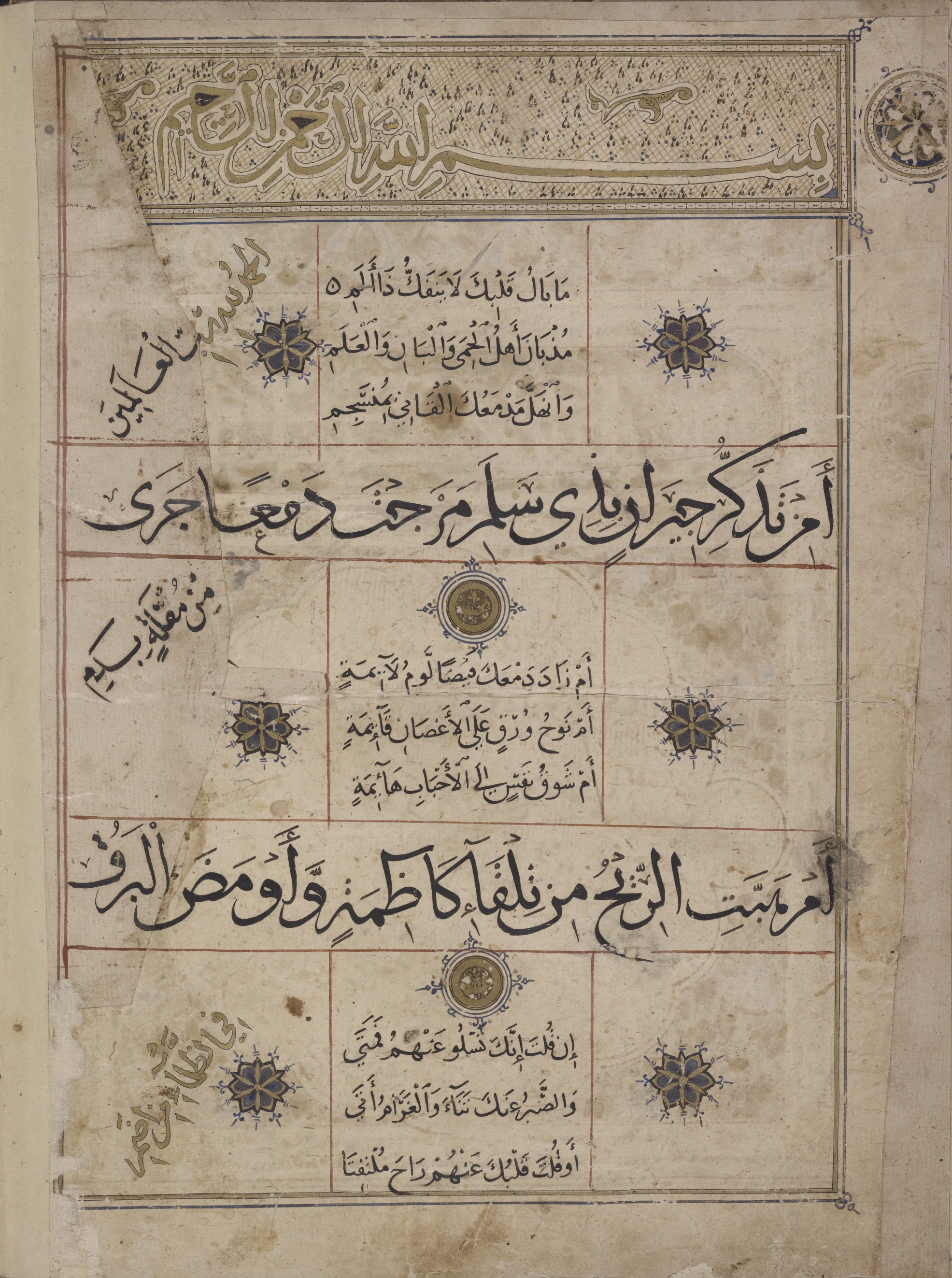
Page from a 1381 copy of the Kawākib al-durrīya of al-Būṣīrī (d. 1294)

Sufi literature consists of works in various languages that express and advocate the ideas of Sufism.

Sufism had an important influence on medieval literature, especially poetry, that was written in Arabic, Persian, Punjabi, Turkic, Sindhi and Urdu. Sufi doctrines and organizations provided more freedom to literature than did the court poetry of the period. The Sufis borrowed elements of folklore in their literature.

The works of Nizami, Nava'i, Hafez, Sam'ani and Jami were more or less related to Sufism. The verse of such Sufi poets as Sanai (died c. 1140), Attar (born c. 1119), and Rumi (died 1273) protested against oppression with an emphasis on divine justice and criticized evil rulers, religious fanaticism and the greed and hypocrisy of the orthodox Muslim clergy. The poetic forms used by these writers were similar to the folk song, parable and fairy tale. Authors of Sufi folk literature particularly borrowed preexisting poetic forms, songs, and narrative structure to make Sufi ideas accessible to their audience.

While Sufi literature is primarily associated with poetry, poetry itself is not a distinct genre of Sufi literature. Two major genres in Sufi literature are manuals, devotional texts intended to instruct the reader in either theology or practice, and teaching stories, which are intended to teach a specific mindset.

== History ==
Sufi literature, written in Persian, flourished from the 12th to 15th centuries. Later, major poets linked with the Sufi tradition included Hatef Esfahani (17th century), Bedil (18th century), and Ahmad NikTalab (20th century). However, Sufi literature for the longest time in history had been scattered in different languages and geographic regions. From the 19th and 20th centuries onwards, the historiography of Sufism, especially in the west, has been the meticulous collection of diverse sources and facts regarding the subject. As compared to, say, broadly speaking, English or German literature, Sufi literature has been controversial because of the origin of Sufism itself as a tradition. Some scholars argue Sufism is a tendency within Islam whereas others argue that Sufism, as in the way of thinking, predates Islam. Radical Islamic scholars of an older generation, some even in contemporary times, dismiss the Sufi tradition as something that is purely mystical and therefore deny Sufism's spiritual lineage to Islam. Their argument is Sufism comes in the way of recognising the true nature of Islam. Nevertheless, the process of accumulating data on Sufism by many European Orientalist scholars led to the birth of significant discourses within Sufi literature that dominated western thought on the subject for a long time. Even before the 19th century, as argued by Carl Ernst, some Orientalist scholars attempted to disassociate Sufi literature from Islam, based on positive and negative tendencies. In his work, Ernst challenges such interpretations and those made by the colonial Orientalists and native fundamentalists.

Alexander D. Knysh, a professor of Islamic studies at the University of Michigan, claims the first serious attempts to address Sufism in academic discourses can be traced back to the 17th century. The discussions by scholars in the west around this time were concerned with critically analysing and translating the Sufi literature. Notably, the literary output of renowned Persian poets such as Sadi, Attar, Rumi, Jami, and Hafez. However, Knysch also points out a rather contrasting image of Sufism that appears within the personal memoirs and travelogues of western travellers in the Middle East and Central Asia in the 18th and 19th centuries. Mostly produced by western travellers, colonial administrators, and merchants, they perceived Sufi literature and the overall tradition as exotic, erratic behaviour, and strange practices by the dervishes. In such works, literary concerns were mixed with a larger goal to illustrate a systematic and accurate account of various Sufi communities, practices, and doctrines. Although such scholars were intrigued by the nature of Sufi literature and many of the individual Sufi dervishes, they were hesitant in considering the mystical elements of Sufism to be something inherent to the larger Islamic religion. This is because they did not consider Islam and Christianity in the same light and therefore considered Islam to be incapable of producing the kind of theological discussions present within Sufi literature. For instance, Joseph Garcin de Tassy (1794–1878), a French Orientalist, translated and produced a large number of works on Islamic, Persian, and Hindustani discourses. He admired the Persian language and literature yet showed a conventional anti-Islamic prejudice notable of his time. He perceived Sufi literature vis-à-vis Christian heretics but considered the former as a distorted version of the latter. He thought Islamic cultures restrict human autonomy and material pleasures. Such views on Sufi literature were commonly shared at the time by several European Orientalists who were originally trained as either philologists or Biblical studies scholars.

Sufi poetry emerged as a form of mystical Islamic devotional literature that expresses themes such as divine love and the mystical union between man and God, often through the metaphors of secular love poetry. Over the centuries, non-mystical poetry has in turn made significant use of the Sufi vocabulary, producing a mystical-secular ambiguity in Persian, Turkish, and Urdu-language literatures.

== Themes ==
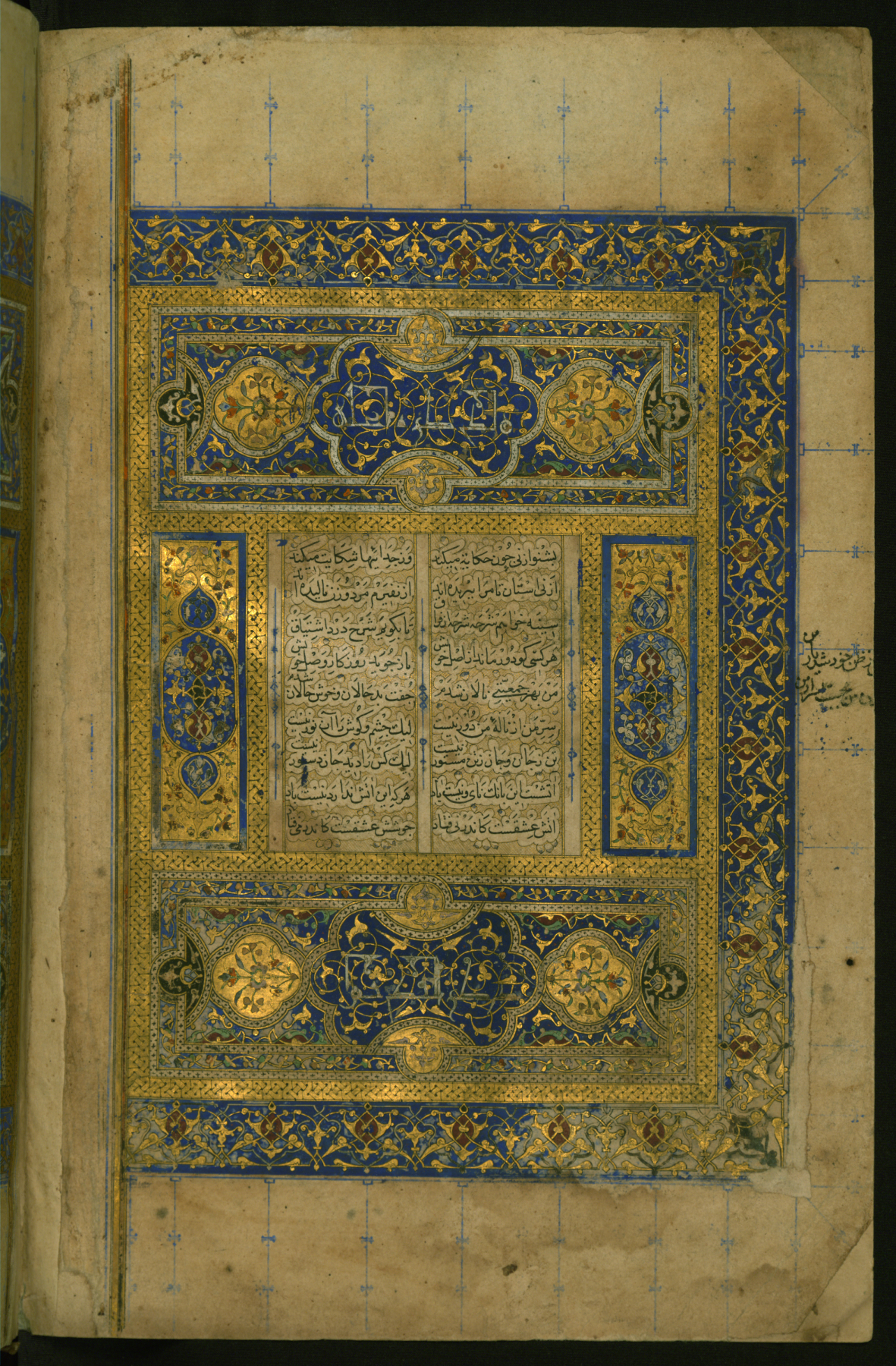
Illuminated frontispiece of the poetry of Rumi, c. 1461

The Sufi conception of love, Ishq, was introduced first by Rabia of Basra, a female mystic from the eighth century. Throughout Rumi's work, "death" and "love" appear as the dual aspects of Rumi's conception of self-knowledge. Love is understood to be "all-consuming" in that it encompasses the whole personality of the lover. The influence of this tradition in Sufism was likely drawn from Persian or Hindu sources; no comparable idea is known from ninth century Christianity or Judaism. In a literary wordplay Fakhreddin Eraqi changed the words of the shahada (la ilaha illa'llah) to la ilaha illa'l-'ishq ("there is no deity save Love"). Rumi, in his writings, developed the concept of love as a direct manifestation of the will of God, in part as a calculated response to objections from the orthodox wing of Islam: "Not a single lover would seek union if the beloved were not seeking it". The concepts of unity and oneness of mankind also appear in Rumi's works, including the poem "Who Am I?"

== Genres ==
=== Sufi manuals ===
Sufi manuals refer to texts intended to instruct the reader about Sufi practices and morality. This genre includes early Sufi texts used to justify Sufi practices through the Qu'ran and the Hadith, as well as later works focused on the instruction of Sufis in specific religious practices. Not all Sufi manuals were written by Sufis: al-Kalabadhi's Kitāb al-ta'arruf li-madhhab ahl al-tasawwuf is one text that contemporary scholars such as Saeko Yazaki and Jawid Mojaddedi have argued is not the work of a devout Sufi.

Most early Sufi manuals were written between the late tenth and early twelfth centuries. These texts emphasize Sufism's basis in Islamic piety and were primarily written by scholars of the Hadith, like al-Sulami. As such, they tend to be more theoretical in nature and were not intended to instruct Sufis in practice. Later works, including Mostamli's commentary on al-Kalabadhi, provide more detail on specific Sufi practices.

Sufi manuals reflect what practices and beliefs were considered controversial when the texts were composed. The "intoxicated" school of early Sufism engaged in practices, including shath, that were considered blasphemous by other groups in Islam; various authors of Sufi manuals, including al-Sarraj, used their texts to justify the practice. Some later texts would do the same for other contemporary controversial practices (such as silent dhikr in Sohravardi's work), while authors like Hojviri attempted to explain what practices were considered more or less acceptable.

In the 18th and 19th centuries, some Sufi manuals became works intended for instruction but not for critical analysis. Waleed Ziad's examination of Sufi manuals written during the Durrani Empire describes these works as "step-by-step guides to spiritual progress", as they are intended for aiding the reader in instructing others in Sufi practice.

=== Teaching stories ===
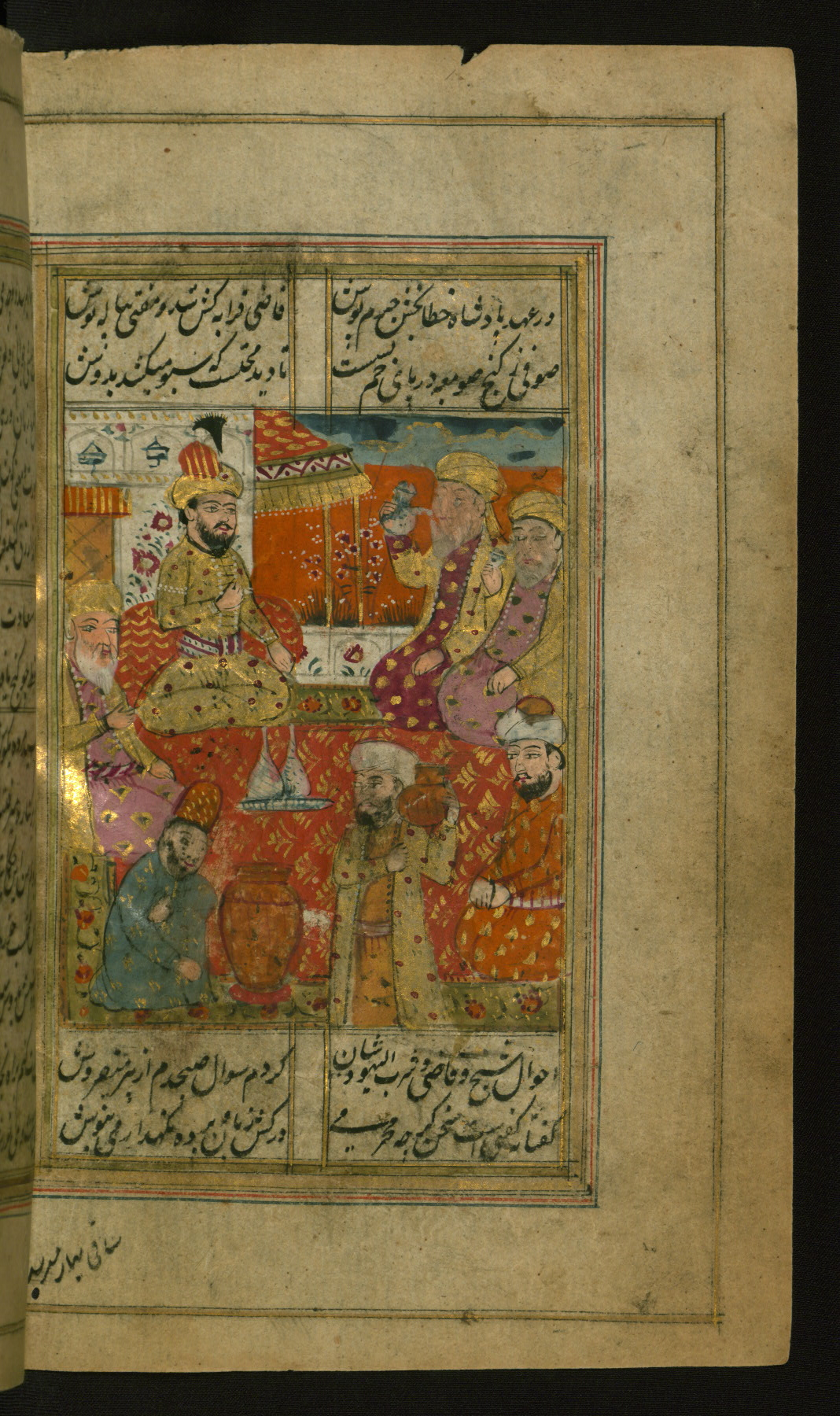
A page from an illuminated manuscript of Hafiz's Divan.

Sufi teaching stories, also called wisdom tales, are a genre commonly used in the instruction of Sufis. Rumi's Mathnavi is one work considered a classic of the genre; other famous authors of teaching stories include Attar, al-Ghazali, and Jami. In more modern times, Idries Shah was notable for popularizing teaching stories in Western culture through works like Pleasantries of the Incredible Mulla Nasrudin. Wisdom tales are popular outside of their use in religious instruction because they are often humorous in nature, although scholars like Nancy Shields Hardin dispute that humor is a necessary component of the teaching story.

The stories are intended to teach students to intuit information that they would not be able to normally; this is done through making the students change their mindset. For this reason, stories are considered more effective when told orally as opposed to when read. Sufi teaching stories often have situations that may come across as construed an artificial: in one, a Yogi (who aspires to live in a way that does no harm to other living creatures) asking a Sufi to share the how a fish saved his life, only for the Sufi to reveal that the fish saved his life because it was a filling meal. One explanation for why the stories use situations like these as a means to impart knowledge is that it makes students more comfortable with uncertainty. Other explanations include these situations serve as understandable metaphors for esoteric religious concepts, or that there is less mental resistance to the metaphors because the situations are not immediately recognized as metaphors.

== Sufi folk literature ==
Folk literature is a genre of Sufi literature that historians like Richard M. Eaton associate with the early spread of Islam in South Asia. It is called folk literature because its primary audience was rural, illiterate Indians who would not have been able to understand Arabic and Persian Islamic texts. Folk literature is part of a larger tradition of folk Islam, in which local traditions and stories are used to make Islam and its ideas more familiar. The folk tradition in India was disliked by Muslim elites who considered it impure, including the ulama, who disliked that Islamic ideas (including surahs) were being conveyed in languages that were not Arabic or Persian. Prior to the 17th century, most Sufi poets who were composing in local languages would often start their poems with an apology for working in a "profane" language.

Deccani Sufi folk poetry is a notable subgenre of Sufi folk literature, as it primarily used songs that women sung while performing household chores to convey a simplified version of Islamic and Sufi theology. While Sufi folk literature throughout the Indian subcontinent used popular poetic forms, Eaton theorized that Islam and Sufi concepts spread more easily in the Deccan population because the poetic forms were popular among women, therefore making Sufi poetry a part of daily life. Sufi folk poetry instructs the reciter and the audience on Islamic practices; one example is the usage of dhikr to time parts of the spinning process in a popular Deccani song.

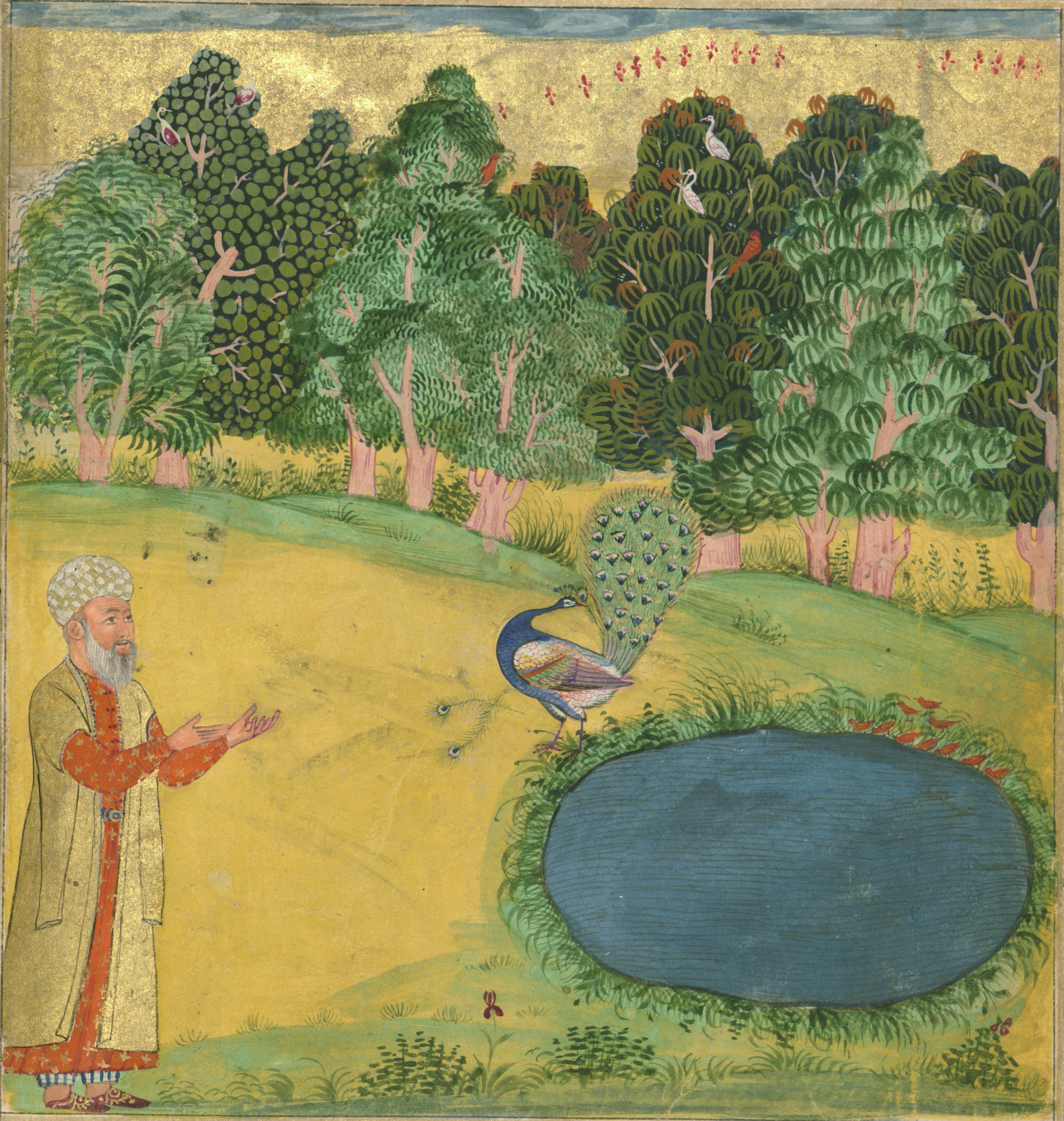
A detail from an Indian illuminated manuscript of Rumi's Mathnavi.

Motifs common to Sufi folk literature in the Indian subcontinent include the usage of symbols common to Indian literature, such as the lotus flower; the naming of specific Sufi saints as role models for the audience; a non-dualitistic understanding of divinity; emphasis on unity with God but not on more esoteric Sufi ideas; and dhikr as a devotional rather than mystical practice.

A popular subgenre of Sufi folk literature in the Indian subcontinent is the premakhyan or Sufi romance. The Sufi romance is a genre that uses a love story to teach about divine love (Ishq). These romances often followed the pattern of pre-existing Indian stories in which a woman is waiting for her husband and undergoes a physical journey to be reunited with him; the woman represents the soul, her husband represents God, and the physical journey is a metaphor for experiencing a spiritual journey to unite with God. Sufi romances also draw from the Persian mathnavi. One example of a Sufi romance is Chandayan, which was composed by Mulla Daud c.1379.

== Notable works ==
- The Mathnawī and Diwan-e Shams-e Tabriz-i of Rūmī
- Dīwān of Hāfez by Hafiz Shirazi
- Fuṣūṣ-ul-Ḥikam ("The Bezels of Wisdom") and Tarjumān al-Ashwāq ("The Interpreter of Desires") by Ibn Arabi
- Kimiya-yi sa'ādat ("The Alchemy of Happiness") by Al-Ghazali
- The Conference of the Birds by Farid al-Din Attar
- The Dīwān of Yūnūs by Yunus Emre
- The Qaṣīdat-ul-Burda ("Poem of the Mantle") of al-Buṣīrī
- Asrār-ut-Tawḥīd ("The Secrets of Unity") by Shaikh Abū Sa`īd Abū-l-Khair
- al-Fatḥ al-mubīn fī madḥ al-amīn ("Clear Inspiration, on Praise of the Trusted One") by ʿĀ’ishah bint Yūsuf al-Bāʿūniyyah
- Diwan-e-Akhtar by Hazrat Hakim Akhtar
- Dala’il al-Barakat by Muhammad Tahir ul-Qadri
- Kulliyyat-e-Hasrat by Muhammad Abdul Qadeer Siddiqi Qadri 'Hasrat'
- Lataife Ashrafi by Ashraf Jahangir Semnani
- Tassawwuff by Syed Waheed Ashraf
- The poems of Sultan Bahu
- Some poems of Ahmad NikTalab

== See also ==
- Arabic literature
- Bektashi Order
  - Alevism
  - Bektashism in Albania
  - Haji Bektash Veli
  - Janissary
- History of Sufism
- Islamic poetry
- Mehfil
- Na'at
- Nasheed
- Persian literature
- Qawwali
- Turco-Mongol tradition
- Wali
