= Al-Hamziyya =

Ode of praise for the Islamic prophet Muhammad

- Author: Al-Busiri
- Original title: Arabic: قصيدة الهمزية
- Language: Arabic
- Subject: Madeeh
- Publication date: 13th century
- Pages: 457 verses
- ISBN: 9782745167651
- OCLC: 39264211

Qasīdat al-Hamziyya (Arabic: قصيدة الهمزية), or al-Hamziyya for short, is a thirteenth-century ode of praise for the Islamic prophet Muhammad composed by the eminent Sufi mystic Imam al-Busiri of Egypt.

This poem was written according to the metre of Bahr Khafif in Arabic poetry, and it is composed of 457 verses.

In 2025, Sandala Inc. and Abu Zahra Press, Inc. published an annotated English translation of the complete Hamziyyah, introduced by a comprehensive essay that places the poem in a wider ethical and historical context, by American Muslim scholar Hamza Yusuf.

== See also ==
- Al-Busiri
- Al-Burda
- Madeeh
- Durood
- Islamic poetry
