= ABZ =

Abz or ABZ may refer to:

- Abz Love, English singer and member of boy band Five
- Abdullah bin Zayed Al Nahyan
- Aberdeen Airport in Scotland, UK (IATA code ABZ)
- Abr (also known as Abz), a village in Semnan Province, Iran
- Abui language, a Trans-New Guinean language of Indonesia
- Albendazole, a drug for the treatment of worm infestations
- Asian Boyz, an Asian American gang
