= Abu al-Hassan al-Kharaqani =

Iranian Sufi (963–1033)

Abu 'l-Hassan Ali ibn Ahmad (or ibn Jaʻfar) ibn Salmān al-Kharaqāni (Persian: شیخ ابوالحسن خرقانی) was one of the master Sufis of Islam. He was born in 963 (352 Hijri year) of Persian parents in Khorasan in the village of Qaleh Now-e Kharaqan (today located in Semnan Province, Iran near Bastam) and died on the day of Ashura in 1033 (10th Muharram, 425 Hijri).

He was the disciple of Abul-Abbas Qassab Amoli but claimed a deep spiritual relationship with Bayazid Bastami, a Sufi Master who died almost a century before him but was said to have spoken about Kharaqani's personality. He was also influenced by Abul Hasan Hankari. His school of jurisprudence was Shafi‘i.

Attar of Nishapur, a Persian poet and Sufi, devoted a large part of his book Tadhkirat al-Awliya (Biography of the Saints) about Kharaqani. Attar has him as Sultān-e Salātin-e Mashāyekh "King of kings of Sufi Masters", "Ocean of the spiritual knowledge, "Sun of the Lord", "Mystery of the Lord" and "Qibla of his people".

Kharaqani was the Master of the Arab Sufi and poet, Abdullah Ansari. Avicenna, Mahmud of Ghazni, Abū-Sa'īd Abul-Khayr and Nasir Khusraw travelled to Kharaqan to meet him and expressed their deep admiring feelings and respect for him.

Rumi, Attar of Nishapur, Khwaja Abdullah Ansari and Jami narrated poems about Kharaqani and reported his stories. He was illiterate but had wide inspirational knowledge about the Quran and Hadith; his sayings and speeches were significant due to their philosophical views.

The book Nūr al-ʿUlūm "Light of the Sciences" was dedicated to Kharaqani. It is believed to have been written by his murids after his death. A single manuscript copy is currently held in the British Museum.

== Poetry and translations ==
- Radical Love: Teachings from the Islamic Mystical Tradition translated and edited by Omid Safi. New Haven: Yale University Press, 2018. Contains a selection of al-Kharaqani's poetry in English.
