= Abul-Abbas Qassab Amoli =

11th-century Iranian Sufi mystic

Abul Abbas Ahmad ibn Muhammad ibn Abdul-Karim Qassab Amoli also known as Qassab Amuli (Persian: ابوالعباس قصاب آملی) was an 11th-century Iranian Sufi mystic. Coming from Tabaristan, he was of the tribe of Javan and his father was a butcher. Qassab Amoli had a monastery and a school in Amol. Qassab Amoli was a master of Abu al-Hassan al-Kharaqani and Abu Said Abul-Khayr.Suhrawardi, it says about her is considered among the most important scholars of history.Attar of Nishapur has mentioned in Tazkirat al-Awliya, he was a miracle in seeing the defects of the soul, and he had a great sign of discipline, dignity and sincerity Amoli, as stated in Nafahat al-Nas, he apparently first went to Baghdad and met Abu Bakr al-Shibli, and from there he went to Mecca, from Mecca to Medina and from there to Bait al-Maqdis.
