= Islamic poetry =

Poetry written by Muslims

Islamic poetry is a form of spoken word and written literature composed by adherents of Islam. The tradition is fundamentally rooted in Arabic, the foundational language of Islamic literature, and has subsequently flourished in many other languages such as Persian, Urdu, Bengali, and Turkish.

Genres of Islamic poetry trace their origins to classical forms. Key genres include the qasida, a highly structured classical poem or "ode" that spread globally alongside the Arab Muslim expansion; the Ghazal, which evolved historically from the qasida to become a distinct poetic expression of the pain of loss or separation and the beauty of love; Ginans, devotional hymns recited by Ismailis; and blank verse (shi'r musal).

== History and origins ==
Islamic poetry is a literary tradition that developed across the Muslim world in Arabic, Persian, Turkish, Urdu, and other languages.

The transition from the pre-Islamic period (the Jahiliyyah) to the early Islamic era marked a shift in the cultural role of poetry. The Quran established a new spiritual framework that superseded the tribal authority of pagan poets. Concurrently, early Muslims actively adapted the traditional qasida (ode) structure to serve the Islamic context.

During the life of the Prophet Muhammad, prominent poets such as Hassan ibn Thabit and Ka'b ibn Zuhayr composed classical odes defending the Muslim community and praising the Prophet, gaining his direct approval. These early adaptations established the foundation for a vast tradition of Islamic literature. Subsequent generations utilized the structural and rhetorical devices of classical Arabic poetry to explore themes of devotion and mysticism across the Islamic world.

== Islamic poetry by language ==
=== English ===
In English, Islamic poetry now tends to be free-form (un-rhymed). Current Muslim poets in English include Rafey Habib, Joel Hayward, Dawud Wharnsby, and the late Daniel Moore.

=== Arabic ===
In Arabic poetry, the qasida ("ode") is considered by scholars to be one of its most distinguishing aspects. Originating around 500 BC, it is also considered to be fundamental to the development of pre-Islamic poetry. It is composed in monorhyme having between fifteen and eighty lines. The qasida contains three subtopics or recurring themes; the nasib or the story of a destroyed relationship and home, the fakhr which portrays self-praise for a tribe or oneself, and the rahil which is a journey into the desert involving camels.

The qasida also involves biographical anecdotes called akhbar, which shows stories of revenge-taking and blood-sacrifice necessary to go through a rite of passage. The major components of the akhbar are the recurring themes of blood-revenge, initiated by the death of a father or loved one, and the "arrested development" of a person during their youth.

Example of a nasib poem:

Effaced are the abodes,
brief encampments and long-settled ones;
At Mina the wilderness has claimed
Mount Ghawl and Mount Rijam.
The torrent channels of Mount Rayyan,
Their teachings are laid bare,
Preserved as surely as inscriptions are
preserved in rock,
Dung-darkened patches over which,
since they were peopled, years elapsed,
Their profane mouths and sacred ones
have passed away.
They were watered by the rain
the spring stars bring,
And on them fell the rain of thunderclouds,
downpour and drizzle...

— Labid ibn Rabi'ah

The common theme of pre-Islamic Arabic poetry is the description of Bedouin life, the stories of rites of passage and sacrifice, depicted through imagery and the use of metaphors. This was mostly oral in composition until the third century.

With the establishment of Islam, the classical Arabic poetic framework was actively adopted to articulate the new religious identity. The qasida evolved to encompass core Islamic genres such as Madih Nabawi (prophetic praise), Zuhdiyyat (ascetic poetry), and later Sufi devotion. Seminal works, including Ka'b ibn Zuhayr's Bānat Suʿād—recited in the presence of the Prophet Muhammad—and Al-Busiri's Qasida al-Burda, cemented Arabic as the definitive language of Islamic poetic expression.

=== Persian ===
Genres in classical Persian poetry were significantly shaped by the adaptation of established Arabic forms. The ghazal, derived from the Arabic poetic tradition, developed in Persian as a love-themed poem typically composed of seven to twelve verses in a monorhyme scheme. The qasida, fundamentally a classical Arabic ode, was also adopted into Persian to depict themes of spiritual praise, worldly patronage, or satire. In the context of Islamic poetry, Persian qasidas are predominantly used to praise Muhammad and his family, or to emphasize the divine attributes of Allah. Visual poetry is occasionally utilized in this tradition to arrange letters and phrases into shapes reflecting the poem's central theme.

=== Bengali ===
Bengali poetry originating in the 15th century explores themes of Islamic cosmology, historical battles, spirituality, and the internal struggle with the nafs ("self"). The historical works of Shah Muhammad Saghir, Alaol, Abdul Hakim, Syed Sultan, and Daulat Qazi integrated Bengali folk poetry with Perso-Arabian stories and themes, forming an essential component of the Muslim culture of Bengal. Modern Bengali Islamic poetry tends to shift away from classical rhetorical and romantic compositions.

=== Punjabi ===
Punjabi poetry addresses the internal conflict caused by worldly attachments and the pursuit of spiritual truth. A recurring theme is the distancing effect of material wealth and worldly knowledge from true religious meaning. Written predominantly with Perso-Arabic script and vocabulary, Punjabi poetry ranges from romances to satires, heavily influenced by rural and village lifestyles.

== See also ==
=== Poetry ===
- Poetry
  - History of poetry
  - List of poets

=== Islam ===
- Glossary of Islam
- Outline of Islam
- Index of Islam-related articles

=== Literature ===
- Literature
  - Islamic literature
  - Sufi literature
  - Literature of al-Andalus
  - Literature of Iran
  - Literature of Turkey
  - Literature of Pakistan
  - Literature of Bangladesh
  - Literature of Indonesia
  - Literature of Somalia
