= Asrar (name) =

Asrar is a name and surname of Arabic origin. Notable people with the name include:

== Given name ==
- Asrar (musician) (born 1985), Pakistani musical artist
- Asrar-ul-Haq (1911–1955), known as Majaz, Indian Urdu poet

== Surname ==
- Ghassem Asrar, Iranian-American scientist
- Mahmud A. Asrar (born 1976), Pakistani Turkish comic book artist

== See also ==
- Asrar (disambiguation)
