= I Cannot Write My Life =

2023 non-fiction book

I Cannot Write My Life: Islam, Arabic, and Slavery in Omar ibn Said's America
- Author: Mbaye Lo and Carl W Ernst
- Published: 2023 (University of North Carolina Press)
- ISBN: 978-1-4696-7466-7

I Cannot Write My Life: Islam, Arabic, and Slavery in Omar ibn Said's America is a non-fiction book by Mbaye Lo and Carl W. Ernst about the autobiography of Omar ibn Said. It was published in 2023 by the University of North Carolina Press.

== General references ==
- Gable, Eric (2025). "Review of *I Cannot Write My Life: Islam, Arabic, and Slavery in Omar ibn Said's America*, by Mbaye Lo and Carl W. Ernst". Africa: The Journal of the International African Institute. 95 (1): 120–122.
- "I Cannot Write My Life: Islam, Arabic, and Slavery in Omar ibn Said's America by Mbaye Lo, Carl W Ernst". Publishers weekly. August 2023.
- Marr, Timothy (2025-06-16). "I Cannot Write My Life: Islam, Arabic, and Slavery in Omar ibn Said's America". Journal of American History. 112 (1): 160–161. doi:10.1093/jahist/jaaf017. ISSN 0021-8723.
- Steelman, Ben. "New book delves into the remarkable life of an enslaved man who lived in Wilmington". Wilmington Star-News.
