= Al-Busiri =

Sufi poet (1212–1294)

Abu Abdullah Muhammad ibn Sa'id al-Busiri al-Sanhaji
- أبو عبد الله محمد بن سعيد بن حماد الصنهاجي البوصيري
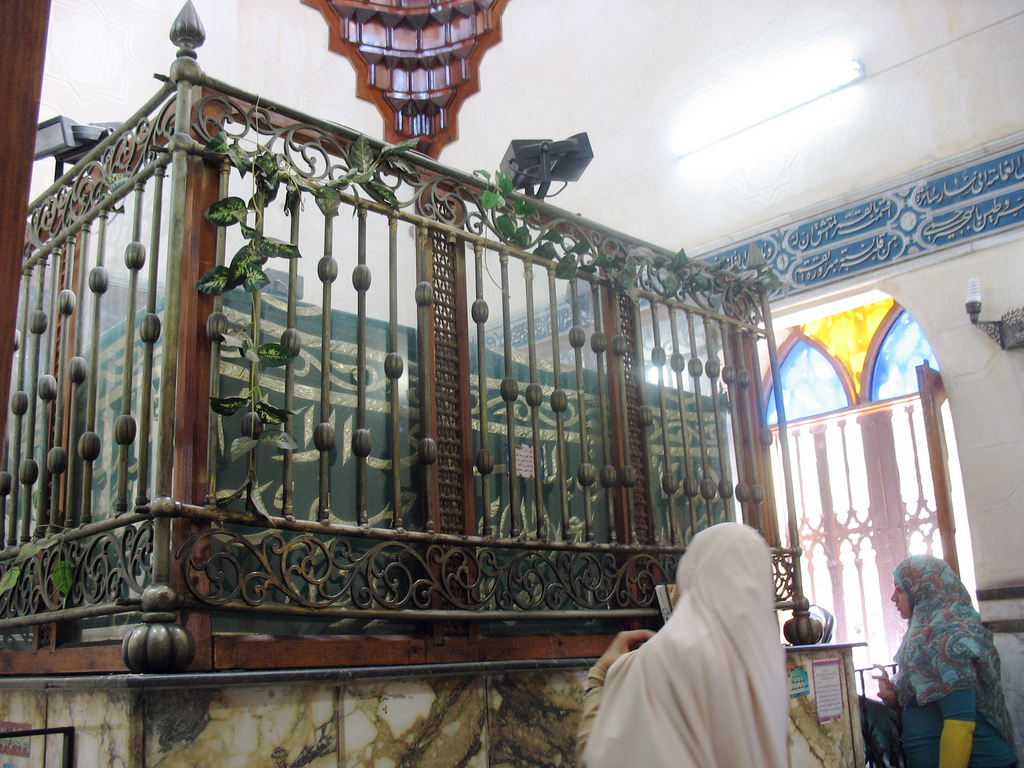
- The tomb of al-Busiri in Alexandria, Egypt
- Born: 1212; Dalāṣ, Beni Suef, Egypt
- Died: 1294 (aged 81–82); Alexandria, Egypt
- Occupations: Poet, Sufi mystic
- Writing career
- Language: Arabic
- Genres: Sufi poetry
- Notable works: Al-Burda (Poem of the Mantle), Al-Hamziyya
- Movement: Shadhili

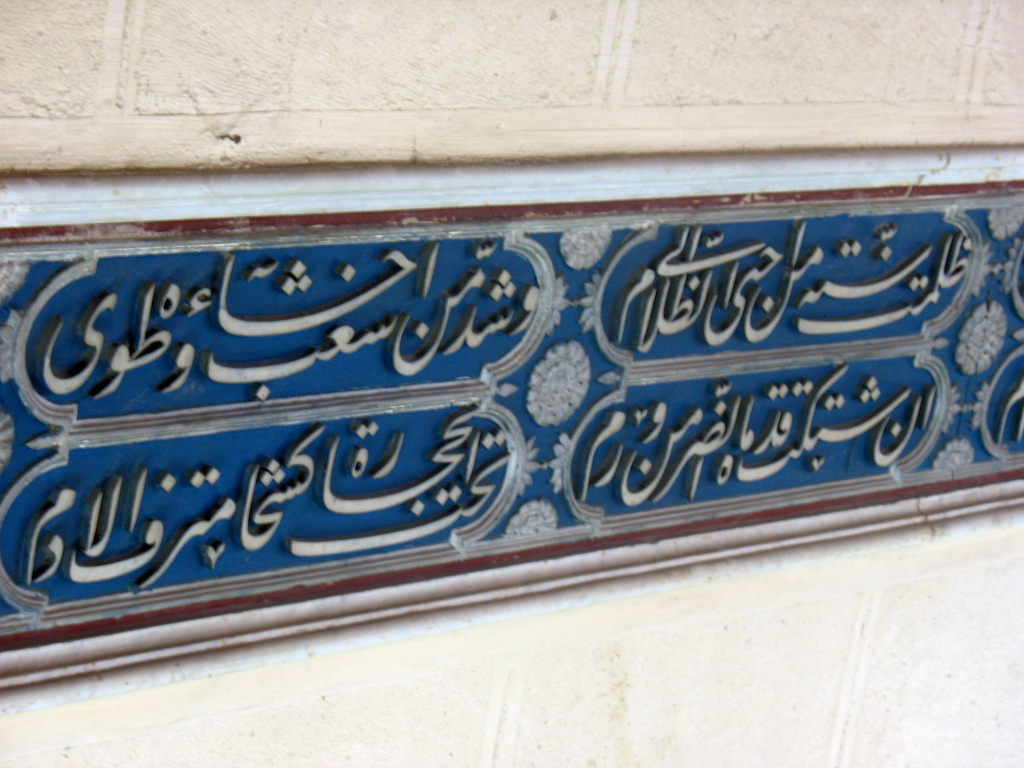
A verse from al-Busiri's poem al-Burda on the wall of his shrine in Alexandria

Al-Būṣīrī (Arabic: أبو عبد الله محمد بن سعيد بن حماد الصنهاجي البوصيري, romanized: Abū ʿAbdallāh Muhammad ibn Saʿīd al-Ṣanhājī al-Būṣīrī; 1212–1294) was a Sanhaji Sufi Sunni Muslim poet belonging to the Shadhili, and a direct disciple of the Sufi saint Abu al-Abbas al-Mursi. His magnum opus, the Qaṣīda al-Burda "Poem of the Mantle" in praise of Prophet Muhammad is one of the most popular Islamic poems of the genre. It is in Arabic, as is his other ode named "Al-Hamziyya".

== Biography ==
He was born in Dalāṣ, a small town in Beni Suef Governorate in Egypt (despite the similar name, this town is not to be confused with Dellys, in Algeria), and wrote under the patronage of Ibn Hinna, the vizier. His father was from Abusir, hence his nisba Al-Būṣīrī. Sometimes, he also used the nisba Dalāṣīrī as his mother belonged to the town of Dalāṣ.

In his al-Burda, he claims that Muhammad cured him of paralysis by appearing to him in a dream and wrapping him in a mantle. The poem has had a unique history (cf. Ignác Goldziher in Revue de l'histoire des religions, vol. xxxi. pp. 304 ff.). It has been frequently edited and made the basis for other poems, and new poems have been made by interpolating four or six lines after each line of the original. It has been published with English translation by Faizullabhai (Bombay, 1893), with French translation by René Basset (Paris, 1894), with German translation by C. A. Ralfs (Vienna, 1860), and in other languages elsewhere.

== See also ==
- List of Sufis
- List of Sufi saints
