= Ruzbihan Baqli: Mysticism and the Rhetoric of Sainthood in Persian Sufism =

1996 book by Carl W. Ernst

- Authors: Carl W. Ernst
- Language: English
- Subject: Ruzbihan Baqli
- Publisher: Curzon Press
- Publication date: 1996
- Publication place: United Kingdom
- Pages: 207

Ruzbihan Baqli: Mysticism and the Rhetoric of Sainthood in Persian Sufism is a book-length study of Ruzbihan Baqli by Carl W. Ernst. The book was awarded the Farabi Award.

== Reception ==
The book has been reviewed in the International Journal of Middle East Studies. Leonard Lewisohn calls the book "of key importance to the study of Ruzbihan well into the next century."
