= Ruzbihan Baqli =

Persian poet, mystic, and Sufi

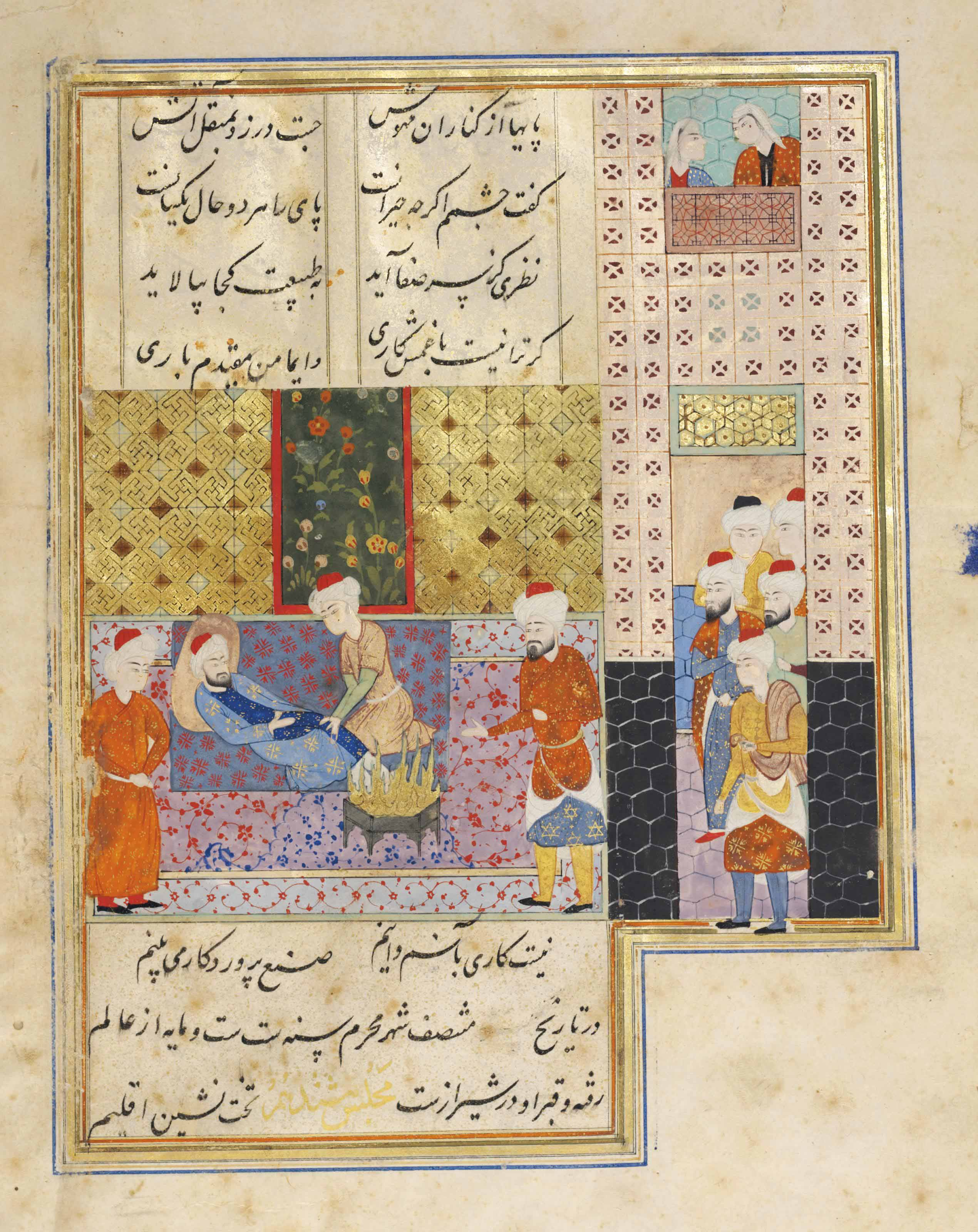
Ruzbihan Baqli reclining before a brazier. From a manuscript made in 16th-century Safavid Iran

Abu Muhammad Sheikh Ruzbehan Baqli (1128–1209) (Persian: روزبهان ابو محمد بن ابی نصر بن روزبهان بقْلی فسایی شیرازی; full name Rūzbihān Abū Muḥammad ibn Abī Naṣr ibn Rūzbihān Baqlī Fasāyī Shīrāzī) was a Persian poet, mystic, teacher and sufi master. He wrote about his own life as well as published commentaries on Sufi poets and ideas.

Baqli's most renowned work was his autobiography Unveiling of Secrets or Kashf al-asrār.

== Life ==
Ruzbihan Baqli was born in 1128 to a family of Daylamite origin in Fasa in what is today Iran. As a teenager, Baqli worked as a grocer. Although Baqli claimed to have had religious visions at ages three, seven, and fifteen, he said that his family was not religious. He described these visions as dreams and powerful ecstasies in The Unveiling of Secrets.

At age 15, Baqli left Fasa to spend 18 months in the desert, during which time he claimed to receive more visions. After leaving the desert, he joined a Sufi order. In The Unveiling of Secrets, Baqli says he had his first "unveiling" while training with the Sufis. He eventually returned to Fasa to seek a master and spiritual guide. There he met and became a disciple of Shaykh Jamal al-Din Abi al-Wafaʾ ibn Khalil al-Fasayi.

It is speculated that Baqli spent the next years travelling to Syria, Iraq, Kerman in Iran, Arabia, making the hajj twice. He returned to Shiraz in 1165 and set up a hospice where he taught for fifty years. He married several wives and had two sons and three daughters.

Baqli died in 1209 in Shiraz.

== Legacy ==
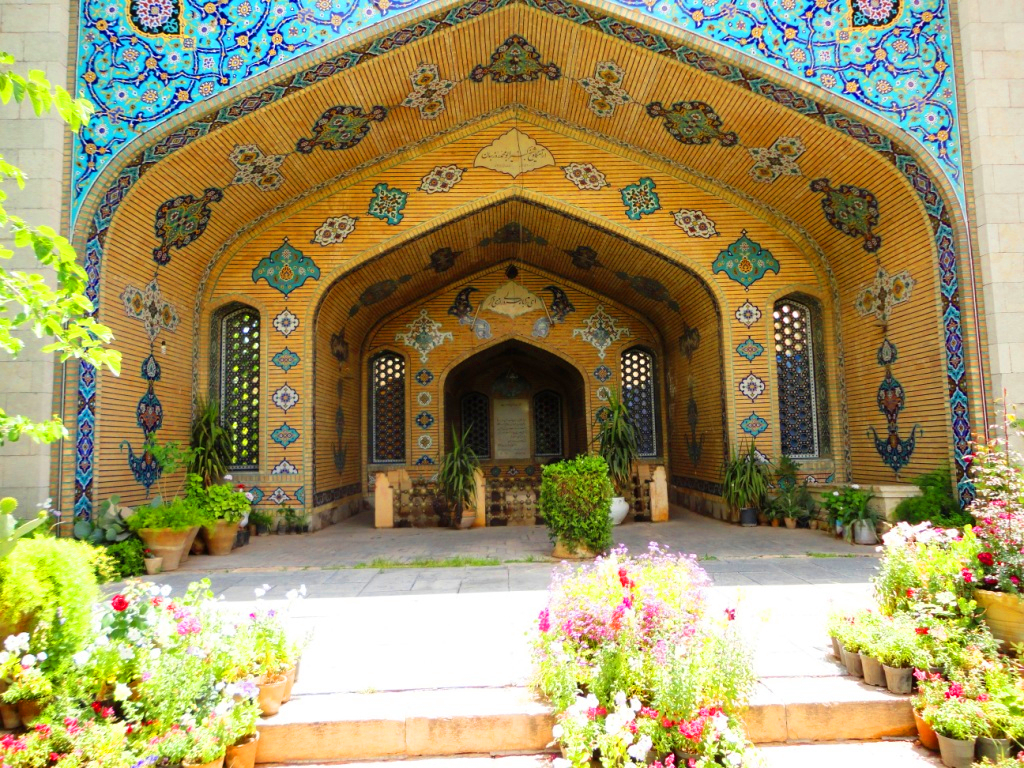
Tomb of Ruzbihan Baqli in Shiraz, Iran

Baqli's center for Sufi training and his teachings remained popular several generations after his death. Ruzbihan Baqli died in 1209 in Shiraz and was placed in a tomb in his ribat. For several generations after his death, Ruzbihan Baqli's legacy as a Sufi master continued and Shiraz became a place of pilgrimage. However, the popularity of his order waned and eventually disappeared and his tomb fell into disrepair.

In 1972, Baqli's tomb was restored by the Iranian Department of Antiquities.

The two most important hagiographies about him were written by family members almost a century after his death: The Gift to the People of Gnosis, in Memory of the Chief Axis of the World, Ruzbihan (1300); and The Spirit of the Gardens, on the Life of the Master Ruzbihan (1305). Some groups in the Middle East, Central Asia, India, and Persia still study his texts today.

== Literary works ==
Baqli wrote his spiritual experiences and his poetry in a dense, rhetorical prose style. He composed mostly in Arabic and Persian. His writings are unique because, while they do not include many dates or chronology, he talks about his personal life and his family, while not mentioning other outside events. Baqli was known for his fondness and defense of many early Sufis’ ecstatic sayings (shaṭḥiyyāt) and therefore was dubbed "Doctor Ecstaticus."

Baqli completed his book Commentary on Ecstatic Sayings (Sharḥ al-shaṭḥiyyāt) in 1174. He also wrote The Spirits’ Font in 1184. The Unveiling of Secrets or Kashf al-asrar was completed in 1189 after eight years. It is both an autobiography and a diary of visions and Sufi teachings. Many of his works emphasize the Sufi theories of love, and also defend early Sufi saints in their ecstatic utterances. The Sufi saint Hallaj was a primary example in Baqli's text.

While direct literary references to Baqli in later Sufism were not common, perhaps because of the difficulty of the texts, he was known for his love of beauty: fine fragrances, a beautiful face, and sweet voices. His texts were studied, however, by Jāmi of the fifteenth century and a Mughal prince of the seventeenth century.

== See also ==
- List of Persian poets and authors
- Persian literature

== Sources ==
- Baqli, Ruzbihan. The Unveiling of Secrets: Diary of a Sufi Master. Trans. Carl W. Ernst. Chapel Hill, NC: Parvardigar, 1997.
- Ernst, C. "Rūzbihān." Encyclopaedia of Islam, Second Edition. Edited by: P. Bearman; Th. Bianquis; C.E. Bosworth; E. van Donzel; and W.P. Heinrichs. Brill, 2011. Brill Online. Augustana. 7 April 2011 .
- Ernst, C. Ruzbihan Baqli: Mysticism and the Rhetoric of Sainthood in Persian Sufism. Surrey: Curzon, 1996.
- Ernst, C. "Symbolism of Birds and Flight in the Writings of Ruzbihan Baqli." In The Heritage of Sufism, Volume 2. Ed. Leonard Lewisohn. Oxford: One World, 1999. 353–366.
- Schimmel, Annemarie (1975). Mystical Dimensions of Islam. Chapel Hill, NC: University of North Carolina Press.
- Shahbazi, A. Shapur, "Shiraz", Encyclopædia Iranica, Online Edition, 7 July 2004.
