= Tamhidat =

Persian Persian Sufi work

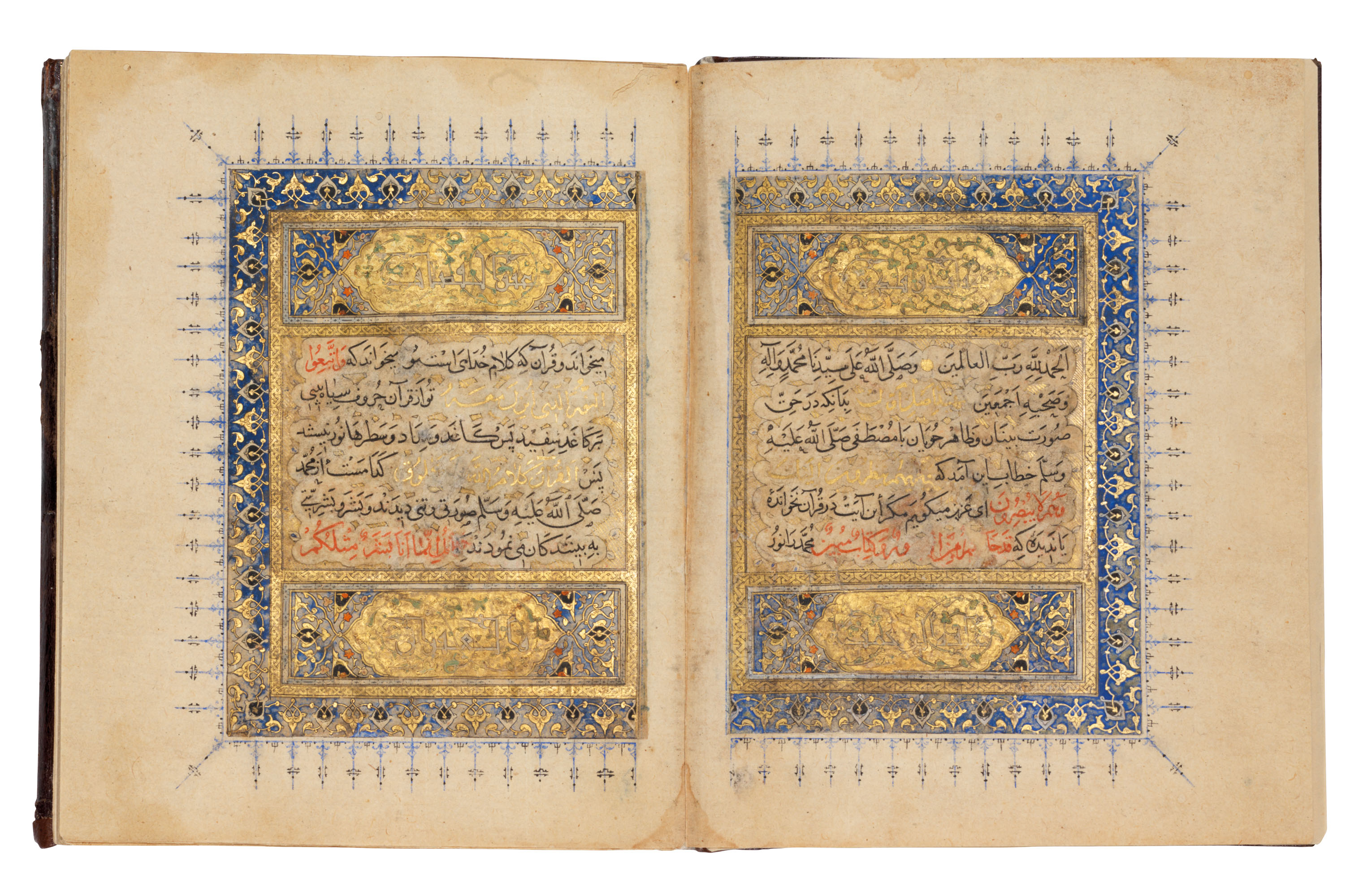
Manuscript of Hamadani's Tamhidat, copy created by Abu'l-Makarim ibn 'Ali al-Murshidi in Iran during the Timurid or Aq Qoyunlu period, dated 1461-62

Tamhidat (تمهیدات) is a Persian Sufi work by Ayn al-Quzat Hamadani (died 525 AH / 1131 CE), one of the important early texts in Islamic mysticism and Persian intellectual history. The book is regarded as a major pre-Avicennan and pre-Ibn Arabi work of mystical thought and has been studied for centuries in Iran, India, and other parts of South Asia.

== Overview ==
Tamhidat presents complex mystical ideas through a comparatively accessible style. Ayn al-Quzat explains abstract Sufi concepts with examples, Persian and Arabic poetry, similes, analogies, Qur'anic quotations, and hadith reports. The work is especially notable for its treatment of the difference between external appearance and inner reality, as well as for its emphasis on spiritual insight as the means of true knowledge. The book is described as consisting of ten sections, or "tamhids". It discusses themes such as acquired knowledge versus divinely bestowed knowledge, the inner reality of the Prophet Muhammad, and the metaphysical significance of divine light in Sufi cosmology.

== Date of composition ==
The exact date of composition is not certain, but it is generally placed after the death of Ahmad Ghazali, Ayn al-Quzat's teacher, who died in 520 AH. Based on internal evidence in the text and calendar calculations, Afif Osseiran dated the work to 521 AH.

== Content ==
In the first tamhid, Ayn al-Quzat distinguishes between acquired knowledge and ladunni knowledge, meaning knowledge granted directly by God. He begins this discussion with reflections on the Qur'an and the Prophet Muhammad, arguing that those who focus only on outward form fail to perceive deeper spiritual truth. A central theme of the book is the concept of the Muhammadan Light (nur Muhammad), which Ayn al-Quzat presents as the original source of creation. He portrays the Prophet not merely as a human being who received revelation, but as a manifestation of divine light. The tenth and longest tamhid, titled "The Origin and Reality of Heaven and Earth Was the Light of Muhammad and Satan Came," develops a metaphysical account of creation and spiritual reality. In this section, Ayn al-Qudat discusses the light of Satan as arising from the divine light of majesty and describes Satan as loving God. He also presents the Prophet's inward reality as an eternal principle distinct from Muhammad's historical life.

Zabihollah Safa attributes the opposition and hostility of the corrupt clergy and the common people toward Ayn al-Quzāt to certain passages in his book Tamhīdāt, which were used as evidence against him. It was according to this that Abu'l-Qasim Darguzini, the vizier of the Seljuks, was moved to scheme to do away with him.

== Style ==
The style of Tamhidat is highly interpretive and densely symbolic. Ayn al-Qudat combines doctrinal exposition with literary devices and scriptural references, making the text both theological and poetic. The repeated use of Qur'anic verses and prophetic traditions reflects its grounding in Islamic sources, while the use of metaphor and analogy makes difficult mystical ideas more intelligible.

== Significance ==
Tamhidat is considered one of the foundational works of Islamic mysticism in Persian literature. It offers important material on Sufi doctrine and preserves references to numerous mystics and mystical teachings that might otherwise be unknown. Its long history of readership across Iran and South Asia reflects its influence within the Sufi tradition.
