= Following Muhammad =

2003 book about Islam by Carl W. Ernst

Following Muhammad: Rethinking Islam in the Contemporary World
- Authors: Carl W. Ernst
- Language: English
- Subject: Islam
- Publisher: University of North Carolina Press
- Publication date: 2003
- Publication place: United Kingdom

Following Muhammad: Rethinking Islam in the Contemporary World is a 2003 book by Carl W. Ernst about the situation of Islam in contemporary world. It has received several international awards, including the 2004 Bashrahil Prize for Outstanding Cultural Achievement.
