= Al-Hallaj =

Arab-speaking Sufi mystic and poet (c. 858–922)

al-Husayn ibn Mansur al-Hallāj
- منصور حلاج
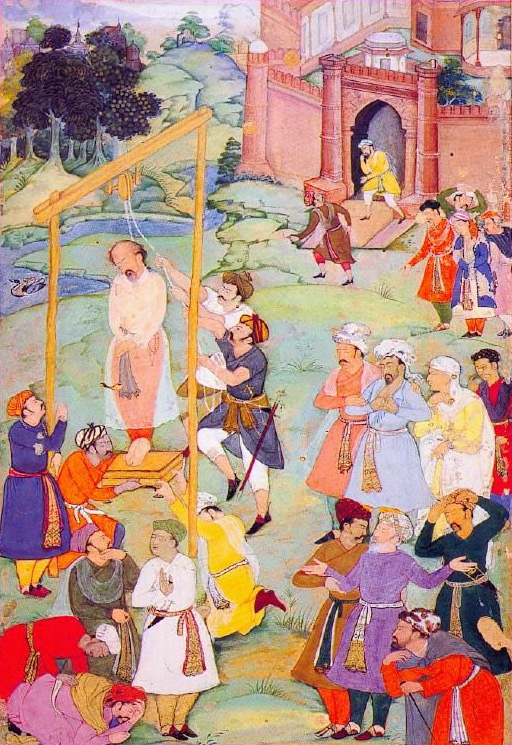
- The execution of Mansur al-Hallaj (manuscript illustration from Mughal Empire, c. 1600)

Personal life
- Born: c. 858 CE Fars, Abbasid Caliphate (present-day Iran)
- Died: March 26, 922 (aged 63–64) CE Baghdad, Abbasid Caliphate (present-day Iraq)
- Era: Abbasid

Religious life
- Religion: Islam
- Denomination: Sunni

Muslim leader
- Influenced by: Dhul-Nun al-Misri, Bayazid Bastami
- Influenced: Ayn al-Quzat Hamadani Hafiz Shirazi, Attar of Nishapur, al-Ghazali, Sanai, Rumi, Balım Sultan, Sachal Sarmast, Imadaddin Nasimi, Shah Hussain, Ahmad Yasawi, Adi ibn Musafir
- Arabic name
- Personal (Ism): الحسين al-Ḥusayn
- Patronymic (Nasab): بن منصور ibn Manṣūr
- Teknonymic (Kunya): ابو المغيث; Abū 'l-Muġīth
- Epithet (Laqab): الحلاج al-Ḥallāj البيضاويُّ Al-Baydaawi

Mansour al-Hallaj (Arabic: ابو المغيث الحسين بن منصور الحلاج, romanized: Abū 'l-Muġīth al-Ḥusayn ibn Manṣūr al-Ḥallāj), also known as Mansour Hallaj (Persian: منصور حلاج, romanized: Mansūr-e Hallāj; c. 858 – 26 March 922; c. 244 AH – 309 AH), was a Muslim Iranian mystic, poet, preacher, and teacher of Sufism, and one of the most controversial figures in Islamic history. During his lifetime he attracted a large popular following and was acclaimed as a saint by many ordinary believers, while Muslim jurists condemned him as a heretic. Most of his contemporary Sufis likewise disapproved of his actions, although he later became a major figure in the Sufi tradition.

Al-Hallaj was associated with the doctrine of fanāʾ, the extinction of individual consciousness, and with ideas described as ḥulūl, or union and identity with God. His mystical teaching sought to overcome the perceived gulf between the human being and God, expressing the relationship between the mystic and the divine in terms of an intimate union of lover and beloved. His most famous utterance, anā al-Ḥaqq ("I am the Truth"), was interpreted by many as a claim to divinity, while others understood it as an expression of the annihilation of the individual ego in which God, rather than the individual self, speaks through the mystic. To contemporary jurists, however, such teaching appeared blasphemously incompatible with the Islamic doctrine of tanzīh, the transcendence of God, and was also perceived as potentially threatening to the social order.

According to tradition, al-Hallaj was also known as Ḥallāj al-asrār, the "Carder of Consciences", because he was believed capable of discerning the secret thoughts of others. He deliberately taught a path of mystical union with God in opposition to what he regarded as the excessively dry and law-bound theology of his age. As a powerful public preacher, he was capable of moving audiences deeply and presented mystical experience as a condition in which the self is overwhelmed by divine presence and can no longer regard itself as autonomous from God.

Al-Hallaj spent many years teaching and travelling extensively through Central Asia and India. He eventually became implicated in political struggles at the Abbasid court, was arrested and subjected to a prolonged period of imprisonment, and was ultimately executed in Baghdad on religious and political charges in 922. His execution was brutal, and later Sufi tradition came to regard him as a pre-eminent mystical martyr. Accounts of his final words portray him as accepting his own fate while asking forgiveness for those responsible for his death and interpreting his execution as the culmination of the mystic's longing for complete solitude with God.

His only surviving work is Kitāb al-Tawāsīn, is dated to 902 CE. It contains the celebrated formula anā al-Ḥaqq, "I am the Truth", whose meaning in the work is presented in the context of divine signs and mystical participation in the Truth rather than simply as an unqualified assertion of personal divinity. His teachings, execution, and subsequent reinterpretation made him one of the most enduring and disputed symbols of ecstatic mysticism in the Sufi tradition.

== Life ==
=== Early years ===
Al-Hallaj was born around 858 in Pars Province of the Abbasid Empire to a cotton-carder (Hallaj means "cotton-carder" in Arabic) in an Arabized town called al-Bayḍā'. His grandfather was a Zoroastrian magus. His father moved to a town in Wasit famous for its school of Quran reciters. Al-Hallaj memorized the Qur'an before he was 12 years old and would often retreat from worldly pursuits to join other mystics in study at the school of Sahl al-Tustari. During this period al-Hallaj lost his ability to speak Persian and later wrote exclusively in Arabic. Al-Hallaj was a Sunni Muslim.

When he was twenty, al-Hallaj moved to Basra, where he married and received his Sufi habit from 'Amr Makkī, although his lifelong and monogamous marriage later provoked opposition from the latter. Through his brother-in-law, al-Hallaj found himself in contact with a Zaydi Shi'i clan that supported the Zanj Rebellion.

Al-Hallaj later went to Baghdad to consult the famous Sufi teacher Junayd of Baghdad, but he was tired of the conflict that existed between his father-in-law and 'Amr Makkī and set out on a pilgrimage to Mecca, against the advice of Junayd, as soon as the Zanj Rebellion was crushed.

=== Pilgrimages and travels ===
In Mecca, he made a vow to remain for one year in the courtyard of the sanctuary in fasting and total silence. When he returned from Mecca, he laid down the Sufi tunic and adopted a "lay habit" in order to be able to preach more freely. At that time a number of Sunnis, including former Christians who would later become viziers at the Abbasid court, became his disciples, but other Sufis were scandalized, while some Muʿtazilis and Shias who held high posts in the government accused him of deception and incited the mob against him. Al-Hallaj left for eastern Iran and remained there for five years, preaching in the Arab colonies and fortified monasteries that housed volunteer fighters in the jihad, after which he was able to return and install his family in Baghdad.

Al-Hallaj made his second pilgrimage to Mecca with four hundred disciples, where some Sufis, his former friends, accused him of sorcery and making a pact with the jinn. Afterwards he set out on a long voyage that took him to India and Turkestan beyond the frontiers of Islamic lands. About 290/902 he returned to Mecca for his final pilgrimage clad in an Indian loin-cloth and a patched garment over his shoulders. There he prayed to God to be made despised and rejected, so that God alone might grant grace to Himself through His servant's lips.

=== Imprisonment and execution ===
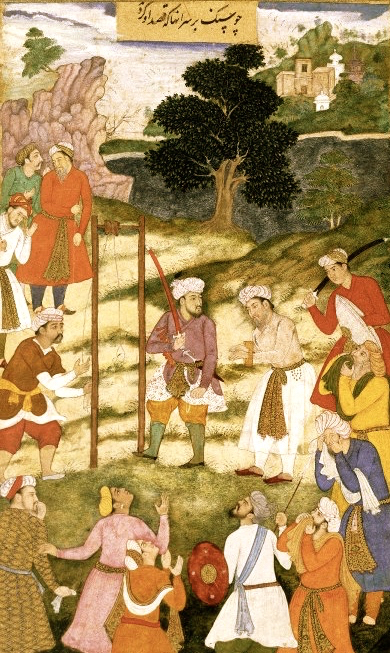
The Execution of Mansur Hallaj. Watercolor from Mughal India circa 1600.

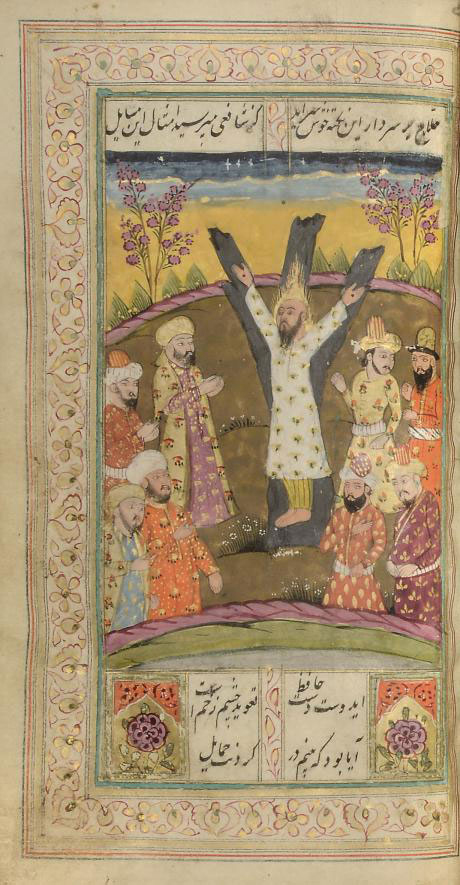
Burning and crucifixion of Mansur al-Hallaj, depiction from a 19th-century Kashmiri manuscript.

After returning to his family in Baghdad, al-Hallaj began making proclamations that aroused popular emotion and caused anxiety among the educated classes. These included avowing his burning love of God and his desire to "die accursed for the Community", and statements such as "O Muslims, save me from God" ... "God has made my blood lawful to you: kill me". It was at that time that al-Hallaj is said to have pronounced his famous shath "I am the Truth". He was denounced at the court, but a Shafi'i jurist refused to condemn him, stating that spiritual inspiration was beyond his jurisdiction.

Al-Hallaj's preaching had by now inspired a movement for moral and political reform in Baghdad. In 296/908 Sunni reformers made an unsuccessful attempt to depose the underage caliph al-Muqtadir. When he was restored, his Shi'i vizier Hamid ibn al-Abbas unleashed anti-Hanbali repressions which prompted al-Hallaj to flee Baghdad, but three years later he was arrested, brought back, and put in prison, where he remained for nine years.

The conditions of al-Hallaj's confinement varied depending on the relative sway his opponents and supporters held at the court, but he was finally condemned to death in 922 on the charge of being a Qarmatian rebel who wished to destroy the Kaaba, because he had said "the important thing is to proceed seven times around the Kaaba of one's heart." According to another report, the pretext was his recommendation to build local replicas of the Kaaba for those who are unable to make the pilgrimage to Mecca. The queen-mother interceded with the caliph who initially revoked the execution order, but the intrigues of the vizier finally moved him to approve it. On 23 Dhu 'l-Qa'da (March 25) trumpets announced his execution the next day. The words he spoke during the last night in his cell are collected in Akhbar al-Hallaj.Thousands of people witnessed his execution on the banks of the Tigris River. He was first punched in the face by his executioner, then lashed until unconscious, and then decapitated or hanged. Witnesses reported that al-Hallaj's last words under torture were "all that matters for the ecstatic is that the Unique should reduce him to Unity", after which he recited the Quranic verse 42:18. His body was doused in oil and set alight, and his ashes were then scattered into the river. A cenotaph was "quickly" built on the site of his execution, and "drew pilgrims for a millennium" until being swept away by a Tigris flood during the 1920s.

Some question whether al-Hallaj was executed for religious reasons as has been commonly assumed. According to Carl W. Ernst, the legal notion of blasphemy was not clearly defined in Islamic law and statements of this kind were treated inconsistently by legal authorities. In practice, since apostasy was subsumed under the category of zandaqa, viewing heresy as a political crime, they were prosecuted only when it was politically convenient. Sadakat Kadri points out that "it was far from conventional to punish heresy in the tenth century," and it is thought he would have been spared execution except that the vizier of caliph al-Muqtadir wished to discredit "certain figures who had associated themselves" with al-Hallaj. (Previously al-Hallaj had been punished for talking about being at one with God by being shaved, pilloried and beaten with the flat of a sword, not executed because the Shafi'ite judge had ruled that his words were not "proof of disbelief.")

== Teachings and practices ==
Al-Hallaj addressed himself to popular audiences encouraging them to find God inside their own souls, which earned him the title of "the carder of innermost souls" (ḥallāj al-asrār). He preached without the traditional Sufi habit and used language familiar to the local Shi'i population. This may have given the impression that he was a Qarmatian missionary rather than a Sufi. His prayer to God to make him lost and despised can be regarded as typical for a Sufi seeking annihilation in God, although Louis Massignon has interpreted it as an expression of a desire to sacrifice himself as atonement on behalf of all Muslims. When al-Hallaj returned to Baghdad from his last pilgrimage to Mecca, he built a model of the Kaaba in his home for private worship.

Al-Hallaj was popularly credited with numerous supernatural acts. He was said to have "lit four hundred oil lamps in Jerusalem's Church of the Holy Sepulchre with his finger and extinguished an eternal flame in a Zoroastrian fire temple with the tug of a sleeve."

Among other Sufis, al-Hallaj was an anomaly. Many Sufi masters felt that it was inappropriate to share mysticism with the masses, yet al-Hallaj openly did so in his writings and through his teachings. This was exacerbated by occasions when he would fall into trances which he attributed to being in the presence of God.

Hallaj was also accused of ḥulūl "incarnationism", the basis of which charge seems to be a disputed verse in which the author proclaims mystical union in terms of two spirits in one body. This position was criticized for not affirming union and unity strongly enough; there are two spirits left whereas the Sufi fana' texts speak of utter annihilation and annihilation in annihilation (the annihilation of the consciousness of annihilation), with only one actor, the deity, left. Saer El-Jaichi has argued "that in speaking of the unity with the divine in terms of ḥulūl, Hallaj does not mean the fusion (or, mingling) of the divine and human substances." Rather, he has in mind "a heightened sense of awareness that culminates in the fulfillment of a spiritual – super-sensory – vision of God’s presence."

Edward Said succinctly described al-Hallaj as "quasi-Christlike."

There are conflicting reports about his most famous shaṭḥ, أنا الحق Anā l-Ḥaqq "I am The Truth, " which was taken to mean that he was claiming to be God, since al-Ḥaqq "the Truth" is one of the names of God in Islam. While meditating, he uttered انا الحق The earliest report, coming from a hostile account of Basra grammarians, states that he said it in the mosque of al-Mansur, while testimonies that emerged decades later claimed that it was said in private during consultations with Junayd Baghdadi. Even though this utterance has become inseparably associated with his execution in the popular imagination, owing in part to its inclusion in his biography by Attar of Nishapur, the historical issues surrounding his execution are far more complex.In another controversial statement, al-Hallaj claimed "There is nothing wrapped in my turban but God, " and similarly he would point to his cloak and say, ما في جبتي إلا الله Mā fī jubbatī illā l-Lāh "There is nothing in my cloak but God." He also wrote:

I saw my Lord with the eye of the heart
I asked, "Who are You?"
He replied, "You".

In the 11th volume of the proto-Salafi Ibn Kathir's book al-Bidaya wa-l-Nihaya, it is said that al-Hallaj used to deceive people by putting on plays with his hired men under the guise of spiritual healing, and extorting money from them by cunning and secret, and it is also stated that, he came to India to learn and practice Indian magic. Ibn Kathir also said in the book, "Abu Abd al-Rahman al-Sulami Amr ibn Uthman said on the authority of al-Makki: He said: "I was walking with al-Hallaj in some streets of Makkah and I read the Qur'an. I was reciting, and he heard my recitation. And said: I can recite the same (recitation), so I left him". Narrated by Ibn Kathir, Abu Zari al-Tabari said, I heard Abu Ya'qub al-Aqta say: I gave my daughter in marriage to al-Husayn al-Hallaj when I saw his good conduct and diligence, and after a short time it became clear to me that He is a deceitful sorcerer, a hateful infidel. Ibn Kathir also said, "Muhammad ibn Yahya al-Razi said: I heard Amr ibn Uthman cursing him and saying: If I could have killed him, I would have killed him with my own hands. I said to him: What did the Shaykh get on him? He Said: "I read a verse of the Book of Allah and He said: I can compose like it and speak like it." Ibn Kathir also said, and Abu al-Qasim al-Qushayri mentioned in his letter in the chapter on preserving the hearts of the sheikhs: Amr bin Uthman entered the house of al-Hallaj when he was in Makkah, he (Hallaj) was writing something on paper and he (Amr) said to him : What is it? He (Hallaj) said: It is against the Qur'an. He said: Then he prayed for Hallaj to fail in this pursuit, so he was not successful. Amr objected to how would Abu Ya'qub al-Aqta marry him to his daughter.

== Works ==
Al-Hallaj's principal works, all written in Arabic, included:

- Twenty-seven Riwāyāt (stories or narratives) collected by his disciples in about 290/902.
- Kitāb al-Tawāsīn, a series of eleven short works.
- Poems collected in Dīwān al-Hallāj.
- Pronouncements including those of his last night collected in Akhbār al-Hallāj.

His best known written work is the Book of al-Tawasin (كتاب الطواسين), in which he used line diagrams and symbols to help him convey mystical experiences that he could not express in words. Ṭawāsīn is the broken plural of the word ṭā-sīn which spells out the letters ṭā (ط) and sīn (س) placed for unknown reasons at the start of some surahs in the Quran. The chapters vary in length and subject. Chapter 1 is an homage to Muhammad, for example, while Chapters 4 and 5 are treatments of his legendary ascent to Mi'raj. Chapter 6 is the longest of the chapters and is devoted to a dialogue of Satan (Iblis) and God, where Satan refuses to bow to Adam, although God asks him to do so. Satan's monotheistic claim—that he refused to bow before any other than God even at the risk of eternal rejection and torment—is combined with the lyrical language of the love-mad lover from the Majnun tradition, the lover whose loyalty is so total that there is no path for him to any "other than" the beloved. This passage explores the issues of mystical knowledge (ma'rifa) when it contradicts God's commands for although Iblis was disobeying God's commands, he was following God's will. His refusal is due, others argue, to a misconceived idea of God's uniqueness and because of his refusal to abandon himself to God in love. Hallaj criticizes the staleness of his adoration (Mason, 51–3). Al-Hallaj stated in this book:

If you do not recognize God, at least recognize His sign, I am the creative truth
because through the truth, I am eternal truth.

— Al-Hallaj, Kitāb al-Tawāsīn

== Classical era views ==
Few figures in Islam provoked as much debate among classical commentators as al-Hallaj. The controversy cut across doctrinal categories. In virtually every major current of juridical and theological thought (Hanafi, Maliki, Shafi'i Hanbali, Maturidi, Ash'ari, and also Jafari) one finds his detractors and others who accepted his legacy completely or justified his statements. His admirers among philosophers included Ibn Tufayl, Suhrawardi, and Mulla Sadra.

Although the majority of early Sufi teachers condemned him, he was almost unanimously canonized by later generations of Sufis. The principal Sufi interpretation of the shathiyat which took the form of "I am" sayings contrasted the permanence (baqā) of God with the mystical annihilation (fanā) of the individual ego, which made it possible for God to speak through the individual. Some Sufi authors claimed that such utterances were misquotations or attributed them to immaturity, madness or intoxication, while others regarded them as authentic expressions of spiritual states, even profoundest experience of divine realities, which should not be manifested to the unworthy. Some of them, including al-Ghazali, showed ambivalence about their apparently blasphemous nature while admiring the spiritual status of their authors. Rumi wrote: "When the pen (of authority) is in the hand of a traitor, unquestionably Mansur is on a gibbet"

== Modern views ==
The supporters of Mansur have interpreted his statement as meaning, "God has emptied me of everything but Himself. " According to them, Mansur never denied God's oneness and was a strict monotheist. However, he believed that the actions of man, when performed in total accordance with God's pleasure, lead to a blissful unification with Him. Malayalam author Vaikom Muhammad Basheer draws parallel between "Anā al-Ḥaqq" and Aham Brahmasmi, the Upanishad Mahāvākya which means 'I am Brahman' (the Ultimate Reality in Hinduism). Basheer uses this term to intend God is found within one's 'self'. There was a belief among European historians that al-Hallaj was secretly a Christian, until the French scholar Louis Massignon presented his legacy in the context of Islamic mysticism in his four-volume work La Passion de Husayn ibn Mansûr Hallâj.

== Influence ==
Mansur al-Hallaj was also seen as a model of a Sufi apostle who, before he was captured and sentenced to death for heresy, travelled to Kurdish territories, where he preached his teachings and gained considerable popularity among local tribes. Hallaj highly influenced Sheikh Adi ibn Musafir. Hallaj is revered in Yazidism, which has hymns devoted to him. Elements of his views expressed in Kitab al-Tawasin can be found in their religion.

== See also ==
- Arabic literature
- List of Persian poets and authors
- Sufism
- Hasan of Basra
- Rabi'a al-'Adawiyya
- Aham Brahmasmi
- Anal Haq
