= M. A. R. Habib =

- Occupation: Professor

Academic work
- Discipline: English, Philosophy, Religion
- Institutions: Rutgers University
- Notable works: Hegel and the Foundations of Literary Theory

M. A. Rafey Habib, commonly published as M. A. R. Habib, is an academic, literary critic, poet, and translator whose scholarship focuses on the history of literary criticism, literary theory, philosophy, and comparative literature. He is a Distinguished Professor at Rutgers University–Camden, where he has taught English literature and works in the Department of Philosophy and Religion.

Habib has written books on the historical development of literary criticism, the philosophical influences on T. S. Eliot, and the relationship between the philosophy of Georg Wilhelm Friedrich Hegel and literary theory.

He edited volume six of The Cambridge History of Literary Criticism (2013) and revised the fifth edition of J. A. Cuddon's The Penguin Dictionary of Literary Terms and Literary Theory.

His translation work includes English translations of modern Urdu poetry and, in collaboration with the scholar of Islam Bruce B. Lawrence, The Qur'an: A Verse Translation (2024).

== Education and career ==
Habib studied at the University of Essex in England and earned his doctorate in English literature from the University of Oxford.

He has been a faculty member at Rutgers University–Camden since 1992. Habib is listed as a Distinguished Professor of Philosophy and Religion.

== Scholarship ==
=== History of literary criticism and theory ===
Habib's scholarship includes historical surveys of Western literary criticism and its relationship to philosophy, politics, and intellectual history. His book A History of Literary Criticism: From Plato to the Present (2005), published by Blackwell, examines the development of literary criticism from classical antiquity through the twentieth century. The book was reviewed by Jeremy Tambling in The Modern Language Review (2007) and was named a 2006 Outstanding Academic Title by Choice.

Habib published Modern Literary Criticism and Theory: A History (2008), which concentrates on modern literary theory and criticism, including twentieth-century intellectual movements.

In Literary Criticism from Plato to the Present: An Introduction (2011), Habib produced a shorter survey of the historical development of literary criticism intended for introductory study.

A revised second edition, titled Literary Criticism from Plato to Post-Theory: An Introduction, appeared in 2025. The revised work extends the earlier historical survey to include developments in twenty-first-century criticism, including affect theory, cognitive literary studies, world literature, posthumanism, and digital humanities.

He also wrote Literary Studies: A Norton Guide (2020), an introductory textbook addressing literary analysis, genres, literary history, critical theory, academic writing, and research methods.

=== The Cambridge History of Literary Criticism ===
Habib edited the sixth volume of The Cambridge History of Literary Criticism, titled The Nineteenth Century, c. 1830–1914, published by Cambridge University Press in 2013. The volume examines the development of literary criticism as a scholarly discipline during the nineteenth century. Its contributions address national traditions, literary movements, developments in aesthetic philosophy, and the relationships between literary criticism and other fields of knowledge.

Habib contributed the chapter "Hegel's aesthetics and their influence", which discusses Hegel's philosophy of art and its relationship to nineteenth-century literary and philosophical thought.

The volume was reviewed by the literary historian Stefan Collini in Modern Philology in 2014.

=== Literary terminology and reference works ===
Habib revised the fifth edition of J. A. Cuddon's A Dictionary of Literary Terms and Literary Theory, published in 2012. The work was also published under the title The Penguin Dictionary of Literary Terms and Literary Theory.

The edition was reviewed by Dorota Filipczak in Text Matters in 2013 and by Kathleen A. Langan in Reference Reviews in 2014.

=== T. S. Eliot and Western philosophy ===
In The Early T. S. Eliot and Western Philosophy (1999), Habib examines the relationship between Eliot's early literary work and the philosophical traditions he encountered during his education. The study considers the role of philosophy in Eliot's poetry and criticism, including the relationship between his literary development and contemporary philosophical debates.

The book received reviews in several academic journals, including The Review of English Studies, Tijdschrift voor Filosofie, and Philosophy in review.

=== Hegel, literary theory and postcolonial studies ===
Habib's later scholarship has examined the philosophy of Georg Wilhelm Friedrich Hegel, particularly its relationship to literary theory, colonialism, and global intellectual history.

In Hegel and Empire: From Postcolonialism to Globalism (2017), Habib studies Hegel's treatment of non-European cultures, including Africa, India, and Islam. The book considers the tensions between Hegel's Eurocentric historical framework and the uses of Hegelian dialectics in postcolonial thought.

Reviewing the book in The Philosophical Quarterly, Garry Bertholf discussed Habib's interpretation of Hegelian dialectics in relation to global capitalism, imperialism, and postcolonial criticism. The book was also reviewed by Wendy Shaw in New Global Studies.

Habib continued this investigation in Hegel and the Foundations of Literary Theory (2018), published by Cambridge University Press. The book examines connections between Hegelian philosophy and the development of modern literary and critical theory.

The book was reviewed by Oliver Harris in Hegel Bulletin. Harris's review appeared online in 2020 and in the journal's December 2021 issue.

== Translations ==
=== Urdu Poetry ===
Habib has translated and edited works of modern Urdu literature into English.

His early translation work includes The Dissident Voice: Poems of N. M. Rashed (1993), a collection of poems by the Urdu modernist poet N. M. Rashed. The volume presents English translations of Rashed's poetry with critical commentary. The collection was reviewed by John Oliver Perry in World Literature Today in 1993.

In 2003, Habib edited and translated An Anthology of Modern Urdu Poetry: In English Translation, with Urdu Text, published by the Modern Language Association of America as part of its Texts and Translations series. The anthology presents modern Urdu poetry with English translations and the original Urdu texts. The anthology was reviewed by Anushiya Ramaswamy in Papers on Language and Literature in 2009.

In 2024, Habib and the Islamic studies scholar Bruce B. Lawrence published The Qur'an: A Verse Translation through Liveright, an imprint of W. W. Norton & Company. The translation presents the Quran in English verse and was developed through a collaboration between the two scholars.

His collection Shades of Islam: Poems for a New Century appeared in 2010 through Kube Publishing. The poems address religious identity, violence, and the representation of Islam in contemporary public discourse.

=== Translation of the Qur'an ===
In 2024, Habib and the Islamic studies scholar Bruce B. Lawrence published The Qur'an: A Verse Translation through Liveright, an imprint of W. W. Norton & Company. The translation presents the Quran in English verse and was developed through a collaboration between the two scholars.

The translators sought to convey aspects of the rhythmic and poetic qualities of the Arabic text while maintaining an accessible English rendering. The volume includes supplementary material intended to provide historical and interpretive context.

The translation received critical attention following its publication. Mike Maggio reviewed it in the Washington Independent Review of Books in February 2024, discussing the challenges involved in translating the Qur'an's linguistic and cultural meanings. Other reviews appeared in Open Letters Review and The Muslim World Book Review, where the translation was examined in relation to existing English renderings of the Qur'an.

=== Poetry ===
His collection Shades of Islam: Poems for a New Century appeared in 2010 through Kube Publishing. The poems address religious identity, violence, and the representation of Islam in contemporary public discourse.

In October 2010, Rutgers University reported that Habib had written poems responding to violent extremism and the use of religious rhetoric to justify acts of violence. The university also organized a public reading from the collection as part of its Cappuccino Academy lecture series.

== Selected publications ==
=== Literary criticism and philosophy ===
- Habib, M. A. R. (1999). The Early T. S. Eliot and Western Philosophy. Cambridge University Press. ISBN 9780521063531.
- Habib, M. A. R. (2005). A History of Literary Criticism: From Plato to the Present. Blackwell Publishing. ISBN 9780631232001.
- Habib, M. A. R. (2008). Modern Literary Criticism and Theory: A History. Blackwell Publishing. ISBN 9781405176668.
- Habib, M. A. R. (2011). Literary Criticism from Plato to the Present: An Introduction. Wiley-Blackwell. ISBN 9781405160353.
- Habib, M. A. R., ed. (2013). The Cambridge History of Literary Criticism. Vol. 6: The Nineteenth Century, c. 1830–1914. Cambridge University Press. ISBN 9781316606100.
- Habib, M. A. R. (2017). Hegel and Empire: From Postcolonialism to Globalism. Palgrave Macmillan. ISBN 9783319684116.
- Habib, M. A. R. (2018). Hegel and the Foundations of Literary Theory. Cambridge University Press. ISBN 9781108471381.
- Habib, M. A. R. (2020). Literary Studies: A Norton Guide. W. W. Norton & Company. ISBN 9780393937954.
- Habib, M. A. R. (2025). Literary Criticism from Plato to Post-Theory: An Introduction. 2nd ed. Wiley-Blackwell. ISBN 9781394188871.

=== Edited and translated works ===
- Rashed, N. M. (1993). The Dissident Voice: Poems of N. M. Rashed. Translated and edited by M. A. R. Habib. Oxford University Press.
- Habib, M. A. R., trans. and ed. (2003). An Anthology of Modern Urdu Poetry: In English Translation, with Urdu Text. Modern Language Association. ISBN 9780873527972.
- Cuddon, J. A. (2012). A Dictionary of Literary Terms and Literary Theory. 5th ed., revised by M. A. R. Habib. Wiley-Blackwell.
- Cuddon, J. A., and M. A. R. Habib (2014). The Penguin Dictionary of Literary Terms and Literary Theory. Penguin Books. ISBN 9780141047157.
- Habib, M. A. R., and Bruce B. Lawrence, trans. (2024). The Qur'an: A Verse Translation. Liveright. ISBN 9780871404992.

=== Poetry ===
- Habib, M. A. R. (2010). Shades of Islam: Poems for a New Century. Kube Publishing
