= Abr =

Village in Semnan province, Iran

Abr Persian: ابر
- Village
- Location within Iran
- Coordinates: 36°42′28″N 55°05′05″E
- Country: Iran
- Province: Semnan
- County: Shahrud
- District: Bastam
- Rural District: Kharqan

Population (2016)
  - Total: 1,480
- Time zone: UTC+3:30 (IRST)

Abr (Persian: ابر) (Note: Also known as Abz) is a village in Kharqan Rural District (Note: Formerly Bastam Rural District) of Bastam District in Shahrud County, Semnan province, Iran.

== Demographics ==
=== Population ===
At the time of the 2006 National Census, the village's population was 1,383 in 355 households. The following census in 2011 counted 1,260 people in 402 households. The 2016 census measured the population of the village as 1,480 people in 504 households.
