= Qaleh Now-e Kharaqan =

Village in Semnan province, Iran

Qaleh Now-e Kharaqan Persian: قلعه نو خرقان
- Village
- Location within Iran
- Coordinates: 36°37′57″N 55°04′20″E
- Country: Iran
- Province: Semnan
- County: Shahrud
- District: Bastam
- Rural District: Kharqan

Population (2016)
  - Total: 3,166
- Time zone: UTC+3:30 (IRST)

Qaleh Now-e Kharaqan (Persian: قلعه نوخرقان) (Note: Also romanized as Qal‘eh Now-e Kharaqān, Qal‘eh-ye Now Khareqān, Qal‘eh-ye Now-e Kharaqān, and Qal‘eh-ye Now-e Khareqān; also known as Ghal’eh Now Kharaghan, Qal‘eh Nau, Qal‘eh Now-e Kharagān, and Qal‘eh-ye Now) is a village in, and the capital of, Kharqan Rural District (Note: Formerly Bastam Rural District) in Bastam District of Shahrud County, Semnan province, Iran.

== Demographics ==
=== Population ===
At the time of the 2006 National Census, the village's population was 1,937 in 582 households. The following census in 2011 counted 3,927 people in 1,248 households. The 2016 census measured the population of the village as 3,166 people in 1,089 households.
