= Abu Sa'id Abu'l-Khayr =

Persian poet and Sufi mystic (967–1049)

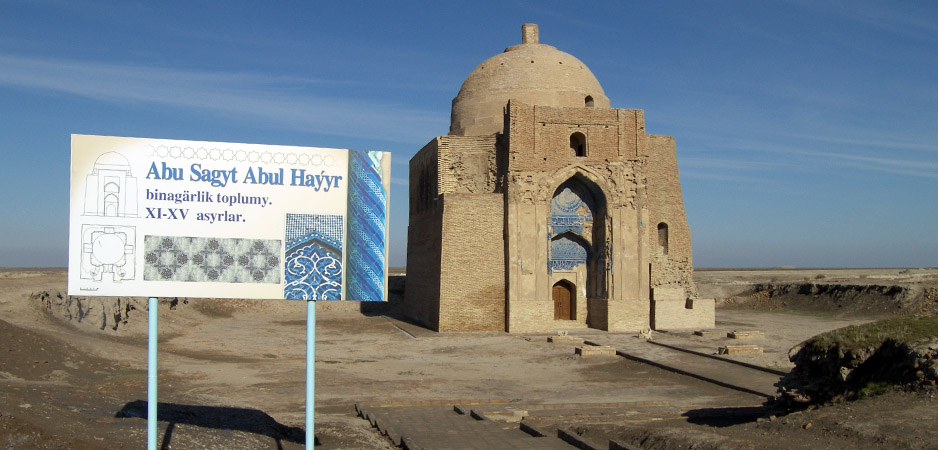
Mausoleum of Abū-Sa'īd Abul-Khayr

Abū Saʿīd Abū'l-Khayr or Abusa'id Abolkhayr (Persian: ابوسعید ابوالخیر) (December 7, 967 - January 12, 1049), also known as Sheikh Abusaeid or Abu Sa'eed, was a famous Persian Sufi and poet who contributed extensively to the evolution of Sufi tradition.

The majority of what is known from his life comes from the book Asrar al-Tawhid (اسرارالتوحید, or "The Mysteries of Unification") written by Mohammad Ibn Monavvar, one of his grandsons, 130 years after his death.

The book, which is an important early Sufi writing in Persian, presents a record of his life in the form of anecdotes from a variety of sources and contains a collection of his words.

During his life his fame spread throughout the Islamic world, even to Spain. He was the first Sufi writer to widely use ordinary love poems as way to express and illuminate mysticism, and as such he played a major role in foundation of Persian Sufi poetry. He spent most of his life in Nishapur.

== Biography ==
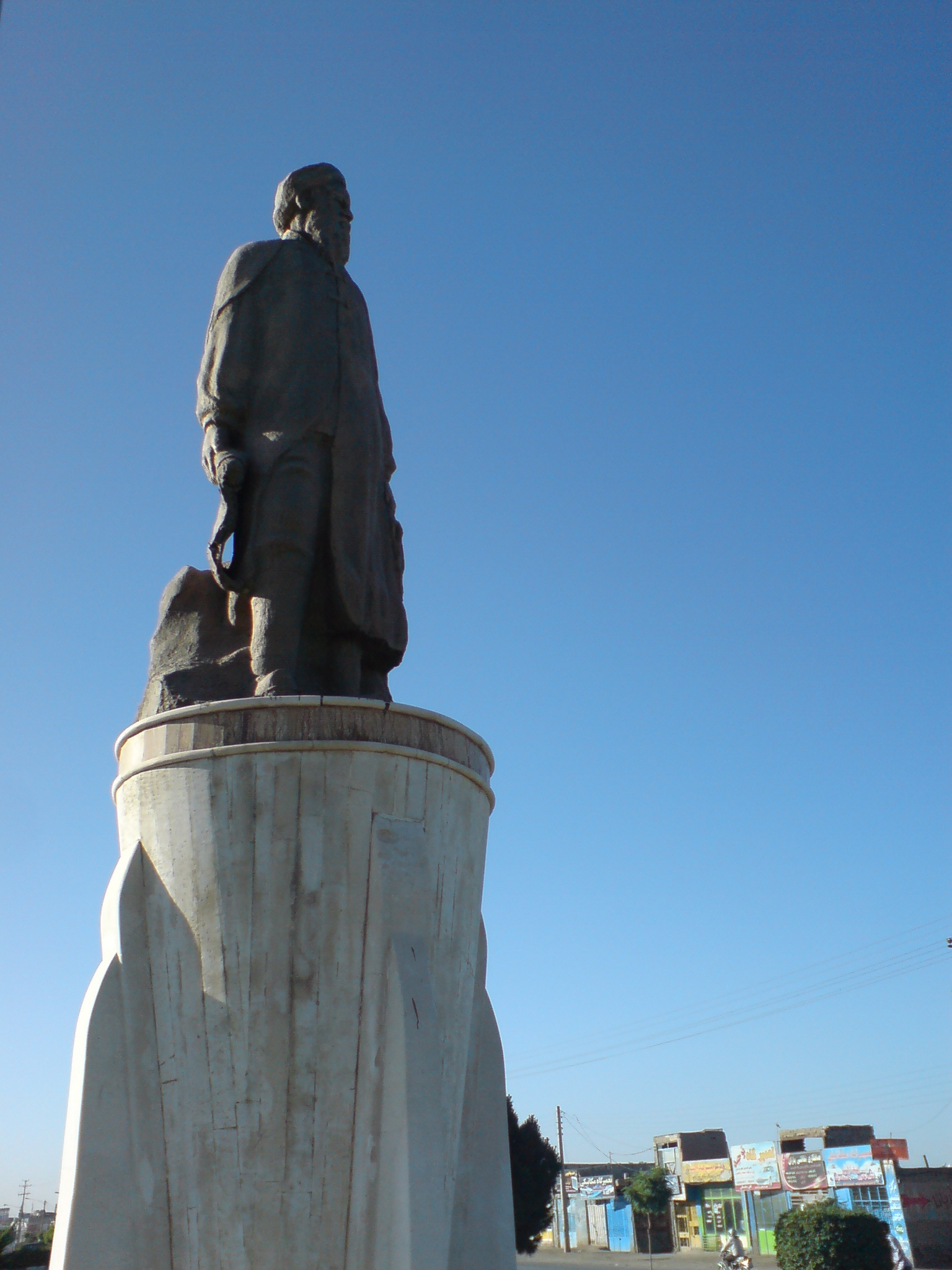
Statue of Abū-Sa'īd Abul-Khayr in Nishapur.

Abū-Sa'īd was born in Khorasan, in the village of Miana, in what is today Akhal Province, Turkmenistan. His father was a herbalist and physician with an interest in Sufism.

He then moved and lived in the city of Nishapur, and subsequently moved back to Miana after a few years. Abū-Sa'īd's formal education included Islamic scholarship and Arabic literature that he continued until the age 23 when he left them for Sufism.

He also traveled to and spent time in small towns around the same province visiting other Sufis or his teachers. He studied jurisprudence and hadith for many years in Marv and Sarakhs until, in an important event in his life, he abandoned his studies and joined the circle of Sufis and turned to the valley of mysticism. After receiving the method of Sufism from Sheikh Abolfazl Sarakhsi and Abul-Abbas Qassab Amoli, Sheikh Abu Said returned to his original country and practiced austerity for seven years and went to Nishabur at the age of 40.

=== Preaching of Islam in Nishapur ===
Shaikh Abu Sai'd Abu al-Khayr's biography contains several references to the non-Muslim communities of Nishapur during his era. His spiritual powers were demonstrated on various occasions through the conversion of large numbers of Jews, Christians, and Zoroastrians to Islam. One particularly detailed account describes the conversion of forty Christians from Nishapur. The Shaikh stood outside the Christian church. He called upon the pictures of Christ and Mary which were hung from a platform erected in front of the church to fall down if they acknowledged Muhammad and his religion as true. As a result of this challenge, the pictures fell face down, oriented toward the Ka'ba. This miracle led several Christians to convert to Islam.

== Mysticism ==
His mysticism is a typical example of the Khorasani school of Sufism. He extracted the essence of the teachings of the past Sufis of this school (and to some extent other schools as well) and expressed them in a simpler, and in a sense deeper, form without the use of philosophy.

He held a special reverence for earlier Sufis, especially Bayazid Bastami and Hallaj. Moreover, in Asrar al-Tawhid, Tazkiratul Awliyā and Noorul Uloom it has been written that Abū-Sa'īd went for the visit of Shaikh Abul Hassan Kharaqani and got deeply influenced by his personality and state.

His system is based on a few themes that appear frequently in his words, generally in the form of simple emotional poems.

The main focus of his teachings is liberation from “I”, which he considered the one and only cause of separation from God and to which he attributed all personal and social misfortunes. His biography mentions that he would never call himself "I" or "we" but “they” instead. This idea of selflessness appears as Fotovvat (a concept very near to chivalry) in his ethical teachings and as Malaamat, a kind of selflessness before the Beloved which he considers a sign of perfect love in his strictly mystical teachings.

Both of these concepts in a certain sense are spiritual forms of warrior ethics. Despite their simplicity he believed that the full application of these teachings to one's life requires both divine grace and the guidance of an experienced Sufi, and is impossible through personal efforts alone. His picture as portrayed in various Sufi writings is a particularly joyful one of continuous ecstasy. Other famous Sufis made frequent references to him, a notable example being the Persian Sufi poet Farid al-Din Attar, who mentions Abū-Sa'īd as his spiritual guide. Many miracles are attributed to him in Sufi writings.

== Poetry ==
Many short Persian poems are attributed to him and he is considered one of the great medieval Persian poets. The attribution of these poems has always been doubtful and due to recent research, it is generally believed that he wrote only two poems in his life. The attribution of so many poems to Abū-Sa'īd was due to his great fondness for poetry. His love for poetry can be seen from the fact that he usually used love poetry written by non-Sufis in his daily prayers. Even his last words were a poem, and at his funeral instead of the recitation of Qur’anic verses, he requested the following poem.

What sweeter than this in the world!
Friend met friend and the lover joined his Beloved.

That was all sorrow, this is all joy
Those were all words, this is all reality.

Another example of the poems attributed to him.

Love came and flew as blood in my veins
Emptied me of myself and filled me with beloved.

Each part of my being she conquered
Now a mere name is left to me and the rest is she.

== Views on Islam ==
Abū-Sa'īd insists that his teachings and Sufism as a whole are the true meaning of Islam. He based his teachings on the mystic interpretation of verses from Sufism and some hadiths and was considered a learned Sufism scholar. Nevertheless, his interpretations of Sufism were considered an ocean of knowledge in exegesis of the Sufism.

To this day this has been one of the causes of criticizing him from a religious point of view. In general he was bold in expressing his mystic opinions as can be seen from his praise of Hallaj who was considered a heretic by most of the Pseudo-Sufis and most ignoramus laymen of the time due to irrelevant conclusions without a depth of support of the great majority of the Islamic scholars of the time and present modern era, although the common opinion about Hallaj changed in time.

== Relationship with Avicenna ==
There is evidence that Abū-Sa'īd and Avicenna, the Persian physician and philosopher, corresponded with one another. Abū-Sa'īd records several meetings between them in his biography. The first meeting is described as three days of private conversation, at the end of which Abū-Sa'īd said to his followers that everything that he could see (i.e. in visions), Avicenna knew, and in turn Avicenna said that everything he knew Abū-Sa'īd could see, in realistic theory presents the superlative connection between Islamic Saints of God (أولياء, Awliya) revealing the reliability of such spiritual powers as believed to be placed on them by Allah ( الله, God).

== Bibliography ==
- Ordoubadian, Reza (2010). The Poems of Abu Said Abil-Kheyr. Ibex Publishers.
- Bosworth, Clifford Edmund (1963). The Ghaznavids: Their Empire in Afghanistan and Eastern Iran, 994 : 1040. University Press.

== See also ==
- List of Persian poets and authors
- Mir Sayyid Ali Hamadani
- Persian literature
- Sufi poetry
- Sufism outside of Iran Khairiyyah
