= Ayn al-Quzat Hamadani =

Persian jurist, mystic, philosopher, poet and mathematician

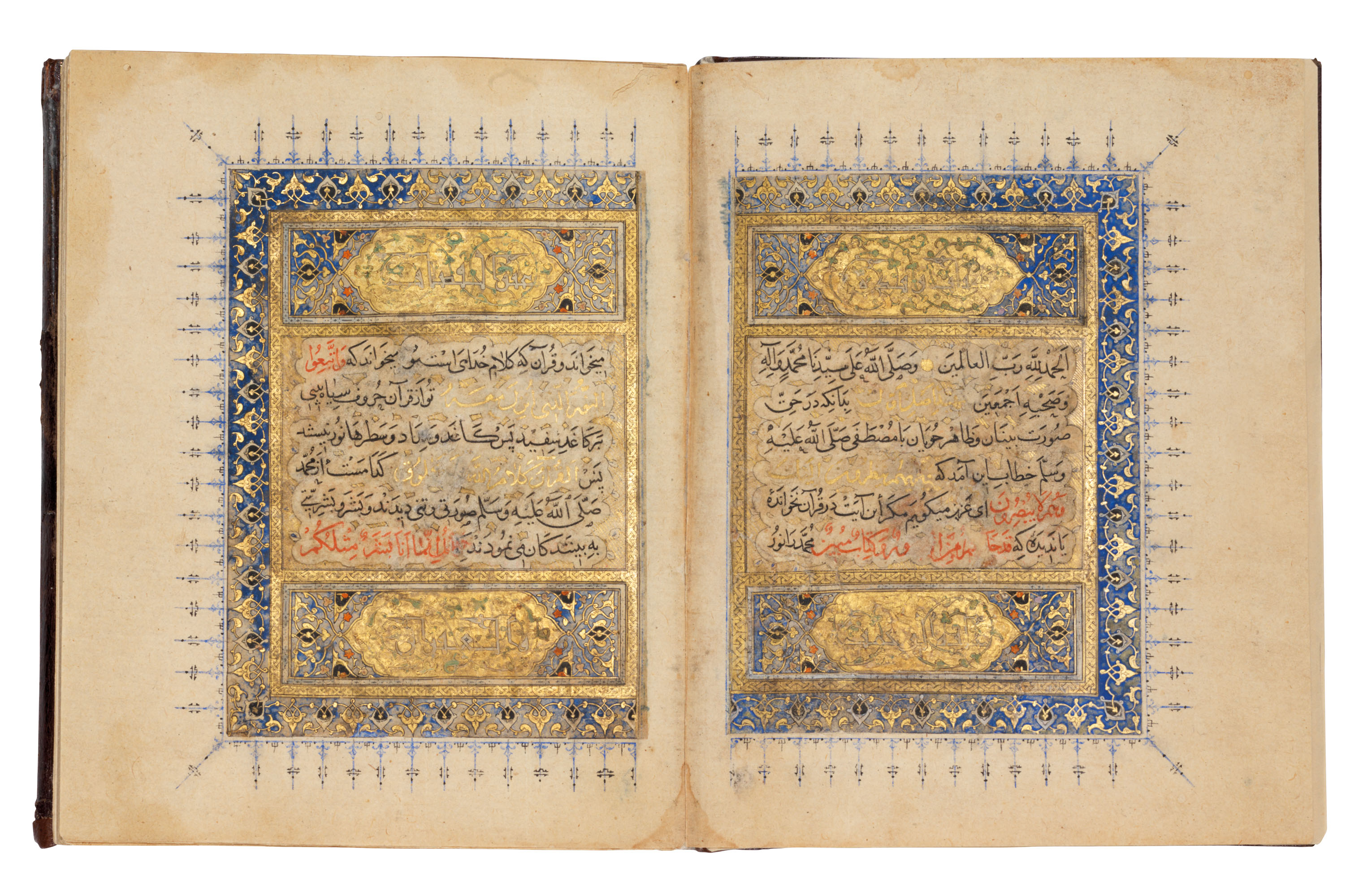
Manuscript of Hamadani's Tamhidat, copy created by Abu'l-Makarim ibn 'Ali al-Murshidi in Iran during the Timurid or Aq Qoyunlu period, dated 1461-62

Ayn-al-Qużāt Hamadānī, also spelled Ain-al Quzat Hamedani or ʿAyn-al Qudat Hamadhani (1098–1131) (Persian: عین‌ القضات همدانی), was a Persian jurist, mystic, philosopher, poet and mathematician who was executed at the age of 33.

== Title ==
Ayn-al-Qużat in Arabic means "the pearl of the judges": Ayn means the eye, implying something very valuable, and Qozat is the plural of Qadi, which means judge.

== Life ==
Ayn al-Quzat was born in Hamedan and his ancestors were of Hamedan judges. His full name is Abu’l-maʿālī ʿabdallāh Bin Abībakr Mohammad Mayānejī (Persian: ابو المعالی عبدالله بن ابی‌ بکر محمد میانجی). He was a disciple of Ahmad Ghazali and devotee of Hallaj. He became a famous scholar at early age, and by the time he was thirty he was chosen to be a judge. Along with Abu Hamed Al-Ghazali, he is one of the founders of doctrinal Sufism. According to some accounts, he was briefly a pupil of Omar Khayyam. Upon his return from pilgrimage, Khayyam likely stayed in Hamadan for some time. It is possible that during his stay he became tutor to the young Ain al-Quzat. However, Aminrazavi (2007) believes that from the figures who may have studied with Khayyam Ain al-Quzat is the least likely and that arguing their association is wishful thinking by those who like to view Khayyam as a Sufi. Unlike most of the Sufis who have lived as respected and revered members of their communities, he fell afoul of the Seljuk rulers and was accused of heresy and executed, either by crucifixion or burning.

Ayn al-Quzat along with Mansur al-Hallaj and Shahab al-Din Suhrawardi are known as the three martyrs of Sufism.

== Work ==
The most significant works of Ayn al-Qożāt are Tamhīdāt (تمهیدات; Preludes) and Zubdat al-ḥaqāʾiq fī kašf al-ḵalāʾeq (زبدة الحقائق في کشف الخلائق; The Essence of Truth). Both books are masterpieces of Sufi literature and have mystical and philosophical significance. Ayn al-Qożāt Hamadānī quoted a few verses apparently in his own Iranian dialect (where it is called fahlavī; bayt-e pahlavī in a manuscript variant).

== Poetry ==
A famous quatrain is said to be his:

ما مرگ و شهادت از خدا خواسته ايم
وآن هم به سه چيز کم بها خواسته ايم
گر دوست چنين کند که ما خواسته ايم
مـا آتـش و نفـت و بـوريا خــواسـته ايم

Translation:

I want death and martyrdom from God
I want it in three low-priced things
If the friend (i.e. God) grant my wishes
I want fire and oil and straw

This quatrain refers to his execution by Caliph's order.

== See also ==
- Persian literature
- List of Persian poets and authors
