= Asrar al-Tawhid =

12th century Persian work about the Sufi mystic Abū-Sa'īd Abul-Khay

Asrar al-Tawhid fi Maghamat al-Sheikh Abusa'id (Persian: اسرار التوحید فی مقامات ابوسعید, Arabic: أسرار التوحيد في مقامات أبو سعيد, "The Mysteries of Unification") is a book of 12th century Persian literature about the Sufi mystic Abū-Sa'īd Abul-Khayr.

Thought to be written by Muhammad ibn Monavvar, one of Abul-Khayr's grandsons, 130 years after his death, it is also considered a landmark work of Sufi literature as well as one of the most outstanding Persian prose works of the 12th century.

A copy of this book has been derived from a scattered hand-written pages stored in a book in a Russian library and discovered by Valentin Zhukovski in 1899. Zhukovsky found 2 different copies of the same book, and published the first copy adding the second copy's differences on the side (as side notes or subscripts).

== See also ==
- Hagiography
- Persian literature
