= Al-Burda =

Poem in praise of Muhammad

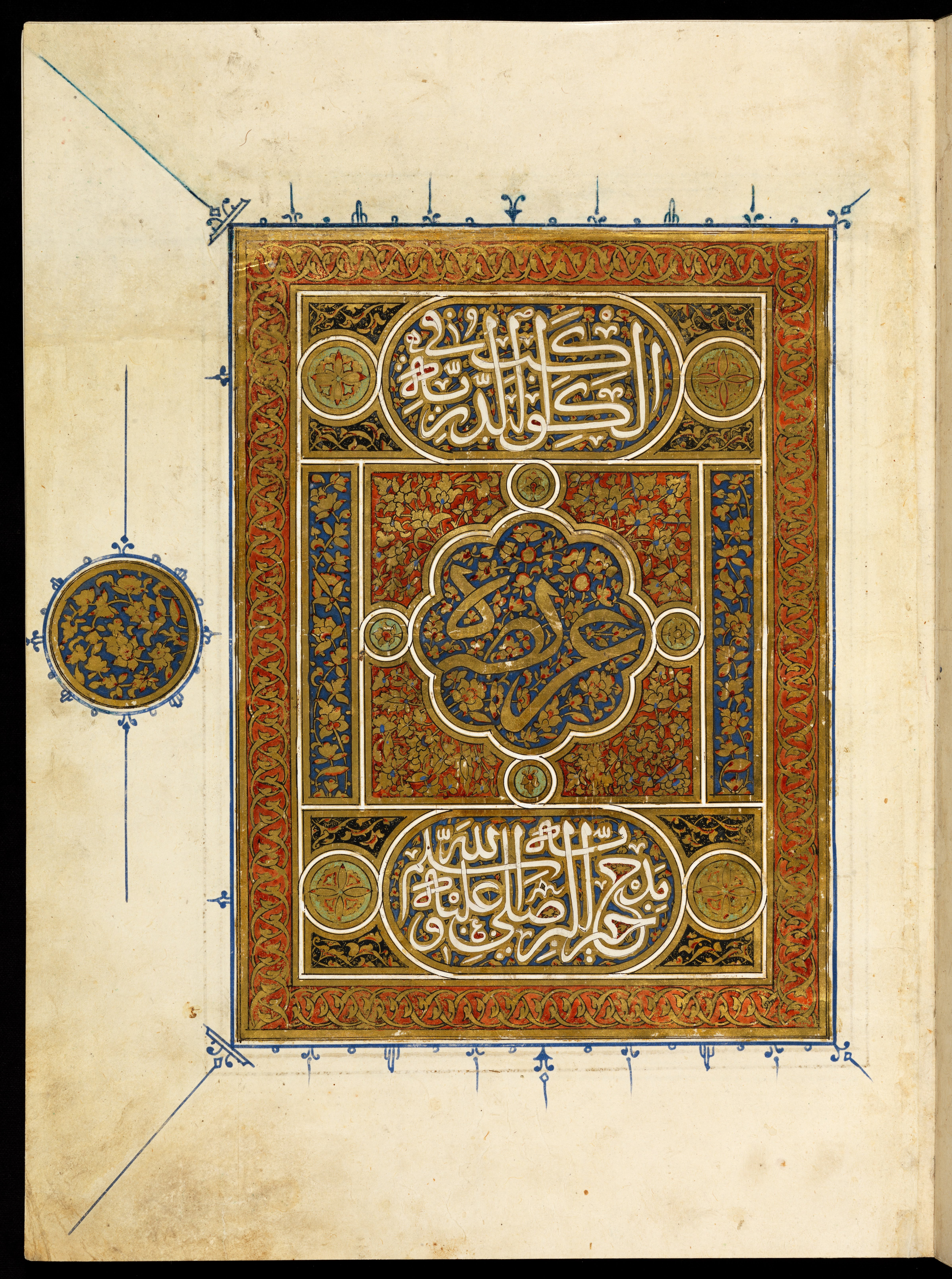
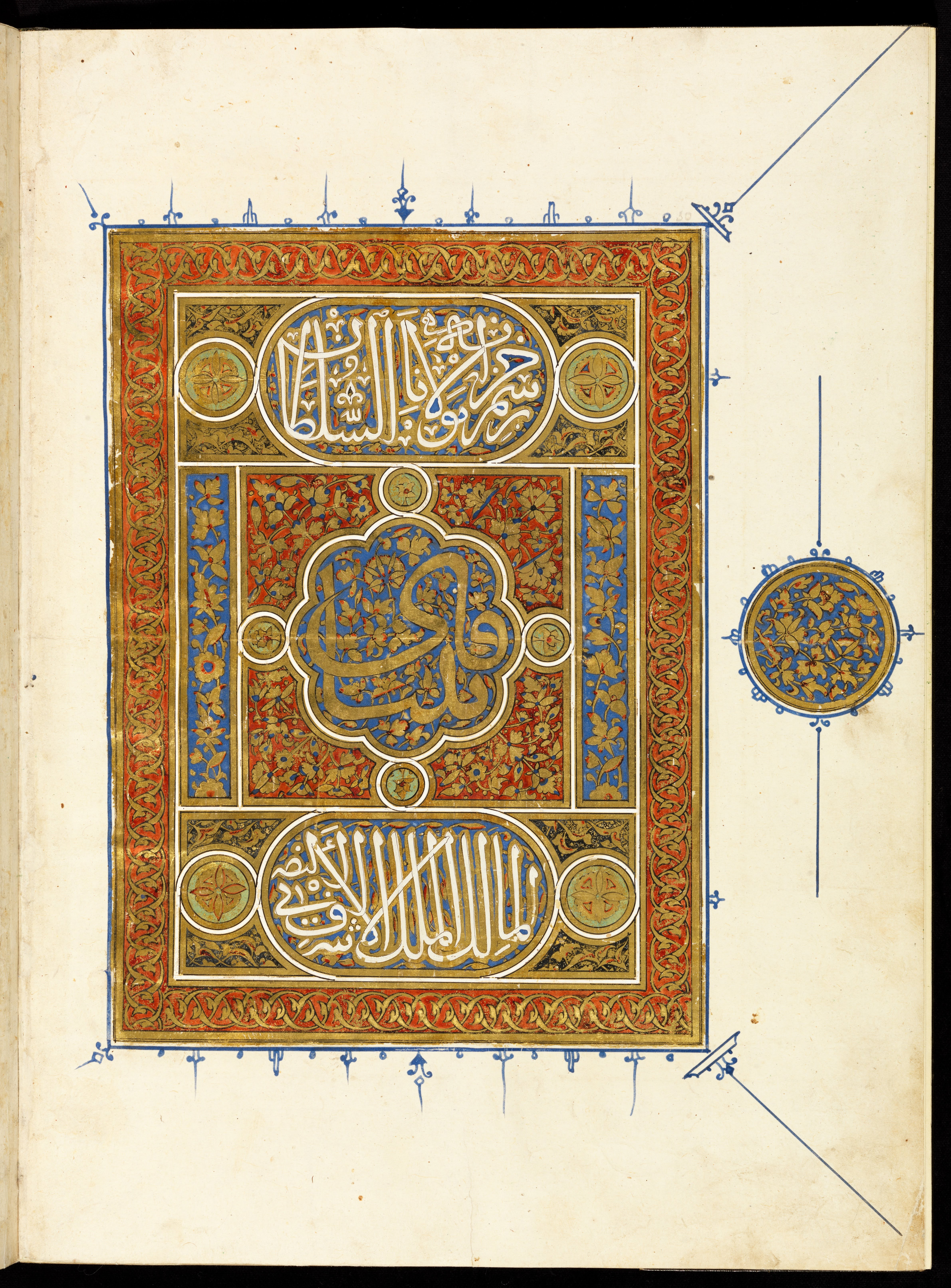
Illuminated frontispiece to the manuscript of Al-Kawākib ad-durriyya by Al-Busiri made for the sultan Qaitbay. Large lobed medallions in the center bear the name of the sultan (right) and blessing on him (left). Above and below on the right is the certificate of commissioning stating the manuscript to have been produced for his library, while opposite, on the facing page, the upper and lower panels contain the title of the work. Cairo, c. 1470. Chester Beatty Library.

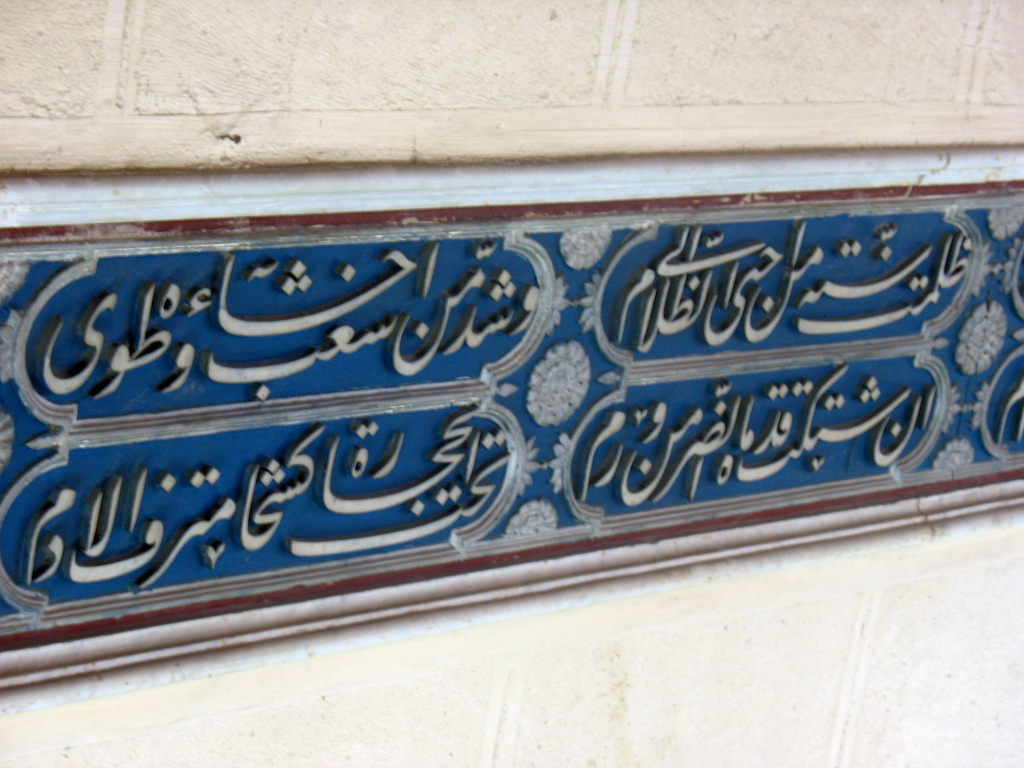
A verse from the Qaṣīdat al-Burda, displayed on the wall of al-Busiri's shrine in Alexandria

Qasīdat al-Burda (Arabic: قصيدة البردة, "Ode of the Mantle"), or al-Burda for short, is a thirteenth-century ode of praise for Muhammad composed by the Shadhili mystic al-Busiri of Egypt. The poem, whose actual title is "The Celestial Lights in Praise of the Best of Creation" (Arabic: الكواكب الدرية في مدح خير البرية, romanized: al-Kawākib al-durriyya fī Madḥ Khayr al-Bariyya), is famous mainly in the Muslim world. It is entirely in praise of Muhammad, who is said to have been praised ceaselessly by the afflicted poet, to the point that Muhammad appeared in a dream and wrapped him in a mantle or cloak; in the morning the poet discovers that God has cured him.

Bānat Suʿād, a poem composed by Ka'b ibn Zuhayr was originally called Al-Burda. He recited this poem in front of Muhammad after embracing Islam. Muhammad was so moved that he removed his mantle and wrapped it over him. The original Burdah is not as famous as the one composed by al-Busiri even though Muhammad had physically wrapped his mantle over Ka'b, not in a dream like in the case of al-Busiri.

== Composition ==
The Burda is divided into ten chapters and 160 verses, each rhyming with the other. Interspersing the verses is the refrain, "My Patron, confer blessings and peace continuously and eternally on Your Beloved, the Best of All Creation" (Arabic: مولاي صل وسلم دائما أبدا على حبيبك خير الخلق كلهم). Each verse ends with the Arabic letter mīm, a style called mīmiyya. The ten chapters of the Burda comprise:

- On Lyrical love yearnly
- On Warnings about the Caprices of the Self
- On the Praise of the Prophet
- On His Birth
- On His Miracles
- On the Exalted Stature and Miraculous Merits of the Qur'an
- On the Ascension of the Prophet
- On the Struggle of God's Messenger
- On Seeking Intercession through the Prophet
- On Intimate Discourse and the Petition of One's State.

== Popularity ==
Sufis have traditionally venerated the poem. It is memorized and recited in congregations, and its verses decorate the walls of public buildings and mosques. This poem decorated Prophet's Mosque in Medina for centuries but was erased except for two lines. Over 90 commentaries have been written on this poem. It has been translated by Timothy Winter into English. It has been additionally translated into Persian, Turkish, the Berber languages, Urdu, Punjabi, French, German, Sindhi, Saraiki, Hausa, Norwegian, Chinese (called Tianfangshijing), and other languages. It is known and recited by a large number of Muslims, ordinarily and on special occasions, such as Mawlid, making it one of the most recited poems in the world.

== Legacy ==
The Burda was accepted within Sufi Islam and was the subject of numerous commentaries by mainstream Sufi scholars such as Ibn Hajar al-Haytami, Nazifi and Qastallani. It was also studied by the Shafi'i hadith master Ibn Hajar al-Asqalani (d. 852 A.H.) both by reading the text out loud to his teacher and by receiving it in writing from a transmitter who heard it directly from Busiri himself.

Najdi bedouin scholar Muhammad ibn Abd al-Wahhab considered the poem to be shirk (idolatory).

Al-Burda was the inspiration behind Ahmad Shawqi's poem, Nahj al-Burda which follows a similar style.

The latest major work in the Burda quasi-genre is Tamim al-Barghouti's Burdat Tamim, which was written in November and December 2010, first published in 2013, and reorganized in 2020 as a five-part video series: the first three parts explain the three previous Burdas (Ka'b, al-Busiri, Shawqi), and the last two parts introduce Barghouti's Burda and explain the rationale behind its composition.

== See also ==
- Al-Busiri
- Salawat
- Islamic poetry

== Bibliography ==
- Blair, Sheila S.; Bloom, Jonathan M. (1995). The Art and Architecture of Islam. 1250 - 1800. Yale University Press. ISBN 978-0-300-05888-8.
- James, David (1983). The Arab Book. Chester Beatty Library.
