= Carl W. Ernst =

American Islamic studies scholar (born 1950)

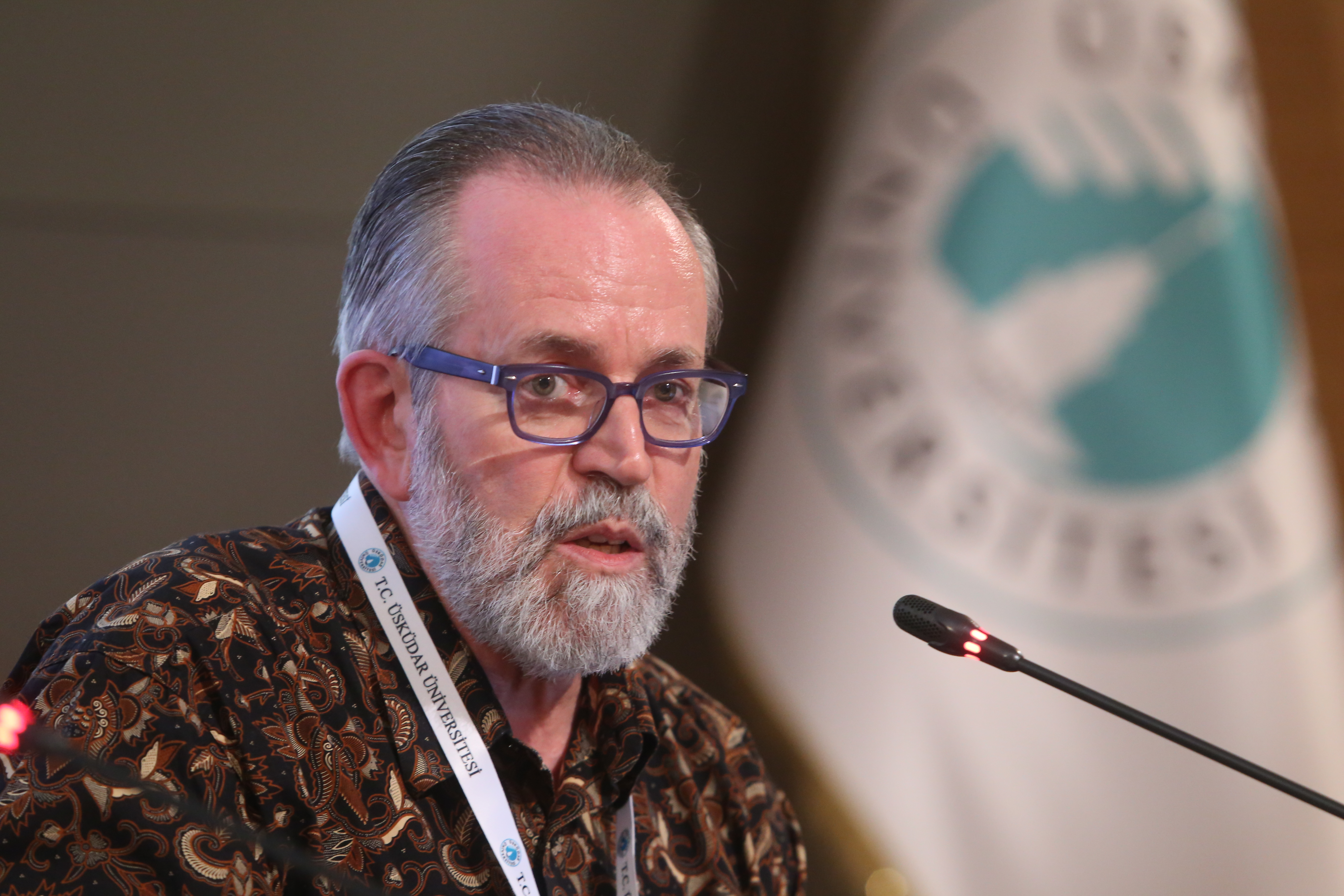

Carl W. Ernst (born September 8, 1950, in Los Angeles, California) is the William R. Kenan Jr., Distinguished Professor Emeritus of Islamic studies at the Department of Religious Studies at the University of North Carolina at Chapel Hill. He was also the founding director (2003–2022) of the UNC Center for Islamic and Middle East Studies.

== Life ==
Ernst received his A.B. in comparative religion at Stanford University in 1973, and his Ph.D. at Harvard University in 1981. He taught at Pomona College from 1981 to 1992. He was a professor at the University of North Carolina at Chapel Hill from 1992 to 2022.

It was his suggestion that set in motion the UNC-Qur'an Controversy in 2002, when UNC's Summer Reading Program required incoming students to read Michael Sells' Approaching the Qurʼan.

== Awards and honors ==
Ernst's book, Following Muhammad: Rethinking Islam in the Contemporary World (UNC Press, 2003), received several international awards, including the 2004 Bashrahil Prize for Outstanding Cultural Achievement. His book Ruzbihan Baqli: Mysticism and the Rhetoric of Sainthood in Persian Sufism won the Farabi Award. His translation from the Arabic, Hallaj: Poems of a Sufi Martyr, was supported by a John Simon Guggenheim Memorial Foundation Fellowship, and it was the first recipient (2017) of the Global Humanities Translation Prize from the Buffett Institute at Northwestern University.

Ernst has received several Fulbright fellowships (India, 1978–9; Pakistan, 1986; Spain, 2001; Malaysia, 2005), plus grants from the National Endowment for the Humanities, and he is a Fellow of the American Academy of Arts and Sciences. He has also been a visiting professor at the Ecole des Hautes Etudes en Sciences Sociales (1990, 2003, 2019, 2022).

== Bibliography ==
- I cannot write my life: Islam, Arabic, and slavery in Omar ibn Said's America. Islamic Civilization and Muslim Networks. Chapel Hill: The University of North Carolina Press. 2023. ISBN 978-1-4696-7466-7., with Mbaye Lo
- Refractions of Islam in India: Situating Sufism and Yoga, SAGE Publications India. (2016) ISBN 978-93-5150-964-6
- Islamophobia in America The Anatomy of Intolerance, Palgrave Macmillan (2013, editor) ISBN 978-1-137-29006-9
- How to Read the Qur'an: A New Guide, with Select Translations, University of North Carolina Press. (2011) ISBN 0-8078-3516-1
- Following Muhammad: Rethinking Islam in the Contemporary World, University of North Carolina Press. (2003) ISBN 0-8078-5577-4
- Sufi Martyrs of Love: Chishti Order in South Asia and Beyond (co-authored with Bruce Lawrence) (2002) ISBN 1-4039-6027-5
- Teachings of Sufism (1999) ISBN 1-57062-349-X
- A translation of The Unveiling of Secrets: Diary of a Sufi Master by Ruzbihan Baqli (1997) ISBN 0-9644362-1-3
- The Shambhala Guide to Sufism (1997) ISBN 1-57062-180-2
- Ruzbihan Baqli: Mysticism and the Rhetoric of Sainthood in Persian Sufism (1996) ISBN 0-7007-0342-X
- Eternal Garden: Mysticism, History, and Politics at a South Asian Sufi Center (1993) ISBN 0-19-566869-3
- Words of Ecstasy in Sufism (1985) ISBN 0-87395-917-5
