= Padar, Azerbaijan =

Padar, Azerbaijan may refer to:

- Padar, Agsu, Azerbaijan
- Padar, Davachi, Azerbaijan
- Padar, Hajigabul, Azerbaijan
- Padar, Khachmaz, Azerbaijan
- Padar, Oghuz, Azerbaijan
- Padar, Qubadli, Azerbaijan
- Padar, Shamakhi, Azerbaijan
- Padarqışlaq, Azerbaijan
