= Padar (tribe) =

Azerbaijani tribe

Padar (Azerbaijani: Padarlar) is a nomadic tribe and sub-ethnic group of Azerbaijani Turks, living mainly in Azerbaijan, which came to the region during the Mongol invasions.

== Name ==
The Padar tribe took its name from Baidar, son of Chagatai.

== History ==
At present the people of Padar live in Osko, Tabriz, in Dizaj Amirmaddar village. The Padar tribe was mentioned several times by Adam Olearius:

The word "Mordov" signifies "fen" and the village derives its name from the fenny places which lie about it, wherein there are many springs, which fend forth their water with such violence, that there is no cold so great as to congeal them. Whence it comes, that there are abundance of swans there, even in the winter, whose down is gather for the Sophy's Beds and Pillows. This Village is inhabited by certain people whom they call Padars, who have their particular language, though with some relation to the Turkish and Persian. Their religion is the Mohammedan (Sunni), inclining to the Turkish, but accompanied besides with infinite superstitions. Among others they have this, that they leave their meat after it is dressed, to grow almost cold before they eat it, and if it happen that any one, ignorant of their customs, should blow or breath upon it, they cast it away as impure.

The fifth we travell'd eight leagues through woody roads and deserts to the village of Koptepe. We saw by the way the Sepulchre of one of their Saints named Pyr Shykh Molla Yusuf, and met with party of five and twenty Horsemen well mounted and well arm'd. They said they were Country people of the adjacent Villages and that they were forc'd to go in strong parties and to travel so arm'd to secure themselves against the Robbers thereabouts but they look'd more like such themselves. For we understood afterwards that the inhabitants of the Village where we lodg'd that day were Padars. Their houses were built upon the ascent of certain little hills, half within, the Earth, being encompass'd about with knot of trees, which made delightful prospect from one house to another.

== Demographics ==
According to the first ethnographer of Azerbaijan, Mahammadhasan Valili-Baharlu, there were 200,000 Padar families when they came to Azerbaijan with the Ilkhanate hordes. In the 19th century, 218 Padar families of 20 lineages Djavad uyezd of Baku Governorate. Later sources report that this number grew up to 382 families. Right now 70% of Padars live in Shamakhy city.

== Toponyms ==
- Padar, Agsu, Azerbaijan
- Padar, Davachi, Azerbaijan
- Padar, Hajigabul, Azerbaijan
- Padar, Khachmaz, Azerbaijan
- Padar, Oghuz, Azerbaijan
- Padar, Qubadli, Azerbaijan
- Padar, Shamakhi, Azerbaijan
- Padarqışlaq, Azerbaijan
- Padar, Derbend, Dagestan

== Notable people ==
- Sheikh Dursun ibn Ahmad Padar – (also known as "Pir-i Shirvan") was important religious figure in Shirvan. His tomb is 1 km away from Agsu town centre, regarded as pir.
- Sheikh Abdullah Padar (died 28 April 1905) – descendant of Sheikh Dursun, famous poet.
- Sheikh Muhammad al-Qaramani (died. 1790) – religious figure born in Padar, Oghuz.
- Gorchibashi Padar – famous commander who played instrumental role in Safavid conquest of Shirvan.
