= Falaki Shirvani =

12th century Persian poet

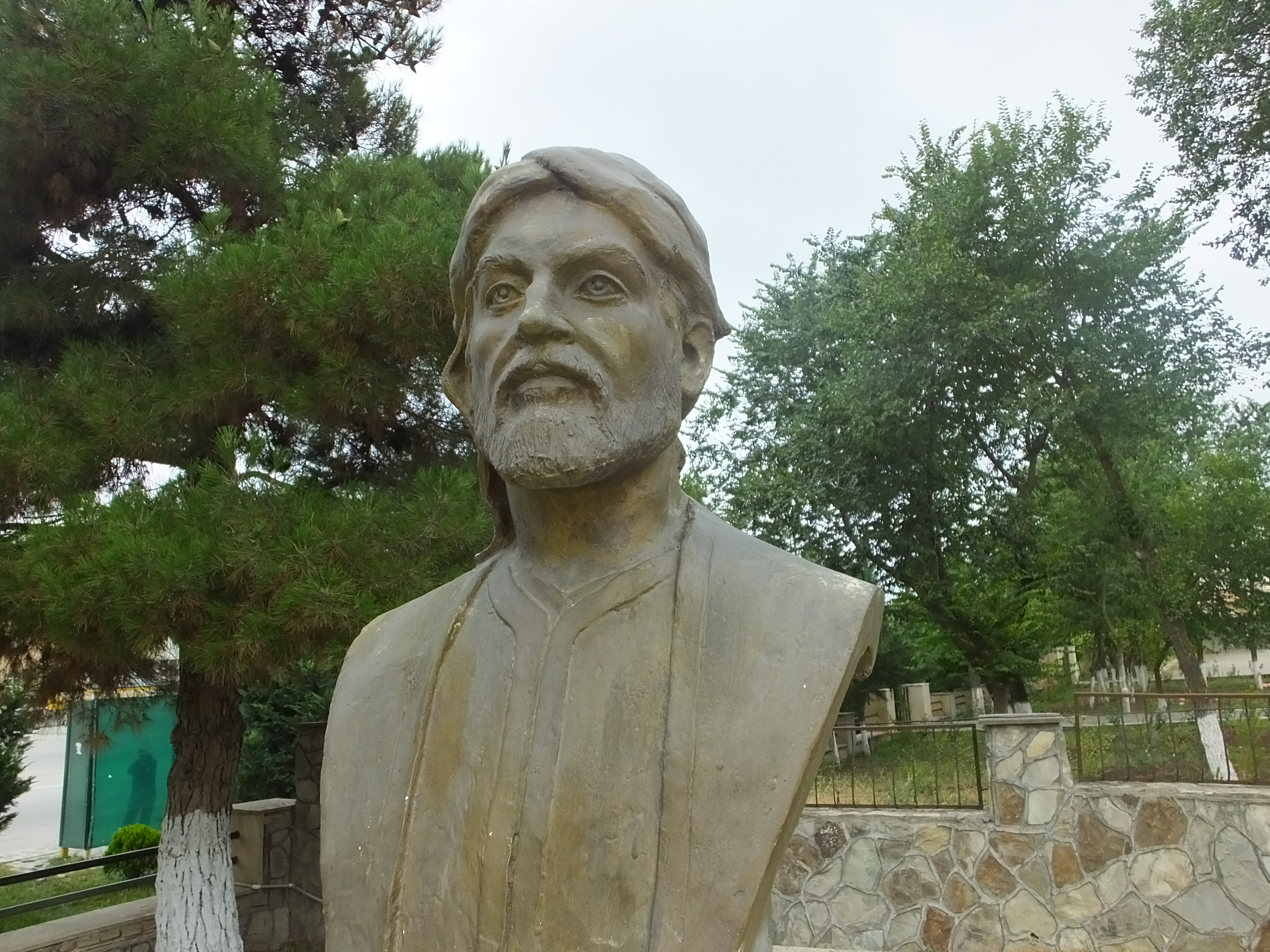
- Picture of Falaki Shirvani's bust in Museum of History and Ethnography in Shamakhi
- Native name: محمد فلکی
- Born: 1107 Shamakhi, Shirvan
- Died: c. 1155 (aged 47–48) Shirvan
- Occupation: Poet
- Language: Persian
- Genre: Habsiyat

Muhammad Falaki (Persian: محمد فلکی; 1107–1155), commonly known as Falaki Shirvani (فلکی شروانی) was a poet who served at the court of the Shirvanshah Manuchihr III (r. 1120 – after 1160). A student of the poet Khaqani, Falaki is known to have authored a Persian divan (collection of poems), of which 1,512 verses have survived. He played a leading role in the early development of the habsiyat (prison poetry), a genre in Persian literature.

Like other poets of his time, Falaki was imprisoned due to the libel spread by his rivals. It has been surmised Falaki died soon after his release as a result of the stress he had endured there.

== Biography ==
Of Persian descent, Falaki Shirvani was born in 1107 in the city of Shamakhi in Shirvan, a region now located in present-day Azerbaijan. The city served as the capital of the rulers of Shirvan, the Shirvanshahs. In his work, Falaki calls himself "Muhammad Falaki", but some tadhkirahs (collection of biographies) refer to him by other names, such as Abu'l-Nizam Jalalu'd-Din, Afsahu'd-Din, Najmu'd-Din, or Mu'ayyidu'd-Din Uthman. "Falaki" was his pen name with his real name being Muhammad. Due to the former meaning "astronomer" and the poet Khaqani mentioning that Falaki was "aware of the mysteries of the nine spheres" it could be surmised that Falaki was a professional astronomer. However, this could have also been a word-play by Khaqani. Falaki was a student of Khaqani, despite being older.

According to a story reported by later biographers such as Dawlatshah Samarqandi, both Falaki and Khaqani were students of the poet Abu'l-Ala Ganjavi. Khaqani married Abu'l-Ala Ganjavi's daughter while Falaki was given 20,000 dirhams, which he was let down by. Abu'l-Ala Ganjavi told Falaki that with that money he could buy fifty Turkish handmaidens more beautiful than Khaqani's new wife. Iranologist Anna Livia Beelaert does not consider this story to be real, arguing that no parts of it is mentioned in Khaqani's writings, which mentions both Falaki and Abu'l-Ala Ganjavi. Falaki had a wife who died shortly after giving birth to their daughter. His remaining relatives (with the exception of his daughter) also died. Like Khaqani and Abu'l-Ala Ganjavi, Falaki served as a court poet of the Shirvanshah Manuchihr III (r. 1120 – after 1160).

Like other poets of his time (Khaqani, Mujir al-Din Baylaqani, and probably Abu'l-Ala Ganjavi), Falaki was imprisoned due to libel spread by his rivals. His imprisonment took place in the fortress of Shabaran, where he stayed for some time. After being freed, Falaki wrote an ode in which he claimed that his confinement had almost killed him and left him a "mere skeleton". It is uncertain whether Falaki was allowed back into the royal court or not. The Indian scholar Hadi Hasan, noting that Khaqani reported Falaki's death as "premature", considered it more plausible that Falaki soon died as a result of the stress he had endured during his imprisonment.

The death of Manuchihr III is not mentioned in Falaki's writings, which indicates that Falaki died before him. Based on this, the suggestion by authors such as Taqi Kashi that Falaki died in 1181/82 has been dismissed by historian Francois de Blois. Hadi Hasan surmised that Falaki died in c. 1155 in Shirvan. According to Taqi Kashi, Falaki was buried in Shamakhi. Khaqani dedicated a eulogy to him.

== Works ==
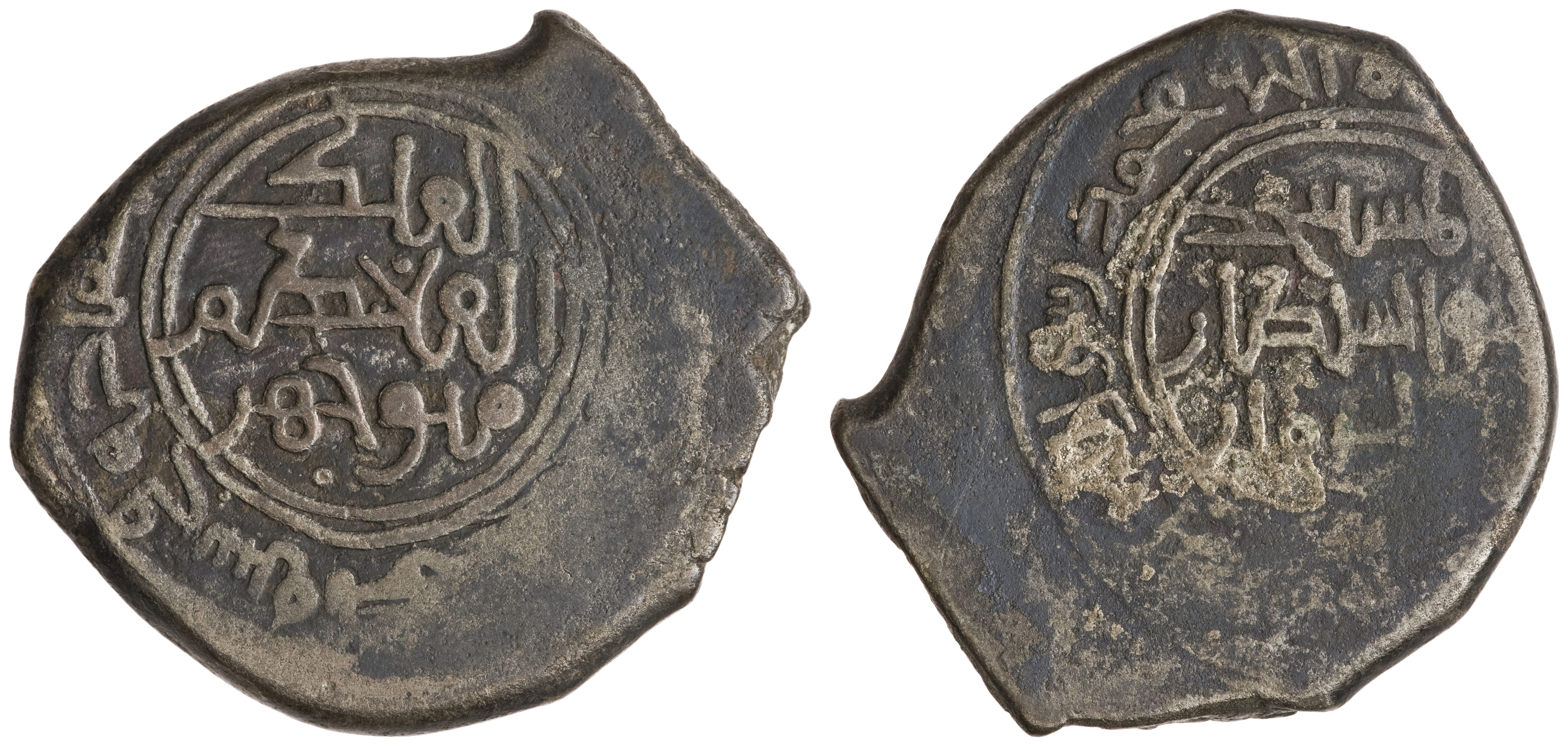
Coin of the Shirvanshah Manuchihr III, minted at Shamakhi between 1120 and 1160

Falaki is known to have authored a Persian divan (collection of poems), of which 1,512 verses have survived. In 1929, Hadi Hasan published his collection of Falaki's poems which he had gathered from an anthology in Munich and poetry referenced in other works. In 1958, he published an updated version based on newly-found poems in a manuscript from Madras and a revised version of his previous collection. The only ruler that appears in Falaki's work is Manuchihr III, whom Falaki describes in several scenarios, such as his victory against the Alans and "Khazars" (Kipchaks), how he seized parts of Arran, how he had the cities of Kardinan and Sa'dun constructed, and how he restored the Bakilani dam.

Falaki is the first known Shirvani composer of the habsiyat (prison poetry) genre, and also played a role in its early development. There are three important words in the genre: gham (sorrow), mihnat (affliction) and ranj (suffering). These words began to set themselves apart from one another at the early stage of the development of genre. Gham communicates a gloomy resignation. Mihnat conveys enduring injustice that is connected to a universal state. Poets in Shirvan started to use the word mihnat to convey the same physical tiredness as its equivalent ranj. This lexicon was first assembled by Falaki:

I drown in such affliction [mihnat], that I don’t care [gham] for this endless suffering [ranj].

The prison poetry genre was created by a Persian poet under the Ghaznavids, Masud Sa'd Salman, whom Falaki claimed to be below him in terms of style. Falaki displayed anxiety of influence, trying to make the accomplishments of Masud Sa'd Salman seem less important, whilst also using the latter's trademark genre. Historian Rebecca Gould considers Falaki's impact in prison poetry to pale in comparison to Masud Sa'd Salman's, but maintains that he still played an important role in the genre, contributing to its geographical and cross-generational transmission.

Falaki considered himself to be on the same level as Abu Nuwas (died 810) and Abu Tammam (died 846). The Czech orientalist Jan Rypka considered it "strange" that Falaki did not think of any contemporary poet who merited mention. Both Salman Savaji (died 1376) and Ismat Bukhara'i (died 1425/26) are known to have copied Falaki's style of poetry, though the former never admitted it. According to Gould, the works of Falaki, Khaqani, Abu'l-Ala Ganjavi and Mujir al-Din Baylaqani fully supports the claim made by academics that the Persianate Caucasus developed a distinctive literary tradition comparable to that of Bukhara, Khwarazm, and Khurasan.

== Sources ==
- Beelaert, Anna Livia (2010). "Ḵāqāni Šervāni i. Life". In Yarshater, Ehsan (ed.). Encyclopædia Iranica. Vol. XV/5: Ḵamsa of Jamāli–Karim Devona. London and New York: Routledge & Kegan Paul. pp. 522–523. ISBN 978-1-934283-28-8.
- de Blois, Francois (1999). "Falakī Šarvānī". In Yarshater, Ehsan (ed.). Encyclopædia Iranica. Vol. IX/2: Excavations IV–Fārābī V. Music. London and New York: Routledge & Kegan Paul. p. 169. ISBN 978-0-933273-27-6.
- de Blois, Francois (2004). Persian Literature - A Bio-Bibliographical Survey: Poetry of the Pre-Mongol Period (Volume V). Routledge. ISBN 978-0947593476.
- Bosworth, C. E. (2011a). "Šervānšāhs". Encyclopaedia Iranica.
- Bosworth, C. E. (2011b). "Šervān". Encyclopaedia Iranica.
- Gould, Rebecca Ruth (2022). The Persian Prison Poem. Edinburgh University Press. ISBN 978-1474484015.
- Hasan, Hadi (1929). Falaki-i-Shirwani: His Times, Life, and Works. University of London.
- Hasan, Hadi (1965). "Falakī S̲h̲irwānī". In Lewis, B.; Pellat, Ch. & Schacht, J. (eds.). The Encyclopaedia of Islam, Second Edition. Volume II: C–G. Leiden: E. J. Brill. p. 764. OCLC 495469475.
- Rypka, Jan (1968). "Poets and Prose Writers of the Late Seljuq and Mongol Periods". In Boyle, John Andrew (ed.). The Cambridge History of Iran: The Saljuq and Mongol Periods. Vol. 5. Cambridge: Cambridge University Press. pp. 550–625. ISBN 0-521-06936-X.
