= Yergüc, Quba =

Yerguj
- Azerbaijani: Yergüc
- Location within Azerbaijan
- Coordinates: 41°12′34″N 48°17′35″E
- Country: Azerbaijan
- District: Quba

Population
  - Total: 0
- Time zone: UTC+4 (AZT)
  - Summer (DST): UTC+5 (AZT)

Yergüc (also, Yerguj) is an abandoned village in the mountainous western part of Quba District, Azerbaijan. There were seven clans. However, the people have long since moved to more accessible locations. Some of its former population still speak their own dialect, one of the Shahdagh village languages related to that of nearby Buduq. The main concentration of Yergüc people is in the village of the same name in Khachmaz District though they are also to be found in that region's villages of Sərkərli, Armudpadar, Hacıəlibəy and Uzunoba along with others in Davudoba of Quba District.

The folk-poet Ashig Abdulaziz hailed from Yerguj.
