= Adnalı =

Adnalı may refer to:

- Adnalı, Jalilabad, Azerbaijan
- Adnalı, Shamakhi, Azerbaijan
