= Padar =

Padar may refer to:

- Padar tribe, a nomadic Turkic tribe living in Azerbaijan

== People ==
- Anita Pádár (born 1979), Hungarian footballer
- Gerli Padar (born 1979), Estonian singer
- Ildikó Pádár (born 1970), Hungarian handball player
- Ivari Padar (born 1965), Estonian politician
- Martin Padar (born 1979), Estonian judoka
- Tanel Padar (born 1980), Estonian singer

== Places ==
- Padar (island), a small island part of Lesser Sunda Islands in Indonesia located within Komodo National Park
- Padar, Azerbaijan (disambiguation), several places
- Padar (Jammu and Kashmir), a region in Jammu and Kashmir, India
- Padar, Rewa, a village in Madhya Pradesh, India
- Padar, Iran, a village in Razavi Khorasan Province, Iran
- Padar, Republic of Dagestan, a rural locality in Dagestan, Russia

== See also ==
- Poddar, an Indian surname
