= Zunnar =

Type of identifying mark in historic Islamic societies

Zunnar (also spelled "zunar" or "zonar"; Arabic: زنار zunār) was a distinctive belt or girdle, part of the clothing that Dhimmi (e.g. Jews, Christians and Zoroastrians) were required to wear during the Middle Ages in regions under Islamic rule. Though not always enforced, the zunnar served as a tool to distinguish the dhimmi from Muslims and, together with a set of other rules, of discrimination.

== Etymology ==
The word originates the Greek ζώνη (zōne), 'belt', 'girdle', probably via Aramaic zunnārā. In Syriac, it denotes the girdle worn by monks.

== Description ==
The zunnar was usually wider than a regular belt (mintaka) as to make it distinguishable. The zunnar was often worn with other clothes that belonged to the range of clothes non-Muslims were required to wear, including head coverings and cloaks such as the qalansuwa and burnus, the ruqʿa (badge placed over the shoulder), and shiʿar (a general term for any mark that singled out dhimmi as non-Muslims). The zunnar and the related clothes were linked to the code of ghiyār, the compulsory distinctive mark in the dress of dhimmis under Muslim rule.

The requirement to wear distinctive clothes such as the zunnar has been attributed to the so-called Covenant of Umar, however this covenant seems to have been a set of practices that were only formalised in around the ninth century. It seems likely that the belt was only one part of the intention to oblige non-Muslims to keep their usual costumes as to prevent them from being confused with Muslims and was not overtly at this stage a tool of ethnic discrimination. As such, the requirement seems to have been for Christians (Jews are initially not mentioned) to wear a distinctive sash (the zunnar) and a distinctive sign or mark on their headgear and that of their animals. In case of omission of belt, the punishment could be whipping, imprisonment or public humiliation.

The wearing of the zunnar was not always enforced, especially during the early period under Islamic rules when the Muslim conquerors constituted a minority in the newly conquered lands. Modern scholarship connect the institutionalisation of the discriminatory practises such as the zunnar with the reign of Umar ibn Abd al-Aziz, who was known for his generally hardline attitude towards non-Muslims.The first clear legal code that obliges dhimmi to wear the zunnar (and a specific headgear) is the Kitab al-Kharaj from the reign of Abbasid caliph Harun al-Rashid, though it might not have been enforced. Later Muslim rulers often re-issued the laws of ghiyār in order to appear as pious either at the beginning of their reign or during times of social or political stress. It seems that the ninth century was a turning point in which Islamic authorities begun to harden their position on ghiyār. Harun al-Rashid's grandson al-Mutawakkil issued a decree in 850 forcing dhimmi to wear the zunnar as well as certain yellow coloured outer garments, starting the tradition to use colours and badges for differentiation. It is uncertain how long the regulation was in place, as similar laws were issued in 907/908 during the rule of al-Muqtadir, possibly indicating that enforcement was sporadic and short-lived. The Seljuks also periodically enforced the discriminatory dress code, such as under Sultan Mahmud who ordered Jews to wear a piece of lead hanging around the neck and the zunnar, which led to Muslims mocking and beating Jews in the streets of Bagdhad.

The Fatimid caliphate, which ruled over Egypt and parts of the Levant, had in general a lax attitude towards the discriminatory laws proscribed in sharia towars dhimmi with the exception of caliph al-Hakim, who ordered Christians and Jews to wear a black zunnar. By the late Ayyubid period the wearing of ghiyār clothes seems to have been norm as indicated by Cairo Geniza documents. One letter mentions that in 1249 it was announced that the property and life of any Jew or Christian walking in the streets by day or night without a distinguishing badge or zunnar would be forfeit. The trend of stricter enforcement continued under the Mamluk Sultanate which in 1301 purged Christians and Jews from administrative positions and additionally forced Christians to wear the zunnar and a blue turban.

In early twentieth century Jemen(Yemen), Jews were required to wear twenty centimeter long sidelocks, also called payot, as distinguishing badge that were known as zanānir, going back to the original zunnar belt.

== Zunnar as symbol ==
The zunnar as an image was widespread in the Muslim word, shaping its disciplines and lexicons and evoked the binary divisions that legitimated discrimination against minorities. It was also used in poetry, such as in the prison poems of Khaqani. Whereas Khaqani used the image of the zunnar as sign for imprisonment or discrimination, Amir Khusraw and Muhammad Iqbal used it as symbol for syncretism that transcends religious identities. On the other hand, Mughal Emperor Babur represented the zunnar as a sign of divine disfavour and associated it with apostasy, writing of a group of his enemies as wearing "the accursed band of the zunnar around their neck".

== Modern usage ==
- In 2001, the Taliban in Afghanistan required Afghan Hindus to wear yellow badges.
- Zunnar is a Palestinian article of clothing used mainly as a belt around the waist.

== See also ==
- Clothing laws by country
- Kushti worn by Zoroastrians
- Himiana worn by Mandaeans
- Yellow badge worn by Jews
- Zone (vestment)

== Sources ==
- Casiday, Augustine (2012). The Orthodox Christian World. Routledge. ISBN 978-0-415-45516-9.
- Gould, Rebecca Ruth (7 December 2021). Persian Prison Poem: Sovereignty and the Political Imagination. Edinburgh University Press. ISBN 978-1-4744-8404-6.
- Hoyland, Robert (24 March 2021). Muslims and Others in Early Islamic Society. Routledge. ISBN 978-1-351-91618-9.
- Roth, Norman (5 July 2017). "Clothing". Routledge Revivals: Medieval Jewish Civilization (2003): An Encyclopedia. Taylor & Francis. ISBN 978-1-351-67698-4.
- Stillman, Yedida (2003). Arab Dress. A Short History: From the Dawn of Islam to Modern Times. Leiden Boston: BRILL. ISBN 9004135936.
