= Rypka =

Rypka may refer to:

- Ritinis, a Lithuanian national sports game
- Rypka, the ball used in the game of ritinis
- Jan Rypka (1886-1968), Czech orientalist, translator, professor of Iranology
