= Yergüc =

Yergüc or Yergyudzh may refer to:

- Yergüc, Khachmaz, Azerbaijan
- Yergüc, Quba, Azerbaijan
