= Geoglyar =

Geoglyar may refer to:

- Göylər Çöl, Azerbaijan
- Göylərdağ, Azerbaijan
