= Garib Karimoğlu =

Azerbaijani politician

member of the Parliament of the Azerbaijan Democratic Republic
- In office 1918–1920
- Appointed by: Azerbaijan Democratic Republic

Personal details
- Born: 1870 Xaçmaz, Nukha uezd, Russian Empire
- Died: 1926 (aged 55–56) Padar, Oghuz, Azerbaijan SSR, USSR

Garib Mahammadkarim oğlu Karimoğlu or Garib Yüzbashi (1870 in Xaçmaz, Nukha uezd – 1926 in Padar, Oghuz, Azerbaijan, Soviet Union) — member of the Parliament of the Azerbaijan Democratic Republic, chairman of the executive committee of Vartashen district, member of the Ahrar Party.

== Life ==
Garib Karimoglu was born in Khachmaz in 1870 and moved to Padar village in 1912. He served as an officer in the Imperial Russian Army. In 1912, on his initiative, a machine was brought to Azerbaijan from Germany for the first time to obtain flour. That car is currently kept as a monument in the neighboring village of Yemişanli.

During the Azerbaijan Democratic Republic, Garib Karimoglu was the chairman of the executive committee of Vartashen district of Shaki district. On December 15, 1918, Garib Karimoglu was elected a member of the Parliament of the Azerbaijan Democratic Republic from Nukha district. He was a member of the Ahrar faction in the parliament. On April 24, 1919, he was elected a member of the Land Commission of the Parliament of the Azerbaijan Democratic Republic. On March 11, he resigned from his position due to illness.

After Azerbaijan was occupied by the Bolsheviks, it gave all its wealth to the Bolsheviks. Although the Bolsheviks wanted to arrest him, the local population prevented it.
