= Abu'l-Ala Ganjavi =

12th-century poet

Abu'l-Ala Ganjavi (Persian: ابوالعلا گنجوی) or Abul'alā-ye Ganje'i (Persian: ابوالعلای گنجه‌ای, lit. 'Abul'alā of Ganja') was a Persian poet of the 12th century at the court of the Shirvanshahs. He is also known as the "Master of Poets" (استاد الشعرا Ostād osh-Sho'arā), for he became the master in poetry of Khaqani, introducing him to the court of Khaqan Manuchehr Shirvanshah, as well as of Falaki.

== Sources ==
- Sajjādi, Ż. (1983). "Abu'l-ʿAlāʾ Ganjavī". In Yarshater, Ehsan (ed.). Encyclopædia Iranica. Vol. I/3: Ablution, Islamic–Abū Manṣūr Heravı̄. London and New York: Routledge & Kegan Paul. pp. 252–253. ISBN 978-0-71009-092-8.
- Beelaert, Anna Livia (2010). "Ḵāqāni Šervāni i. Life". In Yarshater, Ehsan (ed.). Encyclopædia Iranica. Vol. XV/5: Ḵamsa of Jamāli–Karim Devona. London and New York: Routledge & Kegan Paul. pp. 522–523. ISBN 978-1-934283-28-8.
- de Blois, Francois (2004). Persian Literature - A Bio-Bibliographical Survey: Poetry of the Pre-Mongol Period (Volume V). Routledge. ISBN 978-0947593476.
- Gould, Rebecca Ruth (2022). The Persian Prison Poem. Edinburgh University Press. ISBN 978-1474484015.
- Hasan, Hadi (1929). Falaki-i-Shirwani: His Times, Life, and Works. University of London.
- Rypka, Jan (1968). "Poets and Prose Writers of the Late Seljuq and Mongol Periods". In Boyle, John Andrew (ed.). The Cambridge History of Iran. Vol. 5. Cambridge: Cambridge University Press. pp. 550–625. ISBN 0-521-06936-X.
