= Sheikh Dursun Mausoleum =

- Azerbaijani: Şeyx Dursun türbəsi
- Location within Azerbaijan

General information
- Type: Mausoleum
- Architectural style: Architectural school of Shirvan-Absheron
- Location: Agsu, Azerbaijan
- Coordinates: 40.572788°N 48.382820°E
- Completed: XV century

Height
- Height: 3 m (9.8 ft)

The mausoleum of Sheikh Dursun is a historic tomb located in north-east of Agsu in Azerbaijan.

== History ==
The date of construction of the monument is shown as 1457 in the materials of Agsu Museum of History and Local Lore and in many articles of "Birlik" newspaper published in Agsu district. There is an inscription on the tomb, which consists of two lines. As a result of partial disruption of the inscription on the monument, there are various views on the history of the tomb. According to these writings, Ahmed Padar's son Sheikh Dursun, who died in 1399, is buried inside the mausoleum.

Professor Mashadikhanum Nemat read the writings of the inscription as:

This pleasantly beautiful sacred (sanctuary) and lighted mausoleum belongs to the most prominent of saints Sheikh Dursun bin Ahmad Padar. His death took place in Dhu al-Hijjah month, in the eight hundred and first year (VIII-IX 1399).

== Architectural features ==
The mausoleum is built of whitestones. It is in the form of an eight-sided pyramid. The width of each side is 1,6 meters and its height is 3 meters. The top of the monument is also in the shape of an eight-sided prism in accordance with the body of the building. The entrance of the tomb consists of three whole hewn stones: two sides portals and the upper part of the entrance is built of whitestones. The top part of the monument is covered with a cone-shaped arch.

== See also ==
- Padar tribe
