= Padhar (disambiguation) =

Padhar is a Hindu caste from Gujarat.

Padhar may also refer to:

- Padhar, Mandi, Himachal Pradesh, a village near Mandi, Himachal Pradesh
- Padhar dance, a dance form of the Padhar people
- Padharia, a tribe in Gujarat,India

See Also

Padar (disambiguation)

Paddar, a subdivision in Kishtwar district of Jammu and Kashmir
