= Meysəri =

Meysəri Մեյսարի • Meysari
- Municipality
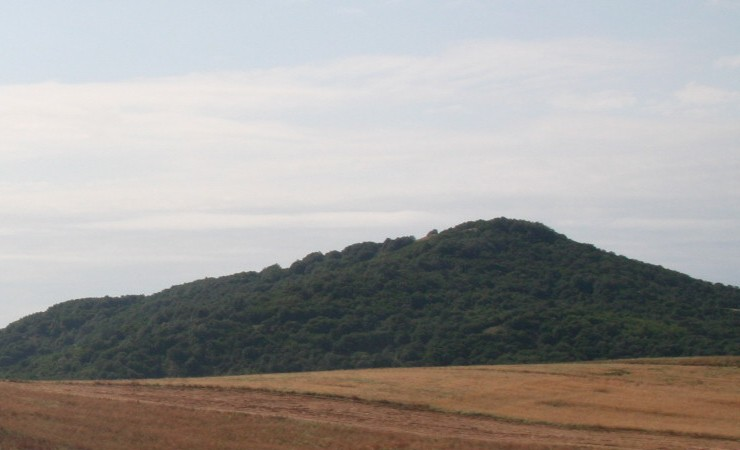

- Location within Azerbaijan
- Coordinates: 40°39′57″N 48°35′11″E
- Country: Azerbaijan
- District: Shamakhi

Population
  - Total: 624
- Time zone: UTC+4 (AZT)

Meysəri (also Meysary; Armenian: Մեյսարի, romanized: Meysari) is a village and municipality in the Shamakhi District of Azerbaijan. It has a population of 624. The village had an Armenian population before the exodus of Armenians from Azerbaijan after the outbreak of the Nagorno-Karabakh conflict.

In Meysary there were two Armenian Apostolic churches: Surb Nshan and Surb Astvatsatsin. Surb Astvatsatsin was blown up in 1972.

== Population ==
In the 19th and early 20th centuries, Meysari was predominantly an Armenian-populated village. According to various statistical and administrative sources:

Year	Households/Families	Population	Notes	Source
1820	18 families	–	Included 7 native families, 1 kevkha (village official), and 10 newcomer families from Karabakh	Description of the Shirvan Province, 1820
1855	–	–	All residents were Armenian-Gregorians, speaking Armenian and "Tatar" (Azerbaijani)	Caucasian Calendar, 1856
1856–64	59 households	309 Armenians	The village had a church and a monastery	List of Settlements of the Russian Empire: Baku Governorate
1873	59 households	397 Armenians	–	Caucasus Data Collection, vol. 5
1886	87 households	495 Armenians	–	Statistical Data of the Transcaucasian Region, 1886
1911	114 households	779 Armenians	–	Baku Governorate Statistical Collection, 1911
1914	–	705 Armenians	–	Caucasian Calendar, 1915
1921	–	348 Armenians (290 present)	Some were absent at the time of the census	1921 Agricultural Census of Azerbaijan, vol. 1, part 1
