= Acıdərə =

- Location within Azerbaijan
- Coordinates: 40°31′42″N 48°44′30″E
- Country: Azerbaijan
- Rayon: Shamakhi
- Municipality: Göylər

Population (2014)
  - Total: 1
- Time zone: UTC+4 (AZT)
  - Summer (DST): UTC+5 (AZT)

Acıdərə (also, Adzhidere and Akhzhidara) is a village in the Shamakhi Rayon of Azerbaijan. The village forms part of the municipality of Göylər. According to Azerbaijan's State Statistics Committee, only one person lived in the village as of 2014.
