= Məlcək =

- Location within Azerbaijan
- Coordinates: 40°38′N 48°34′E
- Country: Azerbaijan
- Rayon: Shamakhi
- Municipality: Mirikənd
- Time zone: UTC+4 (AZT)
  - Summer (DST): UTC+5 (AZT)

Məlcək (also, Mel’dzhek) is a village in the Shamakhi Rayon of Azerbaijan. The village forms part of the municipality of Mirikənd.
