= Dərəgünəş =

Dədəgünəş
- Location within Azerbaijan
- Coordinates: 40°38′42″N 48°38′02″E
- Country: Azerbaijan
- Rayon: Shamakhi
- Time zone: UTC+4 (AZT)
  - Summer (DST): UTC+5 (AZT)

Dərəgünəş (also, Dere-Khanysty and Dere-Khynysly) is a village in the Shamakhi Rayon of Azerbaijan.
