= Dərəkərkənc =

Dərəkərkənc Դարա-Քարքանջ • Dara-Karkanj
- Location within Azerbaijan
- Coordinates: 40°34′N 48°31′E
- Country: Azerbaijan
- District: Shamakhi
- Time zone: UTC+4 (AZT)

Dərəkərkənc (Armenian: Դարա-Քարքանջ, romanized: Dara-Karkanj, also Derekerkench) is a village in the Shamakhi District of Azerbaijan. The village had an Armenian population before the exodus of Armenians from Azerbaijan after the outbreak of the Nagorno-Karabakh conflict.
