= Mərzəndiyə =

- Municipality
- Location within Azerbaijan
- Coordinates: 40°35′21″N 48°44′11″E
- Country: Azerbaijan
- Rayon: Shamakhi

Population
  - Total: 1,033
- Time zone: UTC+4 (AZT)
  - Summer (DST): UTC+5 (AZT)

Mərzəndiyə (also, Mirzəyandigah, Mirzəyəndigah, Marazandigyakh, Marzayandigyakh, and Merzengeli) is a village and municipality in the Shamakhi Rayon of Azerbaijan. It has a population of 1,033.
