= Dimitrovka =

Qurdtepe
- Location within Azerbaijan
- Coordinates: 40°40′30″N 48°33′04″E
- Country: Azerbaijan
- Rayon: Shamakhi
- Time zone: UTC+4 (AZT)
  - Summer (DST): UTC+5 (AZT)

Qurdtepe is a village in the Shamakhi Rayon of Azerbaijan.
