= Yenikənd, Shamakhi =

Yenikənd
- Location within Azerbaijan
- Coordinates: 40°31′N 48°39′E
- Country: Azerbaijan
- Rayon: Shamakhi
- Time zone: UTC+4 (AZT)
  - Summer (DST): UTC+5 (AZT)

Yenikənd (previously known as Kirovka or Korevka) is a village in the municipality of Göylər in the Shamakhi Rayon of Azerbaijan.
