= Dagkolany =

- Location within Azerbaijan
- Coordinates: 40°25′N 48°49′E
- Country: Azerbaijan
- Rayon: Shamakhi
- Time zone: UTC+4 (AZT)
  - Summer (DST): UTC+5 (AZT)

Dagkolany is a village in the Shamakhi Rayon of Azerbaijan.
