= Göylər =

Village and municipality in Azerbaijan

Coordinates: 40.4897°N 48.6847°E

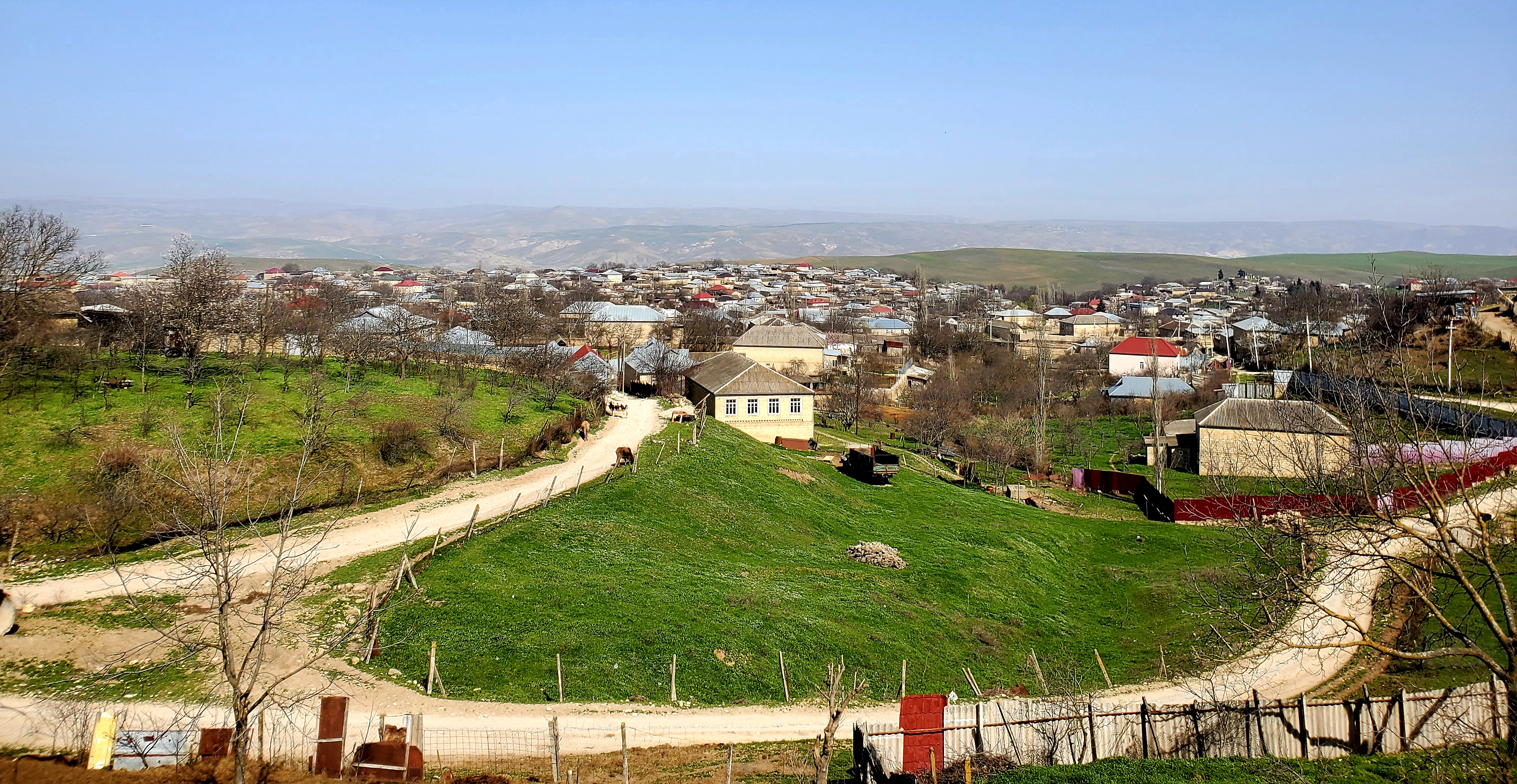

Göylər is a village and the most populous municipality, except for the capital Şamaxı, in the Shamakhi Rayon of Azerbaijan. It has a population of 6,844. The municipality consists of the villages of Göylər Dağ, Göylər Çöl, Acıdərə, and Yenikənd.
