= Dədəgünəş =

- Municipality
- Location within Azerbaijan
- Coordinates: 40°42′51″N 48°34′23″E
- Country: Azerbaijan
- Rayon: Shamakhi

Population
  - Total: 194
- Time zone: UTC+4 (AZT)
  - Summer (DST): UTC+5 (AZT)

Dədəgünəş (also, Dedagyunash and Dedegyunesh) is a village and municipality in the Shamakhi Rayon of Azerbaijan. It has a population of 194.
