= Dağ Bağırlı =

Village and municipality in Shamakhi Rayon, Azerbaijan

Coordinates: 40°30′N 48°40′E

Dağ Bağırlı is a village and municipality in the Shamakhi Rayon of Azerbaijan. It has a population of 1,258.
