= Mirikənd =

- Municipality
- Location within Azerbaijan
- Coordinates: 40°38′09″N 48°33′05″E
- Country: Azerbaijan
- Rayon: Shamakhi

Population
  - Total: 1,277
- Time zone: UTC+4 (AZT)
  - Summer (DST): UTC+5 (AZT)

Mirikənd (also, Merikend and Mirikend) is a village and municipality in the Shamakhi Rayon of Azerbaijan. It has a population of 1,277. The municipality consists of the villages of Mirikənd and Məlcək.
