= Abdally =

Abdally may refer to:

- Abdallı, Azerbaijan
- Abdal, Azerbaijan
