= Şərədil =

- Municipality
- Location within Azerbaijan
- Coordinates: 40°37′24″N 48°28′38″E
- Country: Azerbaijan
- Rayon: Shamakhi

Population
  - Total: 581
- Time zone: UTC+4 (AZT)
  - Summer (DST): UTC+5 (AZT)

Şərədil (also, Sharadil’ and Sheradil’) is a village and municipality in the Shamakhi Rayon of Azerbaijan. It has a population of 581.
