= Sachyarni =

- Location within Azerbaijan
- Coordinates: 40°54′N 48°39′E
- Country: Azerbaijan
- Rayon: Shamakhi
- Time zone: UTC+4 (AZT)
  - Summer (DST): UTC+5 (AZT)

Sachyarni is a village in the Shamakhi Rayon of Azerbaijan.
