= Qurdtəpə =

- Municipality
- Location within Azerbaijan
- Coordinates: 40°40′43″N 48°33′24″E
- Country: Azerbaijan
- Rayon: Shamakhi

Population
  - Total: 804
- Time zone: UTC+4 (AZT)
  - Summer (DST): UTC+5 (AZT)

Qurdtəpə (formerly Novodmitriyevka) is a village and municipality in the Shamakhi Rayon of Azerbaijan. It has a population of 804.
