= Ərçiman =

- Municipality
- Location within Azerbaijan
- Coordinates: 40°49′21″N 48°37′10″E
- Country: Azerbaijan
- Rayon: Shamakhi

Population
  - Total: 587
- Time zone: UTC+4 (AZT)
  - Summer (DST): UTC+5 (AZT)

Ərçiman (also, Archiman) is a village and municipality in the Shamakhi Rayon of Azerbaijan. It has a population of 587.
