= Pirbəyli =

- Municipality
- Location within Azerbaijan
- Coordinates: 40°50′17″N 48°44′36″E
- Country: Azerbaijan
- Rayon: Shamakhi

Population
  - Total: 184
- Time zone: UTC+4 (AZT)
  - Summer (DST): UTC+5 (AZT)

Pirbəyli (also, Pirbeyli) is a village and the least populous municipality in the Shamakhi Rayon of Azerbaijan. It has a population of 184.
