= Bash-Khynysly =

- Location within Azerbaijan
- Coordinates: 40°39′17″N 48°36′29″E
- Country: Azerbaijan
- Rayon: Shamakhi
- Time zone: UTC+4 (AZT)
  - Summer (DST): UTC+5 (AZT)

Bash-Khynysly (also, Bash-Khanysly and Bash-Khanysty) is a village in the Shamakhi Rayon of Azerbaijan.
