= Məlikçobanlı, Shamakhi =

Məlikçobanlı
- Municipality
- Location within Azerbaijan
- Coordinates: 40°32′31″N 48°41′14″E
- Country: Azerbaijan
- Rayon: Shamakhi

Population
  - Total: 1,887
- Time zone: UTC+4 (AZT)
  - Summer (DST): UTC+5 (AZT)

Məlikçobanlı (also, Melikchobanly and Melik-Chobany) is a village and municipality in the Shamakhi Rayon of Azerbaijan. It has a population of 1,887.
