= Çarxan =

- Municipality
- Location within Azerbaijan
- Coordinates: 40°33′14″N 48°38′58″E
- Country: Azerbaijan
- Rayon: Shamakhi

Population
  - Total: 2,600
- Time zone: UTC+4 (AZT)
  - Summer (DST): UTC+5 (AZT)

Çarxan (also, Çarhan, Chargan, and Charkhan) is a village and municipality in the Shamakhi Rayon of Azerbaijan. It has a population of 2,600.
