= Khaqani =

12th-century Persian poet and author

- خاقانی
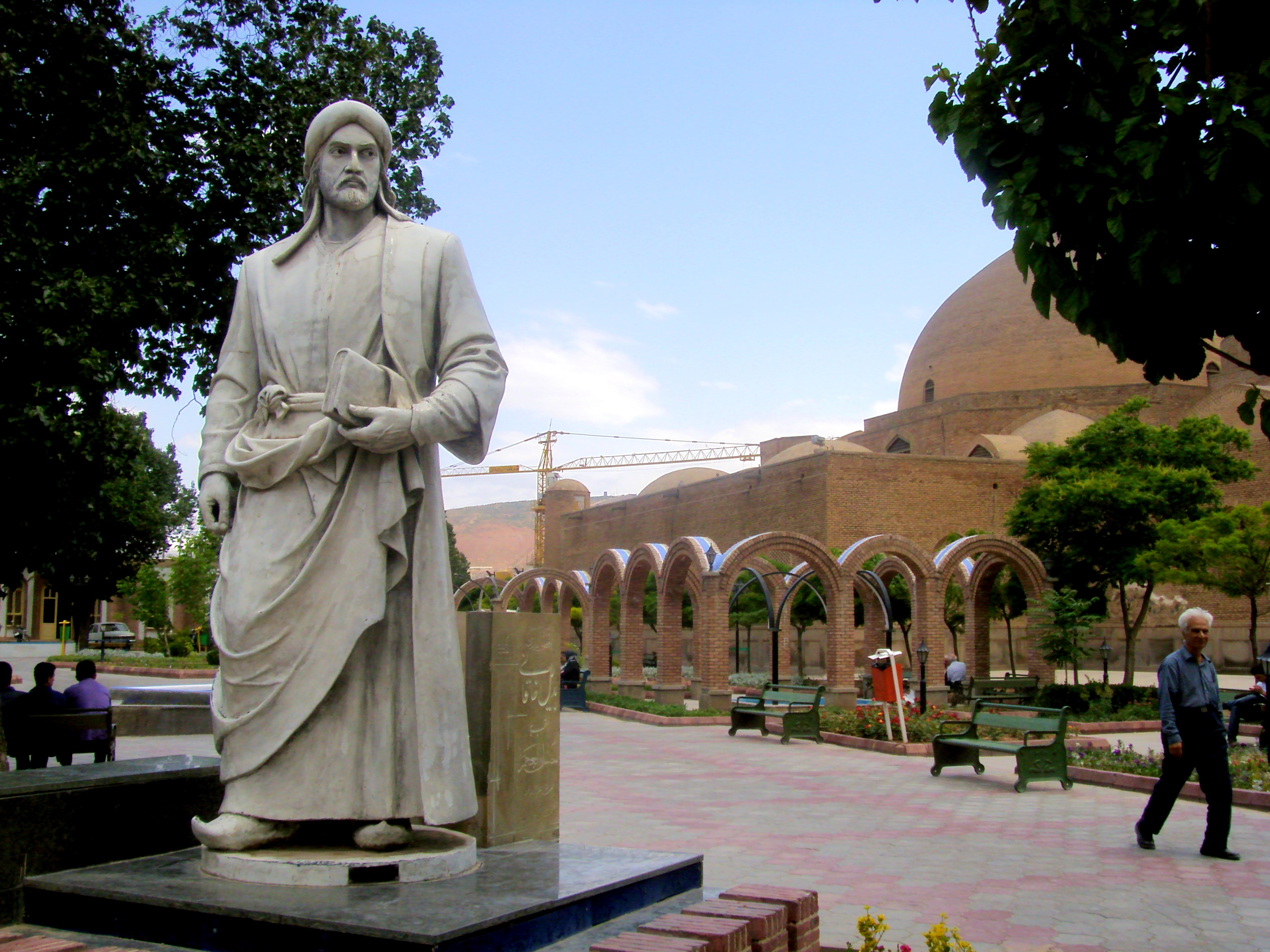
- Khaqani statue in Khaqani Park, Tabriz, Iran
- Born: Between 1120 and 1127; Shirvan, Shirvanshahs
- Died: Between 1186-87 and 1199; Tabriz, Eldiguzids
- Writing career
- Genre: Habsiyāt (prison poetry) Qaṣāid Ghazals Rubā'iyāt Mathnavi
- Notable works: Divān, Tohfat al-ʿErāqayn

Afzal al-Dīn Badīl ibn ʿAlī ibn ʿOthmān (Persian: افضل‌الدّین بدیل بن علی بن عثمان), commonly known as Khāqānī (Persian: خاقانی, c. 1120 (Note: Using the decipherment of the poet's chronogram and corroborating references in his Divān, scholars have proposed 514–15/1120–1121, circa 519/1125, and 1127 as the most probable dates for his birth.) – c. 1199), was a major Persian (Note: He is invariably described as a Persian by all scholarly sources used herein.) poet and prose-writer. He was born in Shirvanshahs, a vassal of the Seljuks in the region of Shirvan, where he served as an ode-writer to the Shirvanshahs. His fame most securely rests upon the qasidas collected in his Divān, and his autobiographical travelogue Tohfat al-ʿErāqayn. He is also notable for his contributions to the genre of habsiyāt ("prison poetry").

== Life ==
Khaqani was born into the family of a carpenter in Shirvan, on the border of the Persianate world. His mother was originally a slave-girl of Nestorian Christian faith who had converted to Islam. According to Khaqani, she was a descendant of "the great Philippus", which some scholars such as Minorsky (1945) have interpreted as meaning Marcus Julius Philippus, the third-century Roman emperor. Khaqani lost his father at an early age and was brought up by his uncle, Kāfi-al-Din ʿOmar, a physician. Later in life, Khaqani wrote a poem in his praise, in which he used the similarity of his uncle's name and that of Omar Khayyam to compare their virtues.

Khaqani may have been a child prodigy, since several of his poems can be dated to his early youth, indicating that he had become the eulogist of Manuchihr III at an early age. In his early youth, Khaqani wrote under the pen name Haqaiʿqi ("Seeker"). The Shirvanshahs bore the title Khaqan, from which he later derived the pen name, Khaqani ("regal"). Some traditional stories describe him as being the pupil and son-in-law of the famed poet Abu'l-Ala Ganjavi, however, this is not corroborated by Khaqani's own writings.

Khaqani in his youth decided to embark on a pilgrimage to Mecca, against the wishes of his ruler and patron. In his first attempt to depart Shirvan, he was captured by Manuchihr's henchmen in the nearby Beylagan. Charged with being insubordinate, he was imprisoned for a period of 5 or 7 months in an ancient fortress in Shabaran, near Darband. Khaqani was condemned to a number of subsequent imprisonments, until in 1156-7 he succeeded in escaping and setting out on a lengthy expedition through the Middle East. His travels gave him material for his famous work Tohfat al-ʿErāqayn (A Gift from the Two Iraqs; in reference to western Iran ('Persian Iraq') and Mesopotamia ('Arabic Iraq'). He also composed his famous qasida The Portals at Madāʾen, in which the contemplation of Taq-i Kisra (the ruins of the Sassanid Palace near Ctesiphon), according to Beelaert (2010) "elicits a warning about the transience of royal courts."

Upon his return, Khaqani was immediately detained by Manuchihr's successor Akhsitan I. To memorialize his incarceration in verse, Khaqani composed his most powerful anti-feudal poems in a genre that will later become known as habsiyāt (prison poetry). In total, five of his poems describe his ordeal in prison. One of the poems, widely known as the "Christian" qasida, is considered by Gould (2016) to be "one of his boldest acts of literary rebellion". Minorsky (1945) identified Andronicus Comnenus as the patron to whom Khaqani addressed this poem.

Between 1173–1175, Khaqani composed odes in honor of the Shirvan victory over the Russians, in which he reports the locations and details of the operations, including the destruction of 73 Russian ships. His personal life at this time was filled with tragedy. He suffered several family bereavements, including the death of his first wife, and his young son, Rashid-al-Din. Khaqani composed elegies lamenting their deaths. About the same time, Khaqani went on a second pilgrimage, after which he retired from court life to settle at Tabriz. According to accounts of him in various biographical works on poets, the date of his death ranges from 1186 to 1199. According to the gravestone in Tabriz, Khaqani died in Shawwal 595, corresponding to July 1199.

== Work and legacy ==
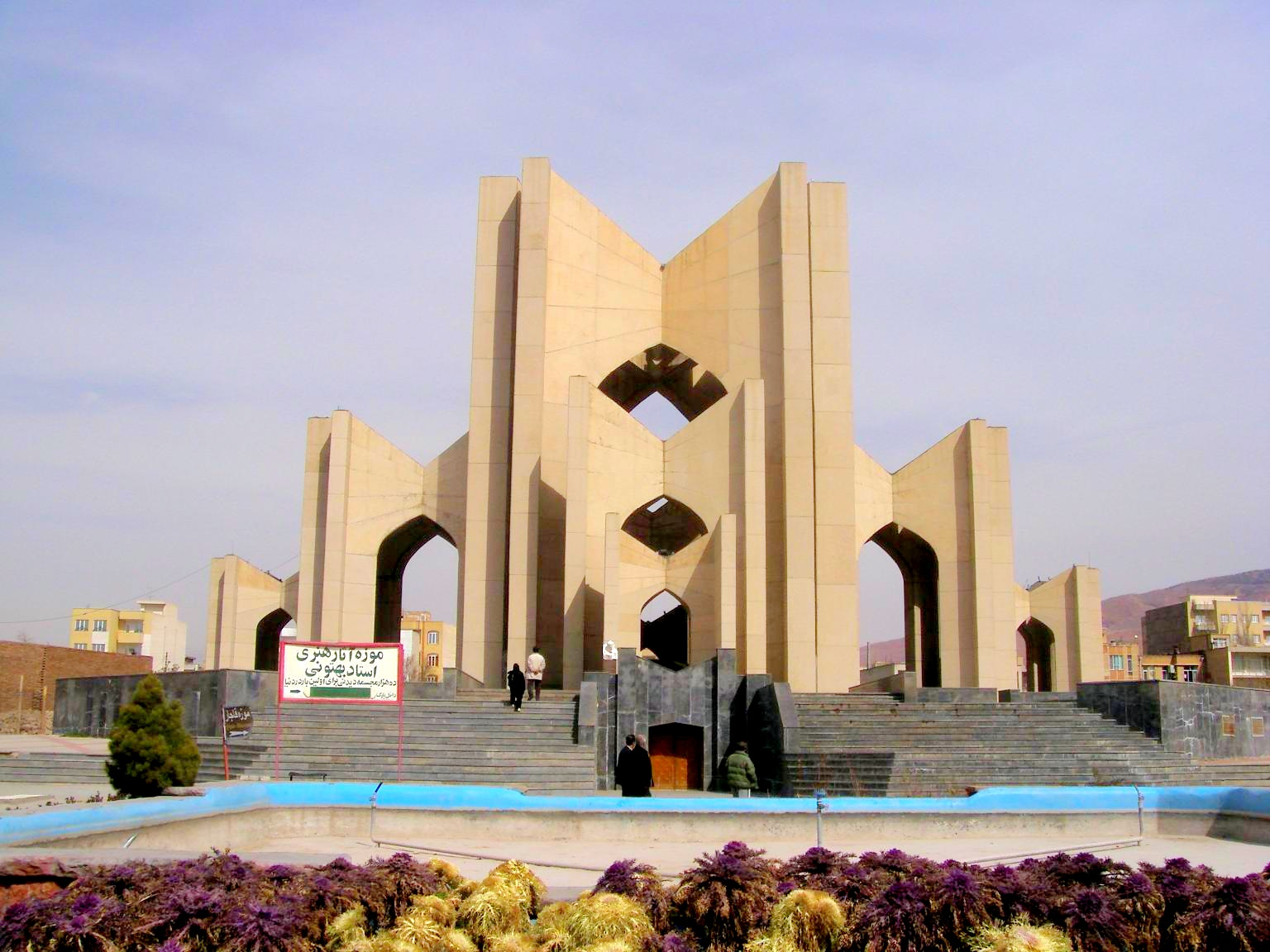
Mausoleum of Poets, the graveyard of many classical and contemporary Persian poets including Khaqani.

Khaqani's Divān contains qasidas (both panegyrics and non-panegyric odes), tarjiʿāt (strophic poems), ghazals (profane love poems), and rubaʿis (quatrains). His other famous work, Tohfat al-ʿErāqayn, originally titled Khatm al-gharāʾeb ("Curious Rarities"), is written in couplet form (mathnawi) and is over three thousand verses long. This book serves as an autobiography and also presents his impressions of the Middle East. Beelaert notes that, although the work is a mathnawi, it exhibits more affinities with his other qasidas. His surviving prose works include the prose introduction to the aforementioned mathnawi, and approximately sixty letters attributed to him.

Khaqani lived within a partly Christian milieu, and according to Beelaert, he was "a product of the culturally complex milieu of the Caucasus." He established friendly contact with Byzantine, Armenian and Georgian royalty. His poetry is sometimes profused with Christian imagery and symbols, and according to Lewis (2009), he "imbues his Christian images with a positive aura and an insider's knowledge of Christianity."

It is often believed that Khaqani's complex mode of expression has often been an obstacle to a full appreciation of his poetical value. Much of his poetry is considered to be abstruse, exhibiting a vast range of vocabulary and an abundance of play-on-words. According to Minorsky the poems "bristle with rare words, unusual similes and allusions to astrology, medicine, theology, history, to say nothing of the numerous hints concerning happenings of the poet's own life and time". Ali Dashti referred to him as "the inaccessible poet" and contrasted the difficulty of Khaqani's poems to the simplicity of Saadi's poetry.

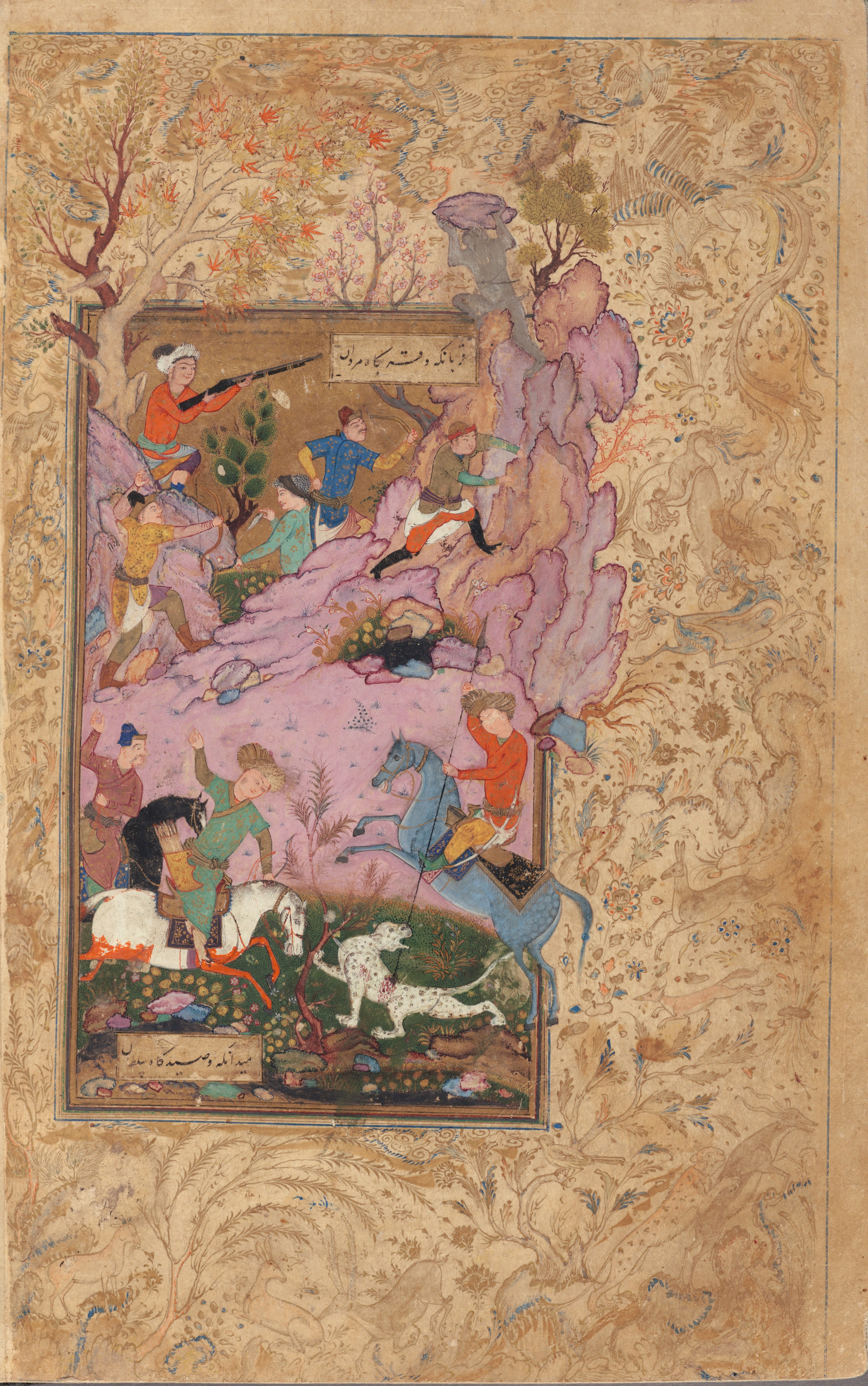
Illuminated leaf from Tohfat al-ʿErāqayn, Houghton Library MS Typ 536

Khaqani is widely considered to be a major Persian language poet. (Note: He is, for example, referred to as a "major" poet by Beelaert and Vil'Čevskij, and "one of the greatest Persian poets" by Minorsky, and Rypka considers him one of the great masters of the Persian tongue.) His habsiyāt ("prison poetry") is considered one of the finest of its kind. The genre has been described as the "medieval Islamic world's most aesthetically compelling corpus of texts dealing with incarceration." The naʿtiyas (poetry in praise of Muhammad) procured him the title Hassānu'l-ʿAjam ("The Persian Hassān"), Hassan ibn Thabit being a famous Arabic poet who composed panegyrics in praise of Muhammad. It is believed that the work of figures such as Omar Khayyam, al-Maʿarri, Unsuri, Masud Sa'd Salman, and Sanai were parts of Khaqani's literary background. In turn, his work influenced such men as Nezami Ganjavi, Jami, and likely Saadi and Hafez. According to Jan Rypka: "A Master of the language, a poet possessing both intellect and heart, who fled from the outer world to the inner world, a personality who did not conform to type — all this places him in the front ranks of Persian literature".

Khaqani might be considered the leading figure in the Shirvanshahs' effort to claim the heritage of Iran's ancient monarchy, and addressed the Shirvanshahs, particularly Akhsitan I, as "the most just of the descendants of Bahram, Iran's [Khosrow] Parviz, Akhsetan" and his queen, who is addressed as "the lady of the House of Jamshid". He portrayed Shirvan as both the heir of the Sasanian Empire and of the Iranian monarchy’s tradition in the Samanid Empire (819–999) of Khorasan and Transoxiana;

"Sharvan has become the new Mada'en; if you look at the royal session

You can find the Khosrow of the age, you can see the new Eyvan! May he enjoy perfection in power, so that every moment at its perfection

You see the new order in the kingdom of the House of Saman."
