= Göylərdağ =

- Location within Azerbaijan
- Coordinates: 40°29′42″N 48°40′44″E
- Country: Azerbaijan
- Rayon: Shamakhi
- Municipality: Göylər

Population
  - Total: 6,462
- Time zone: UTC+4 (AZT)
  - Summer (DST): UTC+5 (AZT)

Göylərdağ (also, Göylər Dağ, Geoglyar, Geoglyar-Dag, and Gëylyar Dag) is a village in the Shamakhi Rayon of Azerbaijan. The village forms part of the municipality of Göylər.
