= Shikla =

A shikla or shakila (Arabic: شكيلة), also known under the name alama (علامة) is a piece of clothing that the Jews of Tunisia were forced to wear to distinguish themselves from Muslim residents. The shikla was primarily worn, with some interruptions, between the 9th and 19th century in Tunisia and at times also in the rest of the Maghreb.

== Etymology ==
The word comes from the Jewish surname Bou Shikla, which signifies "one who wears a ring".

== History ==
=== 9th to 12th century ===
From the ninth century onwards, Islamic authorities begun to harden with respect to ghiyār, or the differentiating of non-Muslims from Muslims. As such, al-Mutawakkil ordered that dhimmis (Christians and Jews) wear additionally to the already existing zunnar a honey-coloured outer garment and batch-like patches on their servants' clothing. Thus begun the tradition to differentiate dhimmis by colour.

This approach was also followed in the Maghreb where the semi-independent Aghlabids introduced similar rules around the same time. Ibrahim ibn Ahmad is reported to have ordered in the summer of 888 Christians to wear a patch depicting a pig and Jews one depicting a monkey, symbols they were also supposed to put on the walls of their houses. Ahmad ibn Talib, the Maliki qadi of Kairouan, issued an order for dhimmis to wear additionally to the zunnar a patch (ruq'a) of white cloth on the shoulder of their outer garments, again with the patch for Jews being a monkey and for Christians a pig. According to Muhammad al-Uqbani, those who disobeyed were to be punished with twenty lashes of the whip before being thrown into prison whereas those who disobeyed a second time were to be beaten brutally and thrown into prison indefinitely. It is not clear how long Ibn Talib's humiliating decree remained in force, but it is clear that in the Maghrebi case, the purpose of the patch was not merely ghiyār, but also dhull (humiliation) in keeping with the koranic injunction (Sura 9:29) that non-Muslims should be humbled.

With the arrival of the Banu Hilal to Kairouan in the 12th century, the Jewish community in the area began to face discrimination and intolerance from their new rulers. While Jews and Christians benefited from increased rights under the Fatimids, the same rights were not provided under the Banu Hilal. The new rulers argued that while the hadith in which the prophet Muhammad allowed freedom of religion for People of the Book (ahl al-kitâb); the rule was only in place for a period of 500 years after the Hijrah, which coincided with the year 1107, the date when the Jews of Medina told Muhammad that the Messiah would arrive. The date had long since passed when the Almohad Caliphate settled in Ifriqiya, allowing the new rulers to say there was no longer a reason to keep those privileges for dhimmis.

=== 13th to 19th century ===
Among the numerous obligations that Jews suffered was the obligation of wearing a Shikla, on the order of Abu Yusuf Yaqub al-Mansur in 1198, to be able to distinguish them from Muslim citizens and forbid them from certain places, occupations and events. Even Jews who converted to Islam were forced to wear the distinctive headpiece as al-Mansur doubted the sincerity of their conversion. Following the Almohad example, the Hafsid caliph al-Mustansir enforced the laws of the ghiyār (differentiation of non-Muslims) and Jews wore again the shikla, though it is not entirely clear how it looked at the time; it may be that the shikla was both a special patch and an overall attire unique to Jews. Muhammad al-Uqbani, a qadi in Tlemcen around 1450, reported that native Jewish men in the Maghreb wore a distinguishing piece of yellow fabric (shikla) over their outer clothing so that their identity was clear, whereas Jews who had migrated to the Maghreb distinguished themselves by means of a skull-cap topped with a tassel. The Flemish traveller Anselm Adornes reported the same, mentioning that the Jews of Tunis wore a piece of yellow cloth on their head and neck, without which they would be stoned.

The Jews continued to wear the Shikla in Tunisia until the creation of the Pacte fondamental (which removed dhimmi status) following the decree of Mohammed Bey on 14 September 1858. The pact not only abolished the clothing but allowed Jews to wear the Red Chéchia headpiece like the rest of Tunisians. Ibn Abi Dhiaf wrote about the decision:

Prescribing specific attire for the people of the "dhimma" has nothing to do with the foundations of religion. The Prophet never changed the dress of the Jews of Medina.

La prescription d'une tenue spécifique pour les gens de la dhimma n'a rien à voir avec les fondements de la religion. Le prophète n'a jamais changé la tenue des Juifs de Médine.

== Description ==
The requirements for the shikla varied with the different dynasties that ruled over Tunisia. The main goal was simply to distinguish and humiliate Jews in public spaces.

Under the reign of the Almohad Caliphate, it was principally a turban dyed yellow at the end. Jewish converts to Islam were forced to wear a long dark blue tunic with sleeves so large they reached one's feet, and a skullcap in place of a turban. During the mid-fifteenth century the shikla consisted of a piece of yellow fabric.

During the Ottoman rule of Tunisia, the Twansa Jewish community put on black bonnets while the Granas preferred more European headgear to avoid being confused with the indigenous Twansa.

== See also ==
- Yellow badge
- Zunnar
