= Göylər Çöl =

- Location within Azerbaijan
- Coordinates: 40°25′37″N 48°36′45″E
- Country: Azerbaijan
- Rayon: Shamakhi
- Municipality: Göylər
- Time zone: UTC+4 (AZT)
  - Summer (DST): UTC+5 (AZT)

Göylər Çöl (also, Geoglyar, Geoglyar, Kishlak, Geoglyar-Chol’, and Gëylyar Chël’) is a village in the Shamakhi Rayon of Azerbaijan. The village forms part of the municipality of Göylər.
