= Adnalı, Shamakhi =

Adnalı
- Municipality
- Location within Azerbaijan
- Coordinates: 40°34′25″N 48°37′24″E
- Country: Azerbaijan
- Rayon: Shamakhi

Population
  - Total: 937
- Time zone: UTC+4 (AZT)
  - Summer (DST): UTC+5 (AZT)

Adnalı (also, Adnaly) is a village and municipality in the Shamakhi Rayon of Azerbaijan. It has a population of 937.
