= Govurqala, Oguz =

Azerbaijani archeological site

Govurqala is a name shared by four archaeological sites in Azerbaijan, located in Oguz.

This Govurqala lies to the north from Khachmaz village and is a medieval walled stand with round and square towers (3–6 m in height, 1–1.5 m wide). Twelve buildings are within the stand; out of walls there are two moats (15 m long, 8 m wide, 10 m deep, another is 100/30/20 m). During the 1965 excavations, some other evidences were found.
