= Koroglu Rahimov =

Azerbaijani National Hero

- Born: October 31, 1953; Xaçmaz, Oghuz, Azerbaijan
- Died: July 3, 1992 (aged 38); Aghdara district, Azerbaijan
- Military career
- Allegiance: Republic of Azerbaijan
- Rank: Lieutenant
- Conflicts: First Nagorno-Karabakh War
- Awards: National Hero of Azerbaijan; 1994

Koroglu Rahimov (Azerbaijani: Koroğlu İsmayıl oğlu Rəhimov) (October 31, 1953, Xaçmaz, Oghuz, Azerbaijan – July 3, 1992, Aghdara, Azerbaijan) was the National Hero of Azerbaijan, the warrior of the First Nagorno-Karabakh War and the Division Commander of the 2nd military division of the military unit "N".

== Military activities ==
Koroglu Rahimov joined as a volunteer to the National Army on 17 March 1992. He was the commander of the 2nd military division of the military unit "N". He died in the battles for Aghdara district of Karabakh in 1992. Two years after his death, on September 16, 1994, by the decree of Heydar Aliyev, he was posthumously awarded the title of "National Hero of Azerbaijan." He was buried in the Alley of Martyrs in Baku.

== Biography ==
Koroglu Rahimov was born on October 31, 1953, in Khachmaz village of Oguz region, Azerbaijan. In 1960, he went to Yagublu village secondary school for 7 years.

== Awards ==
According to the decree of the President of the Republic of Azerbaijan Heydar Aliyev dated September 16, 1994, Koroglu Rahimov was posthumously awarded the title of “National Hero of Azerbaijan”.

== Sources ==
- Əsgərov Vüqar İsrafil oğlu (2005). "Azərbaycanın Milli Qəhrəmanları". Bakı: Poliqraf. pp. 251 səh.
