= Külüllü, Agsu =

Külüllü
- Location within Azerbaijan
- Coordinates: 40°36′22″N 48°09′52″E
- Country: Azerbaijan
- Rayon: Agsu
- Municipality: Padar
- Time zone: UTC+4 (AZT)
  - Summer (DST): UTC+5 (AZT)

Külüllü (also, Gülüllü, Kululu, and Kyulyulyu) is a village in the Agsu Rayon of Azerbaijan. The village forms part of the municipality of Padar.
