= Borbor =

- Location within Azerbaijan
- Coordinates: 41°19′N 48°54′E
- Country: Azerbaijan
- Rayon: Davachi
- Municipality: Padar
- Time zone: UTC+4 (AZT)
  - Summer (DST): UTC+5 (AZT)

Borbor (also, Bor-bor and Bur-Bur) is a village in the Davachi Rayon of Azerbaijan. The village forms part of the municipality of Rahimli.
