= Ritinis =

Traditional Lithuanian team sport

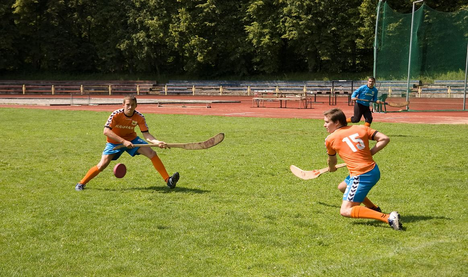
Ritinis competition in Vilnius, Lithuania.

Ritinis pictogram.

Ritinis (also ritinys, rypka, rifle, katilka) is a team sport originating in Lithuania. It is included in the World Lithuanian Games. Ritinis was also represented in the TAFISA World Games.

== Gameplay ==
Ritinis is often played on a football field. Games last 40 minutes with a half-time interval after 20 minutes.

Two teams of seven players each (six strikers and one goal keeper) compete to throw the Rypka, a hard rubber discus, either behind their opponents' back line for 1 point, or in their opponents' goal for 3 points. Players can only throw the discus with their hands, while they can only block the discus with their bats, which are curved and are called Ritmuša.

It is common for teams to have five reserve players on hand.

=== Equipment ===
- Rypka - a hard rubber discus or "ball" (600-700 grams)
- Ritmuša - a curved bat used to stop the discus (<150 centimetres).

=== Scoring ===
- 1 point: for throwing the rypka behind their opponents' back line
- 3 points: for throwing the rypka into their opponents' goal

== History ==
Ritinis originated from the Lithuanian ethnic game that was played on an open field. It was known since at least the 17th century. The first rule book of stadium ritinis game was written by Karolis Dineika in Vilniaus rypka (the rypka of Vilnius) in 1923.

In 1958 the Lithuanian Ethnic Games Federation was created and included ritinis. In 1973 a separate Lithuanian Ritinis Federation was established. The first Lithuanian National Championships were held in 1961.
