= Abdallı =

- Location within Azerbaijan Location within Shaki-Zagatala Economic Region
- Coordinates: 41°04′33″N 47°35′40″E
- Country: Azerbaijan
- Rayon: Oghuz
- Municipality: Xaçmaz
- Time zone: UTC+4 (AZT)
  - Summer (DST): UTC+5 (AZT)

Abdallı (also, Abdally and Avdally) is a village in the Oghuz Rayon of Azerbaijan. The village forms part of the municipality of Xaçmaz.
