= Adnalı, Jalilabad =

Adnalı
- Municipality
- Location within Azerbaijan
- Coordinates: 39°17′27″N 48°24′22″E
- Country: Azerbaijan
- Rayon: Jalilabad

Population
  - Total: 1,930
- Time zone: UTC+4 (AZT)

Adnalı (also, Adnaly and Adynaly) is a village and municipality in the Jalilabad Rayon of Azerbaijan. It has a population of 1,930.
