= Hacıəlibəy =

Hajialibey
- Municipality
- Azerbaijani: Hacıəlibəy
- Location within Azerbaijan
- Coordinates: 41°24′15″N 48°42′14″E
- Country: Azerbaijan
- District: Khachmaz

Population
  - Total: 2,230
- Time zone: UTC+4 (AZT)
  - Summer (DST): UTC+5 (AZT)

Hacıəlibəy (also, Hajialibey and Mirzamammadgishlag) is a village and municipality in the Khachmaz District of Azerbaijan. It has a population of 2,230.
