= Padar, Rewa =

Village in Madhya Pradesh, India

Coordinates: 31°07′N 77°18′E

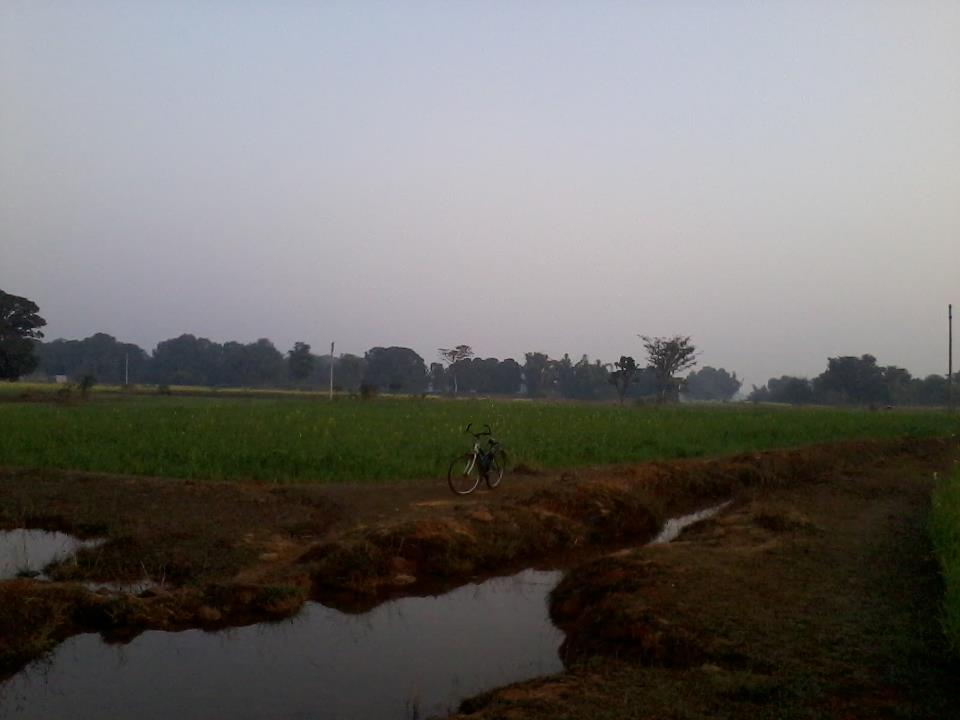
A short dam below Padar Dam

Padar is a village of Mauganj tehsil in the Mauganj district of Madhya Pradesh, India. It is situated near about 8 km south from Mauganj.

There is a big dam in Padar, south of Barahawatola and Nandanpur, which played an important role in irrigation of land of nearby villages i.e. Nandanpur, Padar, Kirtiya and many others villages. In padar Village there are many schools such Middle school barahavatola, High school Barahavatola, Kanya school padar....

Barahava tola has (padar) a river which name is kauya nadi.

In Barahava tola manigauga family is living since many year ago like 100 year ago...

== Gallery ==
Padar

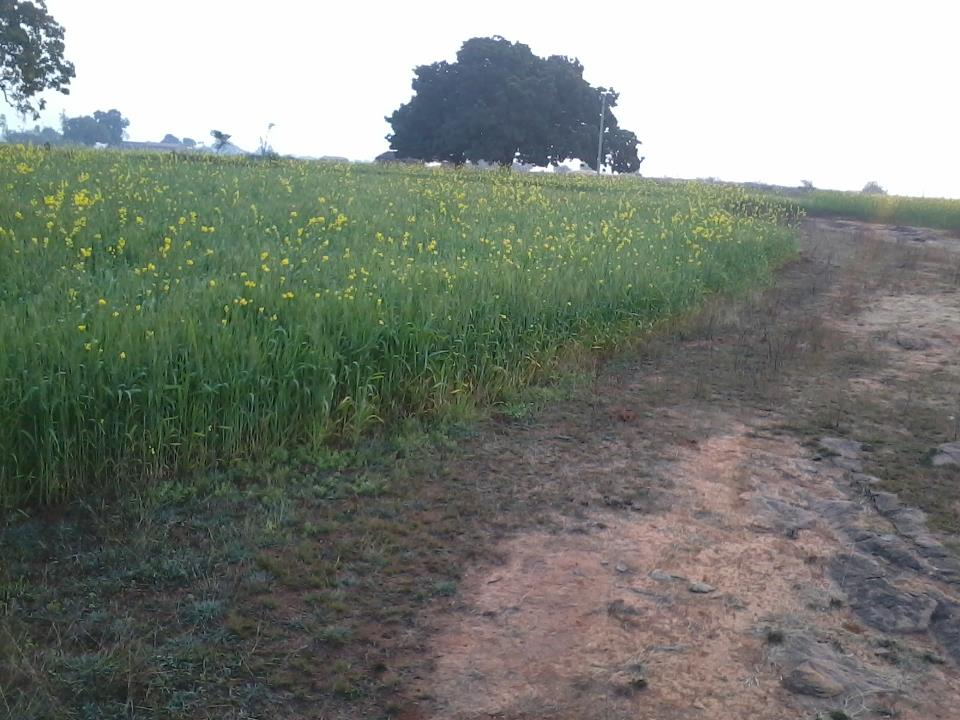
Agriculture

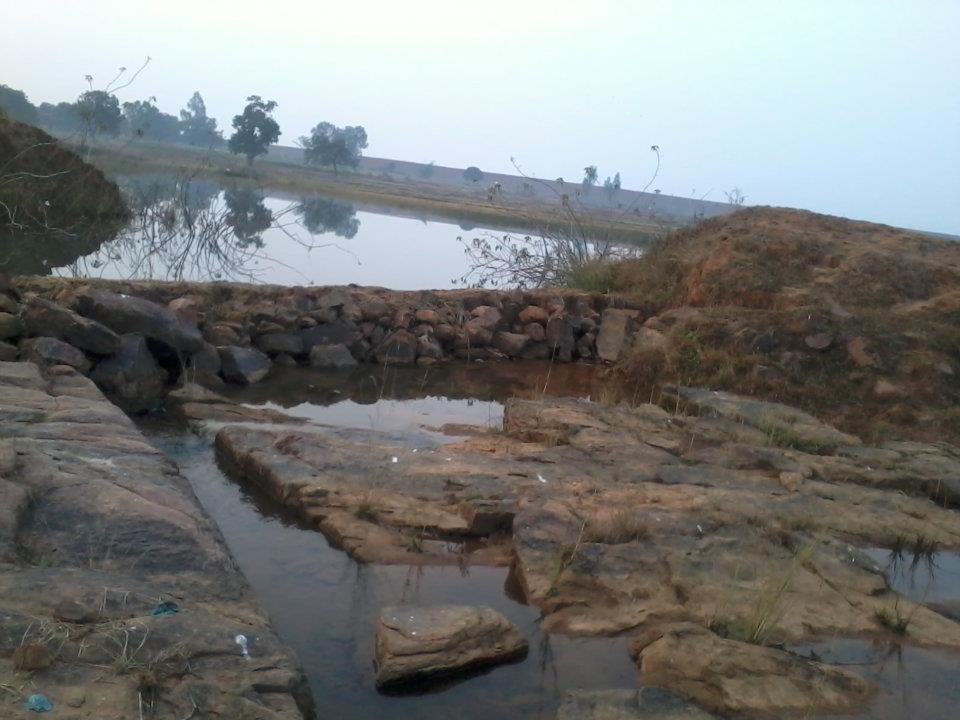
A short dam below Padar Dam

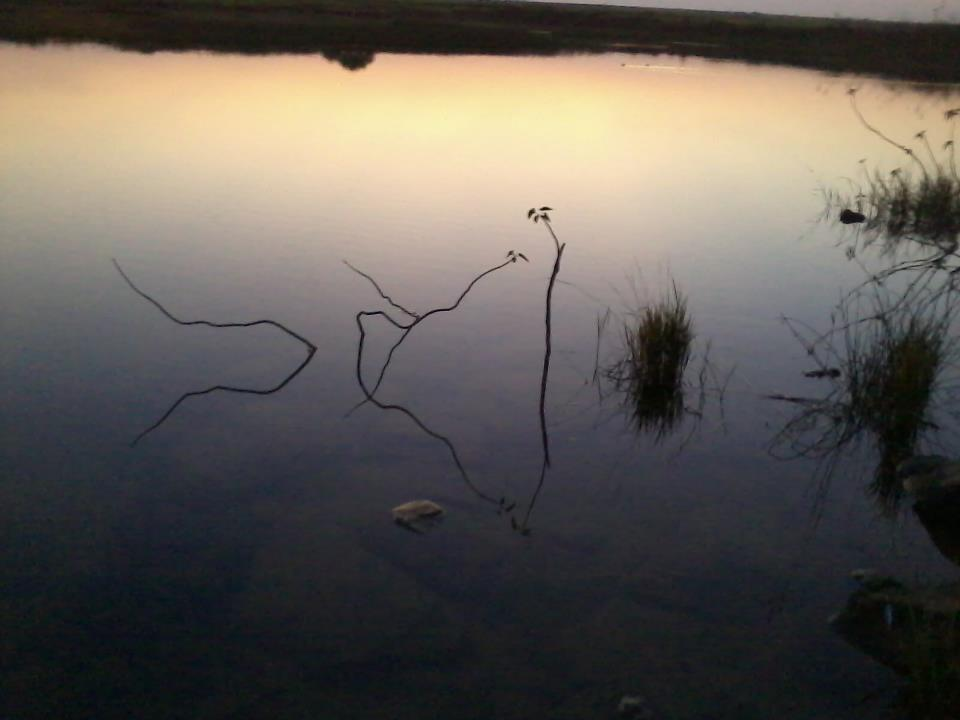
A short dam below Padar Dam
