= Davudoba =

Village in Azerbaijan

Coordinates: 41°26′N 48°37′E

Davudoba (also, Davidoba) is a village and municipality in the Quba Rayon of Azerbaijan. It has a population of over 700.
