= Padar, Shamakhi =

Padar
- Location within Azerbaijan
- Coordinates: 40°51′17″N 48°36′19″E
- Country: Azerbaijan
- Rayon: Shamakhi
- Time zone: UTC+4 (AZT)
  - Summer (DST): UTC+5 (AZT)

Padar is a village in the Shamakhi Rayon of Azerbaijan.
