= Sərkərli =

- Location within Azerbaijan
- Coordinates: 41°24′36″N 48°46′32″E
- Country: Azerbaijan
- Rayon: Khachmaz
- Municipality: Yergüc
- Time zone: UTC+4 (AZT)
  - Summer (DST): UTC+5 (AZT)

Sərkərli (also, Sərkarlı and Sərkəli, known as Borispol until 1992) is a village in the Khachmaz Rayon of Azerbaijan. It was founded in the nineteenth century as an Eastern Orthodox village of Borispol by migrants from what is now central Ukraine. The original population gradually left; the village was resettled by ethnic Azeris from neighbouring villages and renamed Sərkərli in 1992. The village forms part of the municipality of Yergüc. An archaeological site (now known as Sərkərtəpə) containing early-Bronze Age artifacts and an eighth-century burial site was discovered nearby.
