= Armudpadar =

- Municipality
- Location within Azerbaijan
- Coordinates: 41°26′44″N 48°46′10″E
- Country: Azerbaijan
- Rayon: Khachmaz

Population
  - Total: 1,838
- Time zone: UTC+4 (AZT)
  - Summer (DST): UTC+5 (AZT)

Armudpadar is a village and municipality in the Khachmaz Rayon of Azerbaijan. It has a population of 1,838. The municipality consists of the villages of Armudpadar and Padar.
