= Xaçmaz, Oghuz =

Xaçmaz
- Municipality
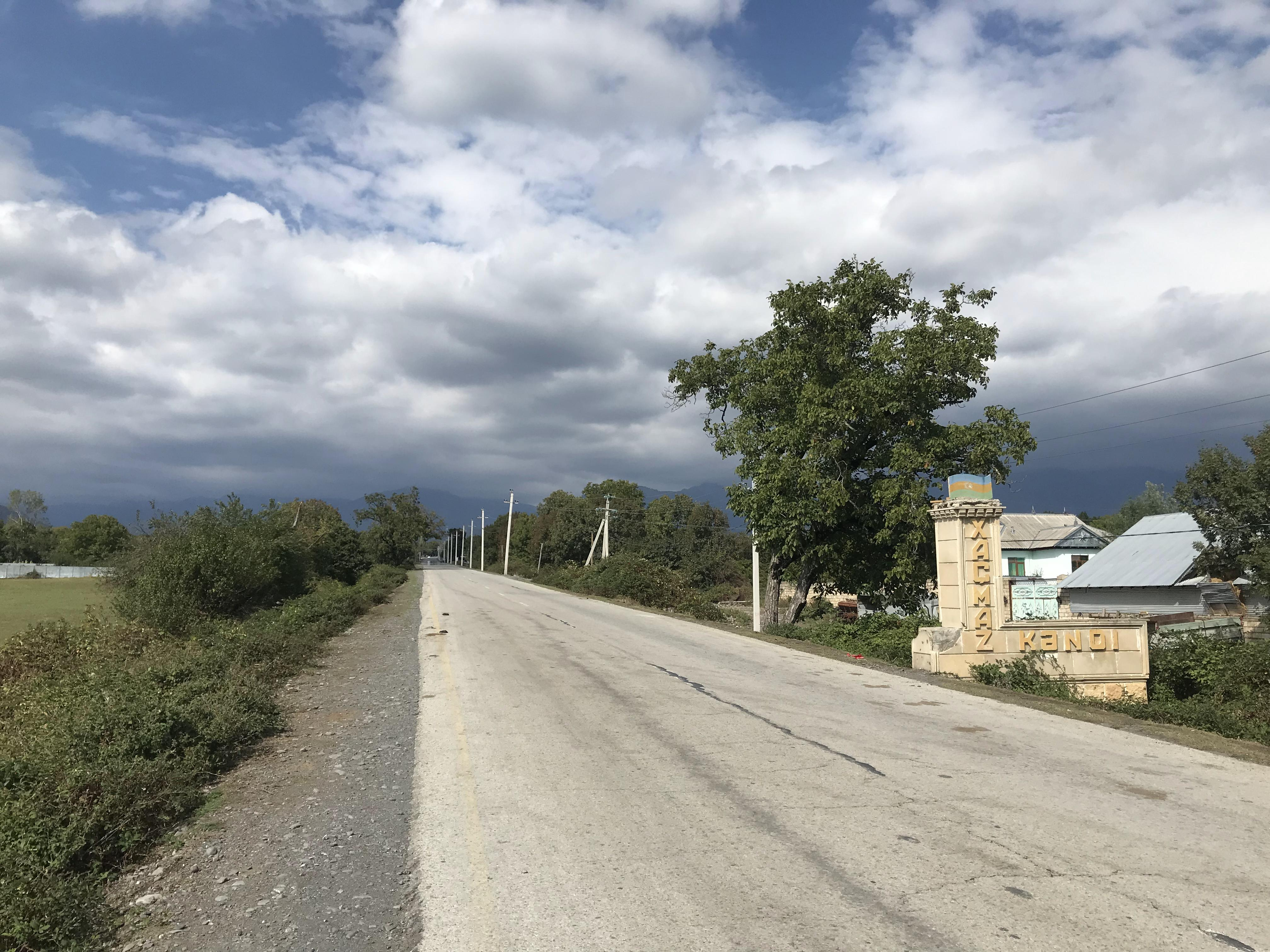

- Location within Azerbaijan
- Coordinates: 41°02′59″N 47°35′47″E
- Country: Azerbaijan
- District: Oghuz

Population
  - Total: 6,234
- Time zone: UTC+4 (AZT)
  - Summer (DST): UTC+5 (AZT)

Xaçmaz (also, Khachmaz and Khachmas) is a village and the most populous municipality, except for the capital Oghuz, in the Oghuz District of Azerbaijan. It has a population of 6,234. The municipality consists of the villages of Xaçmaz and Abdallı.

== Toponymy ==
Village located on the bank of the Galachay, on the slope of the Main Caucasus Range. It is first mentioned as a settlement and district in 7th century sources. The name "Khachmaz" is probably derived from the name of the "Khechmatek" tribe, which once lived in the area and became part of the militant Hunn tribe. This name was later transformed. Starting from the middle of the 7th century, it is found in the sources as "Khachmaz". To the north of the village, on the top of Galadagh, is the medieval Gavurgala.

== History ==
Khachmaz is the largest village in Oghuz District. The population (6234 people) is engaged in agriculture, animal husbandry, horticulture and vegetable growing. There are 2 secondary schools, 1 general secondary school, 3 kindergartens, a culture house, a club, 3 libraries, 1 post office, an 815-seat electronic automatic telephone exchange, a hospital and a pharmacy in the village. There is a wide network of trade, catering and household services in the village.

2 km north-west of Khachmaz village, Khachmaz Gavurgalasi (7th century) on the top of Galachay, Balashum settlement 5 km north-east (11th–12th centuries), 2 mosques in the village (19th century), 2 ancient bridges in the village - Adil and There are stone bridges. These monuments were also included in the list of archeological monuments of national and local significance by the government of the republic.

There are bus routes from the district center to Khachmaz village, and from Khachmaz village to Baku, Ganja, Mingachevir and Gabala.

== Historical monuments ==
- "Adil" Bridge (19th century).
- "Juma" Mosque (19th century).
- "Khachmaz" Mosque (19th century).
- "Haji Rashid" Bridge (19th century).
- "Balashum" – ancient settlement, 3-4 km from the village.
- "Gavurqala" Castle.

== Notable natives ==
- Koroglu Rahimov — National Hero of Azerbaijan.
- Nail Ibrahimli — Hero of the Patriotic War.
- Ravan Latifov — Second Karabakh War martyr - He was killed in the battles for Shusha. After his death, he was awarded the medals "For the Motherland", "Brave Warrior" and "For the Liberation of Shusha"
- Saleh Gaziyev — Azerbaijani archeologist, candidate of historical sciences. Saleh Mustafa oghlu Gaziyev was born in 1893 in Khachmaz village.
