= Taqi Kashi =

Taqī al-Dīn Muḥammad Kāshānī (Taqī Kāshī) (Persian: تقی کاشی: (b. 1549/1550–d. 1616) was a scholar who lived in the Safavid Empire during the sixteenth and seventeenth centuries. In 1577/78 or 1585, he authored Kholāṣat al-Ash‘ār wa Zubdat al-Afkār (“The Essence of Poems and the Quintessence of Thoughts”), a comprehensive biographical anthology of prominent Persian poets.

== Life ==
Mīr Taqī al-Dīn Muḥammad Kāshānī was one of the distinguished scholars and men of letters of the Safavid period. He was born in Kashan in 956 AH (1549/1550 CE) and was a disciple of the renowned poet and teacher Moḥtasham Kāshānī. In his literary works, he used the pen name “Zakrī”, under which he achieved recognition as a poet of considerable talent. In the literary and intellectual circles of his time, he was also known by the epithet “Mīr-e Tazkira” (“the author of a tazkira”), a title that reflects his authority and contribution to the genre of biographical anthologies. The most significant work of Mīr Taqī al-Dīn Kāshānī, which occupies a prominent place in the history of Safavid literature, is his Kholāṣat al-Ash‘ār wa Zubdat al-Afkār. This work is regarded as one of the most extensive and systematic examples of Persian biographical literature. The author is said to have devoted nearly forty years to its composition, completing it between 975 and 1016 AH (1567–1607 CE). According to available sources, Mīr Taqī al-Dīn Kāshānī died between 1022 and 1024 AH (1614–1616 CE). From a structural standpoint, Kholāṣat al-Ash‘ār wa Zubdat al-Afkār is a large and complex work. It consists of a preface, four main chapters (fasls), four pillars (rukns), an introductory section of the concluding part (Khātima), and twelve subsections (aṣls) incorporated within this conclusion. Each aṣl is devoted to a specific geographical region and contains biographical and literary information about poets from that region who were contemporaries of the author. This organizational feature makes the Kholāṣat al-Ash‘ār wa Zubdat al-Afkār not merely a chronological and biographical collection of poets but also a valuable source that reflects the literary geography of its time. The fifth aṣl of the Khātima is particularly noteworthy, as it provides extensive biographical accounts of poets associated with the city of Qazvin — the Dar al-Saltana (royal capital) and a key political and literary center of the Safavid period. This section is of great importance both for the study of Qazvin’s literary milieu and for the broader investigation of Safavid poetry. In modern scholarship, several critical editions of different parts of Kāshānī’s work have been published. Notably, the section titled Kholāṣat al-Ash‘ār wa Zubdat al-Afkār (Bakhsh-e Khurāsān) was edited and published in Tehran in 1393 AH solar (2014 CE) by the Miras-e Maktub Research Center, contributing significantly to the contemporary study of Safavid literary historiography.

== Sources ==
- de Blois, F.C. (2000). "Taḳī al-Dīn". In Bearman, P. J.; Bianquis, Th.; Bosworth, C. E.; van Donzel, E. & Heinrichs, W. P. (eds.). The Encyclopaedia of Islam, Second Edition. Volume X: T–U. Leiden: E. J. Brill. ISBN 978-90-04-11211-7.
- Sharma, Sunil (2021). "Local and Transregional Places in the Works of Safavid Men of Letterse". In Melville, Charles (ed.). Safavid Persia in the Age of Empires, the Idea of Iran Vol. 10. Bloomsbury Publishing. pp. 309–330. ISBN 978-0755633777.
