= Padar, Hajigabul =

Village in the Hajigabul District of Azerbaijan

Padar is a village and municipality in the Hajigabul Rayon of Azerbaijan. It has a population of 744.
