= Padar, Agsu =

Padar
- Municipality
- Location within Azerbaijan
- Coordinates: 40°35′24″N 48°15′01″E
- Country: Azerbaijan
- Rayon: Agsu

Population
  - Total: 1,624
- Time zone: UTC+4 (AZT)
  - Summer (DST): UTC+5 (AZT)

Padar (also, Padar-Gyul’Mali) is a village and municipality in the Agsu Rayon of Azerbaijan. It has a population of 1,624. The municipality consists of the villages of Padar and Külüllü.
