= Habsiyat =

Genre in Persian literature

Habsiyat (Persian: حبسیات) is a genre in Persian literature that deals with imprisonment. It emerged under the Ghaznavid dynasty (977–1186) and especially thrived under the Shirvanshahs (861–1538). It was created by the poet Masud Sa'd Salman (died 1121) under the Ghaznavids.

== Sources ==
- Gould, Rebecca Ruth (2016). "Wearing the Belt of Oppression: Khāqāni's Christian Qasida and the Prison Poetry of Medieval Shirvān". Journal of Persianate Studies. 9 (1): 19–44. doi:10.1163/18747167-12341296.
- Gould, Rebecca Ruth (2022). The Persian Prison Poem. Edinburgh University Press. ISBN 978-1474484015.
