= Padar, Khachmaz =

Padar
- Location within Azerbaijan
- Coordinates: 41°25′59″N 48°46′42″E
- Country: Azerbaijan
- Rayon: Khachmaz
- Municipality: Armudpadar
- Time zone: UTC+4 (AZT)
  - Summer (DST): UTC+5 (AZT)

Padar is a village in the Khachmaz Rayon of Azerbaijan. The village forms part of the municipality of Armudpadar.
