= Padar, Davachi =

Padar
- Municipality
- Location within Azerbaijan
- Coordinates: 41°19′06″N 48°53′19″E
- Country: Azerbaijan
- Rayon: Davachi

Population
  - Total: 563
- Time zone: UTC+4 (AZT)
  - Summer (DST): UTC+5 (AZT)

Padar (also, Podar) is a village and municipality in the Davachi Rayon of Azerbaijan. It has a population of 563. The municipality consists of the villages of Padar and Borbor.
