= Yergüc, Khachmaz =

Municipality in Azerbaijan

Yergüc
- Municipality
- Location within Azerbaijan
- Coordinates: 41°25′25″N 48°44′50″E
- Country: Azerbaijan
- Rayon: Khachmaz

Population
  - Total: 3,444
- Time zone: UTC+4 (AZT)
  - Summer (DST): UTC+5 (AZT)

Yergüc (also, Yergyuch, Yerkyuch, Yergyudzh, Ot-Yerguch, Borispol, and Barispol) is a village and municipality in the Khachmaz Rayon of Azerbaijan. It has a population of 3,444. The municipality consists of the villages of Yergüc, Bayoba, Üçgünqışlaq, and Sərkərlı.
