= Padar, Oghuz =

Padar
- Municipality
- Location within Azerbaijan Location within Shaki-Zagatala Economic Region
- Coordinates: 40°57′42″N 47°30′54″E
- Country: Azerbaijan
- Rayon: Oghuz

Population
  - Total: 2,224
- Time zone: UTC+4 (AZT)
  - Summer (DST): UTC+5 (AZT)

Padar is a village and municipality in the Oghuz Rayon of Azerbaijan. It has a population of 2,224.
