= Rebecca Gould =

American writer and translator

Rebecca Ruth Gould is a writer, translator, and Distinguished Professor, Comparative Poetics & Global Politics at SOAS University of London. Her interests range across the Caucasus, Comparative Literature, Islam, Islamic Law, Islamic Studies, Persian literature, poetry, and poetics. Her PhD dissertation focused on Persian prison poetry, and was published in revised form as The Persian Prison Poem: Sovereignty and the Political Imagination (2021). Her articles and translations have received awards from English PEN, the International Society for Intellectual History's Charles Schmitt Prize, the Modern Language Association’s Florence Howe Award for Feminist Scholarship, and the British Association for American Studies' Arthur Miller Centre Essay Prize. Gould's work also deals with legal theory and the theory of racism, and she is a critic of the International Holocaust Remembrance Alliance's Working Definition of Antisemitism.

== Career ==
Gould was born and educated in the United States. She received her BA in Comparative Literature and Slavic Studies from the University of California, Berkeley. After working in publishing for a few years, Gould moved to Tbilisi, Georgia in 2004, where she learned Georgian and started to learn Persian. Having lived for two years in Tbilisi, she returned to the United States where she started her PhD at Columbia University's Institute for Comparative Literature and Society and the Department for Middle East, South Asian, & African Studies.

Gould has conducted fieldwork and research in numerous countries and regions, including Iran, Georgia, Syria, Azerbaijan, Chechnya, Ingushetia, Dagestan, India, Egypt, Israel, Palestine and Tajikistan. In addition to the University of Birmingham, she has taught at Columbia University, Yale-NUS College in Singapore, and the University of Bristol. She has also been an associate at the Davis Center for Russian and Eurasian Studies at Harvard University. The literatures Gould has published on include Persian (classical and modern), Georgian (modern and early modern), Russian, Arabic (classical and modern), and American (Langston Hughes, Paul Laurence Dunbar, Thoreau, and Edith Wharton).

Gould's work has been translated into many languages, including Arabic, Persian, Chinese, Russian, German, French, Spanish, Polish, and Portuguese. She directed the European Research Council-funded project "Global Literary Theory" and has also received funding from the British Academy, the British Library, the British Council, and the Harry Frank Guggenheim Foundation. She has held external fellowships with the Van Leer Jerusalem Institute, Central European University's Institute for Advanced Studies, and the Forum for Transregional Studies (Berlin).

== Scholarship ==
Gould's first book was Writers and Rebels: The Literatures of Insurgency in the Caucasus (Yale University Press, 2016), which was awarded the University of Southern California Book Prize in Literary and Cultural Studies and the best book award by the Association for Women in Slavic Studies.

Norihiro Naganawa has described Writers and Rebels as "an astonishing book mediating between spheres that scholars have otherwise explored separately." Mary Childs has written that Gould's "interdisciplinary approach is essential to a more nuanced understanding of the cultures—Chechen and Daghestani, in particular—that tend to get tossed into a single Caucasus basket."

Gould's book Erasing Palestine: Free Speech and Palestinian Freedom (Verso, 2023) was selected as one of the "books our avid readers and critics couldn't put down" by Declan Fry of Australia's ABC News. In assessing the book, Fry wrote, "Gould writes with acuity and a remarkable sense of candour, unafraid to aim her critical lens back upon herself. As she reminds us: 'The struggle for Palestinian freedom and the fight against antisemitism demand each other.'"

== Creative work ==
Gould is also a poet, short story writer, and author of creative nonfiction. Her first poetry collection Cityscapes (2019) was followed by the chapbook Beautiful English (2021). Reviewing Beautiful English, poet Wendy Klein wrote that Gould “leaves the reader with no happy ending [...] There is, however, a satisfying sense of a story, romance, allegory, or both, well told by a highly skilled and insightful storyteller.” On the basis of this chapbook, Gould was selected as the featured poet for The High Window in summer 2021. Her poetry and translations have been nominated several times for the Pushcart Prize.

Gould's first short story collection, Strangers (2025), comprises stories set in Syria, Iran, and the Republic of Georgia. Some of the stories in this volume also appeared in Arabic translation in 2022. Reviewing this collection, Syrian writer Saleh Razzouk wrote that Gould “embodies both the outsider’s gaze and the passionate witness of a writer intent on preserving memory and dignity for oppressed peoples who have borne centuries of injustice.” Writing in L'Esprit Literary Review, Lucas Shiller stated that “the author ... strikes the same fruitful balance between familiarity and distance that Anton Chekhov often did ... a stranger isn't just someone you haven't met.”

Her essay “Watching Chekhov in Tehran” was runner-up for the Beechmore Books Arts Journalism Competition in 2020. Her essay on insomnia in the poetry of Marina Tsvetaevna and Hafez was nominated for a Best of the Net Award in 2021.

== Translations ==
Gould translates from Persian, Georgian, and Russian. Her translations include The Death of Bagrat Zakharych and other stories by Vazha-Pshavela (2019), After Tomorrow the Days Disappear: Ghazals and Other Poems of Hasan Sijzi of Delhi (2016), and Prose of the Mountains: Tales of the Caucasus (2015), which was the first English translation of several stories by Alexander Qazbegi. Her translations with Iranian poet and scholar Kayvan Tahmasebian include High Tide of the Eyes: Poems by Bijan Elahi (2019) and House Arrest: Poems of Hasan Alizadeh (2022), was awarded a PEN Translates Award from English PEN. Gould is also co-editor with Tahmasebian of the Routledge Handbook of Translation and Activism (2020).

== Selected publications ==
A fraction of Gould's works:

Books

- Strangers: Stories (Serving House Books, 2025).
- Erasing Palestine: Free Speech and Palestinian Freedom (London and New York: Verso Books, 2023).
- Persian Prison Poem: Sovereignty and the Political Imagination (Edinburgh: Edinburgh University Press, 2021).
- Writers and Rebels: The Literature of Insurgency in the Caucasus (Yale University Press, 2016).
- Routledge Handbook of Translation and Activism, co-editor with Kayvan Tahmasebian (2020).

Articles

- Enchanting Literary Modernity: Idris Bazorkin’s Postcolonial Soviet Pastoral, Modern Language Review 15(2): 405-428 (2020)
- The Persianate Cosmology of Historical Inquiry in the Caucasus: ʿAbbās Qulī Āghā Bākīkhānūf’s Cosmological Cosmopolitanism, Comparative Literature 71(3): 272–297. (2019)
- Memorializing Akhundzadeh: Contradictory Cosmopolitanism and Post-Soviet Narcissism in Old Tbilisi, Interventions: International Journal of Postcolonial Studies 20(4): 488–509. (2018)
- (co-authored with Shamil Shikhaliev), Beyond the Taqlīd/Ijtihād Dichotomy: Daghestani Legal Thought under Russian Rule, Islamic Law and Society 24(1–2): 142–169. (2017)
- The Persian Translation of Arabic Aesthetics: Rādūyānī’s Rhetorical Renaissance, Rhetorica: A Journal of the History of Rhetoric 33(4): 339–371. (2016)
- The Critique of Religion as Political Critique: Mīrzā Fatḥ ʿAlī Ākhūndzāda’s Pre-Islamic Xenology, Intellectual History Review 26(2): 171–184. (2016)
- Ijtihād against Madhhab: Legal Hybridity and the Meanings of Modernity in Early Modern Daghestan, Comparative Studies in Society and History 57(1): 35-66 (2015).
- The Geographies of ʿAjam: The Circulation of Persian Poetry from South Asia to the Caucasus, The Medieval History Journal 18(1): 87–119. (2015).
- Why Daghestan is Good to Think: Moshe Gammer, Daghestan, and Global Islamic History, in Written Culture in Daghestan, ed. Moshe Gammer (Annales Academiae Scientiarum Fennicae, 2015), 17–40.
- The Lonely Hero and Chechen Modernity: Interpreting the Story of Gekha the Abrek, Journal of Folklore Research 51(2): 199–222. (2014)
- Aleksandre Qazbegi’s Mountaineer Prosaics: The Anticolonial Vernacular on Georgian-Chechen Borderlands, Ab Imperio: Studies of New Imperial History in the Post-Soviet Space 15 (1): 361–390. (2014)
- The Death of Caucasus Philology: Towards a Discipline Beyond Areal Divides, Iran and the Caucasus 17(3): 275-293 (2013)
- The Modernity of Premodern Islam in Contemporary Daghestan, Contemporary Islam: Dynamics of Muslim Life 5(2): 161–183. (2011)
- Secularism and Belief in Georgia’s Pankisi Gorge, Journal of Islamic Studies 22(3): 339-373 (2011).

== Awards ==
- University of Southern California Book Prize in Literary and Cultural Studies
- Best book award by the Association for Women in Slavic Studies
- International Society for Intellectual History's Charles Schmitt Prize
- Modern Language Association's Florence Howe Award for Feminist Scholarship
- British Association for American Studies’ Arthur Miller Centre Essay Prize
- PEN Translates Award (English PEN)
