= Jan Rypka =

Czech orientalist, translator and professor

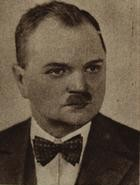
- Rypka before 1960
- Born: 28 May 1886; Kroměříž, Moravia, Austria-Hungary
- Died: 29 December 1968 (aged 82); Prague, Czechoslovakia

Academic background
- Education: University of Vienna

Academic work
- Discipline: Oriental studies
- Sub-discipline: Iranology; Turkology
- Institutions: Charles University

Signature
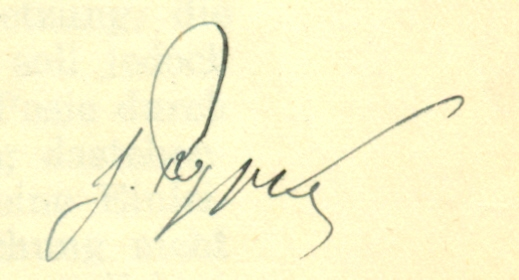

Jan Rypka, PhDr., Dr.Sc. (28 May 1886 – 29 December 1968) was a Czech orientalist and translator. He was a professor of Iranology and Turkology at Charles University in Prague.

Jan Rypka was a participant in Ferdowsi Millenary Celebration in Tehran in 1934.

== Early life ==
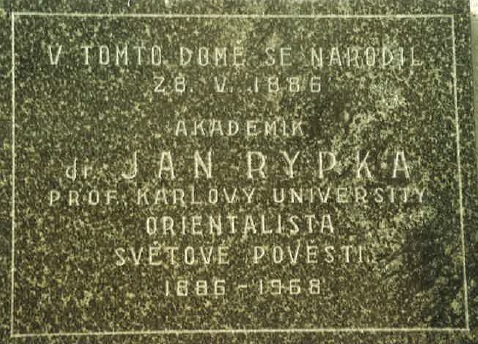
Memorial plaque on his native house in Kroměříž

Rypka was born on 28 May 1886 in Kroměříž. His father owned a small business. As a child he was given the Arabian Nights. He described the book's effect on his life as breathing "mysterious forces there." After completing his schooling he enrolled at the University of Vienna. He graduated in Oriental studies. Then in 1910 he obtained a Doctor of Philosophy in Islamic languages.

After graduation Rypka set up a small business of translating Oriental texts. However, he soon left the business because he found a better job, even if not so closely related to his orientalist background, as he was appointed at the Viennese court and university printing office. Rypka moved to Prague following the establishment of the independent Czechoslovak state. There he devoted himself fully to Oriental studies. He also joined the civil service for a short time. In April 1921, he found work as a librarian. That same summer, he was granted a sabbatical leave to travel to Constantinople. Rypka stayed in Constantinople for nearly a year and a half. In that ancient city he found ample opportunities to know and understand the Orient close up, an experience he put in the book he wrote about his stay in Turkey.

== Return From Constantinople ==
Rypka once again began work at the Ministry of Education after returning from Constantinople. He began working on Turkish poetry, analyzing the works of such poets as Sabit and Bâkî. Beginning in the 1930s, Rypka moved his focus to Persian poetry. The central figure in his research was the Persian poet Nizami. Another of his key subjects was the medieval poet Ferdowsi. In the fall of 1934 Rypka was invited by the Iranian government to attend the celebrations of the 1000th anniversary of Ferdous' birth. He ended up spending a full year in Iran, doing academic research. He wrote about his year in Iran in the popular book Iranian Pilgrim.

== Oriental Institute ==
Rypka was the driving force behind the establishment of the Oriental Institute, of which he was one of the earliest members. He contributed to the institute's development, contributing not only as a journalist but as an adviser and patron in its incipient stages. He is even credited with naming the institute's archives, the Archive Oriental.

== Works ==
In 1939 Rypka was appointed dean of the Faculty of Arts of the Charles University in Prague. During his tenure, he focused the research on Persian poets, notably Labbibi and Farrochi. His biggest achievement was the work on the history of Persian and Tajik literature, which was published in 1956. The work won critical acclaim from fellow professionals and was translated into many languages.
