= Shamakhi District =

District in eastern Azerbaijan

Coordinates: 40°38′N 48°40′E

- District
- Map of Azerbaijan showing Shamakhi District
- Country: Azerbaijan
- Region: Mountainous Shirvan
- Established: 8 August 1930
- Capital: Shamakhi
- Settlements: 63

Government
  - Governor: Tahir Mammadov

Area
  - Total: 1,670 km^{2} (640 sq mi)

Population (2020)
  - Total: 106,400
  - Density: 63.7/km^{2} (165/sq mi)
- Time zone: UTC+4 (AZT)
- Postal code: 5600
- Website: shamaxi-ih.gov.az

Shamakhi District (Azerbaijani: Şamaxı rayonu) is one of the 66 districts of Azerbaijan. It is located in the east of the country and belongs to the Mountainous Shirvan Economic Region. The district borders the districts of Quba, Khizi, Gobustan, Hajigabul, Agsu, and Ismayilli. Its capital and largest city is Shamakhi. As of 2020, the district has a population of 106,400.

In its history, eleven major earthquakes have rocked Shamakhi, but each time it was reconstructed by its inhabitants due to its role as the economic and administrative capital of Shirvan and one of the key towns on the Silk Road. The only building to have survived eight of the eleven earthquakes is the landmark Juma Mosque (8th century CE).

== History ==
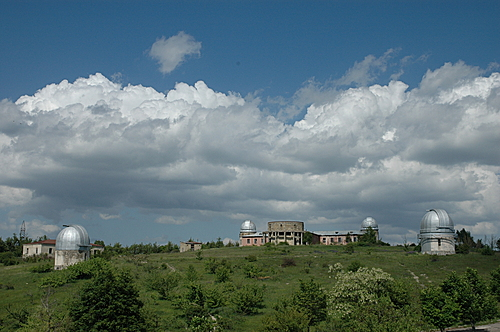
Astrophysical Observatory in Shamakhi.

Shamakhi was first mentioned as Kamachia by ancient Greco-Roman geographer Claudius Ptolemaeus in the 1st to 2nd century CE. It was an important town during the Middle Ages and served as the capital of the Shirvanshah state from the 8th to 15th centuries and capital of the independent Shirvan Khanate, also known as the Khanate of Shamakhi. The Catholic friar, missionary, and explorer William of Rubruck passed there on his return journey from the Mongol Great Khan's court.

In the middle of the 16th century, it was the seat of an English commercial factory, under the traveller Anthony Jenkinson, afterwards envoy extraordinary of the khan of Shirvan to Tsar Ivan IV the Terrible of Russia.

Adam Olearius, who visited Shamakhi in 1637, wrote: "Its inhabitants are in part Armenians and Georgians, who have their particular language; they would not understand each other if they did not use Turkish, which is common to all and very familiar, not only in Shirvan but also everywhere in Persia." The Russians first entered Shirvan in 1723 but soon retired, leaving it to Ottomans, who possessed it in 1723–35. In 1742 Shamakhi was taken and destroyed by Nadir Shah of Persia, who, to punish the inhabitants for their Sunnite creed, built a new town under the same name about 26 kilometres (16 mi) to the west, at the foot of the main chain of the Caucasus Mountains. The new Shamakhi was at different times a residence of the Shirvan Khanate, but it was finally abandoned, and the old town rebuilt. In the mid-1700s, the population of Shamakhi was about 60,000, most of whom were Armenians. The Shirvan Khanate was finally annexed by Russia in 1805.

The British Penny Cyclopaedia stated in 1833 that "The bulk of the population of Shirvan consists of the Tatar, or, to speak more correctly, Turkish race, with some admixture of Arabs and Persians. . . . Besides the Mohammedans, who form the mass of the population, there are many Armenians, some Jews, and a few Gipsies. According to the official returns of 1831, the number of males belonging to the Mohammedan population was 62.934; Armenians, 6,375; Jews, 332; total males, 69,641. The prevalent language of Shirvan is what is there called Toorkee or Turkish, which is also used in Azerbijan." The same source also states that according to the official returns of 1832, the city of Shamakhi was inhabited by only 2,233 families, as a result of the devastation from the sack of the city "in the most barbarous manner by the highlanders of Daghestan" in 1717. The Encyclopædia Britannica stated that in 1873, the city had 25,087 inhabitants, "of which 18,680 were Tartars and Shachsevans, 5,177 were Armenians, and 1,230 Russians." Silk production continued to be the main output, with 130 silk-winding establishments, owned mostly by Armenians, although the industry had considerably declined since 1864.

Shamakhi was the capital of the Shamakhi Governorate of the Russian Empire until the devastating earthquake of 1859, when the capital of the province was transferred to Baku. The importance of the city declined sharply afterwards. According to the Brockhaus and Efron Encyclopedic Dictionary (vol. 77, p. 460, published in 1903), Shamakhi had 20008 inhabitants (10450 males and 9558 females), of which 3% were Russians, 18% were Armenians, and 79% were "Azerbaijani Tatars." With regard to religion, 79% of the population was Muslim, of which 22% was Sunni and the rest Shiite; the remaining 21% was "Armeno-Gregorian" (members of the Armenian Apostolic Church) and "Pravoslav" (Orthodox).

The "Queen of Shemakha" is a major protagonist in the poem "The Tale of the Golden Cockerel" by Alexander Pushkin, on which the opera "The Golden Cockerel" by Nikolay Rimsky-Korsakov was based. The character, however, is totally fictional and bears no actual relation to the city.

== Demographics ==
According to the State Statistics Committee, as of 2018, the population of the city recorded 103,900 persons, which increased by 22,500 persons (about 27.6 percent) from 81,400 persons in 2000. Of the total population, 52,100 are men and 51,800 are women. More than 28 percent of the population (about 29,000 persons) consists of young people and teenagers aged 14–29.

The population of the district by the year (at the beginning of the year, thsd. persons)
Region	2000	2001	2002	2003	2004	2005	2006	2007	2008	2009	2010	2011	2012	2013	2014	2015	2016	2017	2018
Shamakhy region	81,4	82,3	83,1	84,0	84,8	86,0	87,3	88,4	90,0	91,4	92,5	93,7	95,3	96,9	98,3	99,7	101,2	102,7	103,9
urban population	34,3	34,9	35,6	36,3	38,0	39,9	40,8	41,3	42,3	43,2	43,7	44,2	44,9	45,6	46,2	46,9	47,6	48,3	48,9
rural population	47,1	47,4	47,5	47,7	46,8	46,1	46,5	47,1	47,7	48,2	48,8	49,5	50,4	51,3	52,1	52,8	53,6	54,4	55,0

=== Ethnic composition ===
Ethnic group	Population	% of total
Azerbaijanis	90,350	98.63%
Turks	879	0.96%
Russians	235	0.26%
Lezgians	87	0.09%
Georgians	21	0.02%
Tats	6	0.01%
Others	27	0.04%

== Earthquakes ==
- The 1191 earthquake was so destructive that the capital of Shirvan was transferred to Baku.
- The 1667 earthquake is considered to have been the deadliest for the city, with a death toll of 80,000; one-third of the city collapsed, according to the Persian merchants' reports.
- The 1859 Shamakhi earthquake on 2 December caused the shifting of the same-named government centre to Baku.
- The 1872 earthquake triggered emigration to Baku, where oil production had started in industrial proportions.
- The 1902 earthquake, a devastating earthquake, destroyed the 10th-century Juma Mosque.

== Nature ==
The productivity of lands in Shamakhi has always attracted people. The district has beautiful nature with a mild climate and mineral wells. The weather is not too cold or hot here. There are more than 50 medicinal plants in Shamakhi. The rich nature of the district allows various animals and birds to settle here. The fauna of the city have different animals such as roe, boars, bears, and wild cats. 40–80 days of a year snow in this place. This district attracts tourists in summer and winter. Babadagh peak is also in Shamakhi. Rivers of Garachay, Valvalachay and Girdmanchay begin here in Babadagh.

== Education ==
Not only Azerbaijan but also the Middle East, Central Asia, Turkey, and the other countries had studied science in the madrassah of Juma mosque since the end of the 19th century. Some of them, such as Khagani Shirvani, Feleki Shirvani, Muslim Shirvani, Imadeddin Nasimi, Nishat Shirvani, Mir Nazim Shirvani, Seyid Azim Shirvani, Mirza Nasrulla bey Dede, Mahmud Aga, Habib Efendi, Seyid Ünsizade and others. Was a prominent, intelligent educator.

In the Middle Ages, multiple madrasahs of large mosques functioned in several cities of Azerbaijan. In the 10th–13th centuries, multiple cities of Azerbaijan, including Tabriz, Maragha, Ganja, Nakhchivan, Shamakhi, and Ardabil, were known as the centres of science, education, art and culture in the East.

According to 17th-century famous Turkish traveller E. Chalabi, there were 40 schools, 7 madrassas in Shamakhi.

Nowadays, there are 72 secondary schools in the region, Shamakhi branch of the Azerbaijan Teachers Institute, Shamakhi Humanitarian College, Shamakhi State Industrial Economic College, and the Shamakhi Astrophysical Observatory of the National Academy of Sciences.

== Culture ==
As one of the largest wine-growing regions of Azerbaijan, Shamakhi hosted the Grape and Wine Festival in August 2019 in Meysari village with the support of Heydar Aliyev Foundation. The festival was aimed to encourage local grape and wine production, as well as, to promote the history of wine production in Azerbaijan. The festival featured a wine exhibition, a parade of wine producers, an exhibition of different types of folk art of Azerbaijani districts, including copper craft, carpet weaving and pottery.

== Twin cities ==
- Iğdır, Turkey

== Notable natives ==
- Falaki Shirvani, poet, (1107, (Shamakhi – 1157, Shamakhi)
- Khagani Shirvani, poet, (1121/1122, Shamakhi – 1190, Tabriz)
- Imadaddin Nasimi, poet, (1369, Shamakhi – 1417, Aleppo)
- Zeynalabdin Shirvani, geographer, historian, ethnographer, philosopher and poet (16 August 1780, Shamakhi – 1838, near Jeddah)
- Seyid Azim Shirvani, poet, (10 July 1835 – 1 Iyun 1888)
- Alexander Shirvanzade (Movsisyan), novelist, playwright (18 April 1858, Shamakhi – 7 August 1935, Kislovodsk)
- Mirza Alakbar Sabir, poet (30 May 1862, Shamakhi – 12 July 1911, Shamakhi)
- Hovhannes Abelian, actor (23 October 1865, Shamakhi – 1 July 1936, Yerevan)
- Abbas Sahhat, poet (1874, Shamakhi – 11 July 1918, Ganja)
- Muhammed hadi, poet (1879, Shamakhi – 1920 Ganja)
- Zivar bey Ahmadbeyov, architect (1873 Shamakhi – 1925 Baku)
- Sultan Mejid Qanizade, teacher, writer
- Kostan Zarian, writer (2 February 1885, Shamakhi – 11 December 1969, Yerevan)
- Armen Ohanian, dancer, actress, writer, political activist (1887, Shamakhi – 1976, Mexico)

== Gallery ==
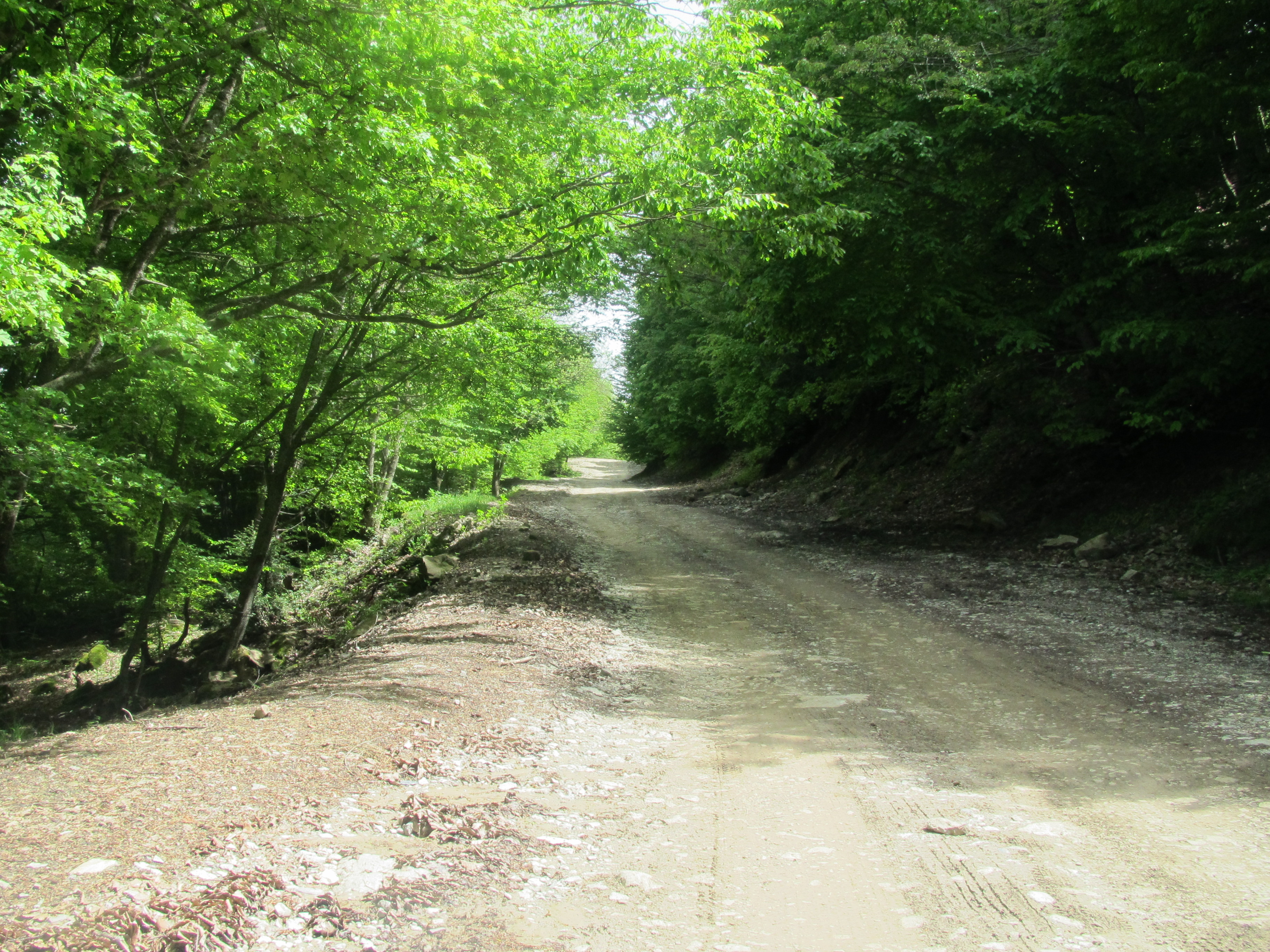

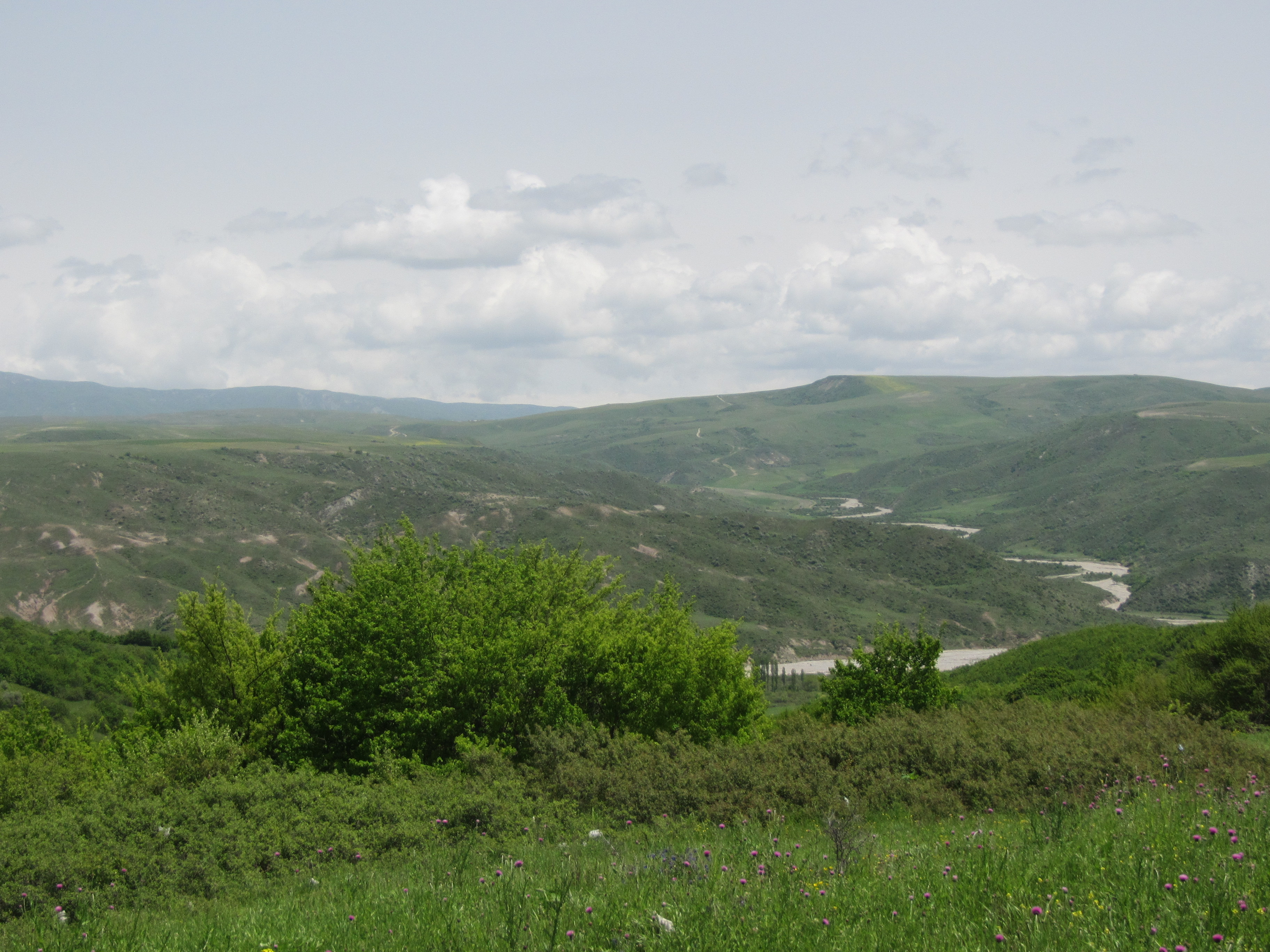

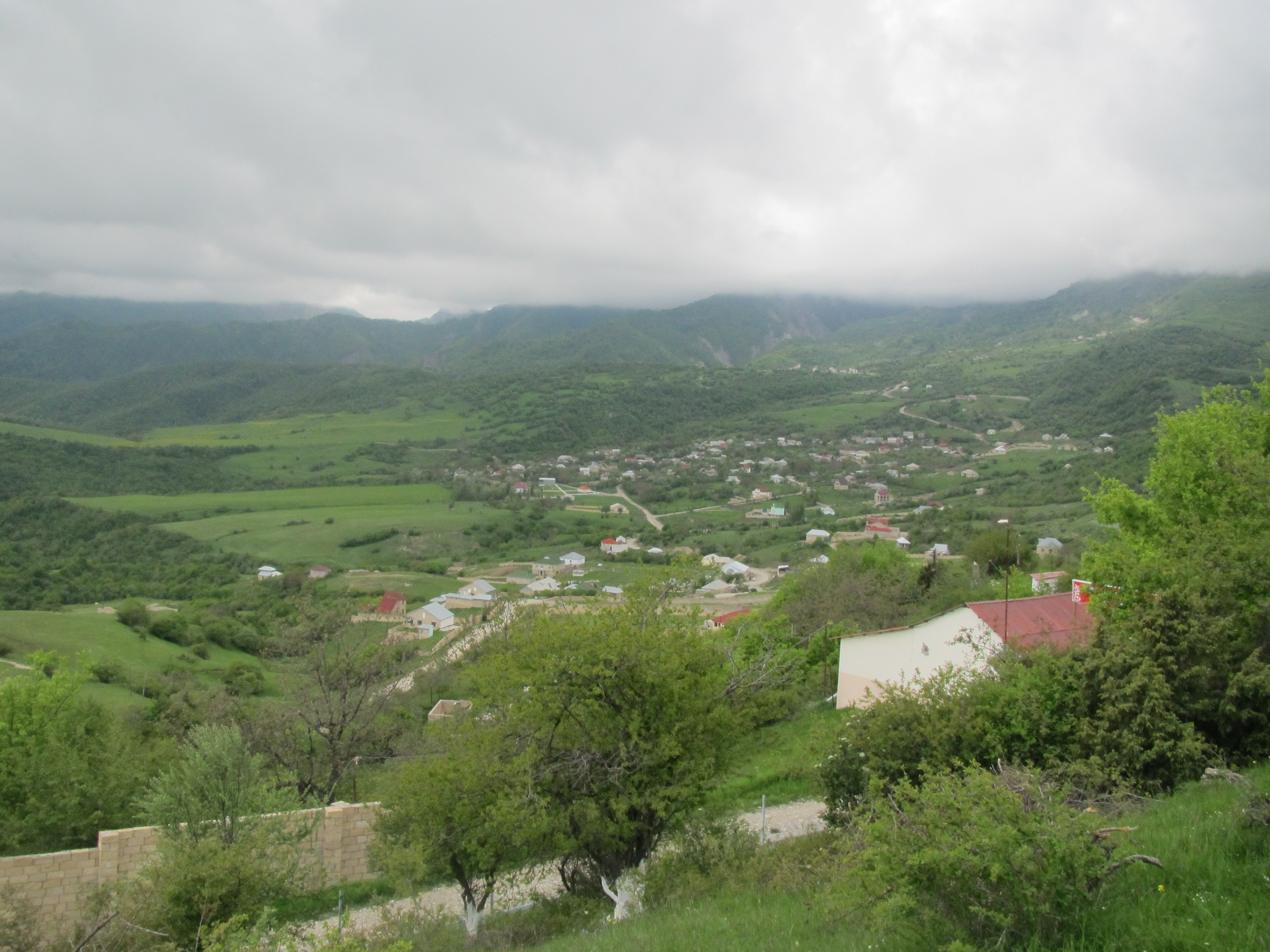

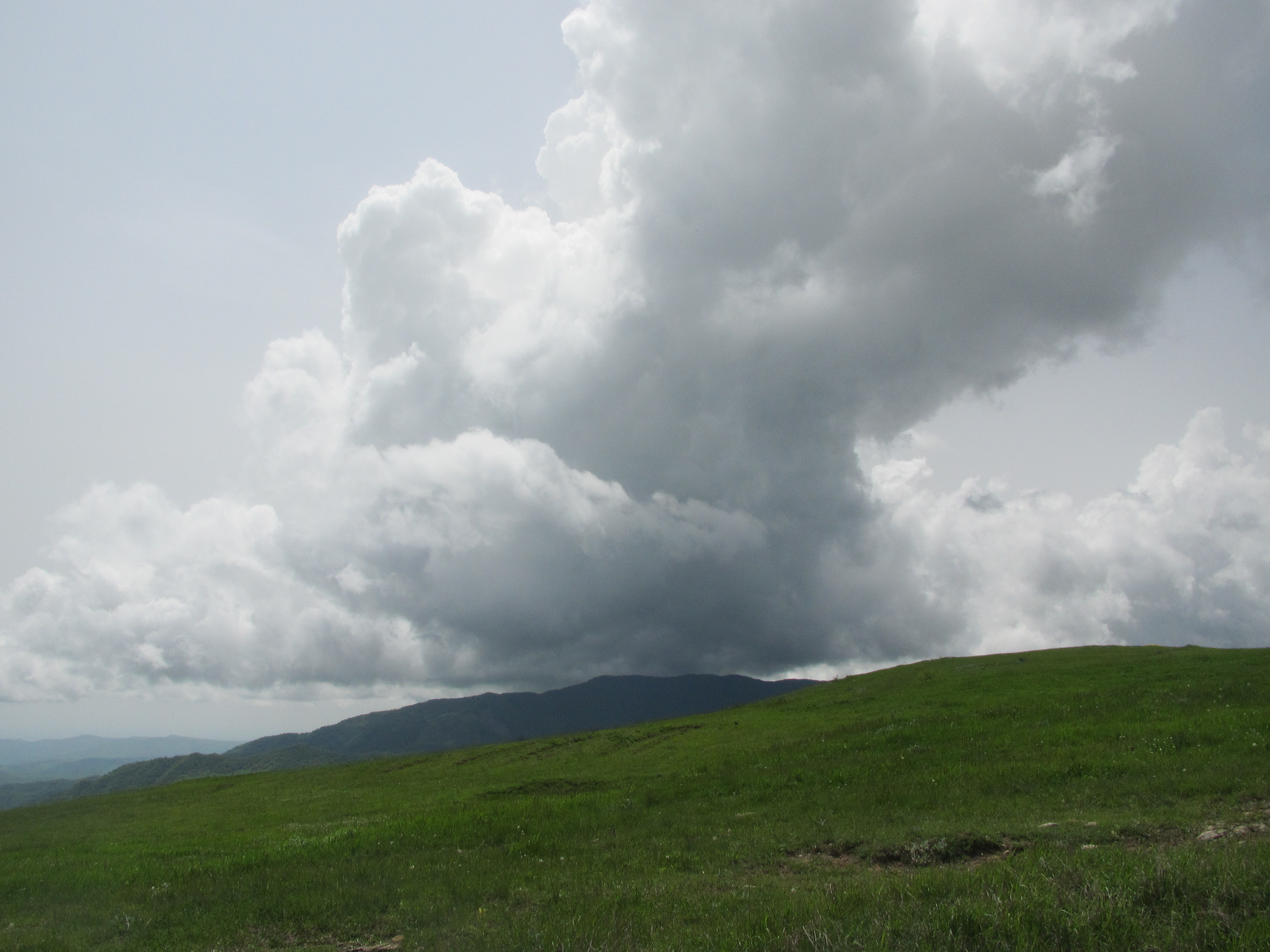

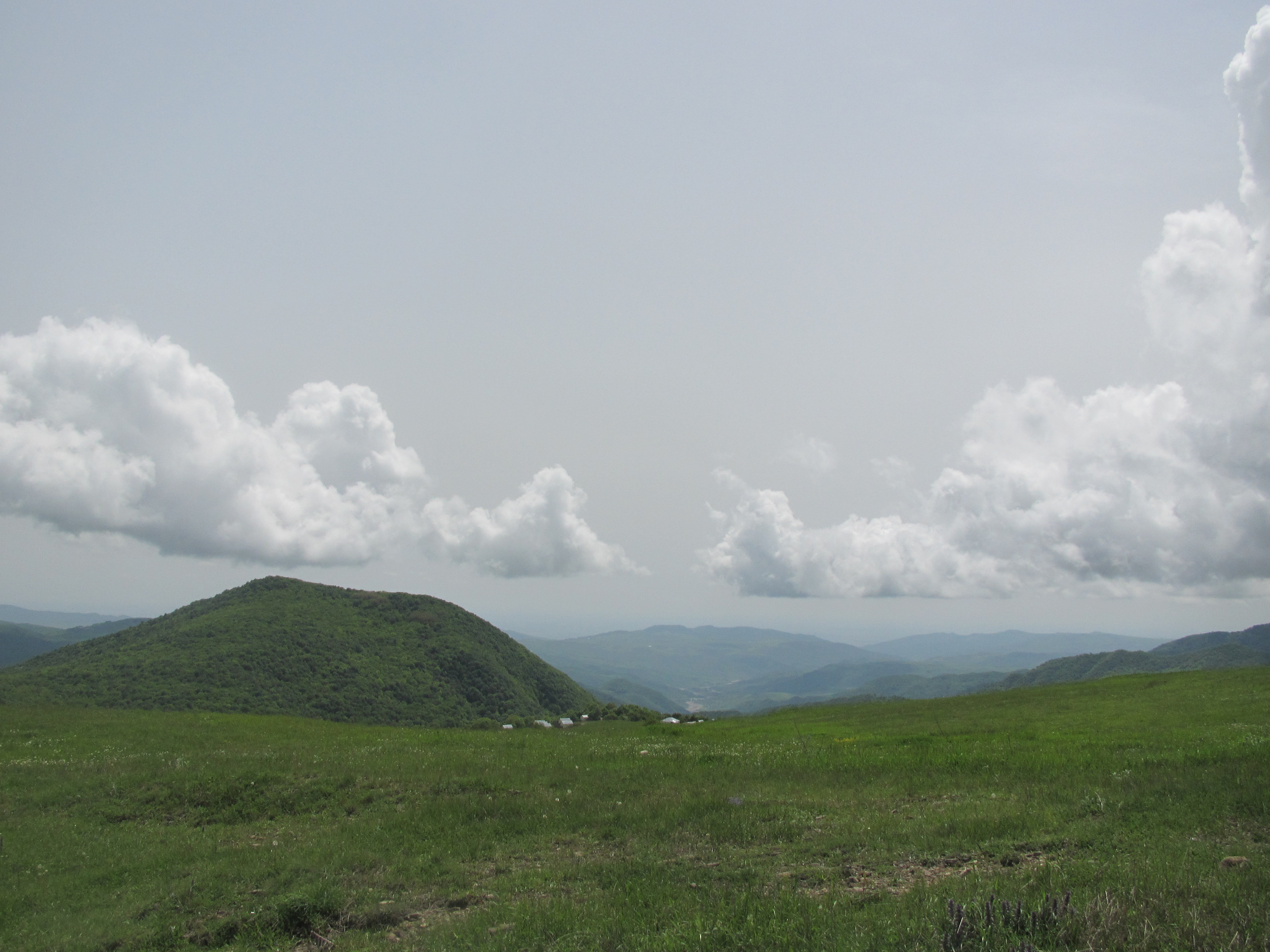
