= Hatef Esfahani =

Iranian poet

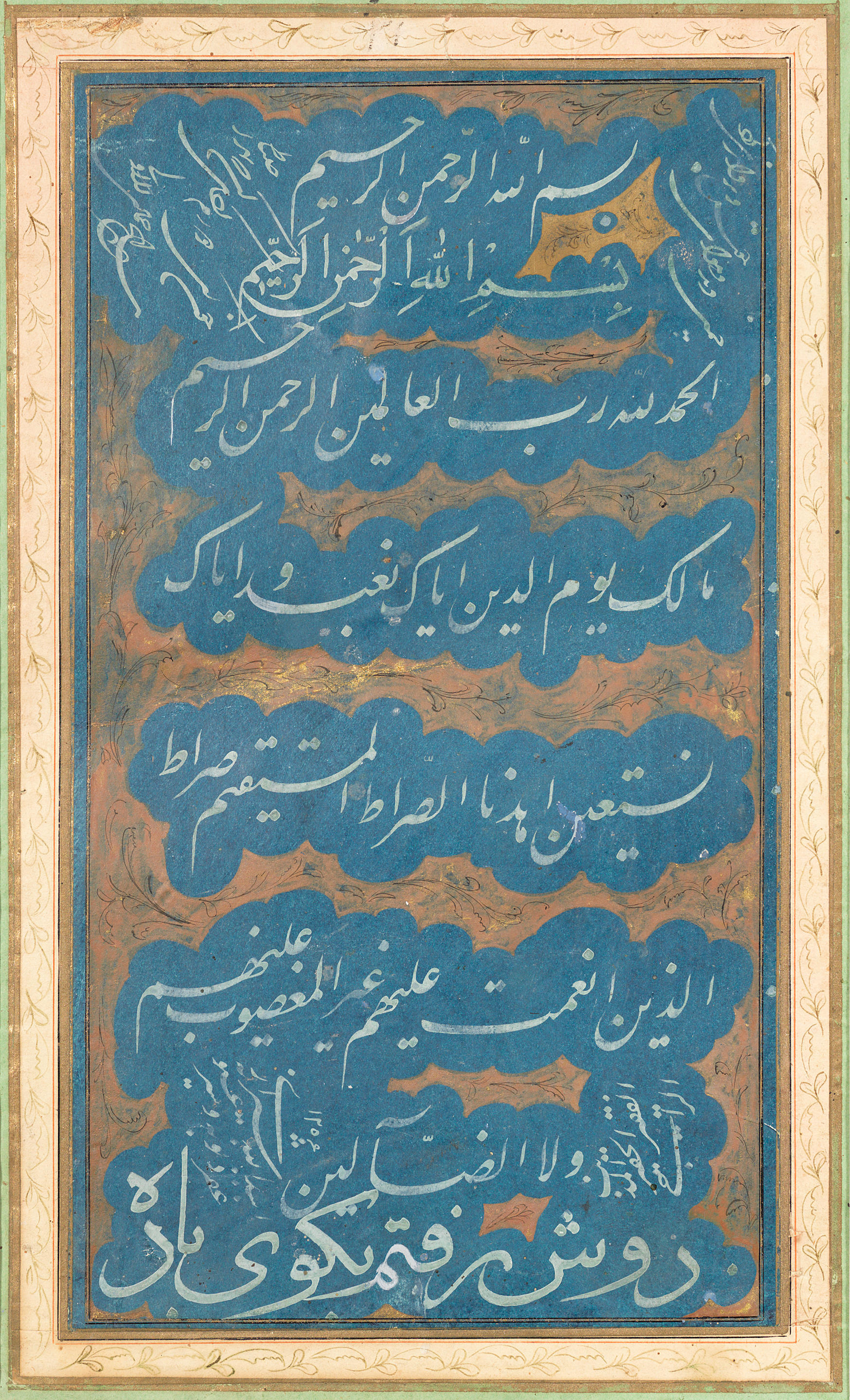
- An album page with a calligraphic composition incorporating various writings, including a verse by Hatef Esfahani, signed by Asadollah Shirazi in July 1840
- Born: Sayyed Ahmad Esfahani; 18th-century Isfahan, Safavid Iran
- Died: 1783/84 Qom, Zand Iran
- Occupation: Poet
- Language: Persian; Arabic
- Literary movement: Bazgasht-e adabi
- Children: Sahab Esfahani (son); Rashha (daughter)

Hatef Esfahani (Persian: هاتف اصفهانی) was an 18th-century poet based in Isfahan during the collapse of the Safavid dynasty of Iran and the chaos that followed. He was one of the earliest and leading members of the literary movement Bazgasht-e adabi, which advocated for a return to the fundamentals of classical Persian poetry in protest against the excessively "unnatural" nature of the Indian style that dominated poetry in Iran and Persian-speaking India.

Hatef was born during the first half of the 18th-century in Isfahan, where he lived most of his life. His family had relocated there from Ordubad during the Safavid era. He was educated in traditional sciences by Naser Talib (died 1777) and literary arts by Mir Sayyed Ali Moshtaq (died 1757/58). In Isfahan, Mir Sayyed Ali Moshtaq established a literary group (later known as Anjuman-i Adabī-yi Moshtāq, "Moshtaq’s literary society") with other prominent academics, including Hatef, Sabahi Bigdeli, Tabib Esfahani, Asheq Esfahani, and Azar Bigdeli, the author of the biographical anthology Atashkadeh-ye Azar ("Azar's fire temple"). The two well-known Persian poets from Shiraz, Saadi Shirazi and Hafez, served as models for the group, as they desired to create poetry in the Iraqi style.

One of his notable works is tarjiʿ-band, a poem in five stanzas with a recurring refrain in Arabic and Persian referring to divine unity.

In addition to Isfahan, Hatef also briefly resided in Kashan and spent his final years in Qom, where he died in 1783 or 1784. He had a son, Sahab Esfahani, and daughter, Rashha, both of whom also wrote poetry.

== Sources ==
- Meneghini, Daniela (2017). "Hātif Iṣfahānī". In Fleet, Kate; Krämer, Gudrun; Matringe, Denis; Nawas, John; Rowson, Everett (eds.). Encyclopaedia of Islam (3rd ed.). Brill Online. ISSN 1873-9830.
- Safa, Dabih-Allah; EIr (2003). "Hātef, Sayyed Aḥmad Eṣfahāni". In Yarshater, Ehsan (ed.). Encyclopædia Iranica. Vol. XII/1: Harem I–Hedāyat al-mota'allemin. London and New York: Routledge & Kegan Paul. pp. 54–55. ISBN 978-0-933273-74-0.
