= Heyran Donboli =

19th-century Iranian female poet

- Born: Between 1785 and 1790; Nakhchivan/Tabriz/Urmia, Qajar Iran
- Died: 19th-century Qajar Iran
- Occupation: Poet
- Writing career
- Language: Persian; Azerbaijani Turkic
- Movement: Bazgasht-e adabi

Heyran Donboli (Note: Also spelled Hayran Dunbuli and Heyran Khanim.) (Persian: حیران دنبلی) was an Iranian female poet who composed works in Persian, as well as some in Azerbaijani Turkic. Born between 1785–1790, she was a member of the Turkic-speaking Kurdish Donboli tribe in the Azerbaijan region. Her exact name and birthplace remain uncertain, with suggestions including Nakhchivan, Tabriz and Urmia.

Following the Iranian cession of Nakhchivan to Russia in 1813, she and her family moved south of the Aras River, settling in the village of Khaneqah Sorkh. Heyran's poetry, characterized by its straightforward language and emotional expression of women's experiences, was a rarity in Qajar Iran, where literacy was low and women's public roles were limited in a male dominated society. She was a proponent of the Bazgasht-e adabi literary movement, advocating a return to classical Persian styles.

== Life ==
Little is known about her life. She was born between 1785–1790, and was a member of the Turkic-speaking Kurdish Donboli tribe, which held administrative positions in the Azerbaijan region (Khoy, Tabriz and Salmas) in northwestern Iran. She was the daughter or sister of a certain Karim Khan Kangarlu Donboli. Her real name is uncertain; it may have been "Jeyran", which she may have changed due to it being too common in Azerbaijan. "Heyran" was a popular pen name in poetry; two male poets are also known to have used it, such as Gholamreza Yazdi.

Heyran's birthplace is disputed, Nakhchivan, Tabriz and Urmia have all been suggested. She lived in Nakhchivan with her family and clan, but after Iran was forced to cede the territory to Russia in 1813, they moved to the south of the Aras River. It was there that Karim Khan met the Iranian crown prince Abbas Mirza, who gave him possession over the village of Khaneqah Sorkh near Urmia, where Heyran's family then settled. Despite being engaged, Heyran was not married, and her forced relocation from Nakhchivan caused her to be permanently apart from her partner. Heyran mentions the epidemic that hit Azerbaijan between 1828–1832, mourning the death of the affected Shia Muslims, including the youth. When Naser al-Din Mirza (the later Naser al-Din Shah Qajar), the son of Mohammad Shah Qajar and Malek Jahan Khanom, was born on 17 July 1831, Heyran composed a poem to congratulate Malek Jahan Khanom.

It is uncertain when Heyran died. The Iranian intellectual Mohammad Ali Tarbiat wrote that he was told by Heyran's relatives that she died around the age of 80. According to the Iranian literary scholar Ruhangiz Karachi, Heyran's poetry suggests that she lived during the reign of three Qajar rulers of Iran, Fath-Ali Shah Qajar (r. 1797–1834), Mohammad Shah Qajar (r. 1834–1848) and Naser al-Din Shah Qajar (r. 1848–1896).

== Writings ==
Heyran's divan (collection of poetry) encompasses 3588 couplets, the ones in Persian being 333 ghazals, 68 quatrains, 16 masnavis, 8 musammats, 2 mixed poems, 3 story poems, 5 odes, and 2 ode-ghazals. The remaining are 41 poems in Azerbaijani Turkic, which comprises mixed poems, ghazals and limerick. Contrary to her writings in Azerbaijani Turkic, no extensive study has been made of her Persian writings. Heyran was a supporter of the Bazgasht-e adabi, a literary style and movement that emerged in 18th-century Iran, which advocated for the return of the Khorasani and Iraqi styles in Persian literature. The center of the style was in Isfahan, but it was also supported in Azerbaijan, which Heyran helped popularize. An example of her poetry is from the following;

"How long will you enslave me in your shackles?

Is there a God to undo your shackles? I know not what I have done that Fate

Would have me fall in your trap headlong straight"

A female poet like Heyran was a rarity in Qajar Iran. Around 97% of the population was illiterate, while the remaining 3% could read and write Persian to a limited extent as well as usually understand the Quran. Girls attending home schools was not typical, and the opportunity to do so was limited to court girls and households with clergy members. In both the public sphere and society, women were sidelined. Only women from a family of nobility or government officials had the chance to study or pursue a career in poetry during the Qajar era.

Living in a male dominated society, women found it difficult to communicate their emotions and experiences, even through poetry. Heyran's poetry is unique due to expressing the emotions of women, something that is uncommon among poetry written by female poets. She uses her own life to illustrate in the poem the circumstances under which women lived in a society where they were expected to serve only in the home and to help others. Heyran's poems are primarily about love; half of them depict the sorrow of a female poet recounting events from her life which she describes as uninteresting. Her writings about the lover and the beloved is a type of poetry that became popular in Safavid Iran. Communication between the lover and the beloved was marked by aggression, blame, and abuse as the lover felt inferior to the beloved and sought attention from the latter.

Her poems are written in a straightforward language; they lack any hidden meanings or philosophical ideas, and because they do not contain several meanings, they are simple to understand. She makes use of commonly used rhetorical devices and figurative language like metaphors, similes, and allusions. She rarely uses figures of speech that are hard to understand. Grammatical errors can be found in her Persian poetry. According to Karachi, Heyran's usage of repetitious, and occasionally outdated vocabulary may be due to her mother tongue being Azerbaijani Turkic. She adds that Heyran also has poems of high quality, and considers her to be one of the most successful female poets of the Qajar era.

== Sources ==
- Daadbeh, Asghar (2015). "Bāzgasht-i Adabī". In Madelung, Wilferd; Daftary, Farhad (eds.). Encyclopaedia Islamica Online. Brill Online. ISSN 1875-9831.
- Hanaway, William L. (1989). "Bāzgašt-e adabī". In Yarshater, Ehsan (ed.). Encyclopædia Iranica. Vol. IV/1: Bāyju–Behruz. London and New York: Routledge & Kegan Paul. pp. 58–60. ISBN 978-0-71009-124-6.
- Karachi, Ruhangiz (2015). "The study of Poetry by Heyran Donboli and her manuscript". Journal of Persian Language & Literature (Former Journal of the Faculty of Literature, University of Tabriz) (in Persian). 67 (229): 111–135.
- Karachi, Ruhangiz (2024). "The History of Women's Poetry: Beginning to the Present". Encyclopaedia Iranica.
- Oberling, Pierre (2004). "Kurdish tribes". Encyclopaedia Iranica.
