= Azar Bigdeli =

Iranian poet and anthologist (1722–1781)

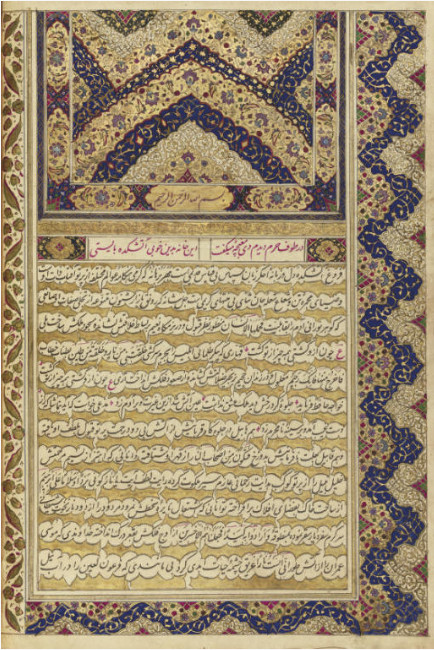
- Manuscript of Azar Bigdeli's Atashkadeh-ye Azar. Copy made in Qajar Iran, dated 1824
- Born: 7 February 1722; Isfahan, Safavid Iran
- Died: 1781 (aged 58–59); Qom, Zand Iran
- Occupations: Anthologist, poet
- Relatives: Agha Khan Bigdeli Shamlu (father), died 1737 or 1738; Esḥāq Beg ʿUdhrī (brother), died 1771 or 1772; Wali Mohammad Khan Bigdeli (paternal uncle), died 1763
- Writing career
- Pen name: Azar
- Notable work: Atashkadeh-ye Azar

Hajji Lotf-Ali Beg Azar Bigdeli, (Note: Persian: لطفعلی بیک (آذر) بیگدلی; also spelled "Lutf-Ali Beg Adhar Begdili".) better known as Azar Bigdeli (Persian: آذر بیگدلی; "Azar" was his pen name; 1722–1781), was an Iranian anthologist and poet. He is principally known for his biographical anthology of some 850 Persian-writing poets, the Atashkadeh-ye Azar (lit. 'Azar's Fire Temple'), which he dedicated to Iranian ruler Karim Khan Zand (r. 1751–1779). Written in Persian, the Persian studies academic J.T.P. de Bruijn considers it "the most important Persian anthology of the eighteenth century". Azar was a leading figure of the bazgasht-e adabi (lit. 'literary return') movement, which sought to return the stylistic standards of early Persian poetry.

== Life ==
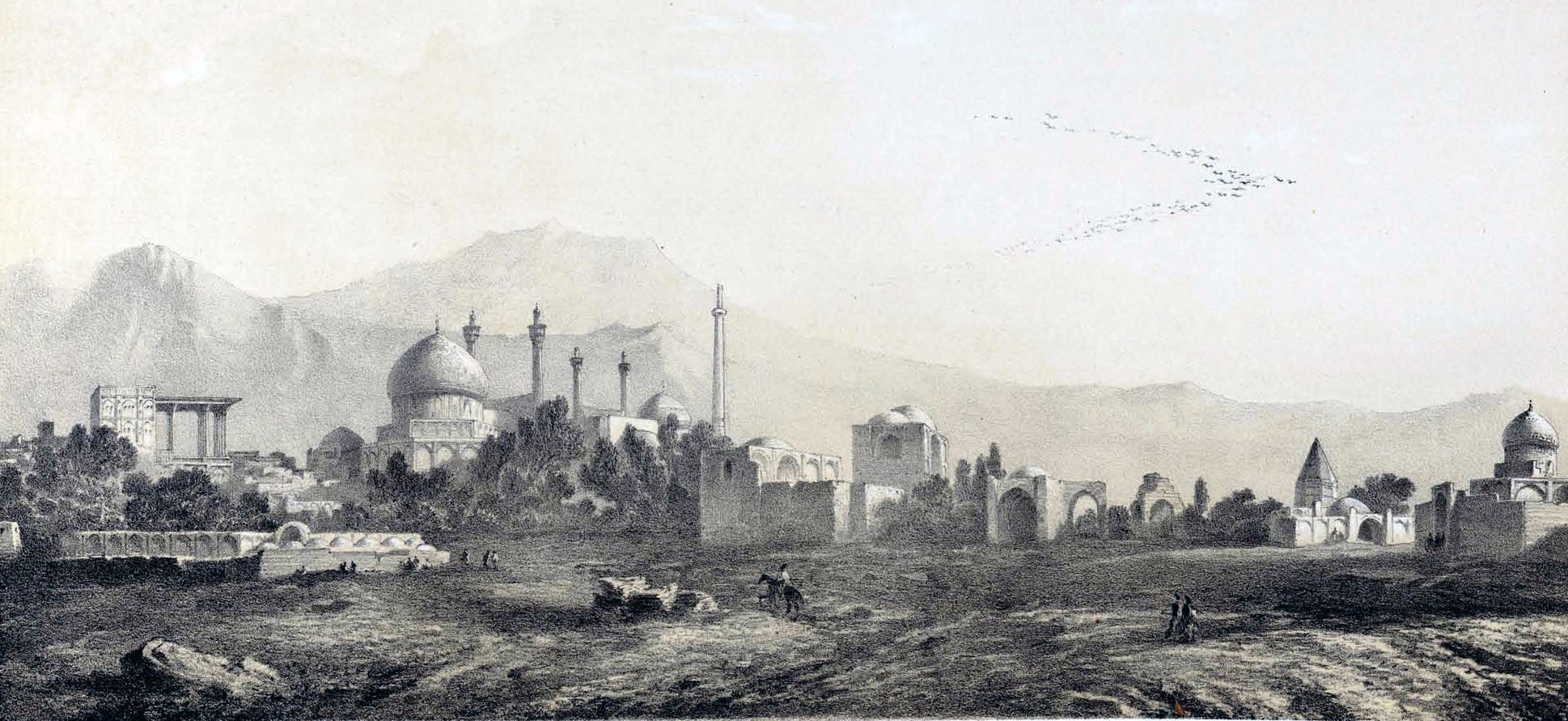
An illustration of Isfahan from the south. Drawn in 1840 by Eugène Flandin

Azar was born on 7 February 1722 in Isfahan, the royal capital of Safavid Iran, during a time of chaos and instability. The year he was born, the Safavid state had entered the final stages of collapse and the rebellious Afghans had reached Isfahan. Azar and his family were forced to move from Isfahan to Qom, where they owned property, and he lived there for 14 years. Azar's family descended from the Bigdeli branch of the Turkoman Shamlu tribe. His ancestors and other Shamlu-tribe members moved from Syria to Iran in the 15th century during the last few years of Timur's reign and settled in Isfahan, where they served the rulers of Iran. Many of Azar's relatives were prominent in the late Safavid era and during the subsequent reign of Nader Shah (r. 1736–1747) as diplomats and bureaucrats.

Around 1735 or 1736, Azar's father Agha Khan Bigdeli Shamlu was appointed governor of Lar and the coastal areas of Fars province by Nader Shah and Azar, and his family moved to Shiraz, the provincial capital of Fars. In 1737 or 1738, after the death of his father, Azar made pilgrimages to Mecca and the Shi'ite shrines in Iran and Iraq. His subsequent arrival in Mashhad coincided with Nader Shah's return from his successful Indian campaign. Azar subsequently enlisted in Nader's army and accompanied his troops to Mazandaran, Azerbaijan, and Persian Iraq. After Nader's death in 1747, Azar served his nephews and successors Adel Shah (r. 1747–1748) and Ebrahim Shah (r. 1748), and the Safavid pretenders Ismail III and Suleiman II before retiring to his modest manor in Qom.

When Karim Khan Zand (r. 1751–1779) ascended to the throne, Azar decided to devote his time to scholarly pursuits and returned to Isfahan, where he and other poets of the bazgasht-e adabi movement benefitted from the peaceful conditions under Karim Khan's rule and the support of the cities' Zand governor Mirzā ʿAbd ol-Vahhāb (died 1760), who was a patron of the arts. The city was sacked by Ali Mardan Khan Bakhtiari in 1750, and Azar reportedly lost about 7,000 of his early written verses; however, he was still a respected poet during his lifetime. In 1774 or 1775, Azar was forced to leave Isfahan again, due to misrule by Zand governor Hājji Mohammad Ranāni Esfahāni (in office; 1760–1765). He and his friend Hatef Esfahani (died 1783), who was also a native of Isfahan and a member of the bazgasht-e adabi movement, eventually ended up at Kashan, where their mutual friend Sabahi Bidgoli (died 1803) had lived most of his life. The friendship of Azar, Hatef and Sabahi is attested in many of their poems in which they declare their admiration of and devotion to one another. Azar was at Kashan when the 1778 Kashan earthquake struck, in which he lost his brother and his house. Thus he was forced to move once again, most likely to Qom, where he died three years later in 1781.

== Literary career ==
=== Atashkadeh-ye Azar ===
Azar is principally known for his Persian anthology (tazkereh) of some 850 Persian-writing poets, the Atashkadeh-ye Azar ("Azar's Fire Temple"), which he started writing in 1760/1 and which is considered "the most important Persian anthology of the eighteenth century" by the Persian studies academic J.T.P. de Bruijn. Its chapter titles are based metaphorically on "fire". The Persian studies academic Jalal Matini explains that Azar chose such titles to underline his mission to defend Persian poetry as a member of the bazgasht-e adabi movement.

The book consists of two sections, both of which Azar called a majmareh (literally, "censer"). The first majmareh is further divided into one sholeh ("flame") on the poetry of kings, princes and amirs; three aḵgars ("embers") on the poets of Iran, Central Asia (Turan) and India (Hindustan); and one forūḡ ("light") consisting of an appendix dealing with female poets. The three aḵgars are divided further by geographical divisions into five, three and three sharārehs ("sparks") respectively, each one beginning with a brief description of the involved region. Azar's main reference for this part of the book was an anthology written by the Safavid-period poet Taqi ol-Din Kashani (died after 1607/8), known as the Kholāṣat ol-ashʿār ("The essence of the poems"). The second majmareh i.e. section consists of two partows ("beams")'. The first partow deals with the contemporaneous poets of Azar's own lifetime (some of whom were his friends), whereas the second partow consists of Azar's biography and a selection of his poetry.

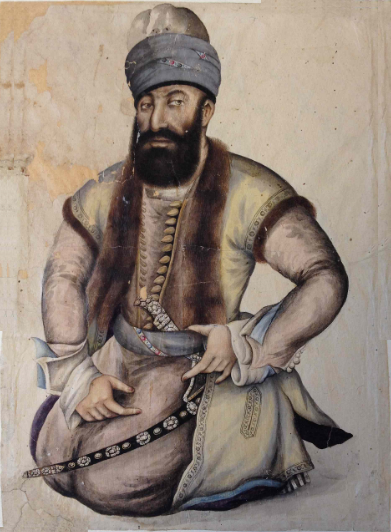
Azar dedicated the Atashkadeh-ye Azar to Karim Khan Zand (pictured)

All poets in the Atashkadeh-ye Azar are mentioned by their pen names, and the book is arranged in alphabetical order. All verses of each poet, which were incorporated into the book, were ordered according to the rhyme in question. The length of text he wrote about each poet varies; while a few received detailed biographies, for the most part, two or three lines were devoted to each poet, and he is equally sparing in the selections he chose from their oeuvres. Azar dedicated the Atashkadeh-ye Azar, completed shortly before his death, to Iranian ruler Karim Khan Zand. Although the work primarily deals with poets, it also contains information on the history of Iran since the Afghan invasion of 1722, a brief autobiography, and a selection of Azar's poems.

The prose of the Atashkadeh-ye Azar, although exhibiting some specific weaknesses frequently seen in 18th-century Persian literature, is mostly straightforward and articulate. The elaborate introduction to the account of contemporaneous poets incorporates several passages of poetic prose, which Matini describes as being well-written. For the passages in which contemporaneous poetic works are written, Azar's principle was apparently to provide first choice to those verses which he had heard himself directly from the poets in question; however, his claims, in his selection from earlier poets, that he had thoroughly studied the divans of those poets, is refuted through careful examination the earlier tazkerehs available to Azar.

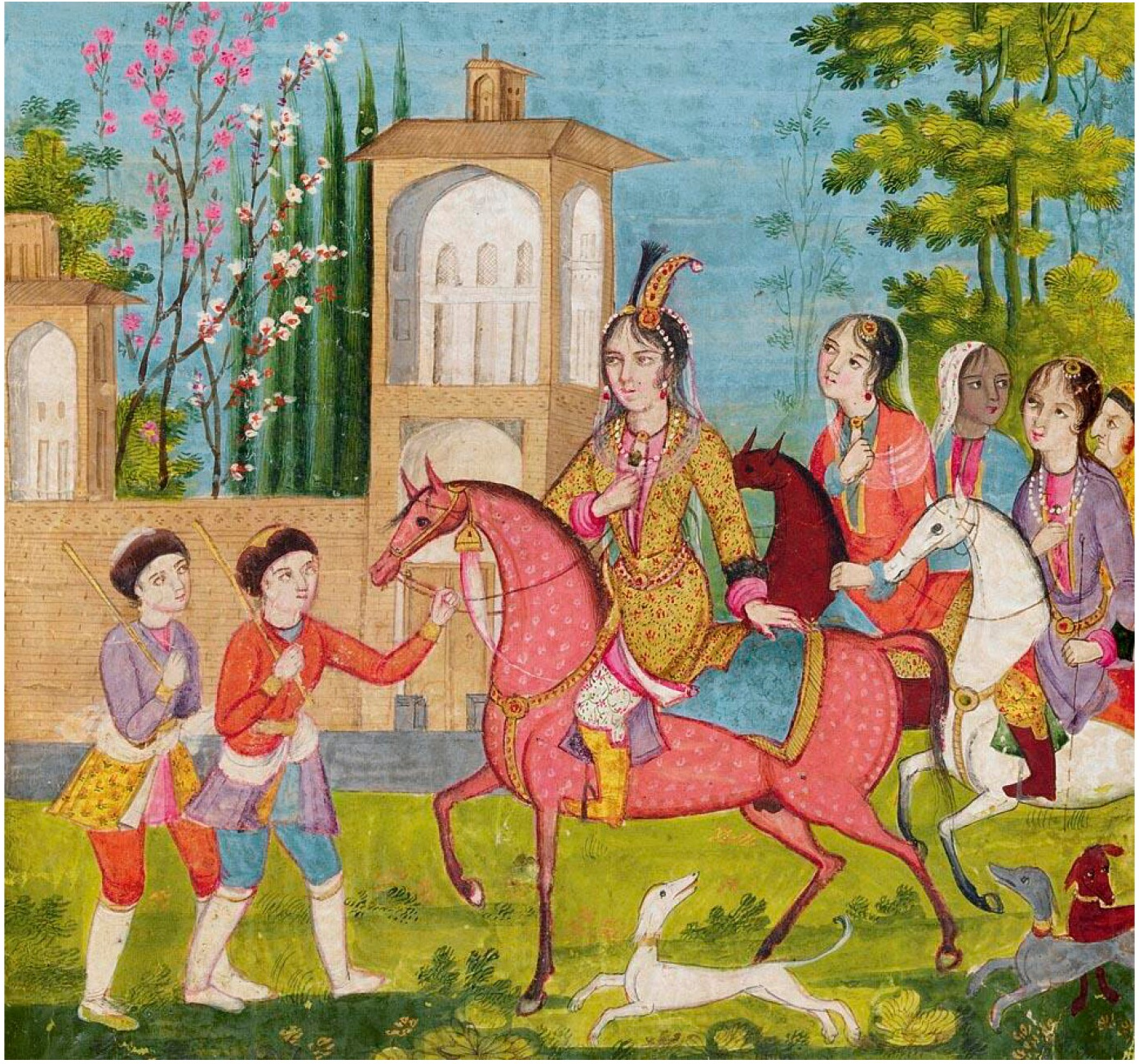
Miniature from a manuscript of the Atashkadeh-ye Azar. Copy made in Qajar Iran, dated 1801

Azar's Atashkadeh was often copied after it was written. It was lithographed on several occasions in 19th-century British India, starting from 1833/4. An account of the entire work was provided in 1843 by the Anglo-Irish scholar Nathaniel Bland. Bland published the first opening section on royal poets a year later in 1844 in London under the name The Atesh Kedah, or Fire-Temple. An abridgement of the Atashkadeh was written by Azar's brother Esḥāq Beg ʿUdhrī (died 1771/2) under the name Tazkereh-ye Eshaq, which only contains Azar's poems. The 1860/1 lithograph edition from Bombay (now Mumbai) was reprinted in Tehran, Iran's capital, in 1958. Hasan Sadat Nasiri's commentated printed edition of the Ataskadeh (4 vols., Tehran 1957–99) is still underway.

=== The bazgasht-e adabi ===
Azar's teacher, Mir Sayyed Ali Moshtaq Esfahani (c. 1689–1757), began a "literary return" movement (bazgasht-e adabi) to the stylistic standards of early Persian poetry. The Atashkadeh, like much other contemporary poetry from Isfahan and Shiraz, was an example of the bazgasht-e adabi, of which Azar was a leading figure. The movement rejected what was considered excessive "Indian style" (sabk-e Hendi) in Persian poetry and sought, according to the Iranologist Ehsan Yarshater, "a return to the simpler and more robust poetry of the old masters as against the effete and artificial verse into which Safavid poetry had degenerated". Due to his links with the basgasht-e adabi, Azar is very praiseworthy of authors who shunned the Indian style and attempted to bring back the locution of the early Persian poets. He is censorious of the Persian Saib Tabrizi (died 1676), one of the majors of "Indian style" Persian poetry, as well as his followers.

Azar praises his teacher, Mir Sayyed Ali Moshtaq Esfahani, in the Atashkadeh:

after he [i.e., Moshtāq] had broken the chain of verse that for years had been in the unworthy grip of poets of the past, with great effort and indescribable exertions he repaired it. Having destroyed for contemporary poets the foundation of versifying, he renewed the edifice of poetry built by the eloquent ancients.

The poetry that defined Azar was also influenced by his paternal uncle, Wali Mohammad Khan Bigdeli (died 1763).

After the disastrous 1778 Kashan earthquake, Azar (as well as Hatef and Sabahi) wrote poetry commemorating the event, in which they not only expressed their personal grief, but also sought to help the audience understand the disaster of the earthquake, as the Persian studies academic Matthew C. Smith explains, "within a meaningful historical and spiritual context, and to show the path forward". These particular poems, which provide insight into the bazgasht-e adabi movement "beyond mere imitation of earlier styles", underline the engagement of the members of the movement within Iran's social sphere at the time, and the relevance of their poetry to the contemporaneous audience. Azar (and Hatef) chose the tarkib-band, which is a stanzaic form often used for elegiac themes.

=== Other works ===
The Persian studies academics J.T.P. de Bruijn and Matini explain that, in addition to Azar's divan (collected poems of a particular author) comprising qasidehs (panegyrics), ghazals (short lyric poems of syntactically independent couplets), and qaṭʿehs (lyric poems on a single theme), four extant masnavis (poems in rhyming couplets on any theme) have been attributed to him: Yusof o Zolaykha (fragments appear in the Atashkadeh); Masnavi-e Azar, a short love poem mirroring Suz-u godaz ("Burning and Melting"), a poem by Agha Mohammad Sadeq Tafreshi which was popular in Azar's time; Saqi-nameh ("Book of the Cup-bearer"), and Moghanni-nameh ("Book of the Singer"). Azar may have also written the Ganjinat ol-haqq ("The Treasury of Truth", a work in the style of Saadi Shirazi's Golestan) and the Daftar-e noh aseman ("The Book of the Nine Skies"), an anthology of contemporary poetry.

== Sources ==
- de Bruijn, J.T.P. (2011). "Ādhar, Ḥājjī Luṭf ʿAlī Beg". In Fleet, Kate; Krämer, Gudrun; Matringe, Denis; Nawas, John; Rowson, Everett (eds.). Encyclopaedia of Islam (3rd ed.). Brill Online. ISSN 1873-9830.
- Doerfer, Gerhard (1989). "Bīgdelī". In Yarshater, Ehsan (ed.). Encyclopædia Iranica. Vol. IV/3: Bibliographies II–Bolbol I. London and New York: Routledge & Kegan Paul. pp. 251–252. ISBN 978-0-71009-126-0.
- Hanaway, William L. Jr. (1989). "Bāzgašt-e Adabī". In Yarshater, Ehsan (ed.). Encyclopædia Iranica. Vol. IV/1: Bāyju–Behruz. London and New York: Routledge & Kegan Paul. pp. 58–60. ISBN 978-0-71009-124-6.
- Matini, Jalal (1987). "Āẕar Bīgdelī". In Yarshater, Ehsan (ed.). Encyclopædia Iranica. Vol. III/2: Awāʾel al-maqālāt–Azerbaijan IV. London and New York: Routledge & Kegan Paul. p. 183. ISBN 978-0-71009-114-7.
- Parsinejad, Iraj (2003). A History of Literary Criticism in Iran, 1866–1951: Literary Criticism in the Works of Enlightened Thinkers of Iran--Akhundzadeh, Kermani, Malkom, Talebof, Maragheʼi, Kasravi, and Hedayat. Ibex Publishers, Inc. ISBN 978-1588140166.
- Sharma, Sunil (2021). "Local and Transregional Places in the Works of Safavid Men of Letters". In Melville, Charles (ed.). Safavid Persia in the Age of Empires: The Idea of Iran Vol. 10. I.B. Tauris. ISBN 978-0755633784.
- Smith, Matthew C. (2019). "Betrayed by Earth and Sky: Poetry of Disaster and Restoration in Eighteenth-Century Iran". Journal of Persianate Studies. 11 (2): 175–202. doi:10.1163/18747167-12341326. S2CID 150451074.
- Yarshater, Ehsan (1986). "Persian Poetry in the Timurid and Safavid Periods". In Lockhart, Laurence; Jackson, Peter (eds.). The Cambridge History of Iran: The Timurid and Safavid Periods. Vol. 6. Cambridge: Cambridge University Press. ISBN 0-521-20094-6.
