= Zia ol-Saltaneh =

Persian calligrapher and poet (1799–1873)

Zia ol-Saltaneh (Persian: ضیاء السلطنه, lit. 'Light of the Realm'; 1799–1873), also known as Shah Begum Khanum, was a Persian calligrapher and poet. The seventh most senior daughter of the second Qajar ruler of Iran, Fath-ʿAli Shah, she served as private secretary to her father. The name usually used for her, Ziaʾ ol-Saltaneh, meaning "Light of the Realm", was given to her by her father, and is an indication of his great love for her.

== Family ==
Zia ol-Saltaneh's mother was Maryam Khanom, 39th wife of Fath-ʿAli Shah. From a Jewish family from Mazandaran, she was first married to Agha Mohammad Khan, uncle of Fath-ʿAli Shah and first of the Qajar rulers.

Zia ol-Saltaneh had four full brothers, Mahmud Mirza, Homayun Mirza, Ahmad Ali Mirza, and Jahanshah Mirza, and one full sister, Sultan Begum. Later in life, she married Mirza Masoud Ansari Garmrudi, then Minister of Foreign Affairs to Fath-ʿAli Shah's successor, Mohammad Shah. She was not raised by her own mother, but by the Shah's mother, the Mahd-e ʿOlya ('the Sublime Cradle'), Asiyeh Khanum. On the death of her grandmother, she inherited all of her jewels and other precious items. Ziaʾ ol-Saltaneh would have four children of her own, including Shahanshah Begum (b. ca. 1836; also known as Agha Jan), a second daughter, Mirza Hasan Khan (b.1839), and Mirza Husayn Khan (b.1843). She lived outside of the harem in her own apartments, a situation indicative of her high status. She also had her own minister, Shaʿban-ʿAli Khan.

== Position at court ==
Zia ol-Saltaneh was involved in many significant aspects of the running of her father's court. It is clear that she was particularly involved in the economic life of the court. For example, it is reported that when the Shah wanted to bestow a gift upon one of his harem, Zia ol-Saltaneh would write to the Khazen al-Dowleh (State Treasurer), then Golbadan Baji, one of the wives of Fath-ʿAli, to report the gift, so that it could be properly recorded in the documentation of the treasury. There are records of anecdotes indicating that she shared the responsibility for the funds of the harem. For example, she was responsible for controlling the gambling funds of the princes — she would give them sums which they would have to pay back with interest. In addition to these responsibilities, as her father's favourite, she would organise his birthday celebrations, and every year on the occasion Fath-ʿAli would gift her a set of jewels. It is known that she owned property, which is suggestive of her personal wealth.

Perhaps most significantly, she acted as scribe for her father, with the title Munshi al-Mamalek-i Andarun, writing his personal letters for him. She also had control over the royal decrees issued from the harem. She was a highly skilled calligrapher, and produced a number of copies of the Qur'an, as well as other works such as collections of poetry, prayers, and pilgrimage texts. She was taught initially by her brother Maḥmud Mirza, but was later tutored by Mirza ʿAbbas Nuri (d.1839). In addition to her scribal duties, she would recite the poems sent to her father in his praise. She also seems to have been a patron of poetry, as the poet Rashha (b. circa 1783) composed poems in her praise.

Her brothers are reported to have had as much respect for her as her father did. Her half-brother ʿAbbas Mirza, Crown Prince until his death in 1833, wrote of her: 'My soul to yours, beloved Ziaʾ ol-Saltaneh,/ I have torn a hundred garments from grief/ At the thought of separation from you.' Her father also wrote verses in her honour, such as: 'Oh light of my eyes, Ziaʾ ol-Saltaneh,/ One day away from you/ Is like unto a year for me.' Fath-Ali Khan Saba, the chief court poet, also wrote lines in her praise: 'Your moon, Shāh Baygum, from whose face and hair/ The morn of dominion is perfumed, and the king of the realm illumined.' It is clear that her brothers and other members of the court were aware of her influence with the Shah, and she would often be called upon to intercede for other members of the court.

During the reign of Mohammad Shah, she continued some of her duties associated with the fiscal running of the court, and was one of the few relatives of the new Shah allowed to sit in his presence.

== Poetry ==
As well as reciting the poetry of others, writing down that composed by her father, and acting as a patron, Zia ol-Saltaneh also composed her own verses. Her poetry was recorded by her brother Mahmud Mirza in his anthology of women poets, compiled in 1825, at the behest of Ziaʾ al-Saltaneh herself. For example:

'Even though I am the daughter of the Shah/ And my crown reaches to the moon from pride/ And all that I wish for is provided /In the way of carpets and clothes, jewels and gold/ Horses and camels; female and male servants/ As well as flocks, herds, and livestock,/ And I have abundant jewelry/ So much that it cannot be counted,/ I have not bound my heart to any of these things,/ For it is very difficult to detach one’s heart!'

The 'bold, didactic tone' of these verses has been described as 'indicative of the princess's confident self-perception, erudition, and her political and economic power.'

== Marriage ==
Zia ol-Saltaneh did not marry during her father's lifetime. It is said that she refused all suitors. It has been suggested that she married Mirza ʿAbbas Nuri, only to divorce him soon after. This was said to have been a plot formed with Ḥaji Mirza ʿAbbas Aqasi to ruin Mirza ʿAbbas Nuri financially, but it has been noted that there is not sufficient evidence to support this claim. She was engaged briefly to her paternal cousin, Ḥosaynqoli Khan, son of Fatḥ-ʿAli Shah's brother of the same name. The author of the Qisas al-ʿUlama reports that Fath-ʿAli attempted to give her in marriage to a number of significant members of the clergy who all refused.

Following the death of her father, she asked the new Shah, her nephew, Muhammad, to allow her to remain unmarried. However, she is also reported to have travelled to the shrine cities of Iraq (al-ʿAtabat al-ʿAliyat) shortly after Fath-ʿAli's death. While there she corresponded with a number of clerics, including Aqa Seyyed Mehdi, the son of Aqa Seyyed ʿAli Tabatabai, and Shaykh Muhammad Husayn Saheb-e Fosul, with proposals of marriage, but she was refused a number of times.

At the age of 37, in 1835, Mohammad Shah insisted, on pain of execution, that she agree to marry Mirza Masoud (1790–1848), then Minister of Foreign Affairs.

== Death and burial ==
Later in her life, Zia ol-Saltaneh moved to the city of Najaf in Iraq. She died in the nearby shrine city of Karbalaʾ where she also owned property. She was buried in one of the rooms of her house there, which is now incorporated into the shrine of Imam Husayn.

== See also ==
- Women in Islam
