= Saib Tabrizi =

Iranian poet (1789–1846)

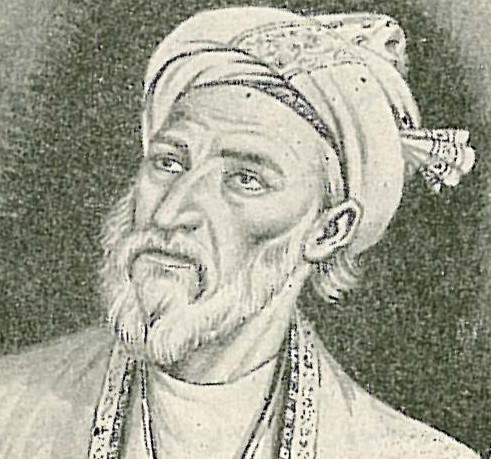
- Drawing of Saib Tabrizi by Abbas Rassam Arjangi, dated 1960/61
- Born: Mirza Mohammad Ali c. 1592; Tabriz, Safavid Iran
- Died: 1676 (aged 83–84); Isfahan, Safavid Iran
- Resting place: Saeb Mausoleum, Isfahan
- Occupation: Poet
- Writing career
- Movement: Indian style

Saib Tabrizi (Persian: صائب تبریزی, romanized: Ṣāʾib Tabrīzī, میرزا محمّدعلی صائب تبریزی, Mīrzā Muḥammad ʿalī Ṣāʾib, Azerbaijani: صائب تبریزی) was an Iranian poet, regarded as one of the greatest masters of a form of classical Persian lyric poetry characterized by rhymed couplets, known as the ghazal. He also established the "Indian style" (sabk-i Hind) in the literature of his native language, Azerbaijani, in which he is known to have written 17 ghazals and molammaʿs.

Saib was born in Tabriz, and educated in Isfahan and at some time around 1626, he traveled to India, where he was received into the court of Shah Jahan. He stayed for a time in Kabul and in Kashmir, returning home after several years abroad. After his return, the emperor of Persia, Shah Abbas II, bestowed upon him the title King of Poets.

Saib's reputation is based primarily on some 300,000 couplets, including his epic poem Qandahār-nāma (“The Campaign Against Qandahār”). (The city of Qandahār or Kandahar in today's Afghanistan was in Saib Tabrizi's lifetime a long-standing bone of contention between the Mughal rulers of India and the Safavid rulers of Persia - both of whom were at different times the poet's patrons - until definitely given over to Persian rule as a result of the Mughal–Safavid war of 1649–53.)

Saib Tabrizi's “Indian style” verses reveal an elegant wit, a gift for the aphorism and the proverb, and a keen appreciation of philosophical and intellectual exercise. Saib was especially well known for his Persian panegyric poetry during the reigns of Persian Emperors Safi, Abbas II and Suleiman.

== Biography ==
=== Early life ===
Saib Tabrizi was either of Persian or Azerbaijani ancestry, with Azerbaijani as his native tongue. Saib's birth date is uncertain; he was most likely born at the end of the 16th-century, as he mentions his age being eighty in one of his poems. The Iranologist Paul E. Losensky puts his birth date in c. 1592. Saib was born with the name Mirza Mohammad Ali in the city of Tabriz in Safavid Iran. The city was a provincial capital of the Azerbaijan province and had served as the capital of the country until 1555. Saib's father was the wealthy and prominent merchant Mirza Abd-al-Rahim, while his paternal uncle was Shams-al-Din of Tabriz was skilled in calligraphy, for which he received the nickname Shirin Qalam ("Sweet Pen").

As a result of attacks by the Ottoman Empire, many families, including that of Saibs, were evacuated from Tabriz by Shah Abbas I, who moved them to the Abbasabad neighbourhood in Isfahan. It was in this location that Saib spent his childhood. He received his education at home and started engaging in poetry exercises when he was a little child. Although some recent sources have disputed this, he was reportedly trained in poetry by both Masih Kashani and Shifa'i Isfahani. In his youth, he made pilgrimages to Mecca, the Imam Reza shrine in Mashhad, and the Shia shrines in Najaf and Karbala.

=== Travels abroad ===
Saib believed that the best opportunities to advance his literary career were at the Mughal courts in India, as were the beliefs of many other ambitious Iranian poets of the time. In 1624/25, he immigrated to the Mughal realm, where he became acquainted with the young governor of Kabul, Mirza Ahsan-Allah Zafar Khan. The latter also wrote poetry, and became the main patron of Saib, who became his teacher in poetry. Saib accompanied Zafar Khan and his father on military campaigns in the Deccan Plateau, before returning to Isfahan in 1632.

=== Return to Iran ===
Saib spent the remainder of his life in Isfahan, leaving the city only to visit other Iranian cities. His seven years spent living in India contributed to his reputation as the greatest poet of his time. He maintained a relationship with the Safavid courts and dedicated poems Abbas II and Shah Soleyman III. Abbas II appointed Saib to the post of poet laureate.

Saib seems to have withdrawn from the public eye in his final years, only receiving a small number of students and literary supporters from all around the Persian-speaking world. He died in 1676 and was buried in a garden retreat in Isfahan.

== Poetry ==
In his poetry, Saib portrayed the Safavid shahs of his era as leaders of the Safavid order, supporters of Twelver Shia Islam, descendants of Ali and the Islamic prophet Muhammad, protectors of Iran against the Ottomans and Uzbeks, the Shadows of Allah, and maintainers of security and justice.

He developed a method which was called Indian method. Tabrizi is also credited with establishing the "Indian style" (sabk-i Hind) of Azerbaijani əruz poetry (poetry using quantifying prosody).

== Legacy and assessment ==
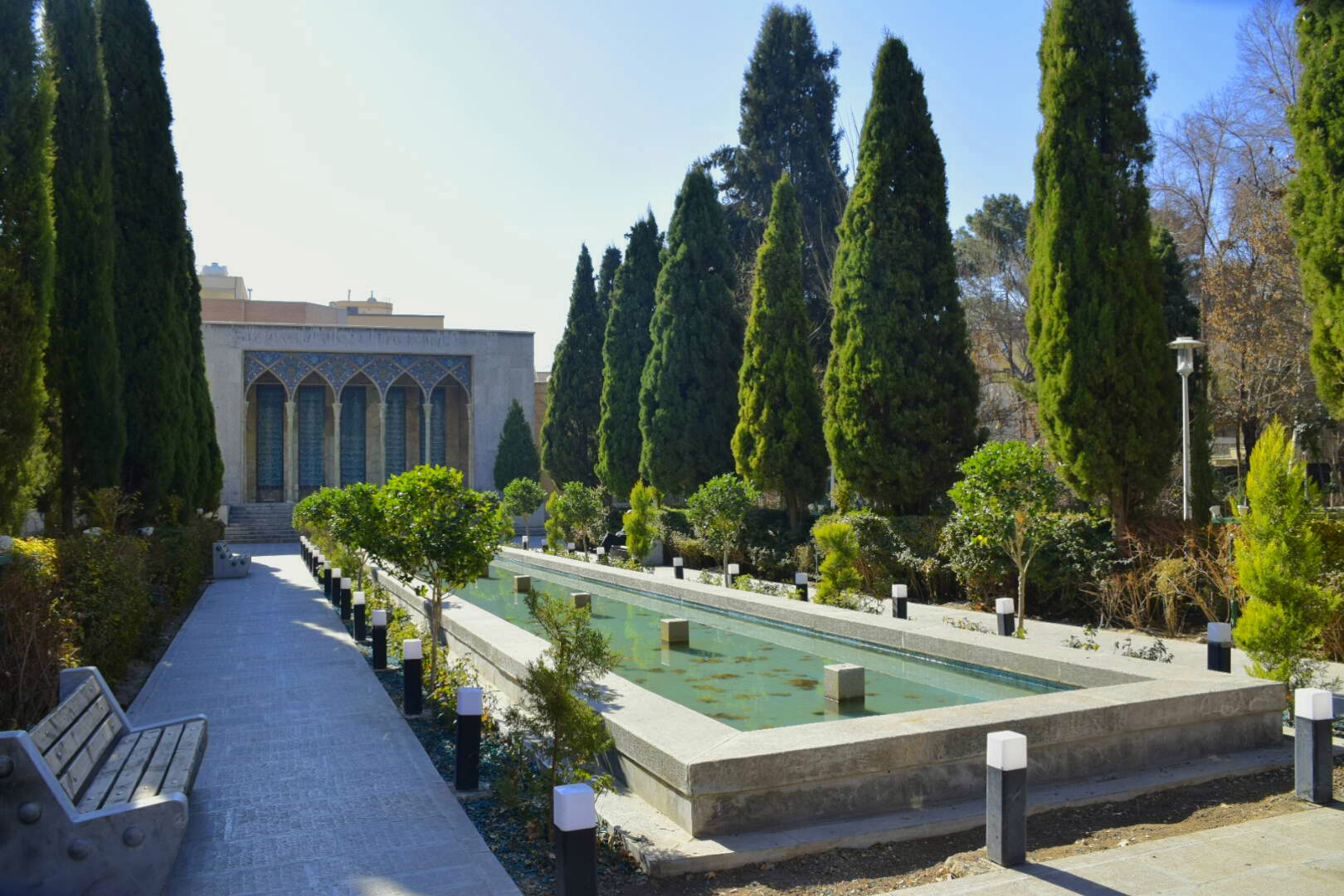
The mausoleum of Saib in Isfahan

Biographical literature is abundant with references to the admiration of Saib by both his contemporary and later readers. When discussing Saib, his contemporary Mohammad Taher Nasrabadi mentions that "the sublimity of his genius and extent of his fame need no description." A few years later, in India, Sarkhosh writes that Saib's "jewel-like verses have broadcast his fame throughout the world," and that the Safavid shahs gifted copies of his divan (collection of poems) to leaders in other Islamic nations. The Central Asian poet and biographer Maliha of Samarqand provides an emotional description of his visit to Saib's tomb and the night he spent there. The admiration for Saib's literary accomplishment persisted in most Persian-speaking regions throughout the 19th-century, and according to Losensky; "reaching perhaps its fullest expression in the writings of Azad Bilgrami in Sarv-e azad and Khezana-ye amera."

However, this later changed in Iran with the rise of the neo-classical bazgasht-e adabi ("literary return") in the late 18th-century. Like most new literary movements, it partially formed its identity by opposing the ideals of its recent forebears. One of its supporters, Azar Bigdeli, accused Saib of "losing track of the established rules of previous masters” and causing poetry to go in a downward spiral. By the middle of the 19th-century, Reza-Qoli Khan Hedayat was able to simply state that Saib used "a strange style that is not now approved." In Persian literary circles, this general rejection persisted as an integral belief through the first decades in the early 20th-century. However, Saib and 17th-century poetry as a whole started to be reassessed when the bazgasht-e adabi itself came into disregard with the collapse of the Qajar government and the start of modernity.

The works of the literary historian Zeyn-al-Abedin Mo'taman and the poet-scholar Seyed Karim Amiri Firuzkuhi in the 1940s and 1950s were particularly noteworthy in revival of Saib's reputation. In January 1976, the University of Tehran hosted a conference where various leading writers gathered, and which led to the recognition of Saib as a major classical poet.

A line from Saib's poem on Kabul provided the title for Khaled Hosseini's 2007 novel, A Thousand Splendid Suns.

== See also ==
- Saeb Mausoleum
- Saadi Shirazi
- Hafez

== Sources ==
- Floor, Willem (2008). Titles and Emoluments in Safavid Iran: A Third Manual of Safavid Administration, by Mirza Naqi Nasiri. Mage Publishers. ISBN 978-1933823232.
- Javadi, H.; Burrill, K. (1988). "Azerbaijan x. Azeri Turkish Literature". In Yarshater, Ehsan (ed.). Encyclopædia Iranica. Vol. III/3: Azerbaijan IV–Bačča(-ye) Saqqā. London and New York: Routledge & Kegan Paul. pp. 251–255. ISBN 978-0-71009-115-4.
- Losensky, Paul E. (2003). "Ṣāʾeb Tabrizi". Encyclopaedia Iranica.
- Newman, Andrew J. (2008). Safavid Iran: Rebirth of a Persian Empire. I.B. Tauris. ISBN 978-0857716613.
- Rahman, Munibur (1995). "Ṣāʾib". In Bosworth, C. E.; van Donzel, E.; Heinrichs, W. P. & Lecomte, G. (eds.). The Encyclopaedia of Islam, Second Edition. Volume VIII: Ned–Sam. Leiden: E. J. Brill. ISBN 978-90-04-09834-3.
