= Shifa'i Isfahani =

Iranian poet (1500s–1628)

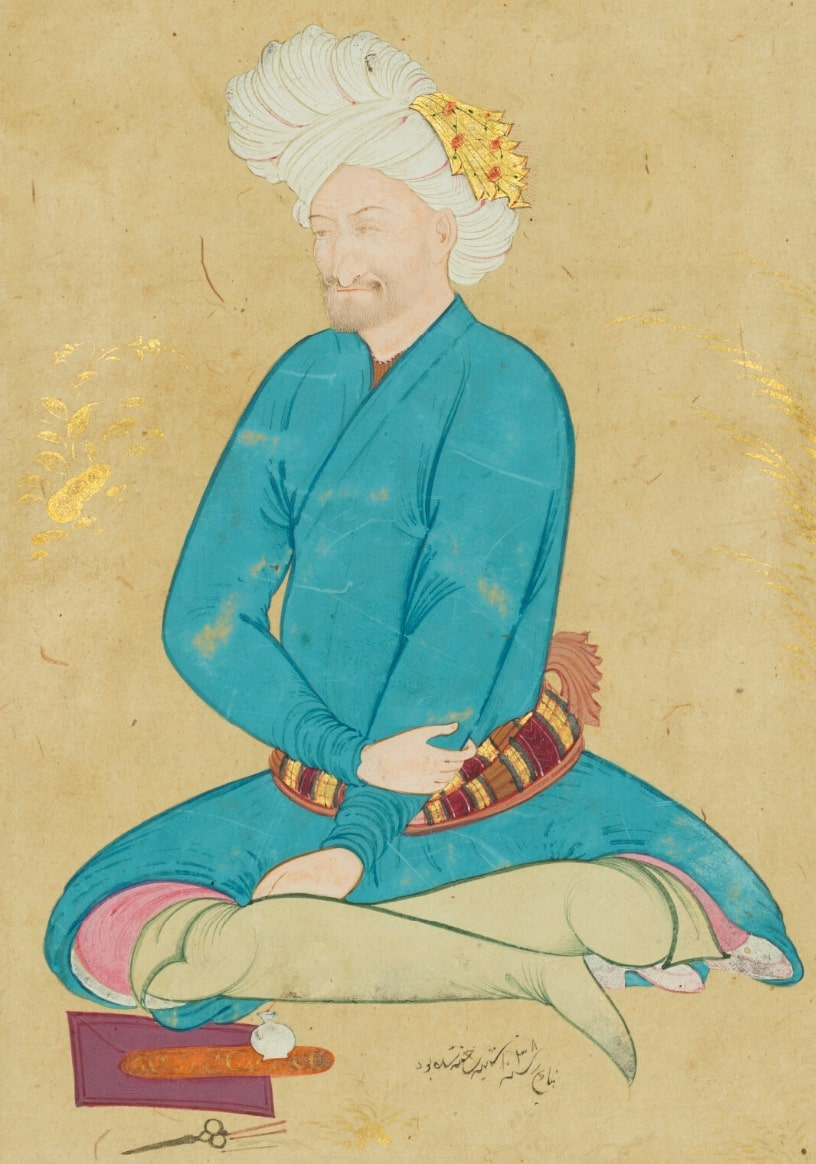
- Portrait of Shifa'i Isfahani by Reza Abbasi, dated 1628 or 1629
- Born: 1549 or 1558/59 Isfahan, Safavid Iran
- Died: 9 May 1628 Isfahan, Safavid Iran
- Resting place: Karbala
- Occupation: Physician, poet
- Language: Persian
- Notable works: Namakdan-e haqiqat Didar-e bidar Mehr o Mohabbat; Majma al-bahrayn

Shifa'i Isfahani (also spelled Shafaei; Persian: شفایی اصفهانی; 1549 or 1558/59 – 9 May 1628) was a physician and poet in 16th and 17th century Safavid Iran, as well as the poet laureate of Shah Abbas I (r. 1587–1629). The didactic masnavi Namakdan-e haqiqat is considered his best work, made to resemble the Hadiqat al-Haqiqa by Sanai. Although writers of Shifa'i's era criticised his harsh and frequently sarcastic humor, they considered him as one of the greatest poets of his era.

Due to his strong patriotism, Shifa'i criticized Iranians migrating to India, a common trend at the time. He wrote in more different styles than his peers, including the Indian style (also known as the Isfahani or Safavid style), which was common at the time in both India and Iran.

== Background ==
A native of Isfahan, Shifa'i was born in 1549 or 1558/59 to a family of physicians. His father Hakim Mulla had studied under the scholar Ghyath al-Din Mansur Dashtaki and worked as a physician in the Jameh Mosque of Isfahan. Under his father and eventually his brother, Hakim Naser, Shifa'i studied medicine and other scientific subjects. He also studied mysticism, but was best known for his poetry, which he saw as a hobby and a way to be creative. His main source of income was from his work as a physician.

== Career ==
Shifa'i wrote his ghazals in the style of Baba Fighani Shirazi, and sometimes Hafez and Saadi Shirazi. His qasidas were based on the style of Khaqani. He also composed masnavi poetry, as well as other styles. The didactic masnavi Namakdan-e haqiqat is considered his best work. It was intended to resemble the Hadiqat al-Haqiqa by Sanai, who is sometimes wrongly credited as its author. He also wrote three other masnavis, the Didar-e bidar and Mehr o Mohabbat (or Mohabbatnameh), inspired by the Makhzan ol-Asrar and Khosrow and Shirin of Nizami Ganjavi, respectively. The third one was the Majma al-bahrayn (or Matla al-anwar), inspired by the Tuhfat al-Iraqayn of Khaqani. He was also the author of a saqi-nameh (Note: Saqi-nameh is a genre in Persian poetry in which the narrator calls on the cupbearer for wine and a singer for music, using them to ease suffering.), which was published by Ahmad Golchin Ma'ani at Tehran in 1961. A collection of Shifa'i's poems, around 5,000 bayts, had been transported to India during his lifetime. In 1630/31, Mirza Mohammad Taqi Dawlatabadi put together a detailed collection of Shifa'i's poems which was around 20,000 bayts.

During Shifa'i's lifetime, it was common for Iranians to migrate to India, a trend he criticized due to his strong patriotism. Despite the language and imagery used in his ghazals lacking the exaggerations shown in the Indian style, they are still considered to be a part of that tradition. The Indian style, a name coined because it was most visible in Persian literature produced in India, was also common at the Safavid court during the 17th and early 18th centuries, and has therefore been referred to as the Isfahani or Safavid style. Besides the Indian style, Shifa'i wrote in a greater variety of styles than his peers, as he was well-versed in the works of many leading Persian poets, some of whose poems he had written responses to.

Shifa'i was a companion, physician and poet laureate of Shah Abbas I (r. 1587–1629), who highly valued him, granting him the honorific title of malik al-shu'arā wa mumtāz-i Īrān ("King of poets and Iran's excellence"). Despite his status as poet laureate, Shifa'i never mentioned his status in his poems, nor did he act like a typical court poet who sought favour with the ruling elite. Regardless, he showed proper etiquette toward the court. For example, he went to the Mazandaran province after being invited by Shah Abbas I, where he praised the latter for his work in Farahabad. Although writers of Shifa'i's era criticised his harsh and frequently sarcastic humor, they considered him as one of the greatest poets of his era. Shifa'i apologized to Shah Abbas I for his satire in a brief poem, stating that it was an integral part of who he was, "just as one cannot wash away from amber the attraction of straw." Shifa'i's satirical remarks were not necessarily meant to be hostile, as he and Ohadi Balyani, would write harsh satires about each other, and still remain close friends and travel companions. Shifa'i maintained a close relationship with Shah Abbas I's son-in-law, the poet Asir-e Esfahani, because of his cheerful and sometimes unrestrained behavior. Shifa'i was also close to the writer Fasihi Ansari.

Although some recent sources have disputed this, Shifa'i and Masih Kashani were reportedly the teachers of the prominent 17th-century poet Saib Tabrizi. Other students of Shifa'i were Fazli Jarbazaqani, Tabi Qazvini, Mulla Afzal Hemmati, and Baqia Musannif. Shifa'i spent most of his life in Isfahan, where he died on 9 May 1628, being subsequently buried in Karbala. He had a son named Mohammad Raqib, who was also a physician.

Some sources have confused Shifa'i Isfahani with Mozaffar ibn Mohammad Hosseini Shifa'i Kashani Isfahani, another prominent Safavid-era physician and the author of the Qarabadin.

== Sources ==
- de Bruijn, J.T.P. (1995). "Sabk-i, Hindī". In Bosworth, C. E.; van Donzel, E.; Heinrichs, W. P. & Lecomte, G. (eds.). The Encyclopaedia of Islam, Second Edition. Volume VIII: Ned–Sam. Leiden: E. J. Brill. ISBN 978-90-04-09834-3.
- de Bruijn, J.T.P. (1997). "S̲h̲ifāʾī Iṣfahānī". In Bosworth, C. E.; van Donzel, E.; Heinrichs, W. P. & Lecomte, G. (eds.). The Encyclopaedia of Islam, Second Edition. Volume IX: San–Sze. Leiden: E. J. Brill. ISBN 978-90-04-10422-8.
- Losensky, Paul E. (2009). "Sāqi-nāma". In Yarshater, Ehsan (ed.). Encyclopædia Iranica (Online ed.). Encyclopædia Iranica Foundation. ISBN 978-9004417090.
- Rahman, Munibur (1995). "Ṣāʾib". In Bosworth, C. E.; van Donzel, E.; Heinrichs, W. P. & Lecomte, G. (eds.). The Encyclopaedia of Islam, Second Edition. Volume VIII: Ned–Sam. Leiden: E. J. Brill. ISBN 978-90-04-09834-3.
- Rypka, Jan (1968). History of Iranian Literature. Springer Netherlands. ISBN 978-9401034814.
- Shafieioun, Saeed (2009). "Shafaei Isfahanis status in Hindi (Indian) style". Research on Mystical Literature (in Persian). 3 (3): 109–130.
