= Vesal Shirazi =

Iranian poet (1782 – 1845)

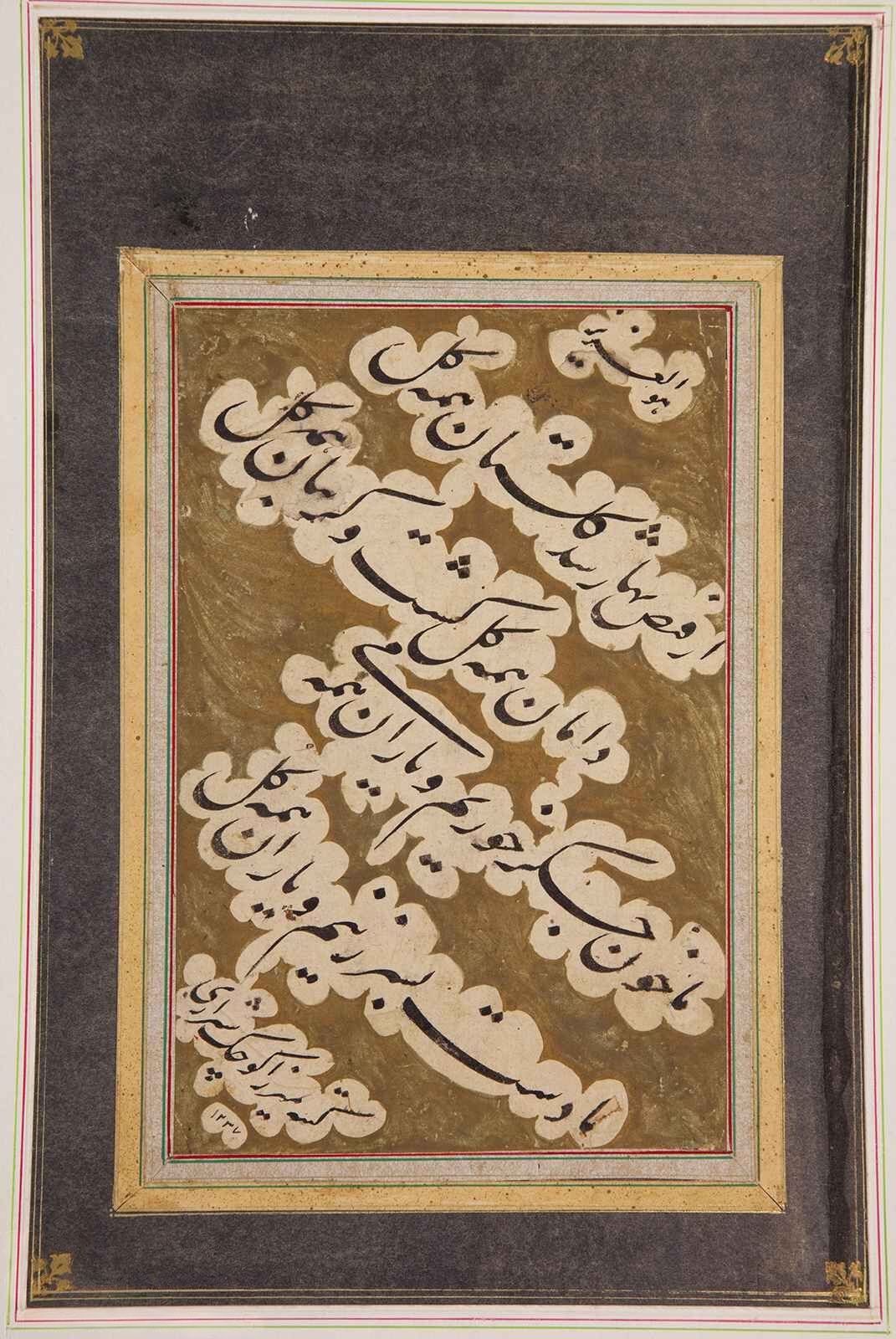
- Persian calligraphy by Vesal Shirazi, dated 1821
- Born: 1782; Shiraz, Zand Iran
- Died: 1845 (aged 62–63); Qajar Iran
- Resting place: Near Shah Cheragh, Shiraz
- Occupation: Poet
- Children: Mirza Mohammad Davari Shirazi
- Writing career
- Language: Persian
- Literary movement: Bazgasht-e adabi

Vesal Shirazi (Persian: وصال شیرازی; 1782 – 1845) was an Iranian poet, who wrote in the style of Bazgasht-e adabi, which advocated for the return of the Khorasani and Iraqi styles in Persian literature.

Some historians consider him to have been the most prominent poet under Fath-Ali Shah Qajar (r. 1797–1834).

== Sources ==
- de Bruijn, J.T.P. (2002). "Wiṣāl". In Bearman, P. J.; Bianquis, Th.; Bosworth, C. E.; van Donzel, E. & Heinrichs, W. P. (eds.). The Encyclopaedia of Islam, Second Edition. Volume XI: W–Z. Leiden: E. J. Brill. ISBN 978-90-04-12756-2.
- Daadbeh, Asghar (2015). "Bāzgasht-i Adabī". In Madelung, Wilferd; Daftary, Farhad (eds.). Encyclopaedia Islamica Online. Brill Online. ISSN 1875-9831.
- Hanaway, William L. (1989). "Bāzgašt-e adabī". In Yarshater, Ehsan (ed.). Encyclopædia Iranica. Vol. IV/1: Bāyju–Behruz. London and New York: Routledge & Kegan Paul. pp. 58–60. ISBN 978-0-71009-124-6.
- Katouzian, Homa (2013). Iran: Politics, History and Literature. Routledge. ISBN 978-0415636902.
