= Ashofteh Erivani =

Ashofteh Erivani (Persian: آشفته ایروانی) was an Iranian poet who was active in the second half of the 19th century. He was born in Erivan (Yerevan), whose Shaykh al-Islam was his uncle Haji Molla Mohammad. Ashofteh had come to Tehran as a young adult to work as an attendant for Ali Mirza Zel as-Soltan, the son of the Qajar shah (king) of Iran, Fath-Ali Shah Qajar (r. 1797–1834). Being well read, Ashtofteh knew much about the history of the shahs. He was regarded as a kind person with many virtues by his contemporary Shamluye Khorasani.

His divan (collection of poems) remain undiscovered. His poetry appears largely to have been ghazals, based on the few instances that can be found in biographical anthologies. His poetry displays unusual themes and his ghazals bear a resemblance to the Indian style in Persian poetry.

== Sources ==
- Shoar, Jafar (2018). "آشفته ایروانی". The Great Islamic Encyclopaedia (in Persian).
