= 1823 in Iran =

- Decades
- See also: Other events of 1823; Years in Iran

The following lists events that happened during 1823 in Qajar era.

== Incumbents ==
- Monarch: Fath-Ali Shah Qajar

== Births ==
- ? – Muhammad Baqir Sharif Tabatabae, Iranian Islamic scholar.
- ? – Parviz Mirza (Qajar prince), Iranian Qajar-era prince.
