= Asheq Esfahani =

18th-century iranian poet

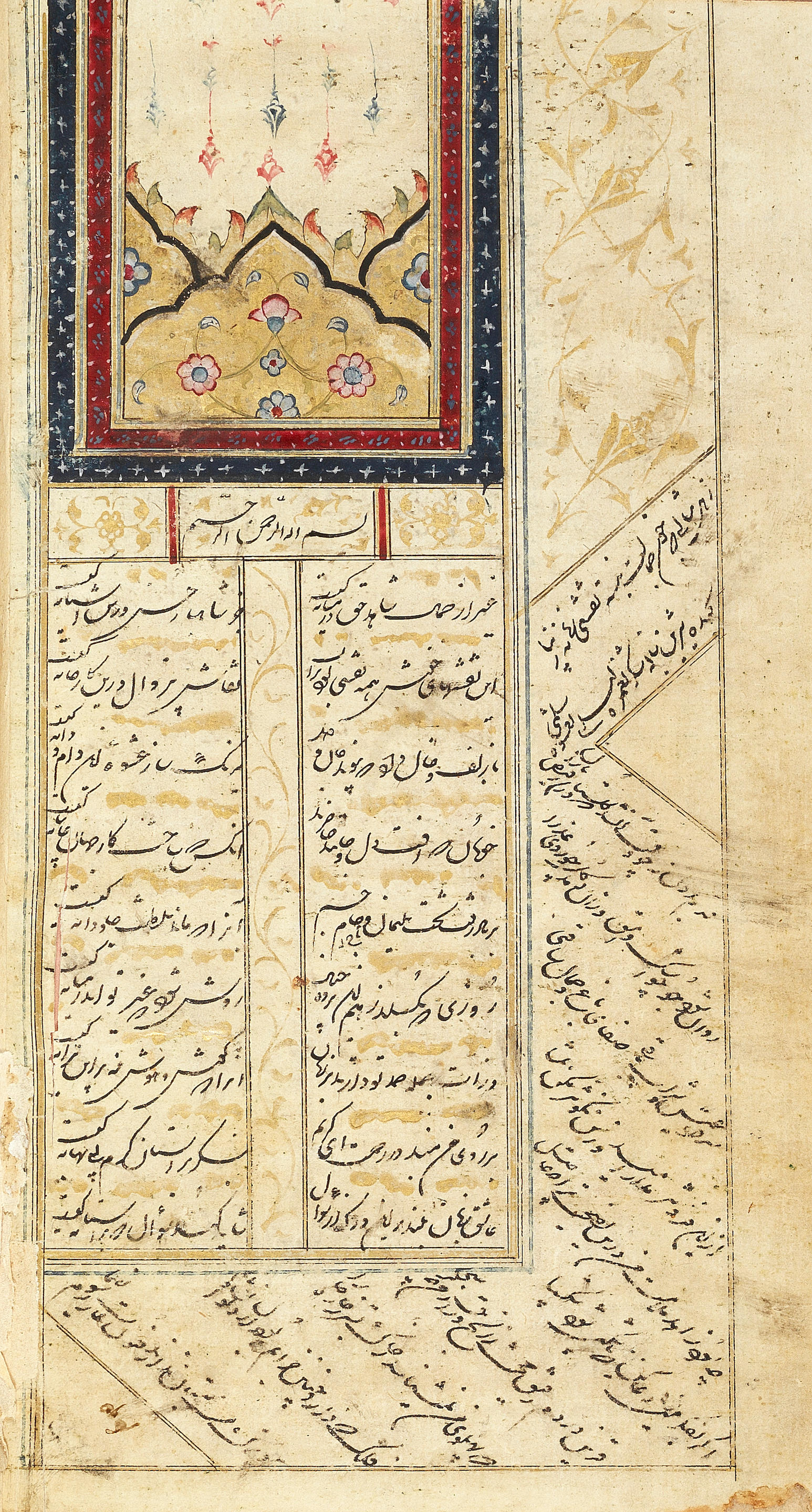
- Page of a manuscript of the divan of Asheq Esfahani, dated 1761 or 1762
- Born: Agha Mohammad Khayyat c. 1700 Safavid Iran
- Died: 1768 (aged 67–68) Isfahan, Zand Iran
- Occupation: Poet
- Language: Persian
- Literary movement: Bazgasht-e adabi

Asheq Esfahani (Persian: عاشق اصفهانی) was an 18th-century poet who was part of the literary movement Bazgasht-e adabi, which advocated for a return to the fundamentals of classical Persian poetry in protest against the excessively "unnatural" nature of the Indian style that dominated poetry in Iran and Persian-speaking India.

He was born in c. 1700, and died in 1768 in Isfahan.

== Sources ==
- Firuzkuhi, K. Amiri (1987). "ʿĀšeq Eṣfahānī". Encyclopaedia Iranica.
- Meneghini, Daniela (2017). "Hātif Iṣfahānī". In Fleet, Kate; Krämer, Gudrun; Matringe, Denis; Nawas, John; Rowson, Everett (eds.). Encyclopaedia of Islam (3rd ed.). Brill Online. ISSN 1873-9830.
- Seyed-Gohrab, Ali Asghar (2017). "ʿĀshiq Iṣfahānī". In Fleet, Kate; Krämer, Gudrun; Matringe, Denis; Nawas, John; Rowson, Everett (eds.). Encyclopaedia of Islam (3rd ed.). Brill Online. ISSN 1873-9830.
