= Asir-e Esfahani =

17th-century Persian poet

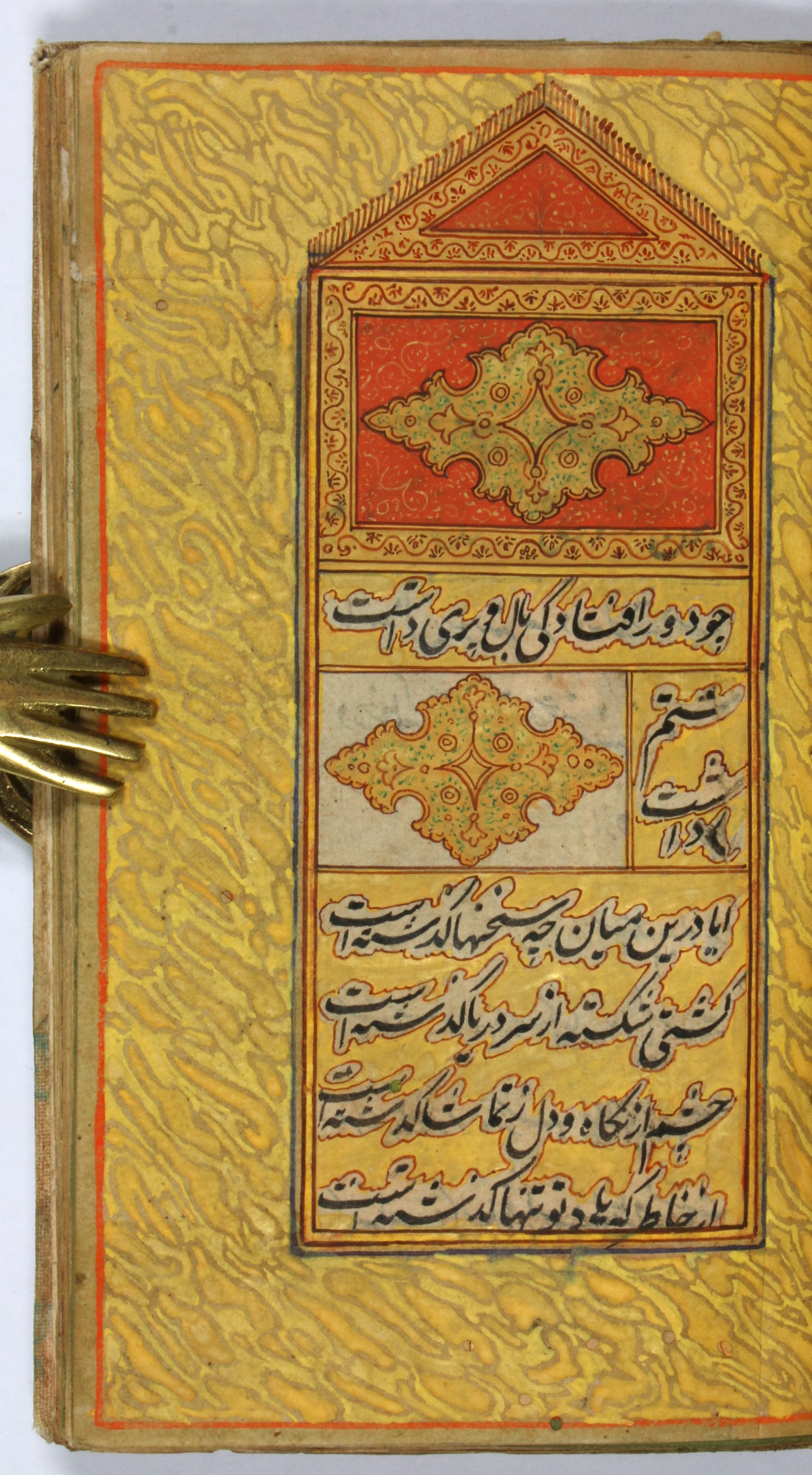
19th-century Indian copy of Asir's divan

Mirza Jalal Mohammad (c. 1620-48), who is best known as Asir-e Esfahani (Asir) and Shahrestani, was a poet in 17th-century Safavid Iran. He was an innovative writer whose oeuvre contains examples of all conventional Persian poetic forms, a grandee at court and a son-in-law of Shah ("King") Abbas the Great (r. 1588-1629).

== Biography ==
Few details about Asir's life are known. Of Persian stock, he was born to Mirza ibn Mo'men in the city Isfahan, Safavid Iran. His family were reputable sayyeds (Note: Persons claiming descent from the Islamic prophet Mohammad.) from Shahrestan, a district in eastern Isfahan. Asir's marriage to Malek Nisa Begum, a daughter of Safavid Shah ("King") Abbas the Great (r. 1588-1629) cemented the family's high socio-economic status. Thereafter, Asir's home became a focal point of Isfahan's lively literary scene. Asir studied under the poet Fasihi Heravi (died 1639-40) and was in contact with other prominent, contemporaneous poets such as Salek Qazvini (died 1674) and Saib Tabrizi (died 1676), with whom he often exchanged ghazals (short, lyrical poems consisting of rhyming couplets). Asir's literary output was praised by Kalim Kashani, the Persian poet from Hamadan who flourished in Mughal India, providing evidence Asir's work travelled to India during his own lifetime, even though he did not.

Although wine was commonly drunk in Safavid Iran, according to one of Asir's earliest biographers Mohammad Taher Nasrabadi (c. 1618-79), who was a frequent guest at Asir's house, Asir was addicted to alcohol, which caused his early death. According to the third edition of the Encyclopedia of Islam, dates for Asir's death diverge widely from 1630/1 to 1658/9. The earliest authority on Asir, the Safavid historian Vali Qoli Beg (died after 1674), gives the year 1648, which accords well with other known facts of Asir's life.

His pen name "Asir" means "prisoner". Further narrating about this name, the Encyclopedia Iranica adds:

According to Mohammad-Ali Tarbiat, Mirza Jalal was imprisoned by Shah Safi, along with some of the royal kinsfolk in 1042/1633, and thus he adopted the penname Asir (Prisoner). No evidence has been produced for this. Moreover, no change of pen-name has been found in any of his writings. His pen-name was certainly Asir throughout his career, and his purported imprisonment is probably a myth based on the meaning of the word asir.

== Literary output ==
Asir's extant works contain examples of all conventional Persian poetic forms. His qasidas (panegyrics), tarji-bands and tarkib-bands (strophic poems with and without a refrain, respectively) eulogise the Shia Imams and several of his qit'as (lyrical poems on a single theme) celebrate events that happened during the reign of Shah Safi (r. 1629-1642). Asir alo wrote rubaiyat (quatrains) and several short masnavis (poems in rhyming couplets on any theme). Asir, however, is best known for around a thousand ghazals and ghazal fragments that make up the bulk of his divan (collected poems). These are mostly amatory in theme and are notable for their sophisticated used of poetic imagery.

Asir was referred to by several anthologists and biographers as the creator of the so-called "Indian style" (sabk-e Hendi) in Persian poetry. This notion apparently stemmed from the compliments Saib Tabrizi, known as the greatest poet of the "Indian style", paid to Asir by referring to himself as an imitator of Asir's poetry. In Shir Ali Khan Ludi's Mer'āt-ol-khayāl ("Mirror of the imagination") (1691), Asir is referred to as "the founder of khiyal-bandi"—the creation of fanciful, imagistic conceits, a defining feature of the "Indian style" (sabk-e Hendi) in Persian poetry.

The early critic Nasrabadi qualified his praise of Asir by noting the unevenness of his output. The later biographer Walih Daghistani (died 1756/7) said some of Asir's verses "descended into the valley of inanity" and set a reprehensible precedent. Nevertheless, according to the Encyclopedia of Islam, Daghistani acknowledged Asir's good verses were very good and the modern literary historian Zabihollah Safa demonstrates the wealth of meaning Asir at his best could concentrate into a single verse. A critical edition of the ghazals by Sharifi Wildani examines these conflicting claims.

== Sources ==
- Fīrūzkūhī, K. Amīrī (1987). "ASĪR EṢFAHĀNĪ". Encyclopaedia Iranica, Vol. II, Fasc. 7. pp. 765–766.
- Losensky, Paul E. (2009). "Asīr-i Iṣfahānī". In Fleet, Kate; Krämer, Gudrun; Matringe, Denis; Nawas, John; Rowson, Everett (eds.). Encyclopaedia of Islam (3rd ed.). Brill Online. ISSN 1873-9830.
