= Ahmad Ali Mirza Qajar =

Qajar prince (1804–1852)

Ahmad Ali Mirza احمدعلی میرزا
- Prince

Governor of Khorasan
- Tenure: 1829–1831
- Monarch: Fath-Ali Shah Qajar
- Predecessor: Hosein Khan Sardar Iravani
- Successor: Abbas Mirza
- Born: 19 January 1804; Tehran, Qajar Iran
- Died: 1852 (aged 48); Tehran, Qajar Iran
- Spouses: Galin Khanum; A Turkman woman; A woman from Mazandaran
- Issue: Galin Khanum; Parvin Khanum; Yaqub Mirza; Soltan Hosein Mirza; Nader Mirza; Khan-Galdi Khan
- Dynasty: Qajar
- Father: Fath-Ali Shah Qajar
- Mother: Maryam Khanum
- Religion: Twelver Shia Islam

Ahmad Ali Mirza (Persian: احمدعلی میرزا; born 19 July 1804; died 1852) was a son of Fath-Ali Shah Qajar and the father of Galin Khanum, the first wife of Naser-ed-din Shah Qajar. He was the governor of Khorasan.

== Early life ==
Ahmad Ali Mirza was born to Fath-Ali Shah Qajar and Maryam Khanum on 19 January 1804 in Tehran. His mother, prior to marriage to Fath-Ali Shah, was the royal consort of Agha Mohammad Khan Qajar until his martyrdom. Ahmad Ali Mirza was trained in Fars by Hosein-Ali Mirza Farmanfarma and his minister Cheraq-Ali Khan Navaee. Then, he moved to Nahavand and served his brother Mahmud Mirza, who was its governor.

== Background ==
Ahmad Ali Mirza had expertise in philosophy, medicine, astronomy, geometery, poetry, and calligraphy.

== Governorship ==
=== Background ===
In 1829, a fight broke out between Hosein Khan Sardar Iravani, the governor of Khorasan, and some local rulers. Among the rulers, the most powerful was Reza-Qoli Khan Ilkhani of the Zafaranlu clan, who was the ruler of Quchan, Neishabour, Chenaran, and Radkan. The fight, which was enticed either by domestic or foreign forces, did not produce any decisive outcome. It led to further chaos in the region. Reza-Qoli Khan sent a letter to Fath-Ali Shah, in which he expressed that he was at the Shah's service and petitioned to appoint a prince as the governor of Khorasan. The Shah approved this petition and appointed his son Ahmad Ali Mirza as the governor of Khorasan in 1829. Ahmad Ali Mirza's minister in this role was Mirza Musa, an astronomer and also known as Nayeb Rashti.

=== Conquest of Mashhad ===
Following the appointment, on 4 August 1829, Ahmad Ali Mirza departed Tehran with an army of cavalry and infantry and moved toward Khorasan. On 11 October, he arrived in Chenaran and met with Reza-Qoli Khan. To conquer the Mashhad fort, which was under the rule of Mohammad Khan Qaraee, they gathered 20,000 cavalry and infantry and six cannons. While they reached a distance of about six kilometers from Mashhad, other tribes, including Hazareh and Teymouri, and other local rulers, including Seyd Mohammad Khan Jalayer, the governor of Kalat and an ally of Mohammad Khan Qaraee, and Bonyad Khan Hazareh, the governor of Jam and Bakharz, joined them as well. Mohammad Khan Qaraee, the ruler of Mashhad, realized that the situation worsened from all sides and inevitably fled the city and its fortification without a fight. Finally, on 2 January 1830, Ahmad Ali Mirza settled in the Mashhad palace; and order was restored.

=== Battle of Sarakhs ===
In 1830, once again Mohammad Khan Qaraee and Palang Toosh Khan, a brother of Seyd Mohammad Khan Jalayer, the governor of Kalat, caused some troubles in Khorasan. They sent letters to Allah-Qoli Toureh, the ruler of Kharazm, that they have a plan to form an alliance with him. Then, Palang Toosh Khan went to Kharazm and met its ruler. There, he was admired and entitled General of Turkestan Border by the ruler and managed to entice the Turkmans to attack Khorasan. On the other hand, once Ahmad Ali Mirza heard about this, he gathered an army and moved toward the attacking forces. He arrived at the Khatoon bridge near Sarakhs and attacked the Turkmans. He, together with his army, captured a number of the Turkmans, killed some of them, forced the rest to flee, and finally defeated all the attacking forces. Meanwhile, the messenger that was sent by the Kharazm ruler to meet Mohammad Khan Qaraee was taken captive, but Ahmad Ali Mirza sent him back to Kharazm unharmed. This changed Allah-Qoli Toureh's perception to the point that he expressed friendship and unity toward Ahmad Ali Mirza, sent the Turkman elites with some gifts to express that they are at the prince's service, and managed to free the captives. Inevitably, Mohammad Khan Qaraee and Palang Toosh Khan took the path of humility and agreement toward Ahmad Ali Mirza.

=== End of tenure ===
Ahmad Ali Mirza's governorship lasted until 1831, when crown prince Abbas Mirza entered Mashhad with his army to protect Khorasan's borders and handle other affairs. Subsequently, Ahmad Ali Mirza moved to Tehran.

== Marriage and children ==
He married several women and had eleven chidren, including four sons and seven daughters.

Wives:

- Galin Khanum (nickname); a daughter of Hosein-Qoli Khan Qajar, brother of Fath-Ali Shah
- A Turkman woman
- A daughter of Mohammad-Taqi Khan Savadkoohi of Mazandaran

Daughters:

- Galin Khanum; first wife of Naser-ed-din Shah Qajar (married on 14 June 1845)
- Parvin Khanum; the wife of Mirza Hashem Khan Noori

Sons:

- Yaqub Mirza; from the Turkman mother
- Soltan Hosein Mirza; from the daughter of Mohammad-Taqi Khan Savadkoohi of Mazandaran
- Nader Mirza; from Galin Khanum, the daughter of Hosein-Qoli Khan Qajar, brother of Fath-Ali Shah
- Khan-Galdi Khan; from the Turkman woman

== Death ==
Ahmad Ali Mirza died in 1852 in Tehran.

== Sources ==
- Azodi, Ahmad Mirza Azdo-Dowleh (1887). تاریخ عضدی [Azodi History] (in Persian). Maharat.
- Bamdad, Mehdi (1978). شرح حال رجال ایران در قرن ۱۲ و ۱۳ و ۱۴ هجری [Biographies of Iranian Elites in 17-20th Centuries] (in Persian). Zavvar.
- Comprehensive History (2026). "تحریک الله قلی توره توسط محمد خان قرائی" [Enticing Allah-Qoli Toureh by Mohammad Khan Qaraee]. tarikh.inoor.ir website (in Persian).
- Khavari, Mirza Fazlollah Shirazi (1845). Tarikh Zol Qarnein (تاریخ ذوالقرنین) (in Persian). Ministry of Culture and Islamic Guidance of Iran.
- Sepehr, Mohammad Taqi Lesanolmolk (1855). ناسخ التواریخ تاریخ قاجاریه [Qajar History] (in Persian). Asatir.
