= Rashha =

Rashha (Persian: رشحه) was a female poet in Qajar Iran who mostly wrote about love poems in Persian. Born in 1783 and still alive by 1825, she was the daughter of the prominent poet Hatef Esfahani. Princess Zia ol-Saltaneh supported her works.

== Sources ==
- Brookshaw, Dominic Parviz (2013). "Women in Praise of Women: Female Poets and Female Patrons in Qajar Iran". Iranian Studies. 46 (1): 17–48. JSTOR 24482799.
- Karachi, Ruhangiz (2024). "The History of Women's Poetry: Beginning to the Present". Encyclopaedia Iranica.
