= Davari Shahnameh =

1856 manuscript

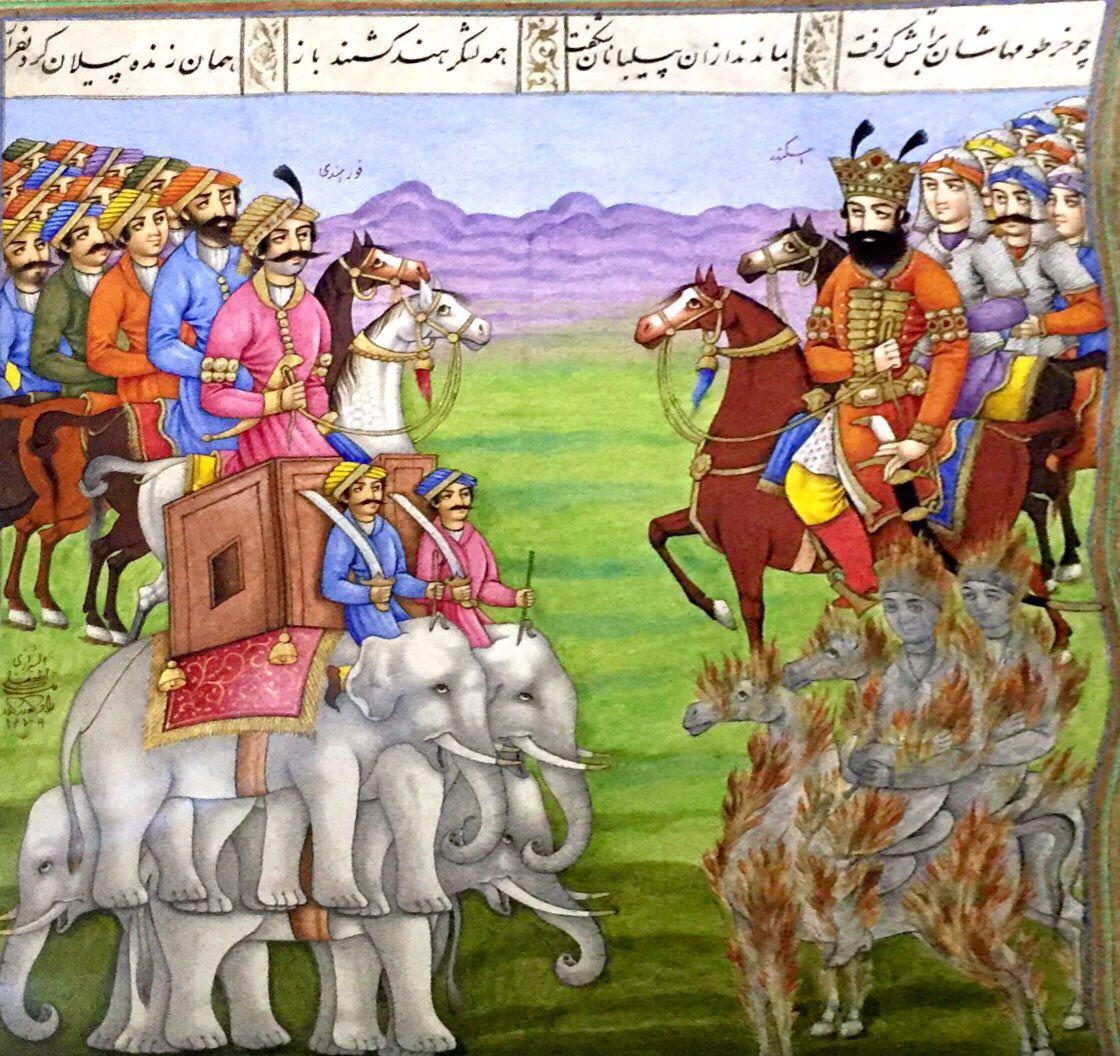
Miniature from the Davari Shahnameh by Lotf-Ali Khan Shirazi

The Davari Shahnameh or Shahnameh-ye Davari is an 1856 manuscript of the Shahnameh by Ferdowsi. Created by Mirza Mohammad Davari Shirazi (1822–1865) in 19th-century Qajar Iran, it is one of the last Shahnamehs made in the traditional style. It is stored at the Reza Abbasi Museum in Tehran, Iran under accession number 599. Majestically decorated and consisting of 68 illustrations, the Davari Shahnameh is comparable to courtly productions of the Shahnameh. However, unlike courtly productions, the Davari Shahnameh was not a commissioned work. According to art historian Massoumeh (Nahid) Assemi, the Davari Shahnameh may have been created "as an ode to a dying art".

== See also ==
- Qajar art

== Sources ==
- Assemi, Massoumeh (Nahid) (2022). "Shahnameh-ye Davari; An Ode to a Dying Art?". Iran: Journal of the British Institute of Persian Studies. 60 (2): 264–293. doi:10.1080/05786967.2020.1792798. S2CID 252111438.
- Nūrānī Weṣāl, ʿAbd-al-Wahhāb (2020). "DĀVARĪ ŠĪRĀZĪ, Mīrzā Moḥammad". In Yarshater, Ehsan (ed.). Encyclopædia Iranica (Online ed.). Encyclopædia Iranica Foundation.
- Simpson, Marianna Shreve (2020). "ŠĀH-NĀMA iv. Illustrations". In Yarshater, Ehsan (ed.). Encyclopædia Iranica (Online ed.). Encyclopædia Iranica Foundation.
