= Saeb Mausoleum =

Mausoleum in Isfahan, Iranian national heritage site

- آرامگاه صائب
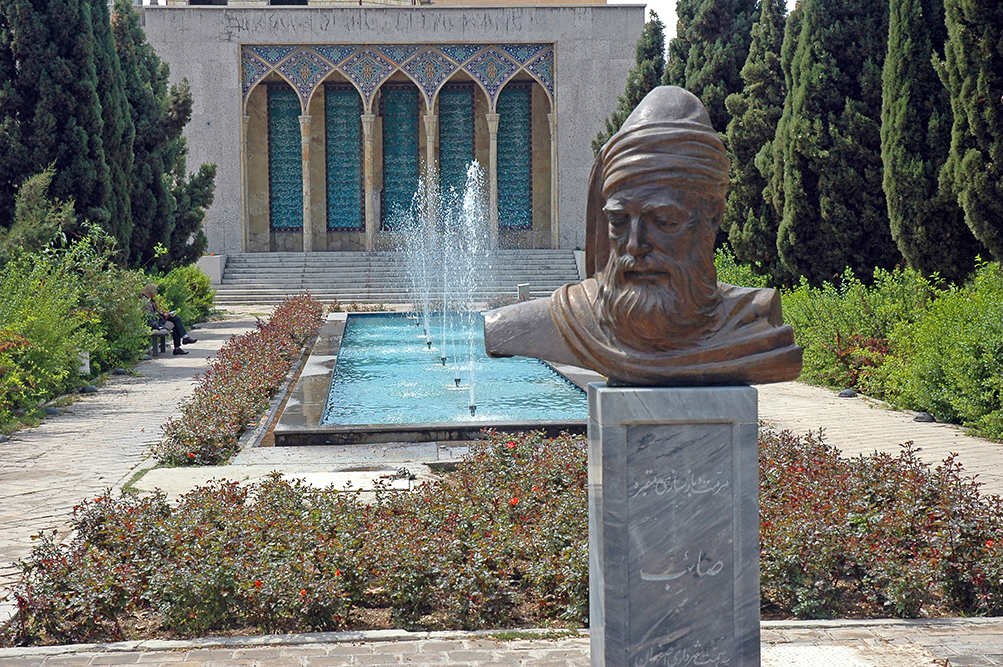
- A bust of Saeb, near the mausoleum, in 2009

- Location of the mausoleum in Iran

Religion
- Affiliation: Islam
- Ecclesiastical or organizational status: Mausoleum
- Status: Active

Location
- Location: Isfahan, Isfahan province
- Country: Iran
- Interactive map of Saeb Mausoleum
- Coordinates: 32°38′51″N 51°39′05″E

Architecture
- Type: Islamic architecture
- Style: Pahlavi
- Completed: 1087 AH (1676/1677 CE) (gravestone); 1967 (mausoleum)
- Materials: Stone; tiles

Iran National Heritage List
- Official name: Saeb Mausoleum
- Type: Built
- Designated: 9 February 1977
- Reference no.: 1332
- Conservation organization: Cultural Heritage, Handicrafts and Tourism Organization of Iran

The Saeb Mausoleum (Persian: آرامگاه صائب; Arabic: ضريح صائب التبريزي) is an Islamic mausoleum, located in Isfahan, Isfahan province, Iran. The mausoleum is the burial place of Mohammad Ali ibn Mirza Abdul Rahim Tabrizi, more commonly known as Saib Tabrizi, (Note: Also spelled as Saib Tabrizi.) a famous 17th century Iranian poet.

The mausoleum was added to the Iran National Heritage List on 9 February 1977 and is administered by the Cultural Heritage, Handicrafts and Tourism Organization of Iran.

== Overview ==
The ancestry of Saeb Tabrizi stems from Shams Tabrizi, Rumi's spiritual instructor. Saeb's father was a famous merchant in Tabriz. When Isfahan became the capital city, Saeb moved to Isfahan with his family. He tried for a long time to get the title of honour Malek osh-Shoara (poet laureate) from Abbas the Great, but he was unsuccessful and emigrated to India.

Saeb's mausoleum was completed in 1967, during the Pahlavi era, but his gravestone was dated 1087 AH (1676/1677 CE).

In 2025, the artist Mahmoud Farshchian was buried here.

== See also ==
- List of mausoleums in Iran
- List of historical structures in Isfahan
