= Ghazali Mashhadi =

Ghazali Mashhadi was a 16th-century Persian poet and the first poet laureate of the Mughal Empire under emperor Akbar. Born in Safavid Iran, he migrated to India and served in Mughal court. Due to his prolific output of over 50,000 couplets, he contributed in the development of the Indian style of Persian poetry.

== Biography ==
=== Early life ===
Ghazali was born in 930 AH (1524 AD) or 933 AH (1526/1527 AD) in Mashhad, Safavid Iran. While early biographical memoirs do not explicitly confirm his original birth name, the 17th-century memoir Hamesha Bahar by Kishan Chand Ikhlas records his name as Ali Razai Mashhadi. In his youth, Ghazali moved to Qazvin and entered the royal court of Safavid ruler Shah Tahmasp I. His travels across Persia included visits to Herat, Tabriz, Kerman, and Shiraz. In 958 AH (1551/1552 AD), Shah Tahmasp sent him to Shiraz to compose a satire against Khwaja Amir Beg Kajaji, the keeper of the royal seal. His non-conformist thinking and philosophical views brought accusations of heresy and threats against his life in Iraq and Iran, forcing him to flee to India.

=== In India ===
Ghazali traveled by sea to the Deccan, where he initially struggled to secure literary patronage. He was subsequently invited to Jaunpur by Ali Quli Khan Zaman, the governor of Jaunpur, who provided him with horses and a gift of one thousand rupees. In Jaunpur, Ghazali served Zaman until Zaman's death. At his Zaman's request, Ghazali composed Naqsh-e Badi, a mystical masnavi of approximately 1,000 couplets modeled after Nizami Ganjavi's Makhzan ol-Asrar. Accounts record that Zaman rewarded him with one gold coin for every couplet produced.

Ghazali had already dedicated a collection of his poetry (Athar al-Shabab) to Mughal emperor Akbar in 966 AH (1558/1559 AD). Following Zaman's death during a revolt against Akbar in 974 AH (1567 AD), Ghazali entered Akbar's imperial service. In 975 AH (1567/1568 AD), Akbar designated him Malik al-Shuara (poet laureate), establishing a prestigious court title that Ghazali was the first to hold. He is recognized as an early pioneer and key representative of the Sabk-e-Hindi (Indian style) of Persian poetry. His total output is estimated between 50,000 and 100,000 couplets. His work Divan includes qasidas, ghazals, masnavis, qitas, rubaiyat, tarkib-bands, and tarji-bands.

=== Death ===
Purported Tomb of Ghazali Mashhadi, at Sarkhej Roza

In 980 AH (1572 AD), Ghazali accompanied emperor Akbar on his military expedition to Gujarat. Upon reaching Ahmedabad, Ghazali fell ill and died on Thursday, 27 Rajab 980 AH (3 December 1572). By order of emperor Akbar, he was buried at Sarkhej Roza, in a royal cemetery reserved for nobles, princes, and revered saints. The Mughal chronicle Mirat-ul-Alam notes that he left behind an estate valued at 300,000 rupees along with other valuables. A plaque commemorating Mashhadi was placed near Rani ka Mahal at Sarkhej Roza by the Sarkhej Roza Committee, attributing his grave location based on research by historian Shamsuddin Siddiqui. The Archaeological Survey of India (ASI) and several Islamic scholars treat the exact tomb identification among five anonymous graves as unconfirmed.
