= Mahmud Mirza Qajar =

Mahmud Mirza
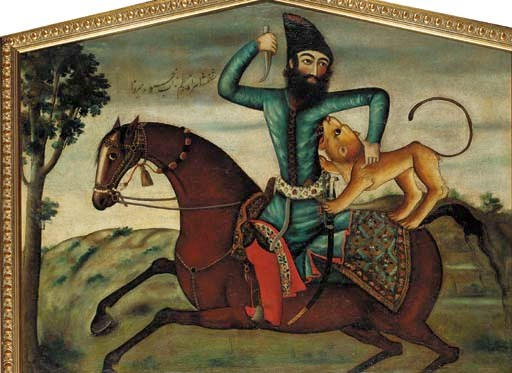
- Mahmud Mirza, on horseback, fights off a lion. Oil on canvas, first half 19th century

Governor of Nahavand
- Tenure: 1813–1825
- Predecessor: Unknown
- Successor: Homayun Mirza

Governor of Lorestan
- Tenure: 1825 – ?
- Predecessor: Unknown
- Successor: Unknown
- Born: 1799
- Died: Between 1854 and 1858
- Burial: Nahavand
- House: Qajar
- Father: Fath-Ali Shah Qajar
- Mother: Maryam Khanom

Mahmud Mirza.

Mahmud Mirza riding a horse, unknown painter.

Mahmud Mirza Qajar (Persian: محمودمیرزا قاجار; also spelled Mahmoud; 1799 – between 1854 and 1858) was an Iranian prince of the Qajar dynasty and the fifteenth son of Fath-Ali Shah, king (shah) of Qajar Iran (r. 1797–1834). He was a patron of the arts and an accomplished calligrapher, poet, and anthologist in his own right.

== Biography ==
Mahmud Mirza was the fifteenth son of Qajar shah Fath-Ali Shah (r. 1797–1834), born by his Jewish wife, known as Maryam Khanom. From Mazandaran, she is said to have been a great beauty. Mahmud Mirza was Maryam Khanom's eldest son and was considered her most accomplished. His other full siblings who survived to adulthood included Zia ol-Saltaneh, Soltan Begom (d. 1826), Homayun Mirza (d. 1851), Ahmad-Ali Mirza (b. 1804), and Jahanshah Mirza (d. 1835).

Mahmud Mirza grew up in the household of Mirza Shafi Mazandarani (d. 1819), his mentor and then grand vizier to Fath-Ali Shah. In 1813, Mahmud Mirza was given the governorship of Nahavand, followed by the governorship of Lorestan in 1825. He soon established himself as a patron of the arts, inviting many poets and men of letters to join his provincial residence at Nahavand, including the court historian Mohammad Taqi "Lesan ol-Molk" Sepehr. Mahmud Mirza also ordered the construction of majestic buildings in Nahavand, amongst them the Ru'in-dez fortress, the Kakh-e Homayun palace, a madraseh for his son Siyavash Mirza, and a garden known as the Bagh-e Shah; however, only a minimal traces of these buildings have survived to this day.

Mahmud Mirza also promoted scholarly works, himself writing over twenty works ranging in topic from historical to literary to religious, including two essential anthologies (tazkerehs) of poetry by his father, his own sons, and other contemporary male Qajar poets. These two anthologies are known as the Safinat ol-Mahmud and the Bayan ol-Mahmud. The Safinat ol-Mahmud was completed in 1824–1825 at the order of his father, who also gave the book its title.

Mahmud Mirza was also a respected calligrapher and poet, and he reportedly trained a series of wives of the shah and their daughters to write poetry, teaching them also to write calligraphy in the Shekasteh and Nashq forms. Mahmud Mirza also authored the Sonbolestan and Noql-e Majles ("The confection of the assembly"). Although these works are less known, they contain important information on contemporaneous Qajar women and the poetry they wrote. In the introduction of the Noql-e Majles, Mahmud Mirza writes that the book was at the request of his sister Zia ol-Saltaneh.

Mahmud Mirza's chief wife (galin), the daughter of Mohammad Khan Qajar Iravani, was selected for him by his father Fath-Ali Shah. Mahmud Mirza's other wives were a daughter of Ali-Morad Khan Zand (r. 1781–1785) known as Gowhar-Taj Khanum; a relative of Nader Shah (r. 1736–1747); and a wife who had once been married to the late Mirza Shafi Mazandarani. Mahmud Mirza had thirty-four children, equally divided between seventeen boys and seventeen girls.

After the death of Fath-Ali Shah, Mahmud Mirza opposed the accession of his nephew (and Fath-Ali Shah's grandson) Mohammad Shah Qajar (r. 1834–1848). As a result, Mahmud Mirza was incarcerated, along with other rebel princes, in Ardabil and later in Tabriz. He apparently died at some point between 1854 and 1858, during the reign of Mohammad Shah Qajar's son and successor, Naser al-Din Shah Qajar. Mahmud Mirza appears to have been buried in Nahavand—the site of his first governorship.

== Sources ==
- Abe, Naofumi (2017). "The Politics of Poetics in Early Qajar Iran: Writing Royal-Commissioned Tazkeras at Fath-ʿAli Shāh's Court". Journal of Persianate Studies. 10 (2): 129–157. doi:10.1163/18747167-12341311.
- Brookshaw, Dominic Parviz (2006a). "MAḤMUD MIRZĀ". In Yarshater, Ehsan (ed.). Encyclopædia Iranica (Online ed.). Encyclopædia Iranica Foundation.
- Brookshaw, Dominic Parviz (2006b). "MARYAM KHANOM". In Yarshater, Ehsan (ed.). Encyclopædia Iranica (Online ed.). Encyclopædia Iranica Foundation.
