= Mirza Mohammad Davari Shirazi =

Iranian poet and painter (1822/23–1866)

Mirza Mohammad Davari Shirazi (Persian: میرزا محمد داوری شیرازی; 1822/23–1866) was a poet, calligrapher, and painter in Qajar Iran. He was the third son of Vesal Shirazi.

== See also ==
- Davari Shahnameh

== Sources ==
- Vesal, Abdol Vahab Nurani (1994). "Dāvarī Šīrāzī, Mīrzā Moḥammad". In Yarshater, Ehsan (ed.). Encyclopædia Iranica (Online ed.). Encyclopædia Iranica Foundation. ISBN 978-0710090959.
