= Khorasani style (poetry) =

Movement in Persian poetry

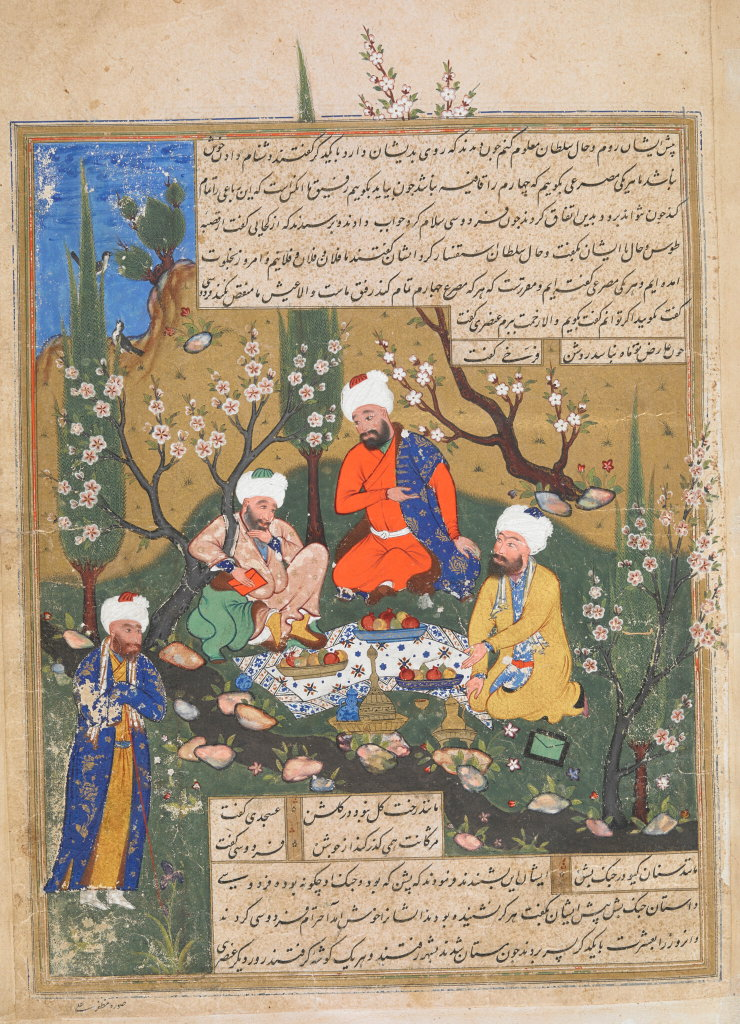
A 16th-century Safavid miniature showing Ferdowsi, the greatest epic poet of the Khorasani style, approaching a banquet of three panegyrists of this style: Unsuri, Farrukhi, and Asjadi.

Khorāsānī style (Persian: سبک خراسانی sabk-i Khorāsānī 'the style of Khurāsān', ', also transliterated Khurāsānī) was a movement in Persian poetry associated with the court of the Ghaznavids, associated with Greater Khorasan (now divided between Iran, Afghanistan, Tajikistan, and Uzbekistan).

== History ==
The term was coined in the early twentieth century. It is traditionally considered to characterise the first period of New Persian poetry, running from the ninth century CE into the second half of the twelfth. It is characterized by its plain poetic technique, concrete images and metaphors, and some archaic linguistic features. While showing limited use of Arabic loan-words, poetry in this style was influenced by Arabic verse, particularly in terms of its prosody, and the dominant genre was the praise-poem.

The Khurāsānī period was succeeded by the sabk-i ‘Irāqī ('style of Iraq'), with its greater use of Arabisms, more elaborate metaphors and imagery, and turn towards spiritualism. However, the transition between the periods was not a sharp one. The style saw a return to popularity with the so-called literary revival (bazgasht-e adabi) of the eighteenth to twentieth centuries.

== Exponents ==
The pre-eminent study of the style was by Muḥammad Jaʻfar Maḥjūb in 1971. The chief representatives of this lyricism are Asjadi, Farrukhi Sistani, Unsuri, and Manuchehri. Panegyric masters such as Rudaki were known for their love of nature, their verse abounding with evocative descriptions.

== Example ==
A. A. Seyed-Gohrab contrasts the following passages to illustrate the Khorāsānī style. The first is a description of a palace from Qaṣīda 31 by Farrukhī Sistānī, writing in the earlier eleventh century. It is plain and concrete in its description:

There was a kingly palace in the middle of the garden
The top of the parapets was situated between two turrets
Within the palace, there were decorated porticoes
Each opening towards a belvedere
One was adorned like Chinese brocade
The other contained pictures as in Mani's Artang
In this palace, the images of the King of the East
Were carved/painted in several places:
In one place, he is fighting, holding in his hand a small javelin
In another place, he is feasting, holding in his hand a cup of wine.

The second is from the end of the sabk-i Khurāsānī period, near to the sabk-i ‘Irāqī period: a description of a palace built by Arslān Shah of Ghazna, composed by ‘Uthmān Mukhtārī in the vicinity of 1100. This description is far less concrete and much more spiritual in tone:

The ancient sphere established the centre of the world's empire
Through this place, through which Jupiter exercises its heavenly influence.
When the sun saw its parapets from the sky,
It bowed its head to the ground, and its eyes to the threshold.
[When] the virgins of paradise beheld it from their gardens,
They took this palace for gold, and paradise as the mine.
They considered the earth insignificant because of its firm structure;
The air in this palace was so fine that the air (outside) was heavy.
The architect used his intellect and soul to design this edifice
Through the firmness of his intellect and the grace of his soul.
