= Masih Kashani =

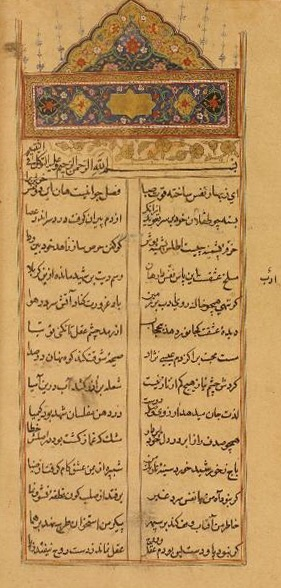
- A page of the divan (collection of poetry) of Masih Kashani, dated 1614
- Born: 1577 Kashan, Safavid Iran
- Died: 1656 (aged 78–79) Kashan, Safavid Iran
- Occupation: Physician, poet
- Language: Persian
- Notable works: Three divans (collections of poetry)

Masih Kashani (Persian: مسیح کاشانی; 1577–1656), was a physician and poet in the 16th and 17th centuries, who compiled three Persian divans (collections of poetry), creating one while in Safavid Iran and two during his time in India.

He was born in 1577 in Kashan. His family was well-known in medicine; his father, Nezam al-Din Ali, served as a court physician for three years during the reign of Shah Tahmasp I (r. 1524–1576), and continued practicising medicine during the reign of Shah Mohammad Khodabanda (r. 1578–1587). From early youth, Masih Kashani was inclined toward both medicine and poetry, and gained fame in both fields. He entered the service of Shah Abbas I (r. 1587–1629) and became close to him, accompanying him in both travel and at court as his poet laureate. Fakhr al-Zamani Qazvini described Masih Kashani's youth as marked by "wine-drinking and recklessness."

Following accusations that he had neglected Shah Abbas I's health, Masih Kashani immigrated to India in 1597. In Agra, with the help of Abu'l-Hasan Asaf Khan, he gained audience with the Mughal emperor Akbar (r. 1556–1605). Some time later, he traveled to Allahabad and entered the retinue of prince Salim, returning with him to Agra. But he did not remain there, and from there traveled to the Deccan region. In Golconda, he served under its Qutb Shahi ruler Muhammad Quli Qutb Shah (r. 1580–1612); from there, he went to Bijapur and started working under its Adil Shahi rulers. After these transfers, he returned to Agra, and from around 1614, he was in the service of the Mughal general and statesman Mahabat Khan.

In 1630, intending to visit Mashhad and performing a pilgrimage to Mecca, Masih Kashani departed from India. On this journey to Mashhad, he passed through Kashan, Isfahan, and Shiraz. He eventually re-settled in Kashan, where he remained until his death in 1656.

Masih Kashani is considered one of the most prolific poets of his time. Although some recent sources have disputed this, Masih Kashani and Shifa'i Isfahani were reportedly the teachers of the prominent 17th-century poet Saib Tabrizi.

== Sources ==
- Rahman, Munibur (1995). "Ṣāʾib". In Bosworth, C. E.; van Donzel, E.; Heinrichs, W. P. & Lecomte, G. (eds.). The Encyclopaedia of Islam, Second Edition. Volume VIII: Ned–Sam. Leiden: E. J. Brill. ISBN 978-90-04-09834-3.
- Safa, Zabihollah (2010). History of Iranian Literature, volume 4. Ferdows Publications. ISBN 978-9643204754.
- Savory, Roger M.; de Bruijn, J.T.P.; Newman, A.J. & Welch, A.T. (1995). "Ṣafawids". In Bosworth, C. E.; van Donzel, E.; Heinrichs, W. P. & Lecomte, G. (eds.). The Encyclopaedia of Islam, Second Edition. Volume VIII: Ned–Sam. Leiden: E. J. Brill. doi:10.1163/1573-3912_islam_COM_0964. ISBN 978-90-04-09834-3.
