= Galin Khanom =

Royal consort of Naser al-Din Shah Qajar

Galin Khatun گلین خاتون
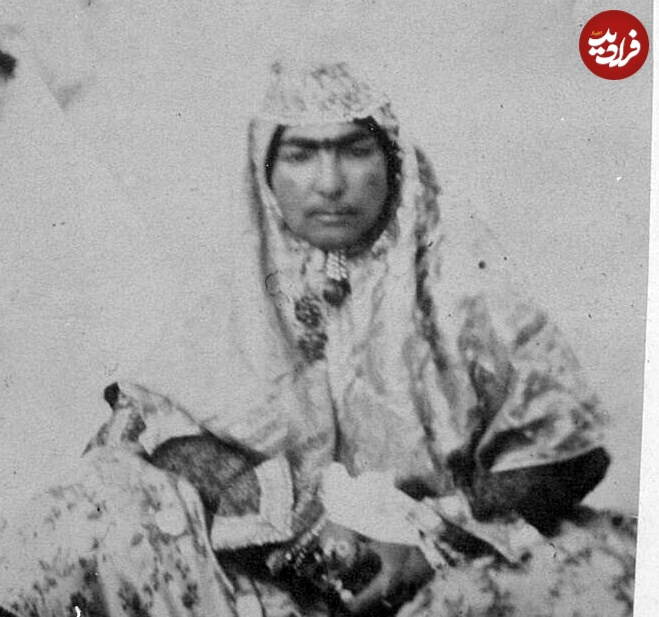

first consort of the Qajar Shah (mother of the former Crown Prince)
- Spouse: Naseraddin Shah (m. 1846)
- Issue: Fakhr ol-Moluk; Mahmoud Mirza; Afsar od-Dowleh; Mohammad Mirza
- House: Qajar
- Father: Ahmad Ali Mirza
- Religion: Shia Islam

Galin Khatun (Persian: گلین خاتون; b.1831/1832) was the first legal wife and royal consort of Naseraddin Shah Qajar and the mother of his first crown prince, Sultan Mahmoud Mirza. She was the daughter of Ahmad Ali Mirza, the nineteenth son of Fath Ali Shah Qajar and Zibachehr Khanom, a Georgian woman. At the age of 14, she married Naseraddin Shah and through the years ahead bore him four children.

== Biography ==
Born as Umm Salama, Galin Khatun was the granddaughter of Fath Ali Shah Qajar and married her cousin, Naseraddin Shah Qajar when he was still only a prince living in Tabriz and became Mahd Olia's first daughter-in-law. Later when Naser got crowned as the Shah, she moved to the royal harem in Tehran along with the rest of the women, servants, crew, staff and her two children at that time, Fakhr Olmoluk and Mahmoud Mirza, who became the crown prince. Mahmoud had the support of Amir Kabir (the influential Grand Vizier at the time) as Naser's firstborn son and the legal choice for the throne but he died in the early years of his father's reign, around 1852 when he was only 5-6 years old, the same year as Amir Kabir's death.

Loosing Mahmoud, Galin suffocated long periods of depression and isolation and got drawn to a corner of the harem. She held long sessions of prayers for her lost son. Her ranks as the first wife did no good to her and she was often overlooked and not present in any harem event for a long time.

Years later, Galin gave birth to two other children, her daughter Fakhr Olmoluk still remaining the oldest child of Naseraddin Shah.

She is reported to have been among the prominent calligraphers of the Qajar era, artistically active during the 19th century. She excelled particularly in the Naskh script, and several of her works survive today. Besides calligraphy, she also possessed a talent for poetry. Her poetic name, under which she gained fame, was "Ismat Qajar." Due to her extensive knowledge in various fields, she was frequently consulted by the court princes.

== In popular culture ==
- Portrayed by Fatemeh Goudarzi in the 1999 movie The Triumphant Warrior
- Portrayed by Samira Hasanpour in the 2023—2022 TV show Jeyran
