= Farrukhi Sistani =

Persian poet

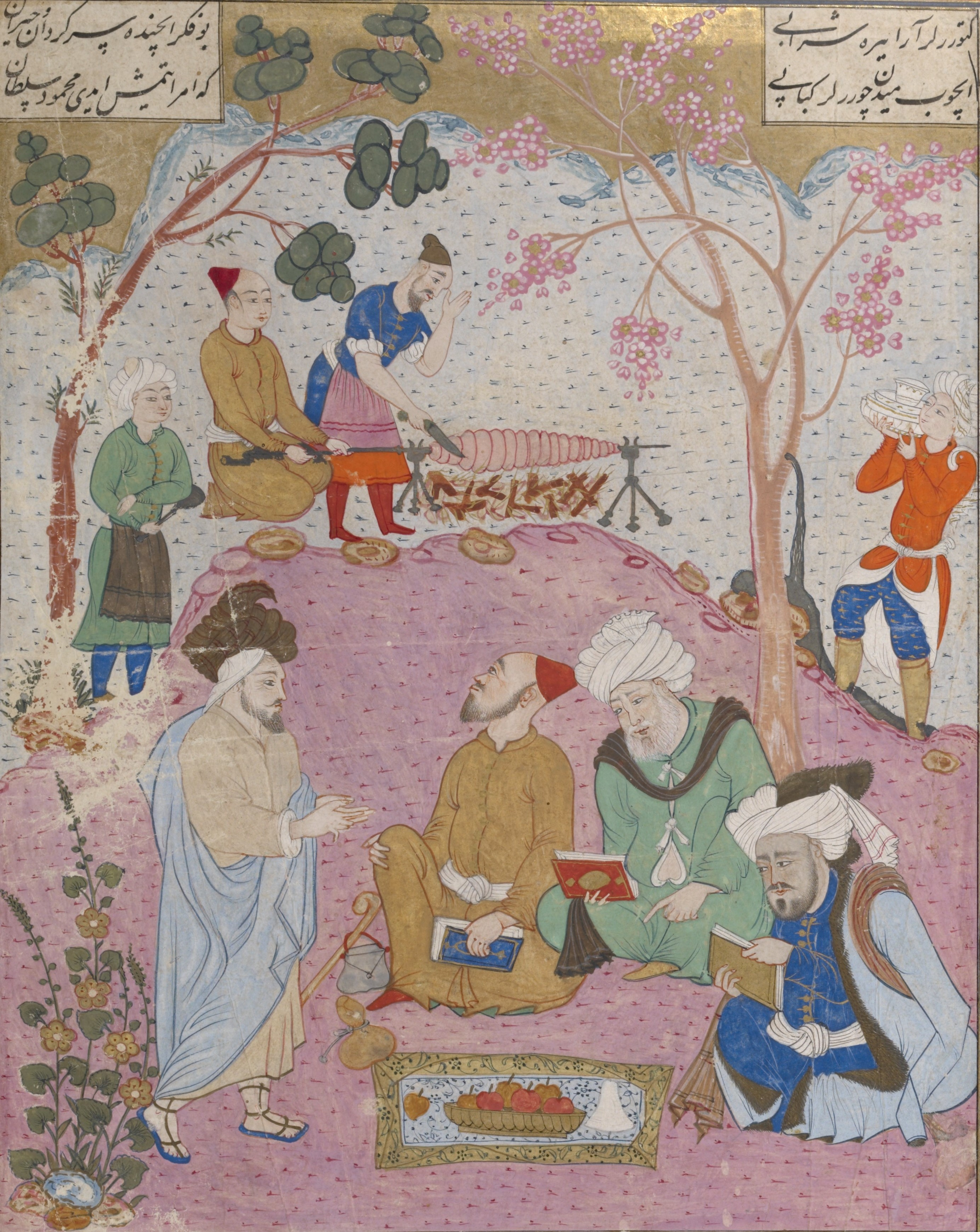
- 17th-century Shahnameh illustration of Ferdowsi approaching the three court poets of Ghazni: Unsuri, Farrukhi and Asjadi
- Born: c. 1000; Sistan, Saffarid dynasty
- Died: c. 1040; Ghazni, Ghaznavid Empire
- Occupation: Poet
- Relatives: Julugh (father)

Abu'l-Hasan Ali ibn Julugh Farrukhi Sistani (Persian: ابوالحسن علی بن جولوغ فرخی سیستانی), better known as Farrukhi Sistani (فرخی سیستانی; c. 1000 – 1040) was one of the most prominent Persian court poets in the history of Persian literature. Initially serving a dehqan in Sistan and the Muhtajids in Chaghaniyan, Farrukhi entered the service of the Ghaznavids in 1017, where he became the panegyrist of its rulers, Mahmud (r. 999–1030) and Mas'ud I (r. 1030–1040), as well as numerous viziers and princes.

== Background ==
Farrukhi was born in c. 1000 in Sistan, a region extending across the border between eastern Iran and what is now southern Afghanistan. At that time Sistan was under Saffarid rule. Farrukhi's father Julugh was a high-ranking military slave (ghulam) of the Saffarid king Khalaf ibn Ahmad (r. 963–1003). The origins of Julugh are unclear. Regardless, Farrukhi grew up in a Muslim Persian-speaking environment, and was essentially a Persian. In 1003, the Saffarid dynasty was abolished by the Ghaznavid monarch Mahmud (r. 999–1030), who made Sistan a Ghaznavid province.

== Life ==
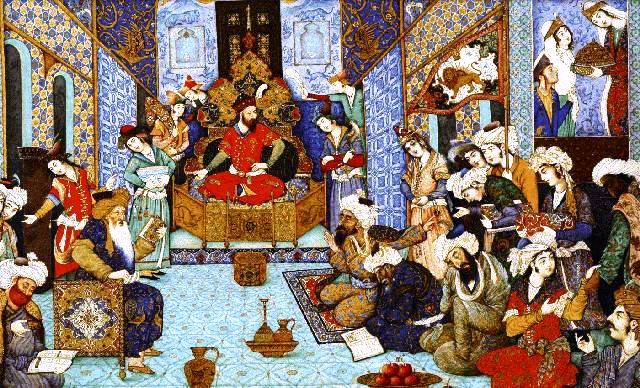
Illustration of Mahmud of Ghazni and his court

According to the tadhkirahs, Farrukhi was talented from an early age in poetry and playing the lute. During his youth, he used these skills to serve a landowner (dehqan), but due to insufficient salary, he left Sistan to seek his fortunes in Transoxiana, where he in the autumn of 1016 entered the service of the Muhtajid prince Abu'l-Muzaffar Fakhr al-Dawla Ahmad ibn Muhammad, who ruled Chaghaniyan as a vassal of the Ghaznavids. During the Mehregan festival, Farrukhi composed a poem for Abu'l-Muzaffar. However, hardly a year later, Farrukhi left for the Ghaznavid capital of Ghazni, where he joined the court of Mahmud, eventually becoming his panegyrist. It was at Ghazni that Farrukhi reached his goal of renown and riches.

Farrukhi continued to hold a strong love for his homeland Sistan, even though he would never live there again. He seemingly visited the place from time to time, and still kept touch with relatives and friends. In 1027, he composed a poem for the Ghaznavid vizier Hasanak, applauding the latter for improving the conditions of Sistan, which had been in a state of chaos after Mahmud's brutal conquest in 1003. However, this was only temporary; many Sistanis continued to dislike the Ghaznavids and the heavy taxes they imposed on them. According to the Tarikh-i Sistan—whose author was staunchly pro-Saffarid—the start of Ghaznavid rule was the "beginning of calamity for Sistan." In 1030, Mahmud was forced to step in, appointing the Saffarid prince Taj al-Din I Abu'l-Fadl Nasr as the vassal ruler of Sistan, marking the start of the Nasrid dynasty.

Farrukhi also served as the panegyrist of Mahmud's son and second successor Mas'ud I (r. 1030–1040), as well as numerous viziers and princes. He died in Ghazni in c. 1040. According to the Encyclopedia Iranica, "he was one of the most successful court poets in the history of Persian literature." He was present in the Ghaznavid court during the apex of the empire under Mahmud. His poems celebrate various court events, such as the Iranian festivals of Mihragan, Nowruz, and Sadeh, and the Islamic Eid al-Fitr, as well as Mahmud's famous raid on the temple of Somnath (Sūmnāt) in Gujarat in 1026.

== Works ==
Farrukhi's surviving works consist mainly of his divan (collection of poems), which number about 9,000 couplets. A document in the Bankipore Library refers to Farrukhi as the author of an epic poem, the Shahriyarnameh: this is yet to be confirmed.

== Sources ==
- Bosworth, C. Edmund (2000). "Saffarids". Encyclopaedia Iranica.
- de Bruijn, J. T. P. (1999). "Farroḵī Sīstānī, Abu'l-Ḥasan ʿAlī". Encyclopaedia Iranica.
- Hillenbrand, Robert; Peacock, A. C. S.; Abdullaeva, Firuza (2013). Ferdowsi, the Mongols and the History of Iran: Art, Literature and Culture from Early Islam to Qajar Persia. Bloomsbury Publishing. pp. 1–432. ISBN 9781786734655.
- Meneghini, Daniela (2012). "Farrukhī Sīstānī". In Fleet, Kate; Krämer, Gudrun; Matringe, Denis; Nawas, John; Rowson, Everett (eds.). Encyclopaedia of Islam (3rd ed.). Brill Online. ISSN 1873-9830.
- Tetley, Gillies (2008). The Ghaznavid and Seljuk Turks: Poetry as a Source for Iranian History. Routledge. ISBN 9781134084388.
