= Maryam Khanom =

Iranian royal consort

- Born: 1770; Mazandaran province
- Died: 1843 (aged 72–73); Qajar Iran
- Consort of: Agha Mohammad Khan Qajar; Fath-Ali Shah Qajar
- Issue: Zia ol-Saltaneh; Mahmud Mirza Qajar; Jahanshah Mirza; Homāyun Mirza; Ahmad Ali Mirza
- House: Qajar dynasty (by marriage)

Maryam Khanom Bani Isra'il (Persian: مریم خانم یهودی; 1770–1843}) was the royal consort of Shah Agha Mohammad Khan Qajar (r. 1789–1797). She was then the 39th royal consort of Agha Mohammad's nephew and successor Shah Fath-Ali Shah Qajar (r. 1797–1834).

== Life ==
Maryam Khanom was from Māzandarān and was Jewish, of Jewish origin, and is sometimes referred to as "Maryam Khanom Bani Isra'il" (Arabic: بني إسرائيل "sons - or children - of Israel") to distinguish her from Maryam Khanom Gorji, another consort of Fath-Ali. She was reported to have "no rival in beauty".

She was the royal consort of Shah Agha Mohammad Khan Qajar (r. 1789–1797).

When she was widowed the first time in 1797, khan (governor) Hossein Khan Sardar, the brother of the new shah wished to marry her. But Shah Fath-Ali Shah Qajar (r. 1797–1834; Agha Mohammad's nephew and successor) himself instead married her, which caused a conflict between them. She was the 39th royal consort of Shah Fath-Ali Shah Qajar.

She had 11 children, of whom six lived to adulthood. Among them were prince Mahmud Mirza Qajar (1799–1835; governor of Lorestān), Homāyun Mirzā (1801–56; governor of Nahāvand), Ahmad Ali Mirza (born 1804; governor of Khorasan), Jahānšāh Mirzā (1809-35), Żiāʾ-al-Salṭana, Solṭān Begom (d. 1826), Solṭān Begom, and Mošir Salimi.

== See also ==
- List of Iranian women royalty
