= Begum Khanum =

Qajar royal consort

Begum Khanum (Persian: بیگم خانم) was the 62nd wife of the Qajar shah of Iran, Fath-Ali Shah Qajar (r. 1797–1834). Together they had three children, including Parviz Mirza, the 53rd son of Fath-Ali Shah. The other two died during their childhood. The Islamic law only allowing a man to have four wives, she was technically his concubine and not his legal wife.

Begum Khanum was the daughter of a certain Haji Elias Tajrishi and was from Tajrish.

== Sources ==
- Hamadani, Ali Karam (2018). "بیگم خانم". The Great Islamic Encyclopaedia (in Persian).
