= Parviz Mirza (Qajar prince) =

Qajar prince (1823/1824 – 1888)

Parviz Mirza پرویزمیرزا
- Nayyir al-Dowleh
- Born: 1823 or 1824; Tehran, Qajar Iran
- Died: 24 April 1888; Tehran, Qajar Iran
- Issue: Two sons and two daughters
- Dynasty: Qajar
- Father: Fath-Ali Shah Qajar
- Mother: Begum Khanum
- Occupation: Statesman, Governor

Parviz Mirza (Persian: پرویزمیرزا; 1823/1824 – 24 April 1888) was a Qajar prince and the fifty-third son of Fath-Ali Shah Qajar.

== Biography ==
Parviz Mirza was born in 1823 or 1824. His mother, Begum Khanum, was the daughter of Haji Elias Tajrishi. During his childhood, the district of Tajrish was granted to him as a fief.

In 1859 or 1860, he accompanied Hamzeh Mirza Heshmat od-Dowleh, the governor of Khorasan, to the province. For a period, he ruled over the cities of Nishapur, Torbat Heydarieh, Torshiz, and Sabzevar.

According to E'temad os-Saltaneh’s notes, Parviz Mirza, the son of Fath-Ali Shah Qajar, who often resided in Khorasan and ruled over Sabzevar and Nishapur, died on Monday, 24 April 1888. His title was conferred upon his son, Soltan Hossein Mirza, known as Pishkhedmat.

Parviz Mirza married the daughter of Mohammad Baqer Khan Biglarbegi Qajar. His sons included Sultan Hossein Mirza Nayyir al-Dowleh and Khosrow Mirza. Sultan Hossein Mirza later served as the governor of Khorasan, while Khosrow Mirza died at a young age in Zanjan due to a horse-riding accident. Nayyir al-Dowleh also had two daughters, one of whom married Mohammad Rahim Khan Khazen al-Molk.
