= Khaneqah Sorkh =

Village in West Azerbaijan province, Iran

Khaneqah Sorkh Persian: خانقاه سرخ
- Village
- Location within Iran
- Coordinates: 37°45′22″N 45°01′54″E
- Country: Iran
- Province: West Azerbaijan
- County: Urmia
- District: Nazlu
- Rural District: Nazluy-e Shomali

Population (2016)
  - Total: 1,789
- Time zone: UTC+3:30 (IRST)

Khaneqah Sorkh (Persian: خانقاه سرخ) (Note: Also romanized as Khānaqāh Sorkh, Khāneqāh Sorkh, and Khānqāh-e Sorkh) is a village in Nazluy-e Shomali Rural District of Nazlu District in Urmia County, West Azerbaijan province, Iran.

== Demographics ==
=== Population ===
At the time of the 2006 National Census, the village's population was 1,469 in 362 households. The following census in 2011 counted 1,729 people in 484 households. The 2016 census measured the population of the village as 1,789 people in 517 households. It was the most populous village in its rural district.
