= Nathaniel Bland =

English cricketer and orientalist

Nathaniel Bland (3 February 1803 – 10 August 1865), born Nathaniel Crumpe, was an English orientalist and a first-class cricketer who played for Marylebone Cricket Club between 1836 and 1841. He was born in Liverpool and but later committed suicide in Homburg after losing his fortune to gambling. He appeared in two first-class matches.

== Life ==
He was the son of Nathaniel Bland-Crumpe, who was Irish, originally Nathaniel Crumpe but having taken the additional surname of his mother Dorothea Bland, who resided at Randalls Park, Leatherhead which he bought in 1812. His mother's surname was O'Neill.

Bland entered Eton College in 1818, and joined Christ Church college at Oxford in 1823, where he studied Persian language. He graduated B.A. in 1825. He was a bibliophile and many oriental manuscripts at the John Rylands Library can be traced back to Bland. Bland was a member of the Royal Asiatic Society of Great Britain and Ireland.

== Selected works ==
- A Century of Persian Ghazals, London, 1851
- "Account of the Atesh Kedah, a Biographical Work on the Persian Poets, by Hajji Lutf Ali Beg, of Ispakan", Journal of the Royal Asiatic Society of Great Britain and Ireland, Volume 7.
- "On the Earliest Persian Biography of Poets, by Muhammad Aúfi, and on Some Other Works of the Class Called Tazkirat ul Shuârá", Journal of the Royal Asiatic Society of Great Britain and Ireland, Volume 9.
- "On the Persian Game of Chess", Journal of the Royal Asiatic Society of Great Britain and Ireland, Volume 13.
- "On the Muhammedan Science of Tâbír, or Interpretation of Dreams", Journal of the Royal Asiatic Society of Great Britain and Ireland, Volume 16.

== Bibliography ==
- Haygarth, Arthur (1996) [1862]. Scores & Biographies, Volume 1 (1744–1826). Kennington: Frederick Lillywhite. ISBN 978-19-00592-23-9.
- Haygarth, Arthur (1997) [1862]. Scores & Biographies, Volume 2 (1827–1840). Kennington: Frederick Lillywhite. ISBN 978-19-00592-23-9.
