= Asjadi =

10th/11th-century Persian royal poet

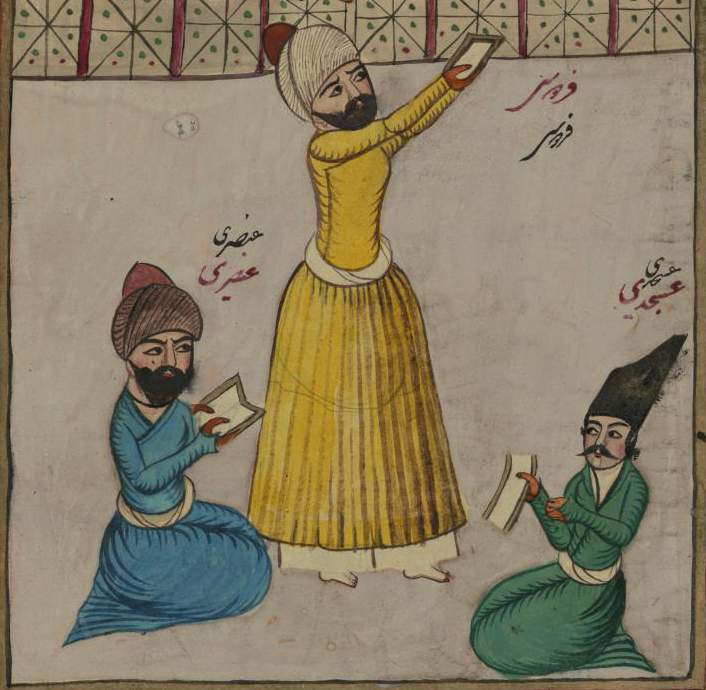
Qajar-era miniature of the poets Ferdowsi, Unsuri and Asjadi

Abu Nazar ʿAbdul ʿAziz bin Mansur ʿAsjadi (Persian: ابونظر عبدالعزیز بن منصور عسجدی) was a 10th-11th century royal Persian poet of the Ghaznavid empire located in the Ghazni province of today's Afghanistan.

Originating from Merv, and in some accounts Herat, he was a follower of the panegyric school of poetry of Unsuri in Khorasan, and was a companion of Farrukhi Sistani and Ferdowsi as well.

His Divan was already unavailable by the 15th century (if not earlier) and is unknown, though around 200 of his verses had been recorded elsewhere. A quatrain attributed to Asjadi was translated by Edward Granville Browne as follows:

I do repent of wine and talk of wine,

Of idols fair with charms like silver fine:

A lip-repentance and a lustful heart—

O God, forgive this penitence of mine!

Another verse, quoted in the Qabus-Nama and attributed to Asjadi, is also translated by Browne: "In youth or age did the question lie, / The young would live and the old would die."

Asjadi died between 1040 and 1043 CE.

== See also ==
- Jan Rypka, History of Iranian Literature. Reidel Publishing Company. ASIN B-000-6BXVT-K
- List of Persian poets and authors
- Persian literature
