= Unsuri =

10th/11th-century Persian poet

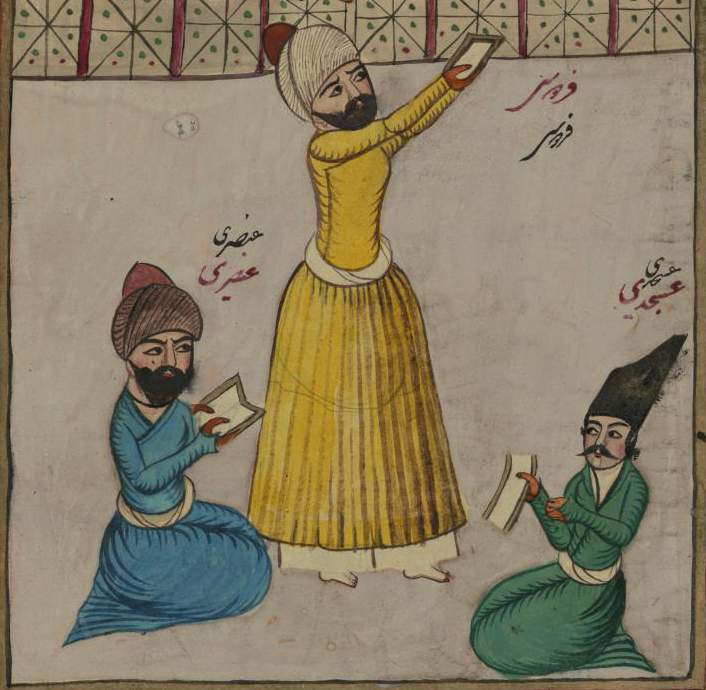
Qajar-era miniature of the poets Ferdowsi, Unsuri, and Asjadi

Abu'l-Qasim Hasan Unsuri Balkhi (Persian: ابوالقاسم حسن عنصری بلخی; died 1039/1040) was a 10th–11th-century Persian poet. Unsuri is said to have been born in Balkh, today located in modern-day Afghanistan, and he eventually became a poet of the royal court of Mahmud of Ghazni, and was given the title Malik us-Shu'ara (King of Poets) under Mahmud. His Divan is said to have contained 30,000 distichs, of which only 2500 remain today. It includes the romance epic Vamiq u 'Adhra, which ultimately derives from the Ancient Greek novel Metiochus and Parthenope.

== See also ==
- List of Persian poets and authors
