= Paul E. Losensky =

Paul Edward Losensky
- Born: 1956 (age 69–70)
- Education: University of Chicago (PhD)
- Scientific career
- Institutions: Indiana University
- Thesis: “Welcoming Fighani: Imitation, Influence, and Literary Change in the Persian Ghazal, 1480–1680 (1993)

Paul E. Losensky (born 1956) is Professor of Comparative Literature and Adjunct Professor of Middle Eastern Languages and Cultures at Indiana University. He received his PhD in Near Eastern Languages and Civilizations from the University of Chicago in 1993. Losensky specializes in Persian literature and literary history.

== Books ==
- In the Bazaar of Love: The Selected Poetry of Amīr Khusrau. Translated with an introduction by Paul E. Losensky and Sunil Sharma. New Delhi: Penguin Books India, 2011; London: Penguin Global, 2012.
- Farid ad-Din ‘Attār's Memorial of God's Friends: Lives and Sayings of Sufis. Translated with an introduction and annotations by Paul Losensky, with a preface by Th. Emil Homerin. Classics of Western Spirituality. New York: Paulist Press, 2009.
- Welcoming Fighānī: Imitation and Poetic Individuality in the Safavid-Mughal Ghazal. Costa Mesa, CA: Mazda Publishers, 1998.
