= Jahanshah Mirza =

Jahanshah Mirza (Persian: جهانشاه میرزا; 1809–1835) was a Qajar prince and poet in 19th-century Iran. He was the son of Fath-Ali Shah Qajar (r. 1797–1834) and his Jewish wife Maryam Khanom (1770–1843). His mother became the 39th royal consort Fath-Ali Shah Qajar; she was reported to have "no rival in beauty".

== Sources ==
- Brookshaw, Dominic Parviz (2006). "Maryam Khanom". In Yarshater, Ehsan (ed.). Encyclopædia Iranica (Online ed.). Encyclopædia Iranica Foundation.
- Taheri, Farhad (2018). "جهانشاه قاجار". The Great Islamic Encyclopaedia (in Persian).
