= Indian style (poetry) =

Literary style in Persian poetry

Indian style, also known as Sabk-i Hindi (Persian: سبک هندی) was a literary style in Persian poetry. The term was coined because poets and writers who were affiliated with Indian courts during the Mughal era were particularly notable for incorporating the characteristics typically associated with this style into their works. Some modern Iranian scholars have recommended using the names "sabk-i Isfahani" or "sabk-i Safavi" instead of sabk-i Hindi (Indian style) because the poets of the Safavid court in Isfahan during the 17th and early 18th century wrote in a similar manner.

== Poets ==
- Ghazali Mashhadi

== See also ==
- Khorasani style (poetry)
- Persian language in the Indian subcontinent

== Sources ==
- de Bruijn, J.T.P. (1995). "Sabk-i, Hindī". In Bosworth, C. E.; van Donzel, E.; Heinrichs, W. P. & Lecomte, G. (eds.). The Encyclopaedia of Islam, Second Edition. Volume VIII: Ned–Sam. Leiden: E. J. Brill. ISBN 978-90-04-09834-3.
