= Bazgasht-e adabi =

18th-century Persian literary style

Bazgasht-e adabi (Persian: بازگشت ادبی, lit. 'Literary Return') is a literary style and movement that emerged in 18th century Iran which advocated a return to Khorasani and Iraqi Ajami styles in Persian literature.

== Sources ==
- Daadbeh, Asghar (2015). "Bāzgasht-i Adabī". In Madelung, Wilferd; Daftary, Farhad (eds.). Encyclopaedia Islamica Online. Brill Online. ISSN 1875-9831.
- Hanaway, William L. (1989). "Bāzgašt-e adabī". In Yarshater, Ehsan (ed.). Encyclopædia Iranica. Vol. IV/1: Bāyju–Behruz. London and New York: Routledge & Kegan Paul. pp. 58–60. ISBN 978-0-71009-124-6.
