= List of Persian-language poets and authors =

The list is not comprehensive, but is continuously being expanded and includes Persian poets as well as poets who write in Persian from Iran, Azerbaijan, Iraq, Georgia, Dagestan, Turkey, Syria, Afghanistan, Turkmenistan, Tajikistan, Uzbekistan, Lebanon, China, Pakistan, India and elsewhere.

== 6th century ==
- Mishdar
- Bamshad
- Nagisa

== From the 7th to the 8th centuries ==
- Bassam Kurd, poet (بَسّام کُرد)
- Abu'l-Abbas Marwazi, poet (ابوالعباس مروزی)

== 9th century ==
- Rudaki, poet, singer, and musician (رودکی)
- Muhammad al-Bukhari Persian Islamic Scholar (810–870) (محمد البخاری)
- Mansur Al-Hallaj (منصور حلاج)
- Shahid Balkhi (ابوالحسن شهید بن حسین جهودانکی بلخی)
- Hanzala Badghisi (حنظله بادغیسی)
- Muhammad ibn Wasif, poet (محمد بن وصیف)
- Abu Hafs Sughdi, poet (ابوحَفْص سُغْدی)
- Abu Ishagh Juybari (ابواسحاق جویباری)
- Abu Zara'a Mumiri
- Abu Salik Gurgani, poet (ابوسلیک گرگانی)
- Abu Shu'aib Heravi, poet (ابوشُعَیب هروی)
- Faralavi, poet (فرالاوی)
- Firuz Mashreqi, poet (پیروز مشرقی/ فیروز مشرقی)
- Varragh Heravi, poet (وَرّاق هروی)

== 10th century ==
- Ferdowsi فردوسی
- Abusaeid Abolkheir ابوسعید ابوالخیر
- Rudaki رودکی
- Abu Mansur Daqiqi ابومنصور دقیقی
- Mansur Al-Hallaj منصور حلاج
- Unsuri عنصری
- Rabi'a Balkhi رابعه بلخی
- Asjadi عَسجَدی
- Farrukhi Sistani فرخی سیستانی
- Isma'il Muntasir اسماعیل منتصیر
- Kisai Marvazi کسائی مروزی
- Abu Shakur Balkhi ابوشکور بلخی
- Abu Tahir Khosrovani (ابوطاهر خسروانی)
- Qabus, Qabus ibn Wushmagir, poet (died 1012) ابوالحسن قابوس بن وشمگیر بن زیار, شمس المعالی
- Ayyuqi عیوقی
- Khwaja Abdullah Ansari خواجه عبدالله انصاری
- Shahid Balkhi شهید بلخی
- Daqiqi دقیقی
- Ma'ruf Balkhi معروف بلخی
- Munjik Tirmidhi
- Li Shunxian (李舜弦) a concubine of the Chinese Emperor Wang Yan (Wang Zongyan)
- Abu Taieb Mosabi
- Aghaji Bukhari
- Abbas Rabenjani
- Abul'Ala Shushtari
- Abul'Muid Balkhi
- Abdullah Junaidi
- Istighnayi Nishaburi
- Badi' Balkhi
- Bashar Marghazi
- Bondar Razi
- Bolmasal Bukhari
- Hakak Marghazi
- Khabazi Nishaburi
- Khusravi Sarkhasi
- Runaqi Bukhari
- Sepehri Bukhari
- Shakir Jalab
- Tahir Chagani
- Tayan Zhazkhay
- Amareh Marvazi
- Qamari Jurjani
- Lokeri
- Abu Ahmad Kateb
- Masoudi Marvazi
- Manteqi Razi

== 11th century ==
- Abu Ishaq of Kazerun, Master Sufi poet (963–1035) ابواسحاق کازرونی
- al-Biruni (973–c. 1050)
- Fakhruddin As'ad Gurgani
- Abu'l Hasan Mihyar al-Daylami (d. 1037)
- Asad Gorgani
- Omar Khayyám, poet (1048–1131)
- Sanai, poet (1080–1131/1141) حکیم ابوالمجد مجدود بن آدم سنایی غزنوی
- Hujviri d1073
- Abdul Qadir Gilani
- Manuchihri
- Abolfazl Beyhaghi, historian
- Abu'l-Hasan Bayhaqi
- Nasir Khusraw, traveler, writer and poet
- Baba Tahir Oryan
- Rabi'ah Quzdari
- Abu-al-faraj Runi
- Keykavus Eskandar
- Nizam al-Mulk, author of Siyasatnama
- Azraqi
- Masud Sa'd Salman
- Uthman Mukhtari
- Qatran Tabrizi
- Asadi Tusi اسدی طوسی
- Imam Muhammad Ghazali
- Abhari
- Uthman Mukhtari
- Athir al-Din Akhsikati
- Kafarak Ghaznavi
- Labibi

== 12th century ==
- Suzani Samarqandi, poet (d. 1166) شمس‌الدینْ محمد بن علی
- Adib Sabir ادیب صابر
- Am'aq عَمْعَق بخارائی
- Anvari انوری اَبیوَردی
- Farid al-Din Attar, poet (1145–1221) فریدالدین عطار نیشابوری/نیشاپوری
- Nizami, poet (c. 1140 – c. 1203) نظامی
- Sheikh Ruzbehan شیخ روزبهان
- Abdul Qadir Gilani عبدالقادر گیلانی
- Khaqani Shirvani خاقانی شروانی
- Sanaayi سنایی
- Sheikh Ahmad Jami
- Muhammad Aufi
- Falaki Shirvani
- Hassan Ghaznavi, poet
- Sanai Ghaznavi, poet
- Mu'izzi
- Ibn Balkhi
- Uthman Mukhtari
- Mahsati, poet مَهْسَتی گنجوی
- Rashid al-Din Muhammad al-Umari Vatvat خواجه رشیدالدین وَطْواط
- Nizami Arudhi Samarqandi نظامی عروضی سمرقندی

== 13th century ==
- Jalal al-Din Muhammad Rumi, poet (1207–1273)
- Fakhr al-Din Iraqi (1213/14 – 1289)
- Sultan Walad
- Saadi, poet (1184–1283/1291?)
- Rashid-al-Din Hamadani (1247–1318)
- Shams Tabrizi
- Sheikh Ruzbehan
- Zahed Gilani
- Khwaju Kermani
- Mahmoud Shabestari
- Najmeddin Razi
- Zartosht Bahram-e Pazhdo
- Muhammad Aufi
- Qazi Beiza'i
- Nizari Quhistani
- Awhadi Maraghai
- Humam-i Tabrizi (1213/14 – 1289)
- Auhaduddin Kermani
- Ghiyas al-Din ibn Rashid al-Din
- Ata-Malik Juvayni
- Nasreddin
- Abu Tawwama (died 1300)
- Kamal al-Din Isfahani
- Afdal al-Din Kashani
- Badr Jajarmi
- Basati Samarqandi
- Keykavus Razi

== 14th century ==
- Hafez, poet (born about 1310–1325) حافظ
- Amir Khusrow, امیر خسرو دهلوی
- Shah Shoja Mozaffari شاه شجاع مظفری
- Ubayd Zakani عبید زاکانی
- Jahan Malek Khatun جهان ملک خاتون
- Pur-Baha Jami پور بهار جامی
- Assar Tabrizi عصار تبریزی
- Mir Sayyid Ali Hamadani, میر سید علی ابن شہاب الدین ہمدانی - Islamic preacher traveller and poet (1314–1384)
- Padishah Khatun پادشاه خاتون
- Kamal Khujandi, poet, Sufism (1321–1401)
- Shahin Shirazi
- Junayd Shirazi
- Qasem-e Anvar
- Saif Farghani (d. 1348)
- Imadaddin Nasimi
- Ghiyasuddin Azam Shah, Sultan of Bengal who jointly penned a Persian poem with Hafez
- Ghiyas al-Din ibn Rashid al-Din
- Shah Nimatullah Wali
- Maghrebi Tabrizi
- Nur Qutb Alam, Bengali religious scholar
- Salman Savaji
- Ibn Nasuh Shirazi
- Sharaf al-Din Ram
- Heydar Shirazi
- Muin al-Din Jovaini
- Junayd Shirazi
- Shahab al-Din Bidavoni
- Naser Bejehie
- Imad al-Din Fazlavi
- Shams al-Din Kashani
- Imad Kermani
- Nizam al-Din Qari
- Jalal Tabib Shirazi
- Jalal Azod
- Hassan Mutekalim
- Rukn Davi-Dar
- Jalal Ukkashe
- Jam Juna I

== 15th century ==
- Jami, poet (1414–1492)
- Ahli Shirazi
- Mir Ali Shir Nava'i, poet (1441–1501)
- Azari Tusi (1380–1462)
- Badriddin Hilali, poet (1470–1529)
- Emrani, poet (1454–1536)
- Fuzûlî, poet (1494–1556)
- Amir Shahi Sabzevari
- Esmat Bukhari
- Sharaf al-Din Sabzevari
- Hamedi Isfahani
- Qbuli Heravi
- Katebi Tarshizi
- Asefi Heravi
- Zana Lorestani (زانا لرستانی)
- Vahid Tabrizi (وحید تبریزی)
- Fahmi Astarabadi

== 16th century ==
- Aghdasi Mashhadi
- Sheikh Bahaii, scientist, architect, philosopher, and poet (1546–1620) (شیخ بهایی)
- Vahshi Bafghi, poet (وحشی بافقی)
- Hatefi, nephew of the poet Jami (هاتفی)
- Taleb Amoli (1586–1627) (طالب آملی)
- Baba Fighani Shirazi (بابا فغانی شیرازی)
- Naw'i Khabushani (نوعی خَبوشانی)
- 'Orfi Shirazi (عرفی شیرازی)
- Faizi (فیضی)
- Mohtasham Kashani (محتشم کاشانی)
- Nahapet Kuchak
- Teimuraz I of Kakheti (Tahmuras Khan)
- Qazi Nurullah Shustari
- Firishta
- Muhammad Zuhuri (died 1616)
- Rafi al-Din Shirazi
- Sanai Mashhadi
- Hazegh Gilani
- Sahabi Astarabadi
- Partovi Shirazi
- Sharaf Jahan Qazvini
- Ghazali Mashhadi
- Fekri Jameh-Baf
- Ghasemi Gonabadi
- Lesani Shirazi
- Meili Mashhadi
- Naziri Nishapuri
- Vali Dashtbayazi
- Darvishi Dahaki
- Nizam Astarabadi
- Heyrati Tuni
- Khajeghi Enayat
- Sabri Isfahani
- Tarhi Shirazi
- Shuja Kor
- Kami Qazvini
- Hejri Qumi
- Heydar Kuliche-Paz
- Abdi Beg Shirazi
- Kahi Kabuli
- Malek Qommi
- Qeidi Shirazi
- Makhdum Sharifi Shirazi
- Nizam al-Din Hashimi
- Gharari Gilani
- Hisabi Natanzi
- Mirak Salehi
- Serfi Savaji
- Hozuri Qumi
- Gheirati Shirazi
- Voghui Nishaburi
- Vahshi Jushghani
- Voghui Tabrizi
- Shuaib Jushghani
- Haydari Tabrizi
- Fosuni Yazdi
- Ali Komrehyi
- Malek Qomi
- Hafiz Tanish, historian and poet (c. 1556 – after 1598) (حافظ تنیش)
- Mirza Manohar Tausani, poet

== 17th century ==
- Saib Tabrizi, poet (1601/02–1677)
- Mohammad Taher Vahid Qazvini (1621–1700)
- Kalim Kashani (1581/1585–1651)
- Mohammad Qoli Salim Tehrani (died 1647)
- Shah Abdur Rahim, Indian religious scholar
- Shah Waliullah Dehlawi, Indian religious leader
- Teimuraz I of Kakheti (Tahmuras Khan)
- Abul Ma'āni Abdul Qader Bedil (1642–1720)
- Guru Gobind Singh (1666–1708), Composed the famous Zafarnamah
- Zeb-un-Nissa Makhfi (1637–1702)
- Razi Danesh Mashadi (died 1665)
- Bhai Nand Lal (1633–1713)
- Gani Kashmiri (c. 1630 – c. 1669)
- Mir Razi Artimani
- Munir Lahori
- Zolali Khansari
- Najib Kashani
- Naziri Nishapuri
- Tasir Tabrizi
- Qasem Mashhadi
- Masih Kashani
- Vaez Qazvini
- Qudsi Mashhadi
- Zafarkhan Hasan
- Mir Nejat Isfhani
- Elahi Hamadani
- Shifa'i Isfahani
- Mirza Mohsen Ta'sir Tabrizi
- Jamileh Esfahani

== 18th century ==
- Shah Abdul Aziz Dehlavi, Indian religious scholar (شاه عبدالعزیز دهلوی)
- Azar Bigdeli (آذر بیگدلی)
- Ram Mohan Roy, Bengali Hindu reformer (رام موهَن رای)
- Hazin Lahiji (حزین لاهیجی)
- Izzatullah Bengali (عزّت‌الله بنگالی), author
- Hatef Esfehani, poet (هاتف اصفهانی)
- Lutfullah Tabrizi (لطف‌الله تبریزی)
- Mirza Asadullah Khan Ghalib (میرزا اسداللہ خان غالب)
- Zayn al-Abidin Shirvani (زین‌العابدین شیروانی)
- I'tisam-ud-Din, Bengali diplomat (اعتصام الدین)
- Ghulam Mustafa Burdwani, Bengali religious scholar and poet (غلام مصطفی بردوانی)
- Vahdat Kermanshahi
- Vesal Shirazi
- Abbas Foroughi Bastami
- Yaghma Jandaqi
- Neshat Esfahani
- Kosar Hamedani
- Sabahi Bigdeli
- Nategh Makrani

== 19th century ==
- Agha Ahmad Ali, Bengali poet (آغا احمد علی)
- Mohammad-Taghi Bahar, Malek o-Sho'arā Bahār محمدتقی بهار(مَلِک‌الشعراء)
- Mastoureh Kordestani (مستوره کُردستانی)
- Ali Akbar Dehkhoda, linguist and journalist علی‌اکبر دهخدا
- Mirza Asadullah Khan Ghalib مرزا اسد اللہ خان غالب
- Hamza Hakimzade Niyazi, poet, author, scholar (1889–1929)
- Mirzadeh Eshghi میرزاده عشقی
- Reza-Qoli Khan Hedayat, poet and historian رضاقلی خان هدایت
- Iraj Mirza ایرج میرزا
- Nassakh, Bengali poet (نساخ)
- Mohammad Taqi Sepehr (محمدتقی سپهر)
- Ebrahim Poordavood, ancient languages, Avesta ابراهیم پور داوود
- Aref Qazvini عارف قزوینی
- Hassan Roshdieh حسن رشدیه
- Siyyid ‘Ali Muhammad Shirazi, founder of Babism, سید علی‌محمد شیرازی
- Táhirih Qorrat al-'Ayn, Babi poet and theologian
- Mirza Husayn 'Ali Nuri, founder of the Baha’i Faith (میرزا حسین‌علی نوری)
- Farrokhi Yazdi فرخی یزدی
- Khwaja Ahsanullah, Kashmiri-Dhakaiya poet (خواجه احسن‌الله)
- Khwaja Muhammad Afzal, Kashmiri-Dhakaiya poet (خواجه محمد افضل)
- Sheyda Gerashi, poet and Panegyrist (شیدای گراشی)
- Qaani قاآنی
- Faiz Muhammad Kateb, known as Afghanistan's father of historians (فیض محمد کاتب)
- Abd al-Hosayn Ayati, poet, orator, author, and historian (عبدالحسین آیتی)
- Ubaidullah Al Ubaidi Suhrawardy, Bengali poet (عبیدالله العبیدی سهروردی)

== 20th century ==
- Ali Abdolrezaei (علی عبدالرضایی)
- Abdolali Dastgheib, author (عبدالعلی دست‌غیب)
- Abdumalik Bahori, Tajik-Persian poet
- Abdolkarim Soroush, philosopher
- Abolghasem Lahouti, communist poet (ابوالقاسم لاهوتی)
- Adib Boroumand, poet, politician, and lawyer (ادیب برومند)
- Ahmad Kamyabi Mask, writer and translator (احمد کامیابی مَسْک)
- Ahmad Kasravi (احمد کسروی)
- Ahmad NikTalab, poet and linguist (احمد نیک‌طلب)
- Ahmad Raza Khan (احمدرضا خان)
- Ahmad Shamlou (احمد شاملو), poet
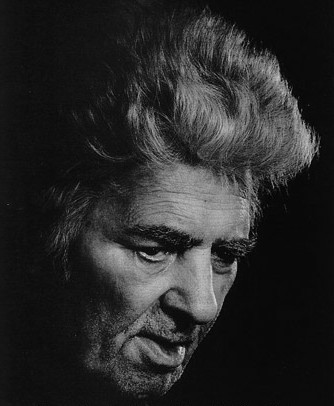
  Ahmad Shamlou
- Akram Fahimian, poet (اکرم فهیمیان)
- Ali Akbar Dehkhoda, linguist (علی‌اکبر دهخدا)
- Ali Mohammad Afghani, writer (علی‌محمد افغانی)
- Ali Shariati, sociologist and theologian (علی شریعتی)
- Aref Qazvini (عارف قزوینی)
- Asad Gulzoda, poet
- Aziz Motazedi, novelist (عزیز معتضدی)
- Bahman Sholevar, writer and poet (بهمن شعله‌ور)
- Bahram Bayzai, playwright (بهرام بیضایی)
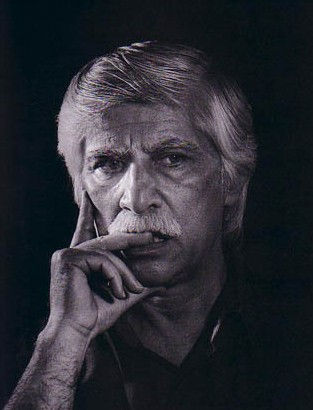
  Bahram Bayzai
- Bijan Elahi, poet and translator
- Bilal Yousaf, writer, critic
- Bozor Sobir, poet (بازارصابر)
- Bozorg Alavi, writer (بزرگ علوی)
- Dariush Shayegan (داریوش شایگان)
- Ebrahim Nabavi, satirist (ابراهیم نبوی)
- Ehsan Naraghi, scholar, sociologist and writer
- Esmail Khoi, poet
- Ezzat Goushegir
- Farzona, poet (Fаrzonа/فرزانه)
- Farzaneh Aghaeipour (فرزانه آقایی‌پور)
- Fereidoon Tavallali, poet (فریدون توللی)
- Fereshteh Ahmadi, writer (فرشته احمدی)
- Fereydoun Moshiri, poet (فریدون مشیری)
- Forough Farrokhzad, poet (فروغ فرخزاد)
- Ghazaleh Alizadeh, novelist (غزاله علیزاده)
- Gholam Hossein Saedi, writer
- Gholamhossein Mosahab, encyclopedist (غلامحسین مصاحب)
- Gholamreza Rouhani, poet (غلامرضا روحانی)
- Gulnazar Keldi, Tajik poet
- Hamid Mosadegh (حمید مصدق)
- Hassan Roshdieh (حسن رشدیه)
- Hassan Kamshad
- Heydar Raqabi (حیدر رقابی)
- Heydar Yaghma (حیدر یغما)
- Homaira Nakhat Dastgirzada (حمیرا نکهت دستگیرزاده)
- Houshang Golshiri (هوشنگ گلشیری)
- Houshang Moradi Kermani (هوشنگ مرادی کرمانی)
- Hushang Ebtehaj (H. A. Sayeh) (هوشنگ ابتهاج)
- Ibrahim Ali Tashna, Bengali poet (تشنه)
- Ismail Alam, Bengali poet (اسماعیل عالم)
- Iraj Mirza, poet (ایرج میرزا)
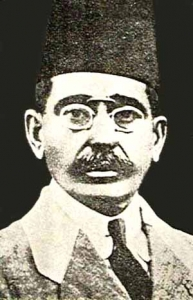
  Iraj Mirza
- Iraj Pezeshkzad, novelist (ایرج پزشکزاد)
- Jalal Al-e-Ahmad (جلال آل احمد)
- Zhaleh Amouzegar (ژاله آموزگار)
- Kazim Yazdani, author and historian (حاج کاظم یزدانی)
- Khalilullah Khalili, poet and writer (خلیل‌الله خلیلی)
- Kioumars Saberi Foumani (کیومرث صابری فومنی)
- Lāyiq Shēralī (لائق شیرعلی), poet from Tajikistan
- Leila Kasra, poet and lyricist
- Mahbod Seraji, writer (مهبد سراجی)
- Mahmoud Dowlatabadi (محمود دولت آبادی)
- Mahmoud Melmasi - Azarm, poet (محمود ملماسی، آزرم)
- Majid Adibzadeh, writer and scholar (مجید ادیب‌زاده)
- Majid M. Naini, writer, poet, translator, speaker (مجید نایینی)
- Mana Aghaee, poet, author and translator (مانا آقایی)
- Manouchehr Atashi (منوچهر آتشی)
- Marjane Satrapi, graphic novelist
- Maryam Jafari Azarmani, poet, critic (مریم جعفری آذرمانی)
- Massoud Behnoud (مسعود بهنود), journalist
- Mehdi Akhavan-Sales, poet (مهدی اخوان ثالث)
- Mina Assadi, poet, author, journalist, and songwriter (مینا اسدی)
- Mina Dastgheib, poet (مینا دست‌غیب)
- Rosa Jamali, poet, playwright, translator
- Mirzadeh Eshghi (میرزاده عشقی)
- Mirzo Tursunzoda, Tajik poet
- Mohammad Ali Jamalzadeh, writer and novelist (محمدعلی جمالزاده)
- Mohammad Hejazi, novelist and playwright
- Mohammad Hossein Shahriar, poet (محمدحسین شهریار)
- Mohammad Jafar Pouyandeh (محمدجعفر پوینده)
- Mohammad Mokhtari (محمد مختاری)
- Mohammad Reza Ali Payam (Haloo), poet (محمدرضا عالی‌پیام)
- Mohammad Reza Shafiei-Kadkani, poet (محمدرضا شفیعی کدکنی)
- Mohammad-Amin Riahi, scholar and writer (محمدامین ریاحی)
- Mohammad-Reza Shafiei-Kadkani, poet
- Mohammad-Taghi Bahar, poet(محمدتقی بهار)
- Monica Malek-Yonan, playwright
- Morteza Motahhari, theologian (مرتضی مطهری)
- Muhammad Faizullah, Bengali poet (محمد فیض‌الله)
- Muhammad Iqbal, Pakistani poet (محمد اقبال)
- Nader Naderpour, poet (نادر نادرپور)
- Nasrollah Mardani, poet (نصرالله مردانی)
- Nima Yushij, poet (نیما یوشیج)
- Nosrat Rahmani, poet (نصرت رحمانی)
- Parvin E'tesami, poet (پروین اعتصامی)
- Qasim Akhgar, author, journalist and political activist (قسیم اخگر)
- Rahi Mo'ayeri, poet (رهی معیری)
- Reza Baraheni, poet and critic (رضا براهنی)
- Reza Khoshnazar, novelist (رضا خوش‌بین خوش‌نظر)
- Reza Gholi Khan Hedayat, poet and historian (رضاقلی‌خان هدایت)
- Reza Shirmarz, playwright, author, translator, poet and essayist (رضا شیرمرز)
- Roya Hakakian, poet, writer, journalist (رؤیا حکاکیان)
- Saboktakin Saloor, novelist
- Sadegh Choubak, writer (صادق چوبک)
- Sadegh Hedayat (صادق هدایت)
- Sadriddin Ayni (صدرالدین عینی), Tajikistan's national poet and one of the most important writers of the country's history.
- Saeed Nafisi, scholar, poet and writer
- Sahar Delijani, novelist (سحر دلیجانی)
- Samad Behrangi, writer (صمد بهرنگی)
- Seyed Ali Salehi, poet
- Sems Kesmai, poet (شمس کسمایی)
- Shahrnush Parsipur, novelist (شهرنوش پارسی‌پور)
- Shams Langeroodi, poet (شمس لنگرودی)
- Shamim Hashimi, poet and writer (شمیم ہاشمی)
- Shapour Bonyad, poet (شاپور بنیاد)
- Sheema Kalbasi, poet and translator (شیما کلباسی)
- Siavash Kasraie, poet (سیاوش کسرایی)
- Simin Behbahani, poet (سیمین بهبهانی)
- Simin Daneshvar, writer (سیمین دانشور)
- Sipandi Samarkandi, Tajik bilingual poet
- Sohrab Sepehri, poet and painter (سهراب سپهری)
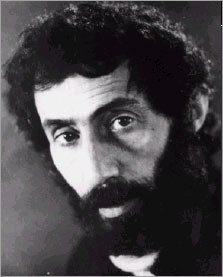
  Sohrab Sepehri
- Syed Waheed Ashraf, poet, Sufi, scholar, critic
- Syed Abid Ali Abid, poet and author
- Temur Zulfiqorov, Tajik poet (Temur Zulfiqorov)
- Varand, poet (واراند)
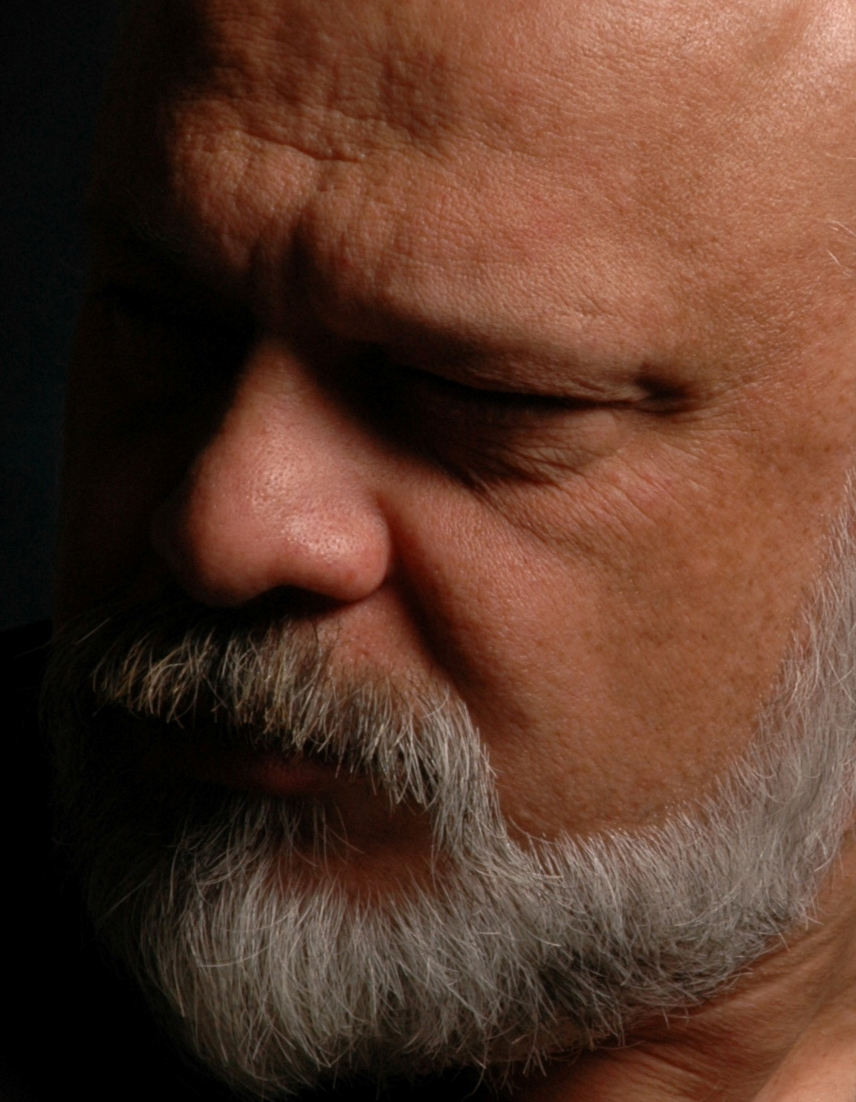
  Varand
- Yadollah Royaee, poet (یدالله رویایی)
- Hossein Rajabian, playwright (حسین رجبیان)
- Yasmina Reza, poet (یاسمینا رضا)
- Zoya Pirzad, novelist (زویا پیرزاد)
- Niloufar Talebi (نیلوفر طالبی)
- Sholeh Wolpé, poet, playwright (شعله ولپی)
- Iraj Zebardast, poet (ایرج زبردست)

== See also ==
- List of Iranian writers
