= Farzaneh =

Farzaneh (Persian: فرزانه, romanized: Farzāna), also transliterated as Farzana, Farzona or Farzane; or Parzaneh (Persian: پرزانه, romanized: Parzāna, lit. 'wise, intelligent, or highly knowledgeable'), also transliterated as Parzana, Parzona or Parzane; is a Persian given name for girls common in Iran, as well in the Indian subcontinent (i.e., South Asia), and Central Asia. The masculine equivalent is Farzan. Notable people with these names include:

== Given name ==
- Farzana (actress), Indian actress
- Farzona (born 1964), Tajik poet and writer
- Farzaneh Aghaeipour, Iranian playwright
- Farzana Bari (born 1957), Pakistani feminist, human rights activist and academic
- Farzana Doctor, Canadian novelist and social worker
- Farzaneh Fasihi (born 1993), Iranian athlete
- Farzana Hassan, Pakistani-Canadian author, speaker, and human rights activist
- Farzana Hoque (born 1993), Bangladeshi cricketer who plays for the Bangladesh national women's cricket team
- Farzana Praveen (died 2014), Pakistani woman murdered in 2014
- Farzaneh Kaboli (born 1949), Iranian dancer
- Farzana Raja (born 1970), Pakistani politician
- Farzaneh Ta'idi (1945–2020), Iranian actress

== Surname ==
- Paria Farzaneh, English-Iranian fashion designer
- Sharlin Farzana (born 1990), Bangladeshi model and actress

== See also ==
- Ferezneh, village in Iran also Romanized as Farzaneh
