= Farghānī =

Farghānī (Persian: فرغانی, meaning from Farghāna), or Al-Farghani is a common surname in Central and Western Asia and was a common nisbat in the medieval Islamic world. It may refer to the following:

- Ahmad ibn Muhammad ibn Kathīr al-Farghānī, also known as Alfraganus, a 9th-century astronomer
- Rustum ibn Bardu al-Farghani, 10th-century Abbasid commander and governor of Tarsus
- Siraj al-Din al-Ushi al-Farghani, 12th century Hanafi-Maturidi scholar
- Sayf-i Farghānī, a 13th-century Persian poet
- Sa'id al-Din Farghani, a 13th-century Sufi author
- Abu Abdullah b. Ahmad b. Ja'far al-Farghani, the student of al-Tabari who wrote the appendix, al-Sila, to History of the Prophets and Kings.

== See also ==
- Fergani (disambiguation), a surname of North African origin
