= Farzan =

Farzan (Persian: فرزان, romanized: Farzān), or Parzan (Persian: پرزان, romanized: Parzān); is a Persian given name for boys common in Iran, as well in the Indian subcontinent (i.e., South Asia), and Central Asia. The feminine equivalent is Farzaneh/Farzana. Its Turkish derivation is the unisex given name Ferzan.

Notable people with these names include:

- Junior Farzan Ali (born 1980), Fijian boxer
- Farzan Ashourzadeh (born 1996), Olympic taekwondo practitioner
- Farzan Athari (born 1984), Persian model
- Antonia Noori Farzan, American journalist
- Raja Farzan (born 1995), Pakistani cricketer
- Yasaman Farzan (born 1977), Iranian physicist
- Parzaan Dastur (born 1991), Indian actor
