= Gerashi =

Gerashi is a surname. Notable people with the surname include:

- Fatema Hameed Gerashi (born 1987 or 1988), Bahraini swimmer
- Sheyda Gerashi (1879–1920), Iranian poet
