= Qazi Beiza'i =

Qazi Naser al-Din Abdollah ibn Amr was a late 13th century judge and scholar of Iran. His famous work, Nezam al-Tawarikh contains an historical account of Fars province.

== References used ==
- E.G. Browne. Literary History of Persia. (Four volumes, 2,256 pages, and twenty-five years in the writing). 1998. ISBN 0-7007-0406-X
- Jan Rypka, History of Iranian Literature. Reidel Publishing Company. ASIN B-000-6BXVT-K

== See also ==
- List of Persian poets and authors
- Persian literature
