= Abu Hafs Sughdi =

Iranian poet and musician (9th-10th century CE)

Abu Hafs Sughdi (Persian: ابوحفص سغدی) was an Iranian poet and musician of the late-third/ninth to early-fourth/tenth century. Not much is known about his life. But, it is believed that Abu Hafs was the first poet to write poetry in the New Persian language. He was possibly the inventor of the musical instrument called the shahrūd (شاهرود). According to some primary sources, he was the author of an Arabic-Persian dictionary, which is lost today, but was available as late as the 11th century AH. It is also possible that the author of this dictionary was another person also named Abu Hafs.

Shams-i Qays-i Razi is the first person who mentioned Abu Hafs in al-Muʿjam fī maʿāyīr ashʿār al-ʿajam. He claimed that Abu Hafs was the first Persian poet. Later biographers of Abu Hafs repeated this claim, but it is known that there were some other Persian poets during the Tahirid and Saffarid era who lived before Abu Hafs, like Muhammad ibn Wasif, Abu'l-Abbas Marwazi, Hanzala Badghisi.
