= Shamim Hashimi =

Indian Urdu and Persian poet (born 1947)

Shamim Hashimi شمیم ہاشمی
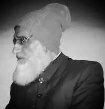
- Shamim Hashimi
- Born: 14 August 1947 (age 79); Sasaram, Bihar, India
- Occupation: Poet
- Writing career
- Pen name: Hashimi, Shamim
- Genre: Ghazal
- Subjects: Islam, Nostalgia, philosophy, Urdu literature

Shamim Hashimi (Urdu/Persian/Arabic: شمیم ہاشمی; Hindi: शमीम हाशिमी; born Syed Muhammad Shamimuddin on 14 August 1947) is an Urdu and Persian poet. He is basically a poet of Ghazal. He has also written poems of other forms of poetry in different meters.

== Personal life ==
Hashimi was born in Sasaram, Bihar, India. He received his primary education in Madrasa Khanqaah kabeeriya. He obtained "Aalim" (Graduation) at the age of 15. He pursued Fazil (Persian and Urdu) from Madrasa Shams-ul-Huda, Patna. After completing his studies from madrasa he joined Patna University and obtained master's degree in Urdu language & literature and Dip. in Ed. He received the degree of Doctor of Philosophy for his research thesis on the life of a poet Mahjoor Shamsi. He is from the Daagh Dehlvi school of Urdu poetry and is one of the disciples of Abr Ahsani Gunnauri. His pen name is Shamim Hashimi.

== Career ==
Hashimi began writing poems at the age of 9. His poems and prose were published in national magazines of Urdu literature like Funoon, Shair, Aaj kal and subh-e-naw-patna etc. He has written many books in Urdu, Persian and English, including collections of his Urdu and Persian Ghazals. His major literary work was published in the 1970s. One of his best books Toot tay patton ka dukh was published in 2005 which has widely been appreciated. He has also received Sahitya Bhushan and Bihar Urdu academy award.

His writing influences include Meer Taqi Meer and Amir Khusrow.

== Views of contemporaries ==
Shabab Lalit: "...Shamim Hashimi is the narrator of the joy of grief. He is a reflector of his pain along with the grief of the universe and agony of the present. On the broad canvas of human life Shamim Hashimi has deeply felt and spiritually experienced the agony of present, unevenness of time and atrocities..."
Nadim Balkhi: "...the main subject of the poems of Shamim Hashimi is Nostalgia which symbolises the complete inner and outer human world..."
Shamsur Rahman Faruqi: "...You have the tradition of intellect from the family of your mother and from that of your father as well and these two qualities are reflected in your poetry at a lot of places..."

== Awards ==
- Sahitya Bhushan
- Bihar Urdu academy award

== Bibliography ==
Persian

- Collection of Persian Ghazals.
- "Farsi ki pahli kitab" The course text book for inter college (Bihar board) and Magadh University 1973.
- Taaleef "Faryaad-e-raghib".
- Talkheez-e-sher-ul-'ajam.

Urdu

- Collection of ghazals "Toot-tay Patton Ka Dukh.".
- Sahsaraam me Urdu shayari ki ibtada-o-irtiqaa (evolution of Urdu poetry in Sahsaraam.).
- Insaniyat ka Islami Tasawwur. (Meaning of humanity in Islam).
- Kulliyaat-e-Mahjoor Shamsi. (Works on Mahjoor Shamsi).

== See also ==
- Islam
- List of Persian poets and authors
- List of Urdu language poets
- Urdu poetry
- List of Muslim philosophers
- Ghalib Academy, New Delhi
