= Varka and Golshah =

11th century Persian epic by Ayyuqi

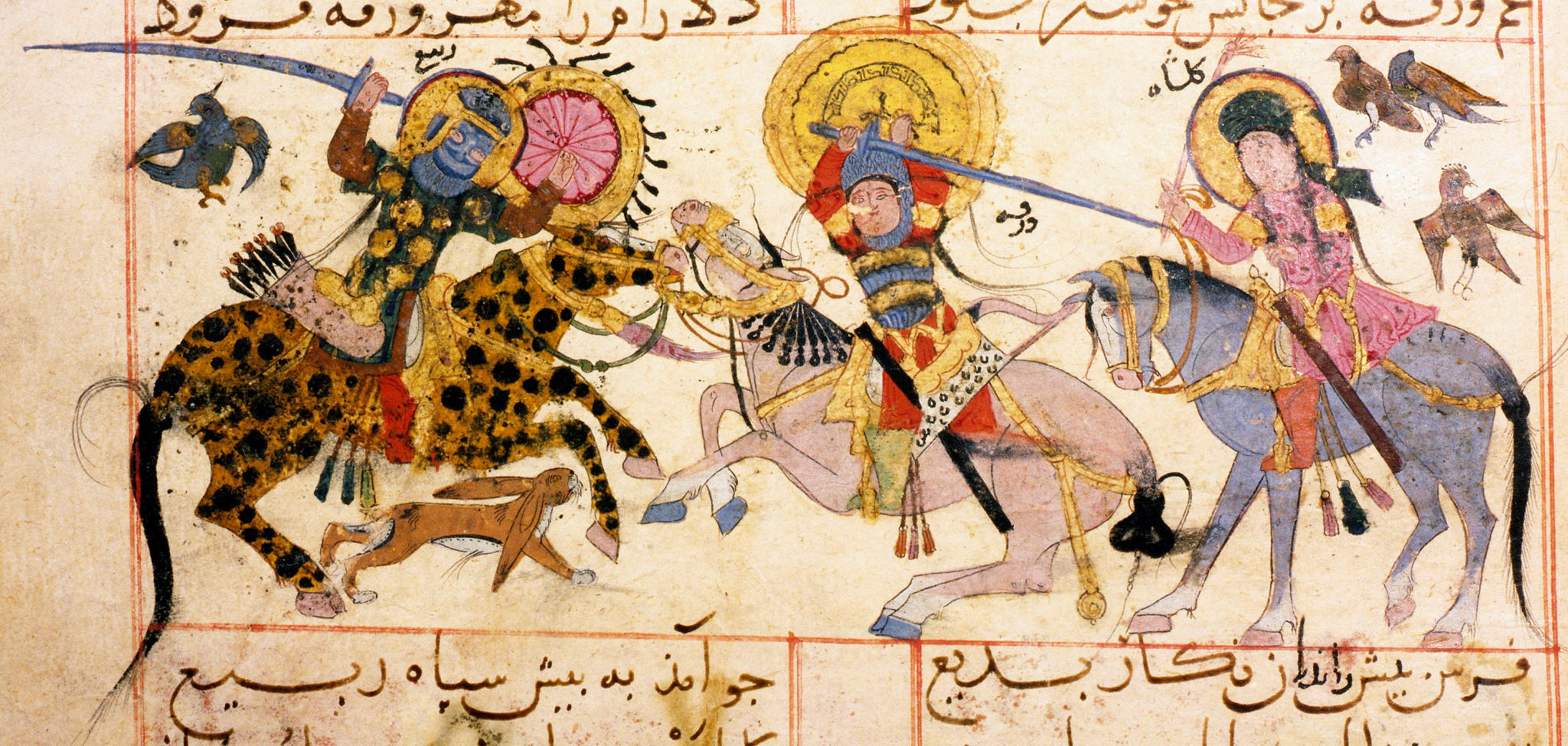
Gulshah (right) disguised as a man, watches as her lover Varqa (centre) and his rival Rabi (left) fight on horseback. Varka and Golshah, mid-13th century miniature, Seljuk Anatolia

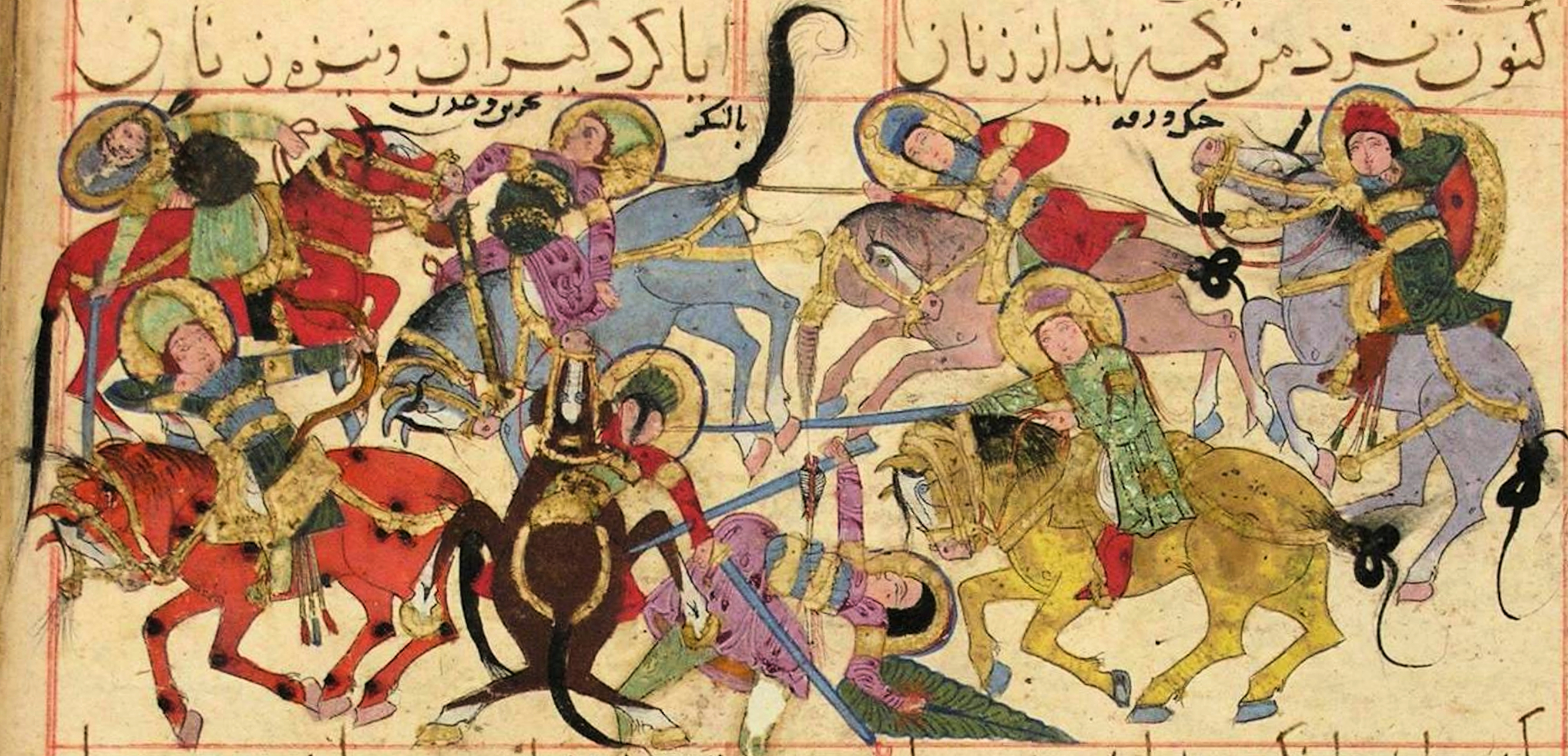
Combat of Warqah with the army of Bahrain and of ‘Adan. Varka and Golshah, mid-13th century miniature, Seljuk Anatolia

Varka and Golshah, also Varqeh and Gulshah, Varqa o Golšāh (ورقه و گلشاه, Varqa wa Golshāh), is an 11th-century Persian epic in 2,250 verses, written by the poet Ayyuqi. In the introduction, the author eulogized the famous Ghaznavid ruler Mahmud of Ghazni (r.998–1030).

The epic is a translation of a Greek romance, with a similar setup to Longus' Daphnis and Chloe. Varka and Golshah inspired the French medieval romantic story Floris and Blancheflour.

== Story ==
The epic is the story of the love between a youth named Varqa and a maiden, Golshah. Their fathers are Arab brothers, Homām and Helāl, chiefs of the tribe of the Banū Šabīh. When Varka and Golshah were supposed to be married, Golshah was abducted by an enemy named Rabīʿ b. ʿAdnān. Various battles ensued, and Varqa's father and Rabīʿ and his two sons are killed, until Golshah was finally rescued. The wedding though is cancelled by Golshah's father, who claims that Varqa is too poor. In order to get rich, Varqa goes to the court of his maternal uncle, Monḏer king of the Yemen. Meanwhile, the king of Syria obtains Golshah's hand from her mother. When Varqa returns as a rich man, he is told that Golsha is dead, but he finds out that this is a lie. He goes to Syria to confront the king, but is treated with such kindness by him that he feels obliged to give up on Golshah. He dies of grief soon after. Golshah goes to his grave, and there dies of grief too. Their twin tombs became a place of pilgrimage for both Jews and Muslims. A year later the Prophet Moḥammad visited the tombs, and resurrected Varqa and Golsha, at last reunited.

== Unique 13th century edition with miniatures ==
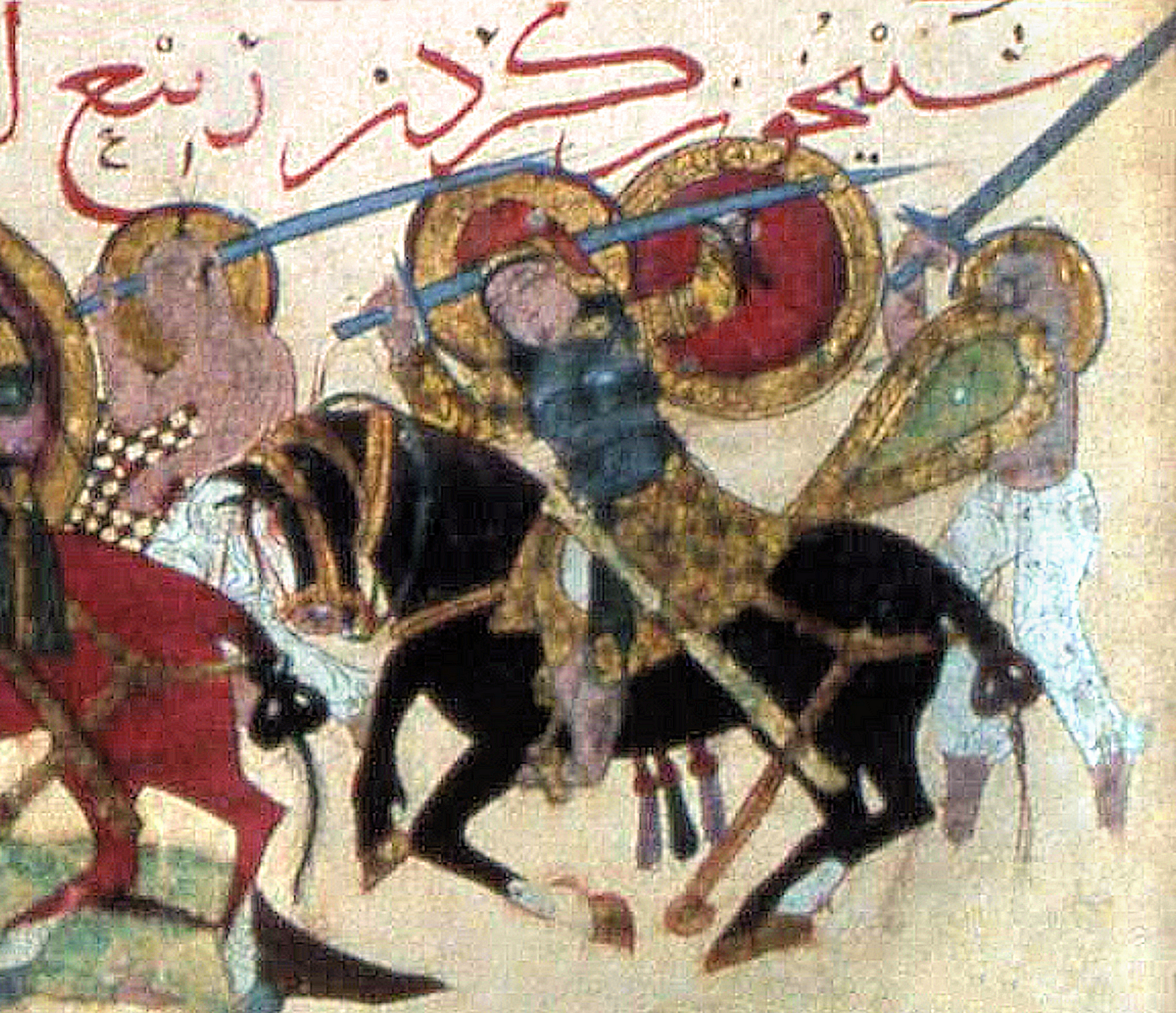
Rabi, armoured with lamellar Jawshan cuirass and mail hauberk beneath his tunic, armed with long single-edged sword and large round shield. Supported by infantrymen with kite-shaped shields

The only known manuscript is a 13th-century edition, generally held to be a product of early 13th-century Seljuks. It is the earliest known illustrated manuscript in the Persian language, and was most probably created in Konya.

The miniatures represent typical Central Asian people, thickset with large round heads. The author of the miniatures in the manuscript is the painter Abd ul-Mumin al-Khoyi, born in the city of Khoy in the Azerbaijan region. The manuscript was completed in Konya, under the Seljuk Sultanate of Rum. It is now located in the Topkapi Museum (Topkapı Sarayı Müzesi, Hazine 841 H.841). It can be dated to circa 1250.

=== Weaponry ===
The paintings from the manuscript provide rare depictions of the contemporary military of the Seljuk period, and may have influenced other known depictions of Turkic Seljuk soldiers. All depicted costumes and accoutrements are contemporary to the artist, in the 13th century CE. The miniatures constitute the first known example of illustrated Persian-language manuscript, dating from the pre-Mongol era, and are useful in studying weapons of the period. Particularly, metal face masks and chainmail helmets in Turkic fashion, and armor with small metal plates connected through straps, large round shields (the largest of them called "kite-shields") and long teardrop shields, armoured horses are depicted. The weapons and armour types depicted in the miniatures were common in the Middle East and the Caucasus in the Seljuk era.

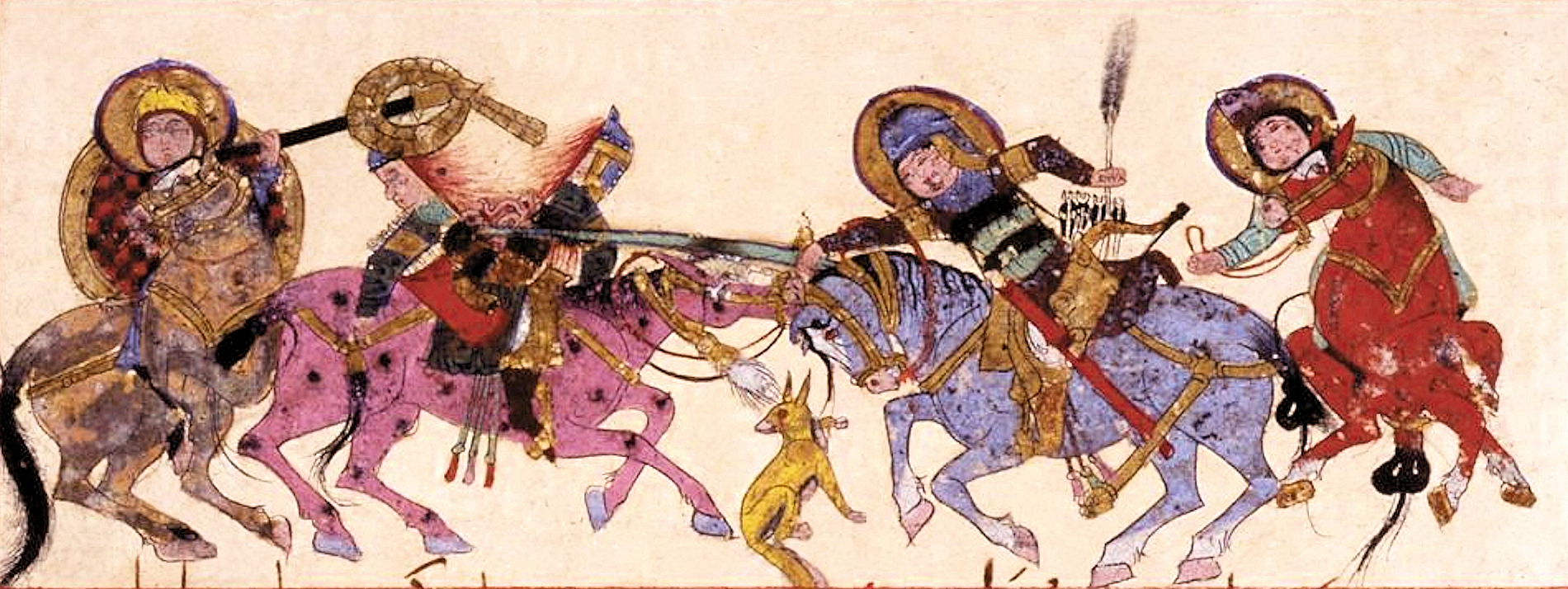
Rabī‘ cuts the head of his adversary. Battle scene, in Varka and Golshah, mid-13th century Seljuk Anatolia.

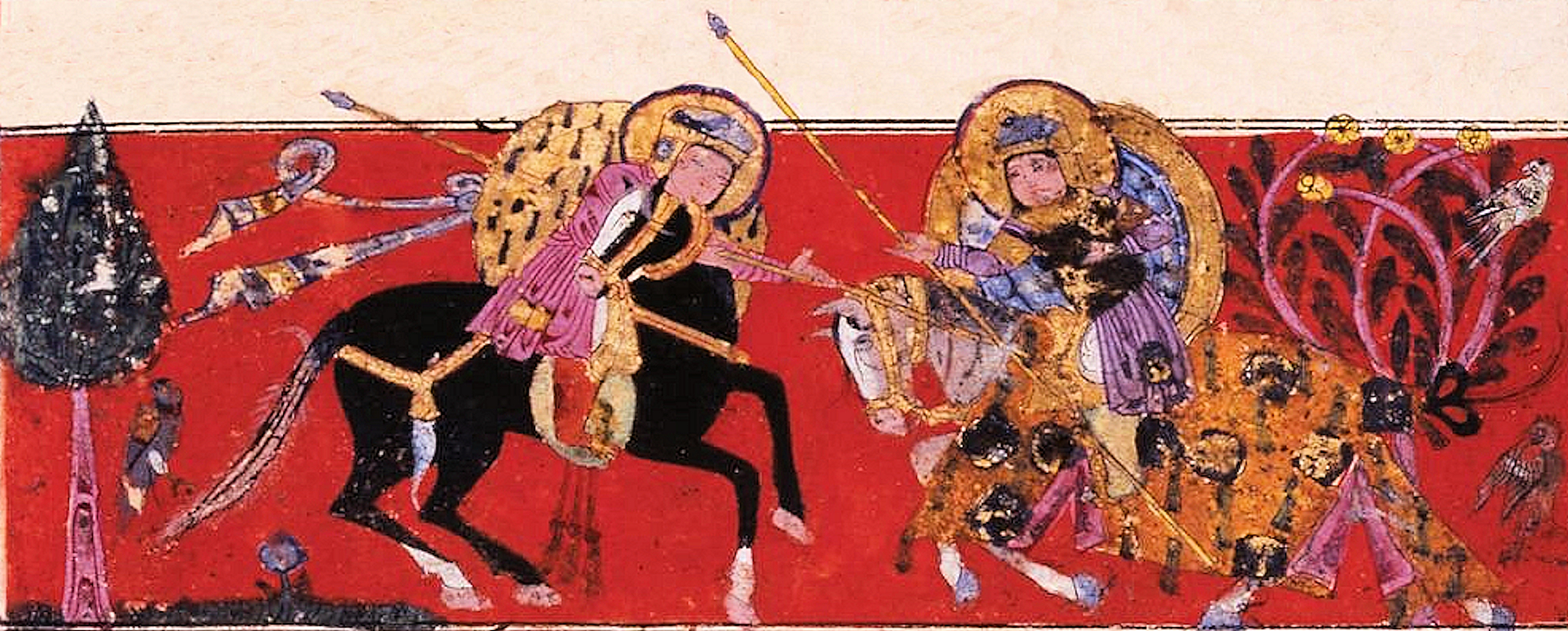
Rabi wounds Varqa in the thigh. Varka and Golshah, mid-13th century Seljuk Anatolia

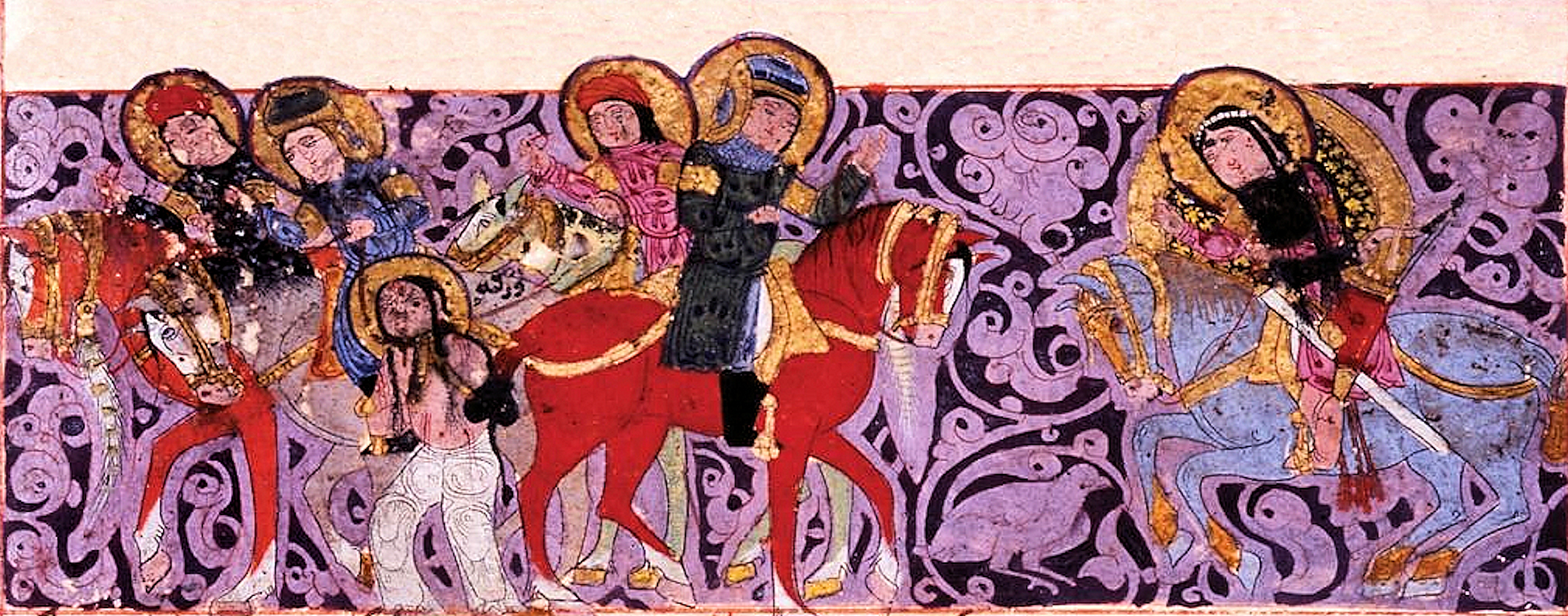
Gulshah (right) disguised as a man, confronts the kidnapper Rabi. Behind, Varqa is wounded and bound. Varka and Golshah, mid-13th century Seljuk Anatolia

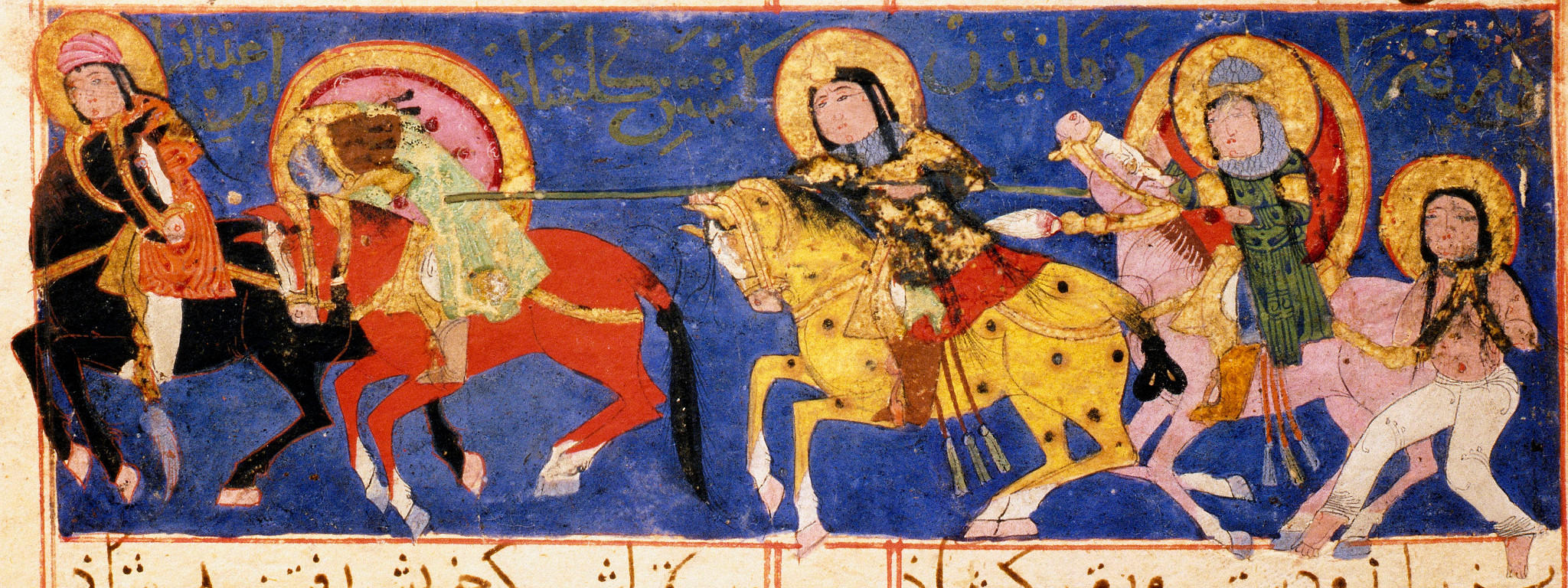
Gulshah kills Rabi ibn Adnan with her lance. Behind her is her defeated lover Varqa, wounded and bound

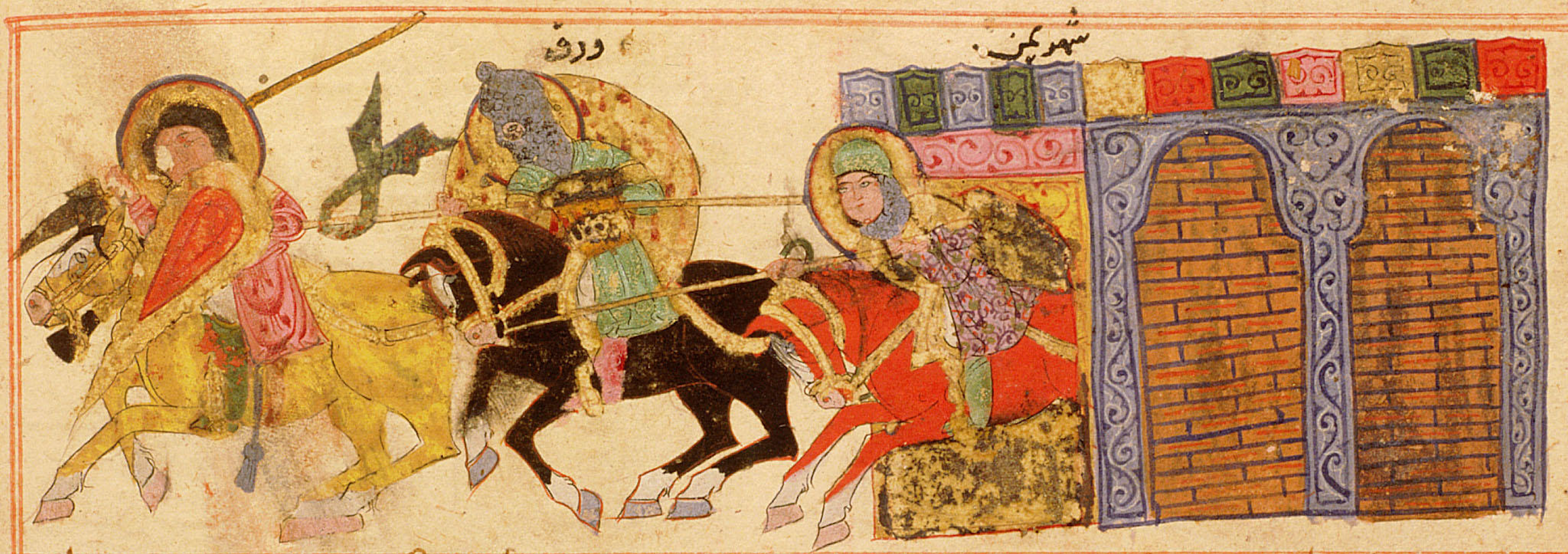
Exit of the armed Warqah from the walls of Yemen, flanked by two riders (37, 35b)

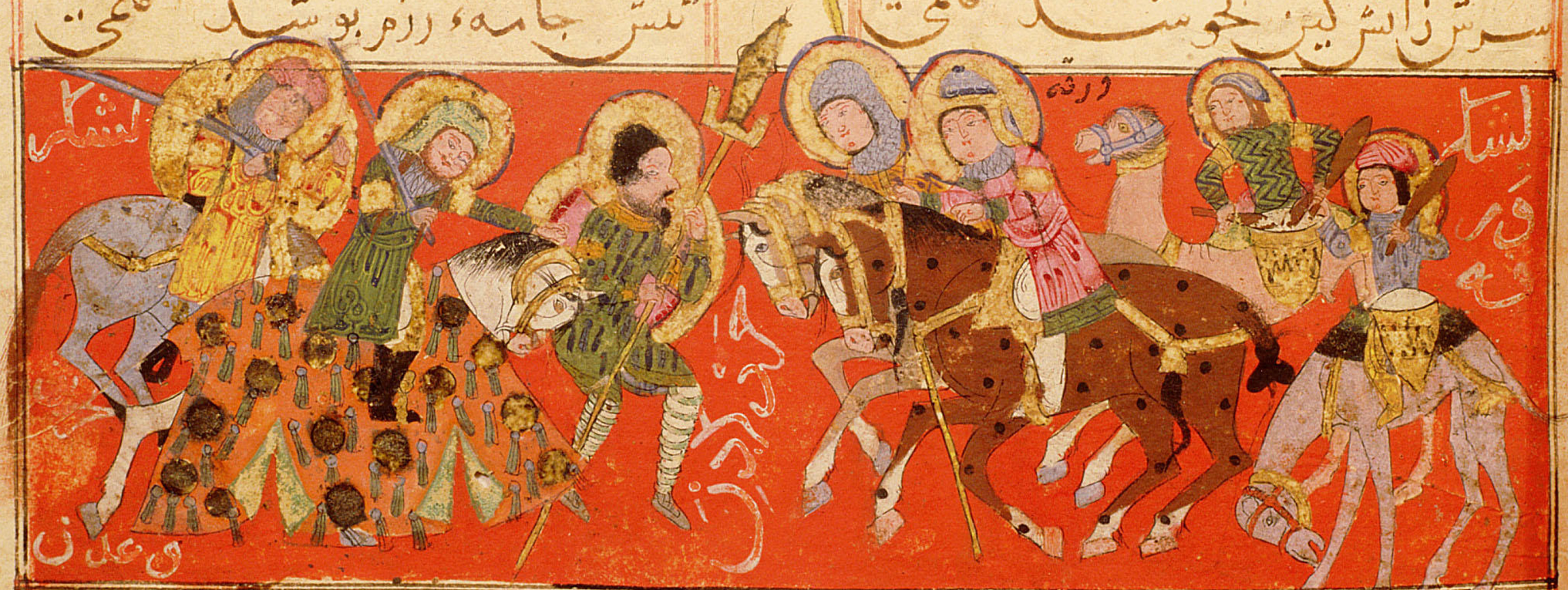
The army of Warqah scatters that of Bahrain and of ‘Adan

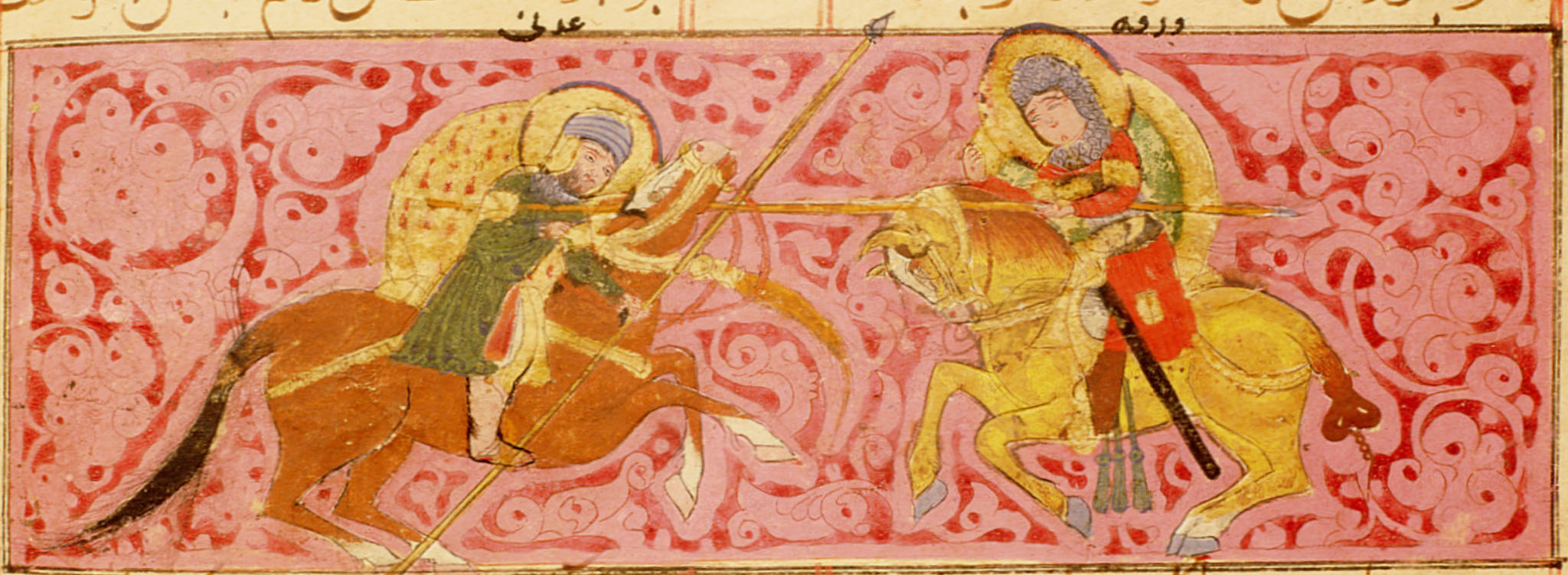
Warqa overthrows a warrior of Aden

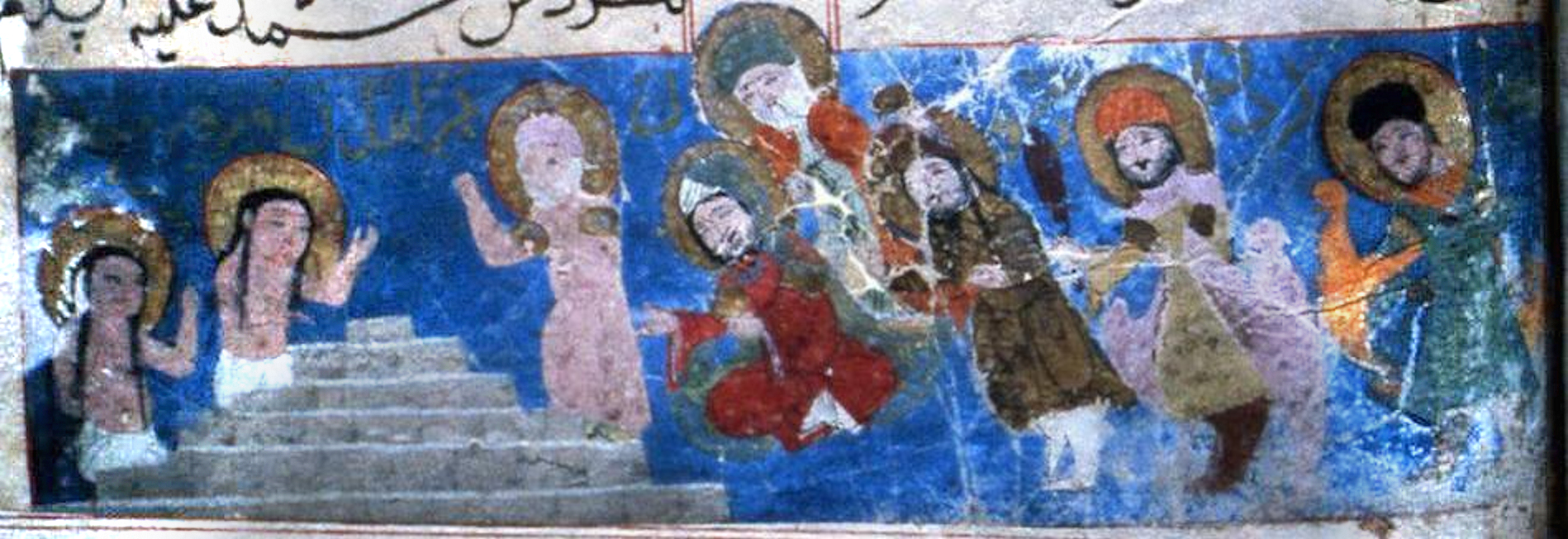
Resurrection of Warqah and Gulshāh by the Prophet. Behind him his four friends and future caliphs, and the king of Shām (Syria).

== Sources ==
- Hillenbrand, Carole (2021). The Medieval Turks: Collected Essays. Edinburgh University Press. ISBN 978-1474485944.
