= Ferzan =

Ferzan is a given name or surname. The Turkish unisex given name Ferzan, is derived from the Persian masculine given name Farzan.

Notable people with the name include:

== Given name ==
- Ferzan Önder (born 1965), Turkish-Austrian pianist
- Ferzan Özpetek (born 1959), Turkish-Italian film director and screenwriter

== Surname ==
- Marc Ferzan, American attorney
