= Ayyuqi =

11th-century Persian poet

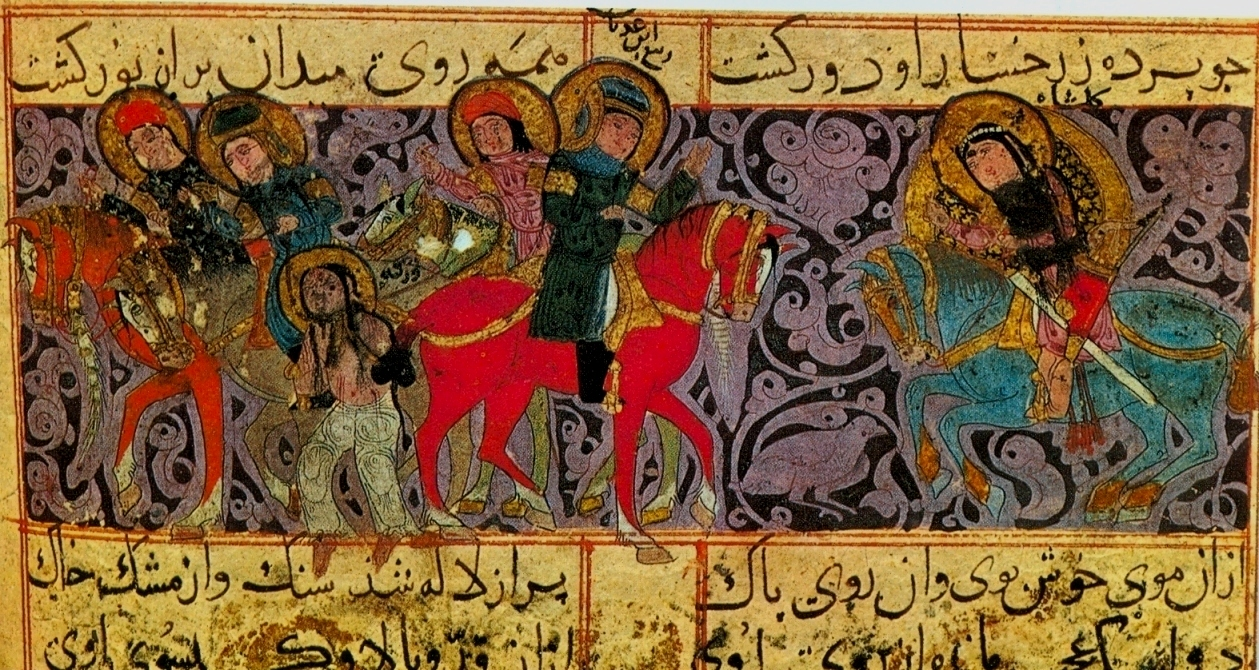
Varqa u Gulshāh

Ayyuqi (Persian: عیوقی) was an 11th-century Persian poet. A contemporary of the Ghaznavid ruler Mahmud of Ghazni (r. 998–1030) he wrote the epic Varqa wa Golshāh (ورقه و گلشاه) in 2,250 verses, which is a story of the love between a youth named Varqa and a maiden, Golshah. In the introduction, he eulogizes Mahmud of Ghazni. According to the poet himself, the story is based on the Arabic work ‘Orwa wa ‘Afra. The work survives in a unique manuscript dated to the mid-13th century and made in Konya (Seljuk Rum), which is now located in the Topkapi Museum (Topkapı Sarayı Müzesi, Hazine 841 H.841). Ayyuqi also wrote some qasidas. No reliable information about Ayyuqi has come down. His works are characterized by paired rhyme interspersed with ghazal.

== See also ==
- List of Persian poets and authors
- Persian literature

== General references ==
- Rypka, Jan (1968). History of Iranian Literature. Reidel Publishing Company. ISBN 90-277-0143-1. OCLC 460598.
- Ahmad, Ateş (1954). "Yak mathnavī-i gum-shuda az dawra-yi Ghaznaviyān, Varqa va Gulshāh-i ʿAyyūqī". Majalla-yi Dānishkada-yi adabiyāt-i Dānishgāh-i Tihrān. 1 (4): 1–13.
