= Maryam Jafari Azarmani =

Iranian poet (born 1977)

- مریم جعفری آذرمانی
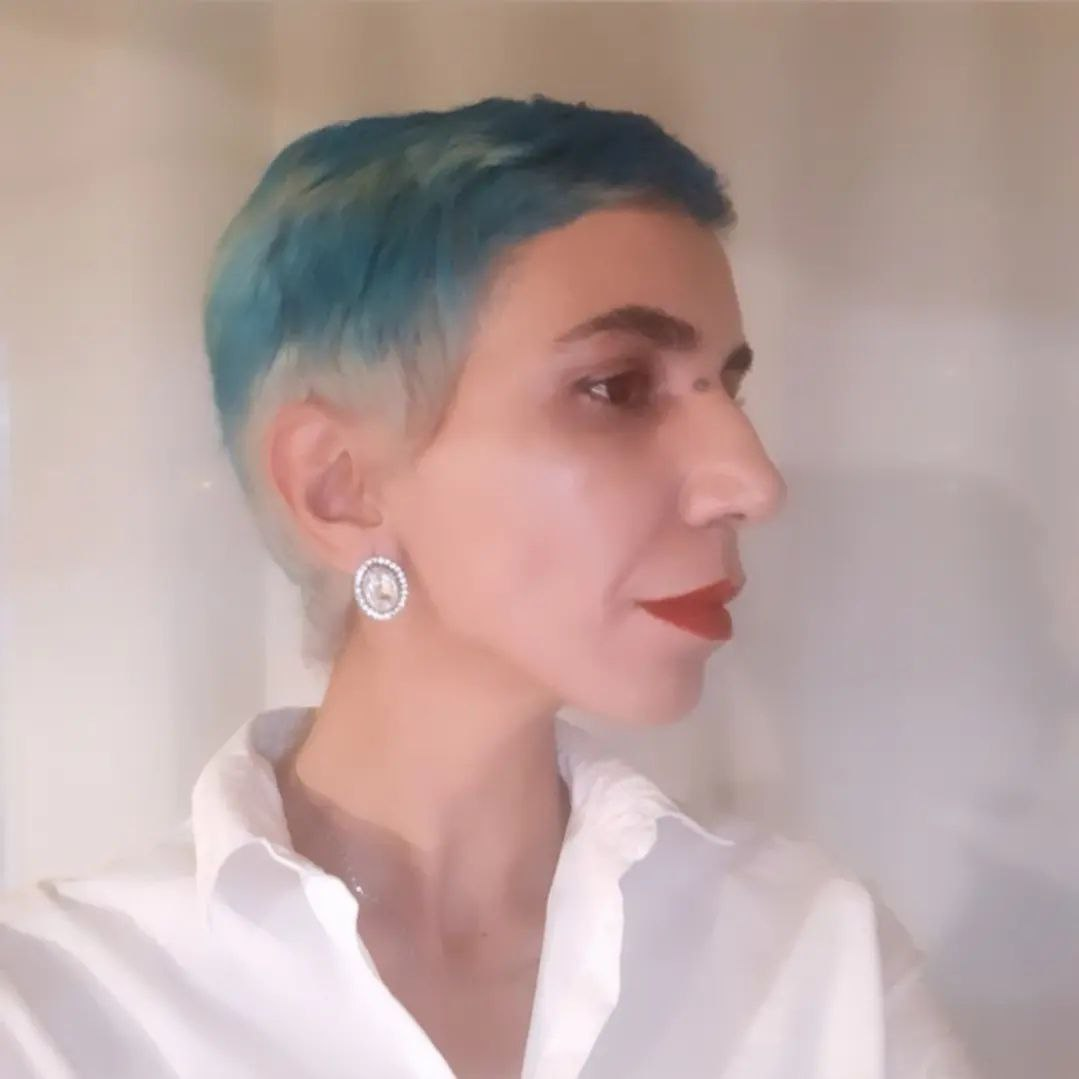
- Born: 25 November 1977 (age 48); Tehran, Imperial State of Iran
- Education: Alzahra University
- Occupations: Poet, literary critic, translator
- Spouse: Vahid Heroabadi

Maryam Jafari Azarmani (Persian: مریم جعفری آذرمانی, born 25 November 1977) is an Iranian poet, literary critic, and translator.

== Biography ==
Azarmani began writing poetry in 1996. She has published several books of poetry since 2007. She graduated from Alzahra University with a master's degree in Persian literature. The title of her thesis is "Analysis of the implications in one hundred poems of Hossein Monzavi based on Grice's theories". Azarmani has studied French translation (bachelor's degree) and translated French poetry.She holds a PhD in Persian Language and Literature. Her PhD dissertation focused on constitutional-era poetry based on theories of cognitive grammar and cognitive poetics.

== Books ==
Poetry books

- Symphony of the locked narrative (سمفونیِ روایتِ قفل شده)
- Piano (پیانو)
- Seven (هفت)
- The pick (زخمه)
- Qanun (قانون)
- 68 seconds remain to the performance of this opera (68 ثانیه به اجرای این اپرا مانده است)
- A Saw can be Heard (صدای ارّه می آید)
- Tribun (تریبون)
- Negotiation (مذاکرات)
- Circle (دایره)
- Beat (ضربان)
- Narrator
- Wailings
- Dissection
- Be free and love somebody
- Lovers women
- Desires

Research books

The Other Meaning (Analysis of the Implications in Poems of Hossein Monzavi Based on Paul Grice's Theories)

== See also ==
- List of Persian poets and authors
