= Fergani =

Fergani is a surname of North African, particularly Algerian, origin. People with that surname include:

- Ali Fergani (born 1952), Algerian footballer and manager
- Mohamed Tahar Fergani (1928–2016), Algerian singer, violinist and composer
- Salim Fergani (born 1953), Algerian oud player and singer

== See also ==
- Farghānī (disambiguation), a surname of Persian origin
