= Junayd Shirazi =

Mo'in al-Din Junayd ibn Mahmud ibn Muhammad Baghnovi Shirazi was a Sufi mystic and poet of Persia from the 14th century.

He has two works, namely, a divan, and Shadd al-Izar (written in 1389). The latter work contains the biographies of over three hundred famous persons buried in Shiraz, Iran.

== Sources ==
- Miransari, Ali (2019). "جنید شیرازی". The Great Islamic Encyclopaedia (in Persian).

== See also ==
- List of Persian poets and authors
- Persian literature
