= Sheyda Gerashi =

Iranian poet (1879–1920)

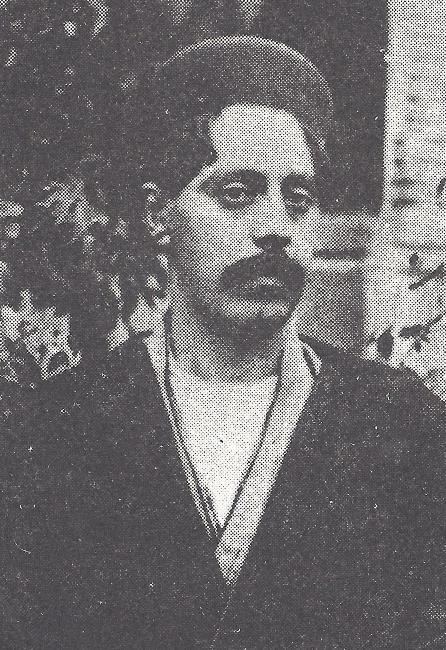
- Gerashi, cover of Diwan of Sheyda
- Born: Mohammadjafar Khan Gerashi; 3 December 1879; Gerash, Persia
- Died: 3 April 1920 (aged 40); Sahray-ye Bagh, Persia
- Resting place: Behind the Imam Husayn Shrine, Karbala, Iraq
- Other name: Moghtader-ol-Mamalek
- Writing career
- Pen name: Sheyda
- Notable work: Diwan of Poems

Mohammadjafar Khan Gerashi (Persian: محمدجعفر خان گراشی), son of Rostam Khan Gerashi and grandson of Fathali Khan Gerashi, known as Moghtader-ol-Mamalek (Persian: مقتدرالممالک) and better known as his pen-name Sheyda (Persian: شیدا), was a Persian Poet and Panegyrist. He was born in Gerash, Fars, Iran on 3 December 1879, and on 3 April 1920 in a local war in Sahray-ye Bagh, was killed. From him remains a Diwan contains the lyrics, quatrains, odes, dirges, etc., that published by Ahmad Eghtedari.

== See also ==
- List of Persian poets and authors
- Gerash
