= Takmelat al-akhbar =

16th-century Persian universal history

The Takmelat al-akhbar (Persian: تکملة الاخبار, romanized: The Historical Supplement) is a Persian universal history composed by the Safavid poet Abdi Beg Shirazi in 1570. It was dedicated to Princess Pari Khan Khanum, daughter of Tahmasp I. There has only been a publication of the final section, which deals with the Safavid era. It chronicles the rule of Ismail I and Tahmasp I up till 1570.

== Sources ==
- Aldous, Gregory (2021). "The Qazvin Period and the Idea of the Safavids". In Melville, Charles (ed.). Safavid Persia in the Age of Empires, the Idea of Iran Vol. 10. Bloomsbury Publishing. pp. 29–46. ISBN 978-0755633777.
- Quinn, Sholeh A. (2020). Persian Historiography Across Empires: The Ottomans, Safavids, and Mughals. Cambridge University Press. ISBN 978-1108842211.
- Trausch, Tilmann (2021). "Continuing a legacy in times of change". In Matthee, Rudi (ed.). The Safavid World. Routledge. pp. 182–200. ISBN 978-1138944060.
