= Ahmad Eghtedari =

Iranian educator, scholar, and lawyer

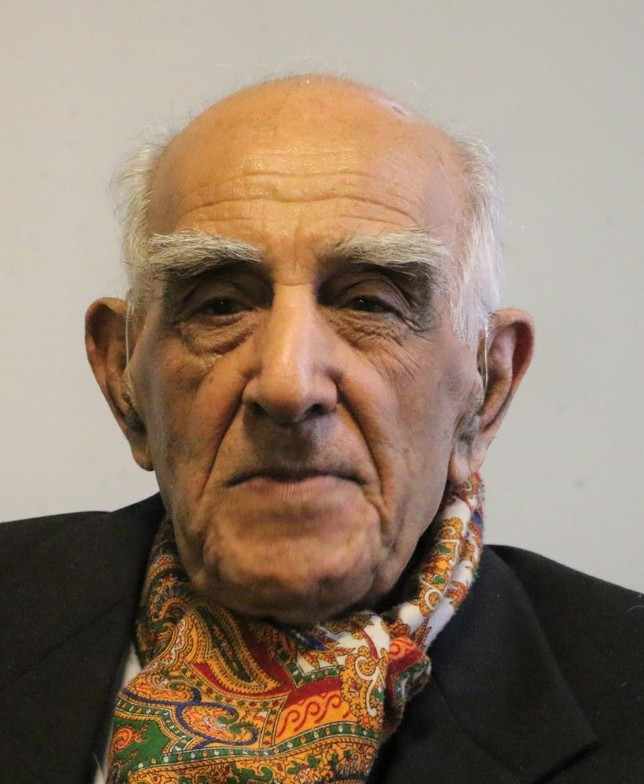
- Born: Ahmad Khan Eghtedari; 24 May 1925; Gerash, Fars province, Iran
- Died: 16 April 2019 (aged 93); Tehran, Iran
- Citizenship: Iranian
- Education: University of Tehran
- Occupations: Writer, historian, iranologist, scholar, geographer

Ahmad Eghtedari (Persian: احمد اقتداری; 24 May 1925, Gerash, Iran – 16 April 2019, Tehran) was an Iranian teacher, lawyer, writer, historian and geographer who was regarded as a prominent scholar in Persian Gulf studies. Historically, he was a descendant of Gerashi thanes (Khan in Persian). In his youth, he traveled on foot along the coasts of the Persian Gulf and Oman Sea and began mapping and documenting their topography.

Jalal Ale Ahmad, the famous writer, described the friendship between Ahmad Eghtedari, Iraj Afshar and Manuchehr Sotudeh as "three musketeers" and "gravestone-graphers", alluding to the fact that these three managed to introduce a lot of Iran's historical documents and ancient monuments.

The Pearl of The Persian Gulf is a book that documents his Iranian Studies researches, and the documentary film, To Iran, My Eternal, is made based on his life and works.

Ahmad Eghtedari died on 16 April 2019 in Tehran.

== Life and education ==
Ahmad Eghtedari was born Ahmad Khan Eqtedari Gerashi in 1925 in Gerash, a small city in the south of Fars, Iran. Both his parents, Mortaza Qoli Khan Eghtedari and Aniss Eghtedari, were Gerashi descendants of thanes (Khan in Persian) of Gerash.

He started his education in Lar and Shiraz. He returned to Lar to work as a teacher in elementary school, which he continued to do for 30 years. Meanwhile, in 1949, he was accepted in the Faculty of Law and Political Sciences of the University of Tehran and graduated as a lawyer in 1955. He worked as a lawyer for 40 years.

At the same time, he started his researches about the history of Larestan. Due to these prominent studies, he was invited to teach history to graduate students of the University of Tehran. Later, he received an honorary doctorate degree from the University of Tehran for his outstanding works and researches.

== Explorations in the Persian Gulf ==
His explorations along the coast of the Persian Gulf and the Oman Sea between 1966 and 1977 (from Bandar Deilam, Jask, Bandar Rig, Zahedan, Chabahar and Tis) resulted in the composition of such books as The Land of the Princes and also more than 4000 photos from historical sites. These documents are massively significant in the introduction of the history and culture of the southern regions of Iran and the coasts of the Persian Gulf.

Eghtedari filled his resume with vast studies in the works of the ancient times and also field studies. Due to these researches, he was invited to teach history to PhD students of history in the University of Tehran, from which he later received an honorary doctorate degree.

Mohammad Reza Shafiee Kadkani, the writer and researcher, praises Eghtedari's works in these words: "The Persian Gulf is the heart of Iran, and Dr. Ahmad Eghtedari, the heart of the Persian Gulf".

Mohammad Bagher Vosoughi, professor of history in the University of Tehran, also comments on Eghtedari: "In the recent 60 years, one cannot read about the Persian Gulf and ignore the works of Ahmad Eghtedari. Linguists, archeologists and historians make significant references to Eghtedari’s works".

== Bibliography ==
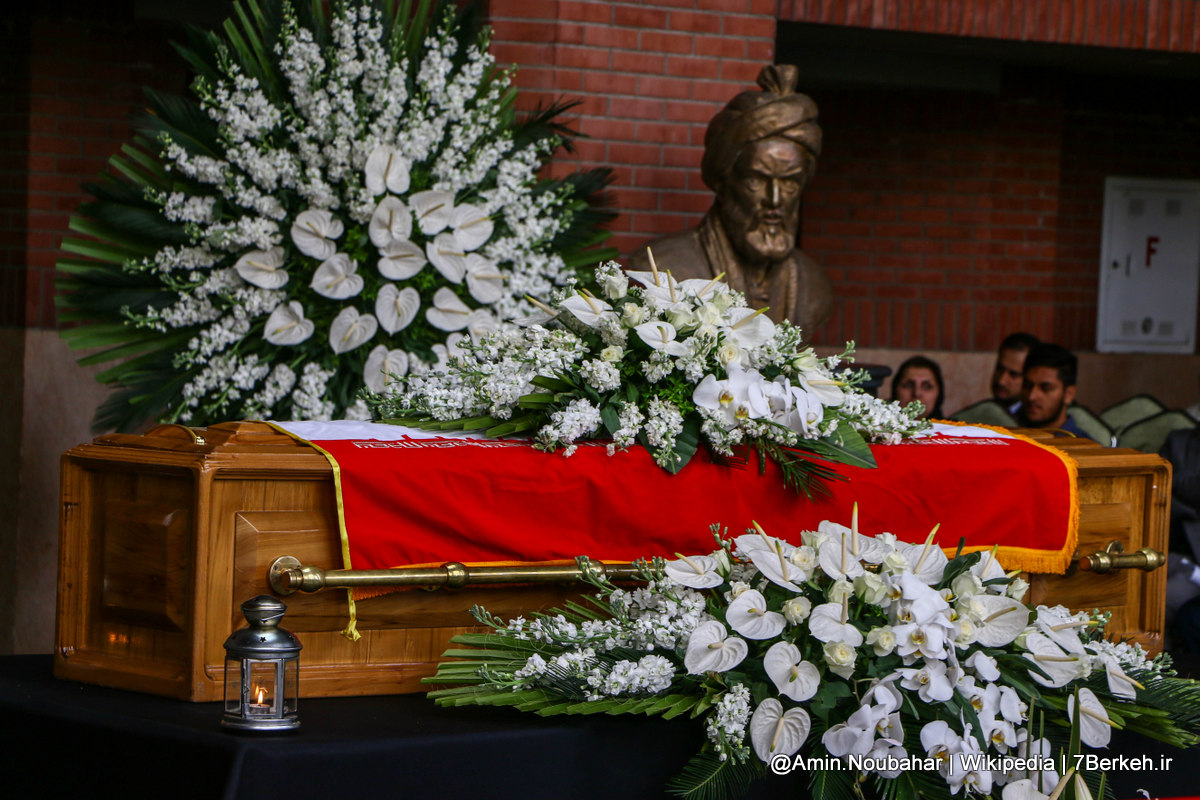
Funeral of Eghtedari in Tehran

Eghtedari's works are not limited to a single discipline. He has written books and articles in the fields of geography, folklore, linguistics, Iran's classic literature and bibliography. Eghtedari wrote 40 books and more than 100 scholarly papers. These works cover a wide range of topics, including the correction and publication of poetry collections written by previous poets, translations of the research works of non-Iranian scholars and writers, tales of Mathnavi, Manteq-o-Tair (Assembly of Birds) and One Thousand and One Nights, and also scientific researches in the fields of the language and the culture of different regions of Iran.

In 1993, at the age of 70, he published his autobiography, Lifetime's Caravan, featuring his cultural and political memories.

He also has 17 unpublished works.

Some of the books published by Ahmad Eghtedari are as follows:

1. The Persian Gulf, from Ancient Times until Today
2. Bandar Abbas and The Persian Gulf
3. Pearl Hunting in The Persian Gulf
4. The History of Muscat and Oman and Bahrain and Their Relations with Iran
5. The History of Shipping in Iran
6. Historical Sites of the Coasts and Islands of The Persian Gulf and Oman Sea
7. Ancient Larestan and Larestani Culture
8. Khuzestan and Kohgiluyeh and Mamasani

== Gallery ==
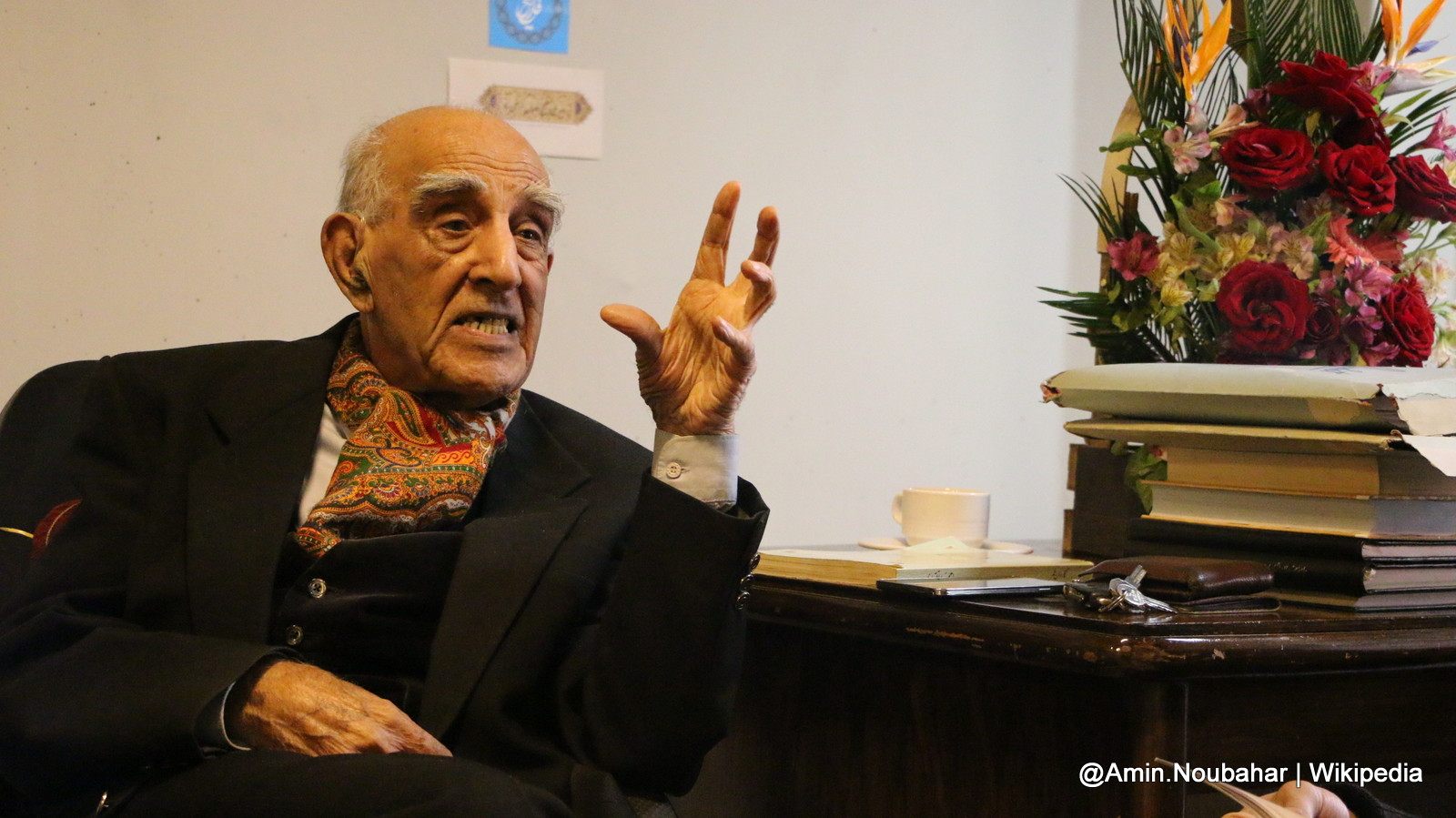

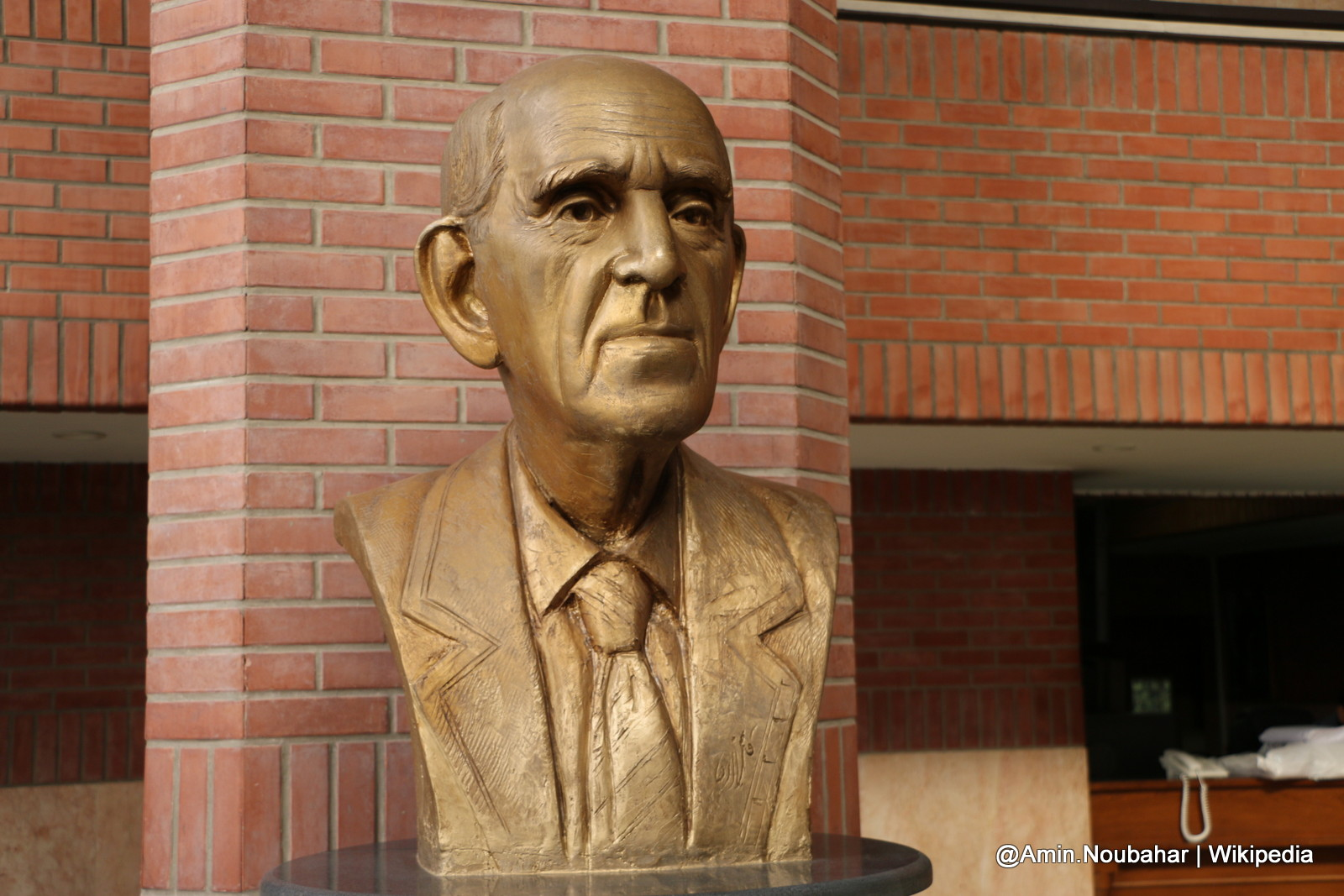

== See also ==
- Iraj Afshar
- Ehsan Yarshater
