= Mohammad-Reza Shafiei Kadkani =

Iranian poet, literary critic, editor and translator (born 1939)

Mohammad–Reza Shafiei Kadkani محمدرضا شفیعی کدکنی
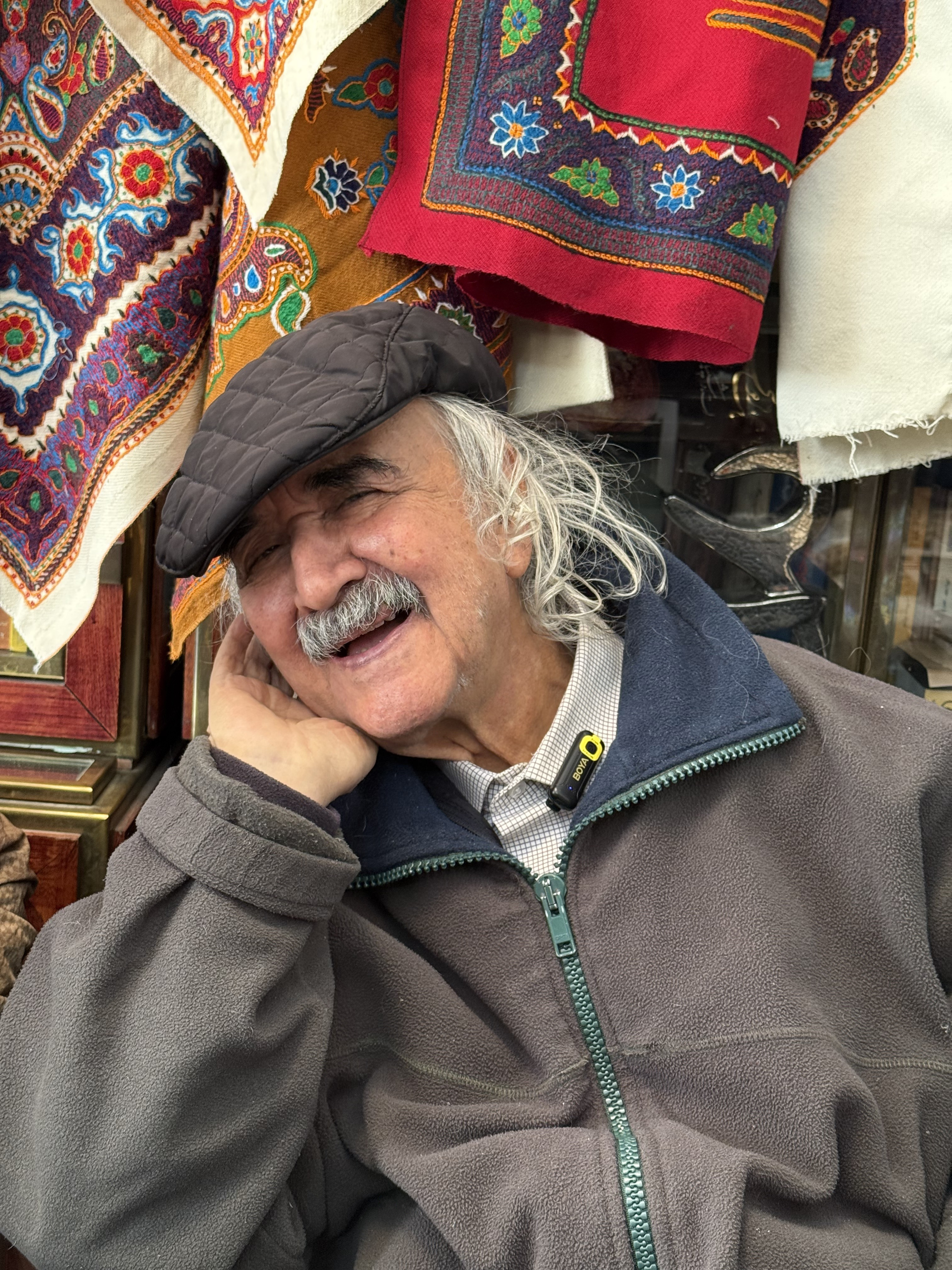
- Shafiei Kadkani in 2025
- Born: Mohammad-Reza Shafiei Kadkani محمدرضا شفیعی کدکنی; October 10, 1939 (age 86); Kadkan, Torbat-e Heydarieh, Iran
- Education: Faculty of Letters and Humanities of the University of Tehran
- Occupations: Poet, university professor, researcher and author
- Writing career
- Pen name: M. Sereshk

Mohammad-Reza Shafiei Kadkani (Persian: محمدرضا شفیعی کدکنی, also Romanized as "Mohammad–Reza Shafi'i Kadkani") (born 10 October 1939) is an Iranian writer, poet, literary critic, editor, and translator.

Kadkani was born in Nishapur, Razavi Khorasan.

He is currently professor of literature at University of Tehran. Shafiei-Kadkani is known for his works on literary criticism and modern Persian poetry.

== Education ==
Kadkani did not attend formal primary and secondary education. His parents sent him to classical religious schools at an age when others were going to formal government-sponsored primary and secondary schools. In interviews, he has credited his command of Persian and Arabic literature to his classical training.

He was spotted leafing through poetry books in a bookshop when a professor of literature noticed him—and impressed by Kadkani's vast command of Persian poetry—recommended that he formally pursue literature at the University of Mash-had.

Shafiei-Kadkani graduated from Tehran University with a doctorate degree in Persian literature.

He was a student of prominent figures such as Badiozzaman Forouzanfar, Mohammad Moin, and Parviz Natel-Khanlari.

== Books ==
Kadkani has written several books on the art of poetry, the first of which was completed in 1955, and published about 10 years later. Two of his most famous books are the following.

- Poetry and Music
- Poetry and Imagination

Kadkani has also researched, edited and compiled several classical books of Persian poetry, including all major works of Attar. Kadkani dedicates some of these Attar volumes to his father.

In 2018, Kadkani published a 3-volume treatise on the Persian poet Hafez. Two of these are based on his lectures at the University of Tehran. The third consists of a collection of his notes on Hafez' poetic lexicon. Kadkani credits his mother for having introduced him to Hafez and dedicates this 3-volume work to her.

== Poems ==
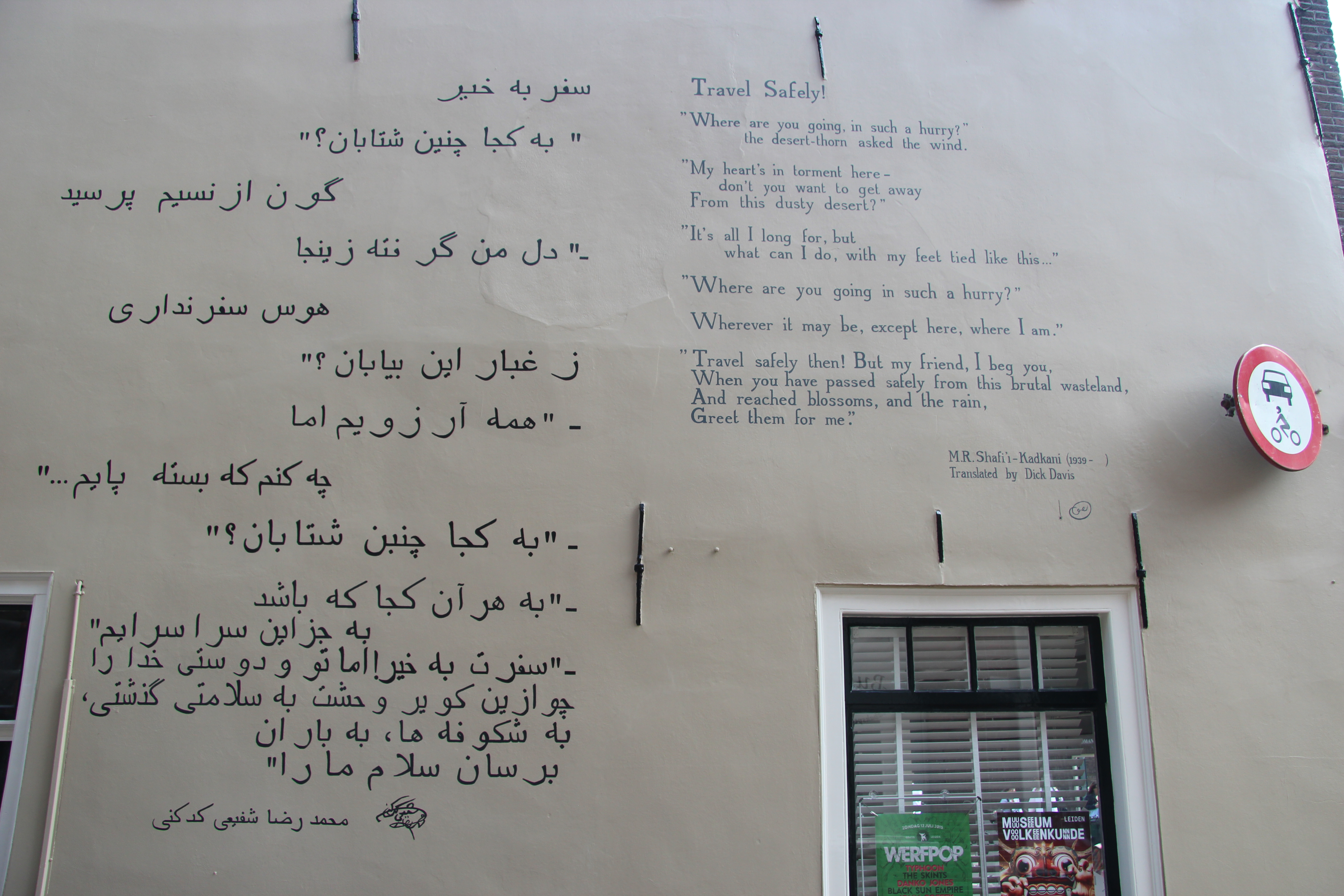
The poem Happy Journeys! (سفر بخیر) as a wallpoem in Leiden

He started publishing his poems in local publications at an early age while still living in the Khorasan province of Iran.

Originally, he used the pen-name of "Sereshk", which in Persian can mean "tear". This pen-name was also based on the Persian abbreviation of his full name. His most famous poem -- Happy Journeys!—has brought him international attention. It has decorated a wall in Leiden. It has also been inscribed on tombstones of many Persians, abroad and at home. (Use of poetry on tombstones is a long-standing tradition in the Persian-speaking world.)

He wrote "Requiem for a Tree", an allegorical poem on the death in 1966 of former prime minister Mohammad Mossadegh.

== See also ==
- Persian literature
- List of Persian poets and authors
