= Sahabi Astarabadi =

Persian poet (died 1601/02)

Sahabi Astarabadi (Persian: صحابی استرآبادی: died 1601/02) was a poet in 16th and 17th century Safavid Iran, who composed works in Persian. He dedicated a masnavi to Shah Abbas I (r. 1587–1629).

== Sources ==
- Rahman, Munibur (1997). "Saḥābī Astarābādī". In Bosworth, C. E.; van Donzel, E.; Heinrichs, W. P. & Lecomte, G. (eds.). The Encyclopaedia of Islam, Second Edition. Volume IX: San–Sze. Leiden: E. J. Brill. ISBN 978-90-04-10422-8.
