= Naziri Nishapuri =

Indo-Persian poet

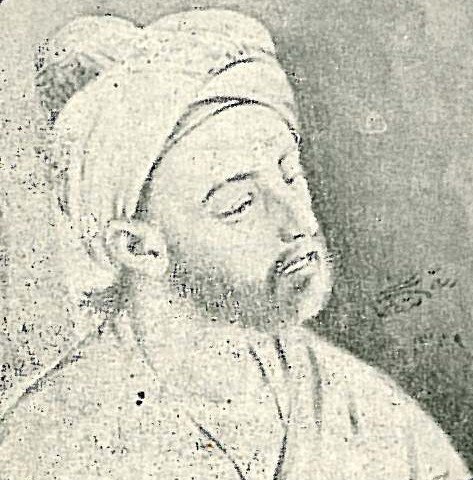
- Drawing of Naziri Nishapuri by Abbas Rassam Arjangi, dated 1960/61
- Born: c. 1560 Nishapur, Khorasan, Safavid Iran
- Died: 1612–1614 Ahmedabad, Gujarat, Mughal Empire
- Resting place: Ahmedabad
- Occupation: Poet
- Language: Persian

Naziri Nishapuri (Persian: ناظری نیشابوری; c. 1560 – between 1612–1614) was an Indo-Persian poet in the 16th and 17th century Mughal Empire.

== Biography ==
After his father's death, Naziri left his hometown Nishapur at a young age. Despite already being a skilled poet by then, he westward across Iran on trading ventures. In 1584, at Kashan, he met the literary biographer Taqi Kashi, and traded verses with the city's renowned poets, including Reza'i, Shoja, and Hatem. Naziri moved to India shortly after the event, where he became the first poet from Iran to enter the service of Abdul Rahim Khan-i-Khanan, a renowned statesman and patron of literature in the Mughal Empire. Over roughly ten years at the court, he produced numerous panegyrics celebrating Abdul Rahim Khan-i-Khanan and benefited greatly from his support, becoming a well-known poet. Naziri did not become part of the main group of writers of the Mughal emperor Akbar (r. 1556–1605), but he was introduced to the royal Mughal family through Abdul Rahim Khan-i-Khanan.

In 1593/94, Naziri made a pilgrimage to Mecca, but encountered an attack by Bedouin robbers during his journey. In response, he sought help from Mohammad-Aziz Azam Khan, Akbar's foster brother, who was also present in the area at the time. Naziri had previously praised Azam Khan's capture of the fortress at Juna in a poem. After returning to India, Naziri moved to Gujarat and gradually separated himself from Abdul Rahim Khan-i-Khanan's court, although still maintaining some connection. When Abdul Rahim Khan-i-Khanan mentioned him briefly in an added note to a letter of gratitude to another poet, Anisi Shamlu, Naziri felt insulted. Naziri criticized Abdul Rahim Khan-i-Khanan's lack of regard for those who served under him for a long time in a qasida (panegyric ode).

Naziri died between 1612–1614 in Ahmedabad, where he was buried in a mosque close to his home. According to the modern historian Sunil Sharma, Naziri "ranks among the premier Persian poets of the Safavid and Mughal periods." Another modern historian, Munibur Rahman, says that Naziri "holds a place of distinction among the leading poets of the Mughal period."

== Sources ==
- Losensky, Paul (2004). "Naẓiri Nišāpuri". In Yarshater, Ehsan (ed.). Encyclopædia Iranica (Online ed.). Brill.
- Rahman, Munibur (1995). "Naẓīrī". In Bosworth, C. E.; van Donzel, E.; Heinrichs, W. P. & Lecomte, G. (eds.). The Encyclopaedia of Islam, Second Edition. Volume VIII: Ned–Sam. Leiden: E. J. Brill. ISBN 978-90-04-09834-3.
- Sharma, Sunil (2017). Mughal Arcadia - Persian Literature in an Indian Court. Harvard University Press. ISBN 9780674975859.
