= Mirza Mohsen Ta'sir Tabrizi =

Iranian poet and administator (1650–1719)

- Born: 1650; Isfahan, Safavid Iran
- Died: 1719 (aged 68–69); Isfahan, Safavid Iran

Mirza Mohsen Ta'sir Tabrizi (Persian: میرزا محسن تأثیر تبریزی; 1650–1719) was a poet and administrator in Safavid Iran. During his time in his hometown of Isfahan, two of his tutors were Mohammad Taher Vahid Qazvini and Agha Hossein Khansari. For a period, Ta'sir was reportedly the head of the financial and administrative affairs of Persian Iraq and Yazd. He resigned in 1708 due to defamation by his opponents. He returned to Isfahan, where he died.

== Sources ==
- Miransari, Ali (2019). "تأثیر-تبریزی". The Great Islamic Encyclopaedia (in Persian).
