= Abu Tahir Khosrovani =

10th-century Persian poet

Abu Tahir Khosrovani (Persian: ابو طاهر خسروانی) was a 10th-century Persian who lived in the Samanid Empire. He was a native of Khorasan, and lived during the lifetime of the famous Persian poet Rudaki. Much of Khosrovani's poetry, however, has disappeared and only a few are in existence, which are quoted by several Persian poets such as Asadi Tusi. Khosrovani later died in 953.

== Sources ==
- Dabīrsīāqī, M. (1983). "ABŪ TAHER ḴOSRAVĀNĪ". Encyclopaedia Iranica, Vol. I, Fasc. 4. pp. 387–388.
