= Antonia Noori Farzan =

American journalist

- Employer: The Providence Journal
- Awards: George Polk Award
- Website: http://www.antonianoorifarzan.com/

Antonia Noori Farzan is an American journalist. She was educated in Hamilton College and Columbia University. Farzan was a journalist for Business Insider, The Independent and the Phoenix New Times, and Washington Post. She writes for The Providence Journal. In 2017 Farzan won the George Polk Award with Joseph Flaherty for her article in the Phoenix New Times which revealed "that Motel 6 motels in Phoenix, Arizona, provided nightly guest rosters to ICE".
