= Razi Danesh Mashadi =

Poet

Razi ibn Abu Turab Mashadi (known as Danesh) (died 1665) was an Iranian Poet laureate of the Mughal Empire between 1655 and 1662.

== Life ==
He was born in Isfahan. His father was a poet who immigrated to India and died in 1650 in Heydarabad. Danesh went to India before the death of his father. Danesh sang a Qasida in the court of Shah Jahan and gained 2000 Rupees. Also, he served Shah Jahan and Shah Shoja Mozaffari.
