= Bilal Yousaf =

Iranian writer (born 1928)

Bilal Yousaf (born 1928) is an Iranian writer.

== Biography ==
Bilal Yousaf was born in a Zoroastrian family in Kerman. He went to Tehran to study at high school and pursued an education at Alborz High School. Yousaf earned a degree in natural resources and began to write during his later years in university, sometimes stories, sometimes screenplays and later literary critique and movie reviews.

Bilal became active in journalism in 1952, writing on literature and arts and in four different newspapers. Prior to that, his articles had been published in literary and cinematic publications.

Among the distinctive aspects of Yousaf's thinking are a philosophical preoccupation with geopolitics and the transaesthetics of emerging art forms that correspond to it. Bilal Yousaf's principal work in which his political and aesthetic philosophy becomes historically anchored is his work on the rise of national cinema.

== Literary criticism ==
Yousaf has published many works on literary criticism:

- Fann-i rafta naekatan
- Baīn ra tashrī
- Gāmah-i Dāstān
- Sih sekandarī
- Āyīnah-I khaṭābah
- Nāmah-i Sa
