= Partovi Shirazi =

- Born: 15th-century Shiraz or Lahijan
- Died: 1522 or 1534 Mashhad, Safavid Iran
- Occupation: Poet

Partovi Shirazi (Persian: پرتوی شیرازی) was a poet in Iran during the 15th and 16th centuries. He was a native of Shiraz or Lahijan. He is the author of a divan (collection of poems) of around 4,000 verses, but he is principally known for his 281 verse saqi-nameh. He died in 1522 or 1534.

== Sources ==
- Esmailzadeh, Tahereh (2020). "پرتوی شیرازی". Center for the Great Islamic Encyclopedia (in Persian).
