= Ibn Nasuh Shirazi =

- Born: Shiraz
- Died: 1391

Ibn Nasuh Shirazi (died 1391) was a Persian-speaking poet who worked under the Ilkhanate and Jalayirid dynasties.

He was a native of Shiraz, leading him to be called "Ibn Nasuh-i Farsi" or "Shirazi". His name is uncertain, later accounts call him "Fazlollah," "Kamal al-Din," or "Mahmud". His father was a distinguished figure in Shiraz. From his early youth, Ibn Nasuh was raised in the company of Islamic scholars and spiritual leaders. He began his career during the reign of the Ilkhanate Abu Sa'id Bahadur Khan (r. 1316–1335). After the collapse of the Ilkhanate, Ibn Nasuh started working under the newly established Jalayirid dynasty of Hasan Buzurg. Ibn Nasuh became a prominent figure there, serving the Jalayirids almost until the end of his life.

Ibn Nasuh was a Shia Muslim. His poetry contains various references to his faith, including a tarji-band that commends Ali and asserts his right to leadership. Such beliefs were common under the Jalayirids.

== Sources ==
- Abdali, Mohammad (2020). "ابن نصوح". The Great Islamic Encyclopaedia (in Persian).
