= Mirza Manohar Tausani =

16th century Mughal Persian poet

Mirza Rai Manohar Das "Tausani" (Persian: میرزا رای منوهرداس توسنی) was a Persian poet active during the reign of the Mughal emperor Akbar. He is regarded as the first notable Hindu poet in Persian literary tradition of India. A native of Jaipur, he was associated with the Kachhwaha dynasty and contributed to the development of Persian poetry in the early Mughal period. Akbar was so impressed with him that he personally taught him Persian, as emphatically noted by Jahangir in his Tuzuk.

== Life ==
The characteristic of shadow is that none should trample over the light even the exalted sun.

Pious man; thou art worshipper of the sacred Kaba while we are worshippers of the Friend according to your own belief you are called Muslim whereas I am still a Brahman.

— Jahangir, Tuzuk, as quoted in his record of Manohar Das 'Tausani's Persian couplets.

Tausani was the son of Rai Lonkaran Shaikhawat, a Rajput Raja of Sambhar. Akbar took a special interest in his upbringing, and as a child, Manohar lived in the imperial palace at Fatehpur Sikri, where the emperor affectionately called him Muhammad Manohar. Manohar Pura named by Akbar after his name. Jahangir also showed him great care, making playful remarks about Tausani's poetic talents in his Tuzuk. Poetry, being a central and admired element of Mughal culture, was deeply absorbed by Tausani in his character. Contemporary writers, including Abul Fazl and Badayuni, noted that he was the first Hindu poet to write in Persian, with verses demonstrating artistic grace and maturity. Later writers confirmed this assessment. Sufism appears to have been a favored theme in his work. According to tazkirah writers, Tausani was the first Hindu poet to compile a Diwan, which remained available until the time of Mirzā Sā'ib, who recorded selected verses from the Diwan-i-Tausani in his Bayāz.
