= Shapour Bonyad =

Iranian poet

Shahpour Bonyad (1947, Shiraz – 2000, Shiraz; Persian: شاپور بنیاد) was an Iranian poet.

== Biography ==
He studied cinematography in France. A few months after the 1979 Iranian Revolution, Bonyad returned to Iran but because of his political beliefs could not continue his activities in his homeland. He taught French literature at the University of Shiraz for a while but was sacked by the fundamentalist government.

Up to now five poem collections by him have been published in Shiraz; he was also at editorial board of literary project "Halgheye Niloufari".

He died of a heart attack in Shiraz.
