= Abdi Beg Shirazi =

16th-century Iranian writer

- Born: 1513; Tabriz, Safavid Iran
- Died: 1580 (aged 66–67); Ardabil, Safavid Iran
- Occupations: Court poet, historian, and administrator
- Writing career
- Language: Persian
- Notable work: Takmelat al-akhbar

Abdi Beg Shirazi (Persian: عبدی بیگ شیرازی: 1513 – 1580), full name Khvāja Zayn al-ʿĀbedīn ʿAlī ibn ʿAbd al-Moʾmen, also known by the pen name Novīdī, was a 16th-century Persian poet associated with the Safavid court; He was a court poet, historian, and administrator in 16th-century Safavid Iran, who composed the Persian universal history Takmelat al-akhbar.

== Biography ==
Abdi Beg Shirazi was born in 1513 (921 AH) and died in 1580 (988 AH). Although often referred to as originating from Shiraz, some sources suggest he was born and raised in Tabriz, his mother’s hometown, where his father had settled. Biographical details about his personal life are limited. Records indicate that he died in Ardabil in 1580.

Abdi served as a secretary and accountant (mostawfī) in the royal chancery of Shah Ṭahmāsp I. In his early literary career, he composed mostly ghazals and rubāʿīyāt. However, under royal guidance and with encouragement from the poet Qāsemī Gonābādī, he shifted his focus to mathnavī (rhyming couplets), which became the dominant form in his oeuvre.

== Literary works ==
His most significant contributions include three Khamsas, each consisting of five independent narrative poems modeled after the structure of Neẓami Ganjavi’s works. Among these, Ṣahifat al-eklas—a descriptive account of the palaces, gardens, and artists of Qazvīn during its time as the Safavid capital—stands out, though it remains unpublished.

The only known published work is his Maǰnūn o Layla, edited by A. Hashumogly Rahimov and published in Moscow in 1966. Most of his other mathnavīs are believed to be lost. A possible exception is the Ṭarabnāma, which may survive under alternative titles such as Qeṣaṣ al-anbīāʾ or Ketāb-e naẓm-e sīar va ḡazavāt-e Sayyed al-Bašar, sometimes incorrectly attributed to Bīrūnī. This manuscript is housed in the Oriental Institute of the Uzbek SSR.

Additionally, ʿAbdī authored a historical work titled Takmelat al-aḵbār, dedicated to Shah Ṭahmāsp’s daughter Parīkhān Khānom. This chronicle is a valuable source for the political and cultural history of 16th-century Iran. A portion of it, dealing with the reign of Shah Esmāʿīl I, has been published in a facsimile edition with a Russian translation.

His Dīvān (collected poetry) was published in Lucknow in 1851 (1267 AH).

== Legacy ==
ʿAbdī Shīrāzī remains a lesser-known but notable figure among Persian poets of the Safavid era, particularly for his attempts to emulate classical models and for his literary documentation of his time.

== Sources ==
- Aldous, Gregory (2021). "The Qazvin Period and the Idea of the Safavids". In Melville, Charles (ed.). Safavid Persia in the Age of Empires, the Idea of Iran Vol. 10. Bloomsbury Publishing. pp. 29–46. ISBN 978-0755633777.
- Fragner, B. G.; Dabirsiaqi, M. (2020). "ʿAbdī Sīrāzī". Encyclopaedia Iranica Online. Brill. doi:10.1163/2330-4804_EIRO_COM_4443.
- Losensky, Paul E. (2008). "ʿAbdī Shīrāzī". In Fleet, Kate; Krämer, Gudrun; Matringe, Denis; Nawas, John; Rowson, Everett (eds.). Encyclopaedia of Islam (3rd ed.). Brill Online. ISSN 1873-9830.
- Quinn, Sholeh A. (2020). Persian Historiography Across Empires: The Ottomans, Safavids, and Mughals. Cambridge University Press. ISBN 978-1108842211.
- Trausch, Tilmann (2021). "Continuing a legacy in times of change". In Matthee, Rudi (ed.). The Safavid World. Routledge. pp. 182–200. ISBN 978-1138944060.
