= Mohammad Qoli Salim Tehrani =

Persian poet

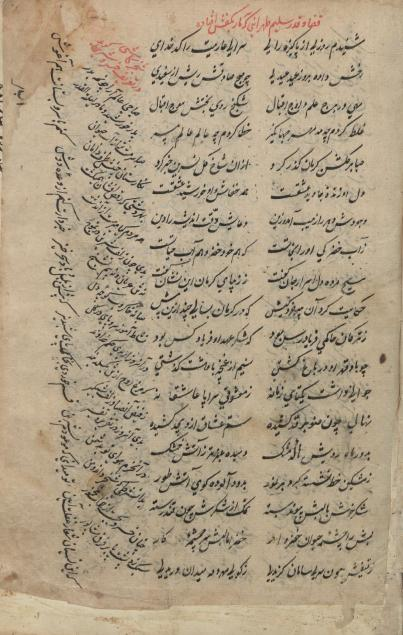
- al-qada' wa'l-qadar (Handwriting Mathnawi of Predestination) by Mohammad Qoli Salim Tehrani, Malik National Museum of Iran
- Born: Mohammad Reza Tarshati Tehrani; Tehran, Safavid Iran
- Died: 1647; Kashmir, Mughal Empire
- Children: 1 son
- Writing career
- Years active: 1630-1647

Mohammad Reza Tarshati Tehrani (Persian: محمدرضا طرشتی تهرانی) (died 1647), nicknamed Salim (سلیم) was an Iranian poet and one of the Persian-speaking poets of the Mughal Empire.
