= Aghdasi Mashhadi =

Aghdasi Mashhadi (Persian: اقدسی مشهدی; 1568–1594) was a poet in Safavid Iran, who wrote in Persian.

== Sources ==
- Literature Section (2019). "اقدسی مشهدی". The Great Islamic Encyclopaedia (in Persian).
