= Farzaneh Aghaeipour =

Iranian playwright, author, and activist

Farzaneh Aghaeipour (Persian: فرزانه آقايي پور) is an Iranian playwright, author, and activist. She was a board member at the politically active Writers' Association of Iran, which fights censorship and advocates freedom of expression.

Her major works include historical plays and novels on recent Iranian political history. In a 2006 tour of North America, Aghaeipour spoke at the Ontario Institute for Studies in Education (a teacher's college which is part of the University of Toronto), on September 9, 2006 and later that month at Université du Québec à Montréal.

== Publications ==
- Sattār-i Qarahʹdāghī : namāyishnāmah, 1991 (in Persian)
- Pārk-i Atābak : namāyishnāmah, 1991 (in Persian)
- Hunar va davarī, 1999 (in Persian)
- Riz̤a Khān dar yak namāyish-i ʻajīb, 1999 (in Persian)
- Aghaeipour, Farzaneh (2015). Nastaran (Persian ed.). H&S Media. p. 168. ISBN 978-1-780-83467-2.
