= Farzaneh (Tajik poet) =

Tajik poet

Inoyat Hojieva Farzaneh
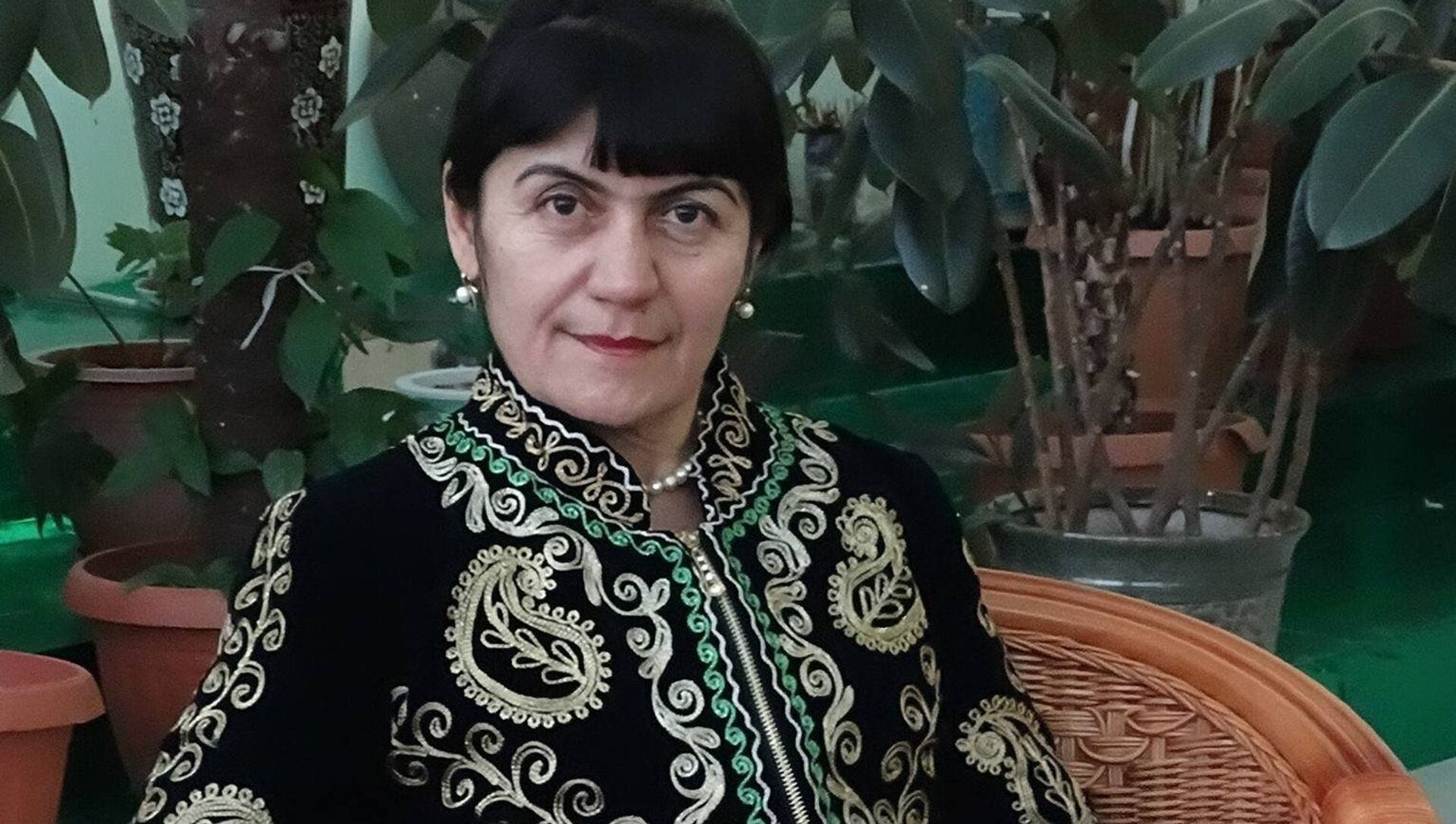
- Born: 3 November 1964 (age 61); Khujand, Tajikistan
- Occupation: Poet

Inoyat Hojieva (Tajik: Иноят Ҳоҷиева), mostly known as Farzona (Tajik: Фарзона) is a Tajik poet and writer. She won a lifetime achievement award.

== Life ==
She was influenced by Forough Farrokhzad and other Persian poets, such as Firdowsi and Rumi.

Farzona's works are well known throughout Persian-speaking countries. She is known as Forough of Tajikistan. Her frequently playful and witty poetry draws on rich traditions of Persian literature in a rather humorous way. In late 1980, she wrote a poem called "To the Nation that Gave Birth to Ahmad Zohir".

== Works ==
- Farzaneh Khojandi poems, Enitharmon Press and the Poetry Translation Centre, (Sept 2008), translators: Jo Shapcott, Narguess Farzad, ISBN 978-1-904634-74-4

== See also ==
- Modern Tajik literature
