= Saif Farghani =

Persian poet

Saif Farghani (Persian: سیف فرغانی, romanized: Sayf Farġānī, in full: مولانا سَیفُ‌الدّین ابوالمَحامِد محمّد فَرغانی, Mawlānā Sayf ad-dīn Abū al-Maḥāmid Muḥammad Farġānī) was a 13th-14th century Persian poet. He was born in Fergana, a city in Transoxiana (in modern-day Uzbekistan) and died in 1348 (749 Hijri) in Aksaray (modern-day Turkey).

He uses the Khorasani style in his poetry. His poems are in simple Persian and use less mixed Arabic vocabulary. He considers Saadi Shirazi a master of Persian poetry and follows in his footsteps, according to his own poetry.
