= Abu'l-Abbas Marwazi =

Persian poet (c. 7th-8th century CE)

Abu'l-Abbas Marwazi (Persian: ابوالعباس مروزی) was an early Persian poet. Muhammad Aufi considers him the first Persian poet. His works are lost. He lived in 8th century in Marv and along Persian, he was also fluent in Arabic. Aufi quoted four couplets of him in his book, but modern scholars cast doubt on whether these couplets are from Marwazi or not, since their language doesn't resemble other early Persian poems. Albert Kazimirski de Biberstein believed that these couplets are from 7th or 8th AH because of the presence of many Arabic loanwords in them.
