= Bukhari (surname) =

Family name or surname

Bukhari (Persian: بُخاری), also spelled as Bokhari, Bukhary or Bukhori, is a common surname in South Asia and in the Muslim world, meaning "from Bukhara" (a Persian speaking-majority city in today's Uzbekistan).

Its Arabic version is al-Bukhari (Arabic: البخاري)

== Males ==
- Makhdoom Jalaluddin Surkh-Posh Bukhari (Naqvi/Naqawi Al Bukhari) (1199–1291), 13th-century Naqvi Sufi saint and missionary settled in Uch, Bahawalpur, Pakistan. (Founding father of Naqvi Al Bukhari, not to be confused with Naqvi Al Bhakkari founded by his paternal 3rd cousin).
- Makhdoom Jahaniyan Jahangasht, 13th-century scholar, successor and paternal grandson of Jalaluddin Surkh-Posh Bukhari (Naqvi/Naqawi Al Bukhari)
- al-Bukhari (810–870), editor of Sahih al-Bukhari, the book of Hadith
- Abū Naṣr Aḥmad ibn Muḥammad al-Bukhārī (eleventh century), author of Tāj al-qiṣaṣ
- Abu Ishaq al-Saffar al-Bukhari (1067–1139), Hanafi-Maturidi scholar
- Shah Jewna or Hazrat Pir Shah Jewna Al-Naqvi Al-Bukhari, famous saint of Kannauj and a paternal descendant of Jalaluddin Surkh-Posh Bukhari through Sadruddin Rajan Qatal Naqvi Al Bukhari.
- Jamal ad-Din Muḥammad ibn Ṭāhir ibn Muḥammad al-Zaydī al-Bukhārī (13th-century), Persian-speaking Muslim astronomer
- 'Ala' al-Din al-Bukhari (1377–1438), Hanafi-Maturidi scholar
- Pir Haji Ali Shah Bukhari, 14th century Sufi saint
- Kirom Bukhoroi, 18th century Tajik poet
- Syed Ata Ullah Shah Bukhari (1892–1961), Muslim scholar and orator
- Patras Bokhari (1898–1958), Pakistani humorist and diplomat
- Zulfiqar Ali Bukhari (1904–1975), Urdu broadcaster and first director-general of Radio Pakistan
- Lal Bokhari (1909–1959), Indian field hockey player
- Abdul Halim Bukhari (1945–2022), Bangladeshi Islamic scholar
- Naeem Bokhari (born 1948), Pakistani lawyer and television personality
- Nayyar Hussain Bukhari (born 1952), Pakistani politician
- Shahid Hussain Bokhari (born 1952), Pakistani computer scientist
- Syed Faisal Bukhari (born 1963), Pakistani film and television director, producer, and cinematographer
- Syed Iftikhar Bokhari (1935–2021), Pakistani politician and cricketer
- Mudassar Bukhari (born 1983), Pakistani-born Dutch cricketer
- Admiral Fasih Bokhari, Chief of Naval Staff of the Pakistani Navy
- Asghar Bukhari, founding member of the Muslim Public Affairs Committee UK
- Ahmed Bukhari, Imam of Delhi's Jama Masjid
- Daoud Bokhary (born c. 1919), Hong Kong businessman
- Kemal Bokhary (born 1947), Hong Kong judge
- Izzeldin Bukhari, Palestinian chef

== Females ==
- Mahek Bukhari, British-Pakistani social media influencer
- Meher Bukhari, Pakistani journalist
- Samra Bukhari, Pakistani novelist
- Safiya Bukhari, American political activist

== See also ==
- Boukhari, people named Boukhari
