= Maleho Samarkandi =

17th-century poet and literary biographer from Samarkand

- ملیحای سمرقندی
- Born: Muhammad Badi ibn Muhammad Sharif c. 1641–1650; Samarkand, Khanate of Bukhara
- Died: After 1692
- Occupations: Poet; Biographer; Literary critic; Islamic scholar
- Writing career
- Language: Tajik
- Genres: Ghazal; Tazkira; Biographical literature; Literary criticism
- Notable work: Muzakkir al-Ashab
- Movement: Tajik literature

Muhammad Badi Maleho Samarkandi (Persian: محمد بدیع ملیحای سمرقندی; Tajik: Муҳаммадбадеъ Малеҳои Самарқандӣ; born c. 1641–1650; died after 1692) was a seventeenth-century Tajik-language poet, biographer, literary critic and scholar from Samarkand, in Transoxiana. He is best known for Muzakkir al-Ashab, a biographical anthology documenting the lives and works of poets from Central Asia and Iran. His writings are among the principal contemporary sources for the literary and intellectual history of seventeenth-century Transoxiana.

Maleho was born into an educated family in Samarkand and travelled through Iran during the late seventeenth century, meeting poets and scholars whose biographies he subsequently recorded. His travels connected the literary circles of Bukhara and Samarkand with those of Safavid Iran, particularly Isfahan, where he became acquainted with the poet and literary biographer Mirza Tahir Nasrabadi.

His principal work, Muzakkir al-Ashab, was completed in the early 1690s. It preserves biographical information, poetic excerpts and observations about the social circumstances of writers from Transoxiana and Iran, including Sayido Nasafi and Fitrat Zarduz Samarqandi. Its significance extends beyond literary biography: historians have used the anthology to reconstruct aspects of religious scholarship, patronage, urban occupations and cultural exchange in seventeenth-century Central Asia.

== Life ==
=== Family and early education ===
Maleho was born in Samarkand, then part of the Khanate of Bukhara, during the rule of the Ashtarkhanid dynasty. His birth is conventionally dated to 1641, although other scholarly accounts give approximately 1650. His precise birth date and year of death are unknown.

His personal name was Muhammad Badi ibn Muhammad Sharif Samarqandi, while Maleho was his literary pen name. His father, Muhammad Sharif, was an educated religious scholar who held the position of mufti in Samarkand. The family's connection with the city's scholarly and religious institutions provided Maleho with opportunities for an extensive education.

In the autobiographical material preserved in Muzakkir al-Ashab, Maleho described his family's longstanding association with Samarkand. His father supervised much of his early education, which included Islamic jurisprudence, logic, Islamic theology, philosophy, astronomy and Arabic grammar. He also became familiar with the literary conventions of Persian poetry, which were cultivated in the scholarly circles of Transoxiana.

Maleho developed an interest in poetry from an early age. His familiarity with the religious sciences and Persian literary culture later influenced both his poetic compositions and the critical observations contained in his biographical anthology.

=== Travels to Iran ===
During the late 1670s, Maleho travelled from Transoxiana to Safavid Iran. His journey was associated with a diplomatic mission from the court of the Bukharan ruler, and he used the opportunity to meet poets, scholars and other literary figures.

The chronology of his travels varies slightly between historical studies. James White places his journey to Isfahan with a Bukharan embassy around 1677–1678, while UNESCO records his acquaintance with Mirza Tahir Nasrabadi in 1679.

Maleho's travels brought him into contact with literary communities in several Iranian cities, including Mashhad, Nishapur, Kashan and Isfahan. He sought out poets, attended literary gatherings and collected information about their lives and writings.

These encounters formed an important part of the material later incorporated into Muzakkir al-Ashab. Maleho frequently described the circumstances in which he met individual writers, making his anthology a source of firsthand observations rather than merely a compilation of earlier literary notices.

=== Literary relations with Isfahan ===
Maleho's acquaintance with Mirza Tahir Nasrabadi was particularly important for the exchange of literary information between Transoxiana and Iran.

Nasrabadi was a prominent Persian poet and compiler of Tazkira-yi Nasrabadi, a biographical anthology of contemporary writers. He and Maleho exchanged information concerning poets from their respective regions, and some of the material transmitted through their meetings subsequently appeared in their literary collections.

Nasrabadi's anthology incorporated information about poets of Transoxiana obtained from Maleho. UNESCO identifies material relating to approximately 55 Transoxanian poets that was derived from these exchanges.

Their relationship has attracted scholarly attention because it illustrates the continuity of Persian-language literary culture across the political boundary separating the Safavid state from the Sunni-ruled Khanate of Bukhara.

Olimjon Khojamurodov's 2023 study of the literary and cultural relations between Transoxiana and Iran emphasizes Maleho's role in maintaining these connections. The study treats his travels and exchanges with Iranian writers as evidence of a shared Persian-Tajik literary environment that extended across different states and religious communities.

=== Later life ===
According to UNESCO's History of Civilizations of Central Asia, Maleho returned to Bukhara in 1690 before travelling to Samarkand, where he completed his anthology.

He continued his scholarly and literary activities after returning to Transoxiana. Tajik historical accounts also associate him with religious teaching and judicial work in Samarkand.

The exact date of his death has not been established. His anthology and its supplementary materials indicate that he was active until at least 1692–1693. Some modern reference works give his lifespan as approximately 1650–1700, but the latter date is an estimate rather than a documented year of death.

== Literary career ==
=== Tajik literary tradition ===
Maleho belonged to the Persian-language literary world of seventeenth-century Transoxiana, which forms an important part of the historical development of Tajik literature. The cities of Samarkand, Bukhara and Balkh maintained established traditions of Persian poetry and scholarship during the Ashtarkhanid period.

The literary culture of these cities extended beyond royal courts. Scholars, merchants, craftsmen, religious teachers and government officials participated in poetic gatherings, exchanged compositions and maintained literary relationships with writers in other regions.

Maleho was both a participant in this literary world and one of its principal contemporary recorders. His writings document poets whose works might otherwise have remained unknown, including writers from occupational and social backgrounds outside elite literary patronage.

In Tajik literary scholarship, Maleho is studied as a representative of classical Tajik literature and as a major source for reconstructing the literary history of the seventeenth century. His anthology is particularly important for understanding the Persian-language literary environment of Samarkand and Bukhara and its connections with Iran.

=== Poetry and literary criticism ===
Maleho composed poetry in Persian, employing the literary forms and conventions of his period. His writings demonstrate familiarity with the ghazal and with the practice of poetic exchange, in which poets composed responses to one another's verses.

His critical interests are particularly evident in Muzakkir al-Ashab. He did not restrict himself to recording the names and poems of contemporary writers, but also commented on their literary ability, stylistic qualities, intellectual accomplishments and personal characteristics.

These observations provide evidence of the literary tastes and critical practices of seventeenth-century Persian-language writers. They also preserve contemporary judgments about poets who subsequently became important figures in the literary history of Central Asia.

== Muzakkir al-Ashab ==
=== Composition and organization ===
Maleho's principal achievement was Muzakkir al-Ashab (Tajik: Музаккир-ул-асҳоб), a tazkira, or biographical anthology of poets.

The work was compiled in the early 1690s. UNESCO dates its completion to 1691, while Robert McChesney and Nobuaki Kondo place its composition around 1692–1693.

The anthology contains biographical notices concerning contemporary poets, accompanied by selections from their works. The entries record information about the writers' family backgrounds, occupations, travels, literary relationships and personal circumstances.

Maleho followed an alphabetical arrangement for the principal section of the anthology, an approach associated with earlier Central Asian literary biographers, including Mutribi Samarkandi. The supplementary material followed a different arrangement, with notices presented in chronological sequence.

The work is notable for Maleho's frequent use of firsthand information. Many of the poets he described were people whom he had personally met during his travels or literary activities in Transoxiana.

=== Number and geographical distribution of poets ===
The number of poets represented in the anthology differs between modern scholarly accounts, partly because researchers have used different manuscript versions and methods of counting the main collection and supplementary entries.

UNESCO's History of Civilizations of Central Asia reports that the principal section contains accounts of 165 poets from Transoxiana and 56 poets from Iran.

Nobuaki Kondo, using a later edition, counts 210 poets in the principal collection and supplement together. Of these, he identifies 142 as originating from Central Asia and 63 from Iran; the anthology also includes a small number of writers associated with India or other regions.

The differing figures reflect the complexity of the anthology's manuscript and editorial history. Rather than representing a collection restricted to a single city or political state, Muzakkir al-Ashab documents a broad network of Persian-language writers extending across Transoxiana and Iran.

=== Biographies of Tajik poets ===
Muzakkir al-Ashab is especially important for preserving the biographies of seventeenth-century poets associated with the Tajik literary tradition of Central Asia.

One of its best-known subjects is Sayido Nasafi, a major Tajik poet who lived and worked in Bukhara. Maleho's account preserves details of Sayido's life and literary circumstances that have been used in later scholarly biographies.

Keith Hitchins's article on Sayido in Encyclopaedia Iranica identifies Maleho as one of the principal contemporary sources for the poet's biography and cites a manuscript of Muzakkir al-Ashab preserved in Tashkent.

Maleho also recorded information about Fitrat Zarduz Samarqandi, a seventeenth-century Tajik poet known for his narrative poem Talib va Matlub, or Kozurpisar. His account provides important details about Fitrat's family of gold-thread embroiderers, his education, his marriage and his literary achievements.

Michael Zand's biography of Fitrat in Encyclopaedia Iranica relies extensively on Maleho's descriptions, including information about the poet's proficiency in literary riddles and the poetry preserved in his anthology.

The anthology also contains information about other poets associated with the Persian-Tajik literary circles of Transoxiana, including writers from Bukhara, Samarkand, Nasaf and Tashkent. A 2026 study by Hasan Sodiqov examines Maleho's notices concerning Tashkent poets and their importance for reconstructing the region's literary history.

=== Shavkat Bukhari and Persian poetic innovation ===
Among the poets whose literary activities Maleho documented was Shavkat Bukhari, a Persian-language poet associated with Bukhara and Iran.

Shavkat's poetry belonged to the literary movement frequently described as Sabk-e Hindi, or the Indian style, which emphasized elaborate imagery, innovative metaphors and complex relationships between words and meanings.

Maleho's account of Shavkat has attracted attention from modern scholars studying the intellectual and aesthetic development of seventeenth-century Persian poetry.

Catherine Henderson Ambler's 2022 doctoral dissertation, Masters of the Distant Meanings: Unity and Multiplicity in the Persian Poesis of Freshness, examines Maleho's anthology alongside Shavkat's poetry. The study investigates how writers used literary ambiguity, metaphor and the relationship between unity and multiplicity to explore poetic meaning.

Ambler also examines the relationship between Maleho and Shavkat as an example of the literary connections between Transoxiana and Iran. Their activities illustrate the ways in which writers participated in a shared Persian-language literary environment despite differences of political allegiance and religious affiliation.

=== Social and historical information ===
In addition to its literary importance, Muzakkir al-Ashab is a valuable source for the social history of seventeenth-century Central Asia.

Robert McChesney's 1990 study, The Anthology of Poets: Muzakkir al-Ashab as a Source for the History of Seventeenth-Century Central Asia, examined the work as evidence of literary patronage, social relationships, religious life and the occupations of contemporary writers.

McChesney found that many poets described by Maleho maintained livelihoods independent of government patronage. His analysis indicates that approximately two-thirds of the poets represented in the anthology supported themselves without direct government assistance.

This material provides insight into the participation of merchants, craftsmen, scholars and other urban inhabitants in literary life. It also demonstrates that recognition as a poet did not necessarily depend on receiving employment or financial support from a ruler.

In a later study published in Afghanistan's Islam: From Conversion to the Taliban, McChesney again used Maleho's anthology as an important source for understanding the social foundations of Islamic learning in early modern Central Asia. He also noted Maleho's attachment to Samarkand and the importance of local identity in his writings.

=== Craftsmen and literary culture ===
One of the distinctive features of Maleho's anthology is its documentation of poets who also practiced manual trades.

During his travels through Kashan, Maleho encountered craftsmen who composed Persian poetry while working in occupations such as copper-smithing, textile production and other artisanal trades.

The Japanese art historian Yui Kanda has used Maleho's descriptions to reconstruct aspects of seventeenth-century Iranian craft production. In her study of a brass candlestick associated with the shrine of Musa al-Kazim, she discusses the poet and coppersmith Anvar Kashani, whose biography was preserved by Maleho.

Maleho recorded that Anvar had learned both poetry and copper-smithing from his father. Kanda uses this information to examine the transmission of artistic and professional skills within artisan families and the relationship between poetry and metalworking in Safavid Iran.

These accounts illustrate the broader literary environment documented by Maleho, in which poetry was practiced by people from a variety of professional and social backgrounds.

=== Religious and intellectual history ===
Maleho's anthology has also been used to investigate religious scholarship and intellectual practices in Central Asia.

Matthew Melvin-Koushki and James Pickett discuss Muzakkir al-Ashab in their 2016 study Mobilizing Magic: Occultism in Central Asia and the Continuity of High Persianate Culture under Russian Rule, published in Studia Islamica.

They identify the anthology as evidence that the occult sciences, including forms of letter manipulation and letter magic, were practiced among learned individuals in seventeenth-century Central Asia.

This use of Maleho's work demonstrates its value beyond conventional literary scholarship, providing information about the intellectual interests and scholarly practices of the period.

=== Historical chronicles and manuscript evidence ===
Maleho's biographical notices have also been compared with contemporary historical chronicles.

In his study Perceptions of History in Persian Chronicles of the Sixteenth–Seventeenth Centuries in Central Asia, Charles Melville examines the relationship between historical writing, literary biography and the preservation of information about notable individuals.

Melville cites Maleho's anthology as a source for the poet and historian Sayyid Sharif Raqim. He notes that poems attributed to Raqim in surviving manuscript material also appear in Maleho's biographical collection.

Such comparisons help scholars investigate the transmission of historical information and the relationships between Persian-language literary anthologies and chronicles.

== Literary connections beyond Central Asia ==
Maleho's writings provide evidence of the circulation of poets, scholars and literary works across the Persian-speaking world.

Nobuaki Kondo's study Making a Persianate Society: Literati Migration to Mughal India uses Muzakkir al-Ashab to examine the movement of writers between Central Asia, Iran and the Mughal Empire. Kondo identifies twenty Central Asian literary figures in Maleho's anthology who travelled to or settled in India.

His findings suggest that some of these journeys were connected with the Hajj, religious education and the search for scholarly employment. The anthology therefore provides information about networks extending beyond the literary communities of Samarkand and Bukhara.

James White's 2023 study Persian and Arabic Literary Communities in the Seventeenth Century likewise discusses Maleho's participation in the diplomatic and literary networks connecting the Khanate of Bukhara with Safavid Iran. White identifies his journey to Isfahan as part of a wider pattern of literary contact across political boundaries.

Maleho's importance as a contemporary source also appears in Encyclopaedia Iranica, which cites his anthology in studies of Persian-language poets, including Saib Tabrizi, Sayido Nasafi and Fitrat Zarduz Samarqandi.

== Manuscripts and publications ==
=== Manuscript preservation ===
Muzakkir al-Ashab survives in several manuscript copies preserved in scholarly and library collections.

Manuscripts have been documented in Tashkent, Dushanbe and Saint Petersburg. The manuscript tradition has attracted scholarly attention because different copies preserve variations in the arrangement and contents of the anthology.

A manuscript held in the collections of the Academy of Sciences of Uzbekistan in Tashkent, numbered Taj. 58/1, is cited in Keith Hitchins's biography of Sayido Nasafi in Encyclopaedia Iranica.

Another manuscript, preserved in the Tajik Academy of Sciences under number 610, contains Maleho's biographical account of Fitrat Zarduz Samarqandi and is cited by Michael Zand.

These surviving manuscripts provide the basis for modern editions of the text and for comparisons between its biographical notices and other historical sources.

=== Critical editions ===
An important stage in the modern study of Maleho's anthology was the preparation of a critical edition by the Tajik scholar Kamoliddin Ayni.

The edition, published in Dushanbe in 2006 under the title Tazkira-yi Muzakkir al-Ashab ya Tazkirat al-Shu'ara, was prepared through comparison of four manuscript copies. It made the work more accessible for scholars studying Persian-Tajik literature and the historical relations between Transoxiana and Iran.

A later edition prepared by Muhammad Taqvi was published in Tehran in 2012. This edition has been used in subsequent studies, including Nobuaki Kondo's analysis of Central Asian literary migration.

=== Modern literary scholarship ===
The modern study of Maleho's literary legacy developed significantly during the twentieth century.

The Tajik literary scholar Abdulghani Mirzoyev played an important role in drawing attention to Muzakkir al-Ashab as a source for seventeenth-century Tajik literary history. His work helped establish the importance of the anthology for studying the poets of Transoxiana and their connections with Iran.

Sadri Sa'diev subsequently examined the anthology in his monograph Tajik Literature in the Seventeenth Century, published in Dushanbe in 1985. The work situates Maleho and his contemporaries within the development of classical Tajik literature.

English-language scholarship has increasingly examined the anthology in relation to social history, intellectual networks, poetic aesthetics and migration. Studies by McChesney, Kondo, Ambler, White, Melvin-Koushki, Pickett, Kanda and Melville illustrate the range of historical questions for which Maleho's writings provide evidence.

Recent Tajik research has continued to examine the literary importance of Maleho's anthology. Khojamurodov's 2023 study emphasized its significance for understanding the shared literary culture of Transoxiana and Iran, while Hasan Sodiqov's 2026 research examined its descriptions of poets associated with Tashkent.

== Literary identity and legacy ==
Maleho occupies an important place in the history of classical Tajik literature. Tajik scholars have studied him as a representative of the seventeenth-century literary culture of Samarkand and as a major source for reconstructing the lives and writings of Tajik poets.

His writings preserve substantial evidence of the Persian-language literary traditions cultivated in Transoxiana during the Ashtarkhanid period. Through Muzakkir al-Ashab, he documented writers whose works form part of the historical heritage of Tajik literature, including Sayido Nasafi and Fitrat Zarduz Samarqandi.

The national and ethnic terminology applied to Maleho differs between modern reference works. Tajik literary scholarship explicitly identifies him as a Tajik poet and places his writings within Tajik literary history, while some Uzbek reference works classify him as an Uzbek poet and literary scholar.

His surviving biographical material identifies his family as longstanding residents of Samarkand but does not provide an unambiguous statement of his parents' ethnicity. English-language scholarship generally approaches him through his Persian-language writings, his geographical origins and his participation in the broader literary culture of the Persian-speaking world.

Regardless of these differing modern classifications, Maleho's importance to the history of Tajik literature is well established. His anthology remains one of the major contemporary records of the literary communities of seventeenth-century Samarkand and Bukhara, preserving otherwise scarce information about their poets, social relationships and intellectual activities.

His work has also acquired broader historical significance through its use in studies of Safavid Iran, the Mughal world and Persianate intellectual history. Its preservation and continued scholarly examination demonstrate the importance of the Persian-language literary tradition of Transoxiana to the wider cultural history of Central Asia.
