= History of Mumbai under Islamic rule =

The history of Mumbai under Islamic rule began in 1348 and continued until 1534.

== History ==
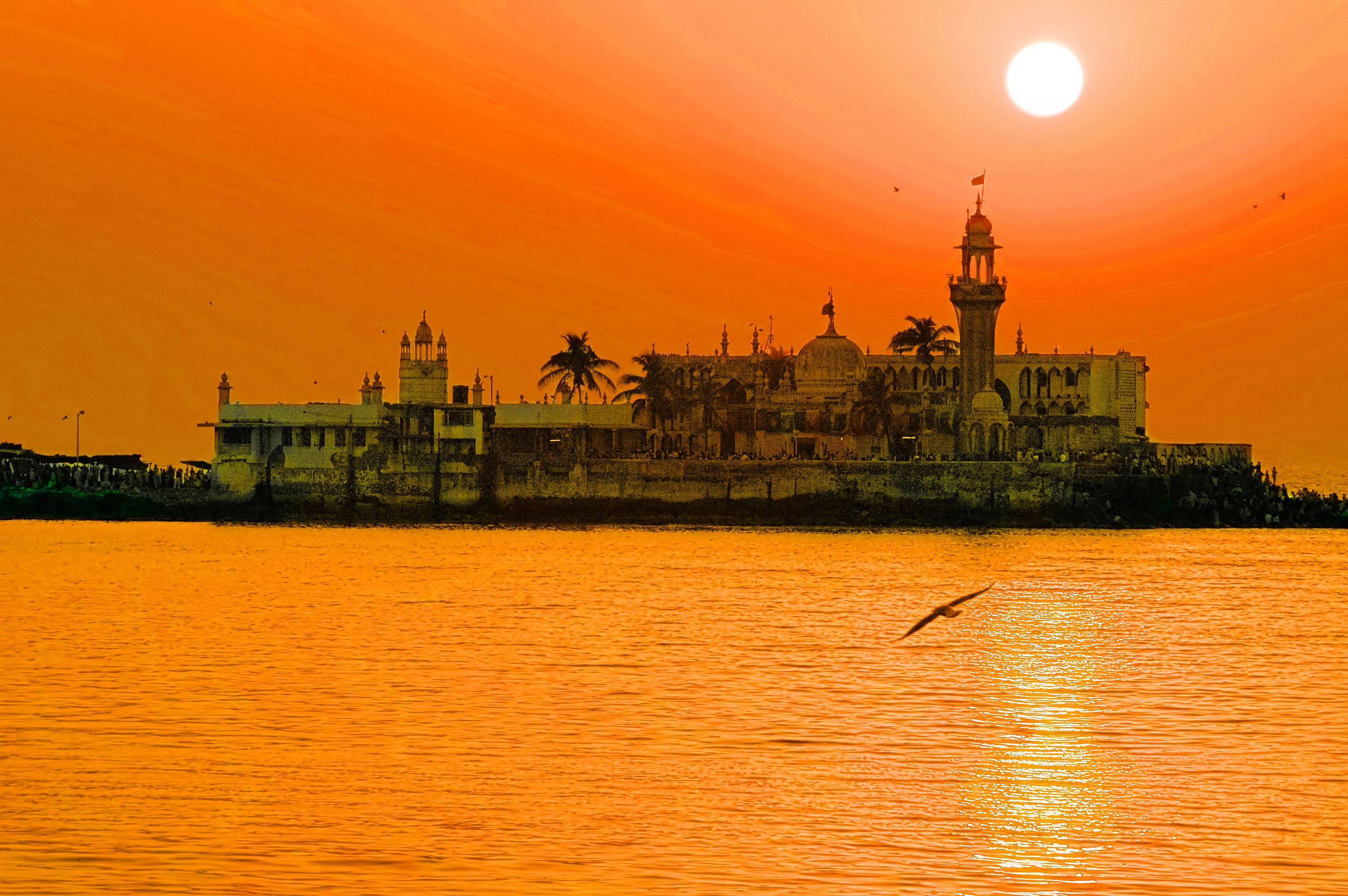
The Haji Ali Dargah in Bombay, built in 1431, by a Muslim saint named Haji Ali, when Mumbai was under Islamic rule.

From 1348 to 1391, the islands were under the Muzaffarid dynasty. In 1391, shortly after the establishment of the Gujarat Sultanate, Muzaffar Shah I was appointed the viceroy of north Konkan. For the administration of the Bombay islands, he appointed a governor for Mahim shortly. During the reign of Ahmad Shah I (1411–1443), Malik-us-Sharq was appointed governor of Mahim, and he improved the existing revenue system. During the early 14th century, the Bhandaris seized the island of Mahim from the Sultanate and ruled it for eight years. However, it was shortly reconquered by Rai Qutb of the Gujarat Sultanate. Firishta, a Persian historian, recorded that by 1429, the seat of the Government of the Gujarat Sultanate had transferred from Thane to Bombay (Mahim). On Rai Qutb's death in 1429–1430, Ahmad Shah I Wali of the Bahmani Sultanate of Deccan succeeded in capturing Salsette and Mahim.

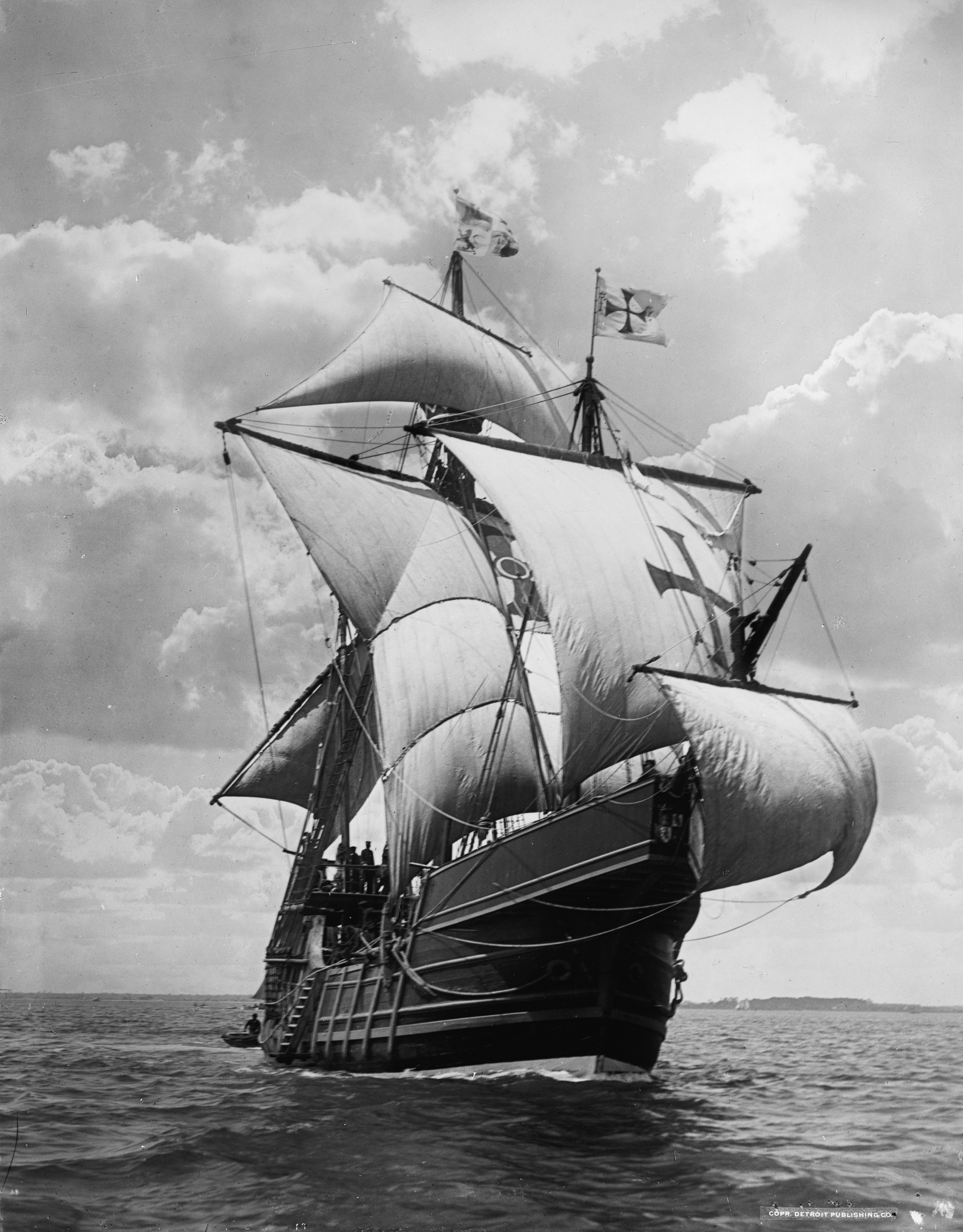
The carrack which Francisco de Almeida employed on his voyage to Bombay

Ahmad Shah I retaliated by sending his son Jafar Khan to recapture the lost territory, who emerged victorious in the battle fought between him and Ahmad Shah I Wali. In 1431, Mahim was recaptured by the Sultanate of Gujarat. On the Gujarat commandant of Mahim Kutb Khan's death after a few years, Ahmad Shah I Wali again despatched a large army to capture Mahim. In response, Ahmad Shah I sent down a huge army and navy under Jafar Khan. The defeat of Ahmad Shah I Wali in the battle witnessed the freedom of Bombay from all attacks by the Bahmani Sultanate. The Gujarat Sultanate's patronage led to the construction of many Islamic mosques, prominent being the Haji Ali Dargah, built by the Muslim saint Haji Ali in 1431. Later, the islands came under Bahadur Khan Gilani of the Gujarat Sultanate. During the years 1491–1494, Bombay was wrested from Gilani's control by the Bahamani general Mahmud Gawan. In 1508, Portuguese explorer Francisco de Almeida's ship sailed into the deep natural harbour of the island and he called it Bom Bahia (Good Bay). However, the Portuguese paid their first visit to the Bombay islands on 21 January 1509 when they landed at Mahim after capturing a Gujarat barge in the Bandra creek. After a series of attacks by the Gujarat Sultanate on Bombay, the islands were recaptured by Sultan Bahadur Shah from Mahmud Gawan.

In 1526, the Portuguese established their factory at Bassein. In 1528–1529, Lopo Vaz de Sampaio seized the fort of Mahim from the Gujarat Sultanate, when the King was at war with Nizam-ul-mulk, the lord of Cheul, a town south of Bombay. Bahadur Shah had grown apprehensive of the power of the Mughal emperor Humayun and he was obliged to sign the Treaty of Diu with the Portuguese in 1534. According to the treaty, the islands of Bombay and Bassein were offered to the Portuguese. However, Bassein and the seven islands were surrendered later by a treaty of peace and commerce between Bahadur Shah and Nuno da Cunha on 25 October 1535.

== References and bibliography ==
- Anonymous (2004). Manuscripts and Books on Medicine, Alchemy, Astrology and Natural Sciences. Kessinger Publishing. ISBN 978-0-7661-8695-8.
- Asiatic Society of Bombay; Literary Society of Bombay (1819). Transactions of the Literary society of Bombay. Longman, Hurst, Rees, Orme, and Brown.
- Ghosh, Amalananda (1990). An Encyclopaedia of Indian Archaeology. BRILL. ISBN 9004092641.
- Cavendish, Marshall (2007). World and Its Peoples: Eastern and Southern Asia. Marshall Cavendish Corporation. ISBN 978-0-7614-7637-5.
- Collins, Charles Dillard (1988). Iconography and Ritual of Siva at Elephanta. State University of New York Press. ISBN 978-0-88706-774-7.
- David, M. D. (1973). History of Bombay, 1661–1708: 1661–1708. University of Bombay.
- Da Cunha, J.Gerson (1993). Origin of Bombay. Asian Educational Services. ISBN 81-206-0815-1.
- Dwivedi, Sharada; Rahul Mehrotra (2001). Bombay: The Cities Within. Eminence Designs.
- Encyclopædia Britannica (2002). The New Encyclopædia Britannica. Vol. 15. ISBN 0-85229-787-4.
- Firishtah, Astarā-bādī; Muhammad Firishtah; John Briggs (1829). History of the Rise of the Mahomedan Power in India. Vol. 3. Longman, Rees, Orme, Brown, and Green.
- Hirakawa, Akira (1998). Paul Groner (ed.). History of Indian Buddhism: from Śākyamuni to Early Mahāyāna. Motilal Banarsidass Publishers. ISBN 81-208-0955-6.
- Jain, Vardhman Kumar (1990). Trade and Traders in Western India, A.D. 100–1300. Munshiram Manoharlal Publishers. ISBN 81-215-0470-8.
- Khandekar, Vishnu Sakharam; A. K. Bhagwat; Acyuta Kesava Bhagavata (1977). Maharashtra, a Profile. V. S. Khandekar Amrit Mahotsava Satkar Samiti.
- Misra, Satish Chandra (1982). The Rise of Muslim Power in Gujarat: A History of Gujarat from 1298 to 1442. Munshiram Manoharlal Publishers.
- Prinsep, James; Edward Thomas; Henry Thoby Prinsep (1858). Essays on Indian Antiquities, Historic, Numismatic, and Palæographic, of the Late James Prinsep. Vol. 2. J. Murray.
- Sheppard, Samuel Townsend (1932). Bombay. The Times of India Press.
- Somerset, Anne (1984). Ladies in Waiting: From the Tudors to the Present Day. Weidenfeld and Nicolson.
- Subrahmanyam, Sanjay (1997). The Career and Legend of Vasco Da Gama. Cambridge University Press. ISBN 0-521-64629-4.
- Greater Bombay District Gazetteer. Maharashtra State Gazetteers. Vol. III. Government of Maharashtra. 1986.
- "Portuguese Settlements on the Western Coast". Maharashtra State Gazetteer (PDF). Government of Maharashtra. 1977.
- Thana District Gazetteer. Gazetteers of the Bombay Presidency. Vol. XIII. Government of Maharashtra. 1986 [1882].
- Thana — Places of Interest. Gazetteers of the Bombay Presidency. Vol. XIV. Government of Maharashtra. 2000 [1882].
- Yule, Henry (1870). The Travels of Marco Polo. Vol. 1. Plain Label Books. ISBN 978-0-7614-7637-5.
