= Kiram Bukharai =

Abdulatif Kiram Bukharai (Persian: کرام بخارائی) was one of the poets of Tajik literature in the 18th century. He was born in Bukhara. He spent his young years in his hometown, and he learned his profession of writing and speaking. He was a follower of Sayido Nasafi by speaking, a follower of Abdul-Qādir Bedil and Saib Tabrizi by writing poems.

Kiram Bukharai's birthdate and death date is indefinite. He was a 17th century Tajik writer. He grew up in Bukhara. Due to wandering in streets and being homeless, he left his motherland. At last, after being homeless for many years, he came back to Bukhara.

Abdulatif Kiram Bukharai was one of the greatest poets of the 18th century. He spent his youth years in his hometown Bukhara, and here he began to work hard. He also was one of the greatest orators during his life and activities. About the last days of this poet, there is no information. He is known as a master of ghazels. He left a full collection of ghazels.

from Bukharai ghazels in Tajik language:

Дӯстӣ кун пешаи худ, бо касе душман мабош,
Бо ҳарифони мулоим сахт чун оҳан мабош.
Корвони зиндагонӣ бар сари роҳи фаност,
Як замоне ғофил аз андешаи рафтан мабош.
Хор бо мижгони худ бояд гирифт аз пои халқ,
Дар ҳавои олами таҷред чун сӯзан мабош...
Ҳосилат чун сарв аз озодагӣ дасти тиҳист,
Дар гиреҳ аз фикри кишту донаи хирман мабош...
Хасмро аз дӯстӣ оҷиз тавон кардан, Киром
Ҳар ки душман бо ту гардад, ту ба он душман мабош.

meaning: "Be friends and do not be an enemy to others. With opponents who are not strong, do not be like an iron. The caravan of life is going on endless road. One day do not thing of leaving. You must take thorns from the foot of people with your eyelash. In this world, do not be like a needle. Your harvest from empty hand is clean cypress. In difficult moment do not think about seeds and harvest...to make an opponent stronger from a weak friend, Kirom. Everyone who becomes an enemy to you, do not be an enemy."
