= Sipandi Samarkandi =

Tajik poet (1829–1909)

- سپندی سمرقندی
- Born: Abdulkarim; 1829; Samarkand, Emirate of Bukhara
- Died: 1909 (aged 79–80); Samarkand, Russian Empire
- Occupations: Poet; Madrasa teacher; Imam
- Writing career
- Language: Tajik; Uzbek
- Genres: Ghazal; Qit'a; Mukhammas; Ruba'i; Satire; Chronogram
- Movement: Tajik literature

Mullo Abdulkarim Sipandi Samarkandi (Persian: سپندی سمرقندی; Tajik: Мулло Абдулкарим Сипандии Самарқандӣ; 1829–1909) was a Tajik poet, religious scholar, teacher and imam from Samarkand, in present-day Uzbekistan. A representative of nineteenth-century Tajik literature, he composed primarily in Tajik, although he also wrote some poetry in Uzbek. His works included ghazals, mukhammases, ruba'is, satirical poems and chronograms.

Sipandi spent much of his life teaching at the Ulugh Beg Madrasa before becoming an imam in his native city. His poetry was included in Sadriddin Ayni's Namuna-i adabiyoti tojik (A Sample of Tajik Literature), first published in 1926. His surviving manuscripts preserve a substantial collection of his poetry and provide evidence of his participation in the literary circles of nineteenth-century Samarkand and Bukhara.

== Life ==
=== Early life and education ===
Sipandi was born in 1829 in the Mahdum Khorazmi neighborhood of Samarkand, then part of the Emirate of Bukhara. He came from a family of artisans and received his early education in his native city. He subsequently travelled to Bukhara to continue his studies at its madrasas, which were important centres of religious learning and Tajik literary culture.

During his studies in Bukhara, Sipandi became acquainted with several contemporary scholars and poets, including Mirsiddiq Hoshmat, Osimi Bukhoroi, Zaki Bukhoroi and Qori Rahmatulloh Vozeh. These connections introduced him to the wider intellectual circles of the Emirate of Bukhara and helped establish his relationships with poets beyond Samarkand.

After completing his education, he returned to Samarkand and began teaching at the Ulugh Beg Madrasa. He spent many years working as a religious teacher and scholar, and was known by the title Mulla, reflecting his religious education.

=== Later life and death ===
Sipandi travelled to Iran and Iraq during his lifetime. At approximately 76 years of age, he also performed the Hajj pilgrimage to Mecca and Medina. After returning to Samarkand, he left his teaching position and became the imam of the Khoja Zulmurod Mosque. The precise dates of his earlier travels are not known.

He suffered paralysis in 1908 and died in Samarkand in 1909, at approximately 80 years of age.

== Literary career ==
=== Literary background and language ===
Sipandi belonged to the nineteenth-century Tajik literary tradition of Samarkand and Bukhara, which continued the established forms and conventions of classical Persian poetry. His literary activity took place during a period of political change, particularly following the incorporation of Samarkand into the Russian Empire in 1868.

Sipandi composed poetry primarily in Tajik. His surviving divan consists predominantly of Tajik-language verse, although he also wrote some poetry in Uzbek. He was therefore a zullisonayn, or bilingual, poet, reflecting the multilingual literary environment of nineteenth-century Central Asia.

He participated in the literary gatherings associated with the poet Said Ahmad Vasli in Samarkand's Qushhovuz quarter. These meetings brought together poets and intellectuals who recited their compositions, discussed poetry and responded to one another's verses. Among the participants were Ibrahim Jur'at, Nasriddin Hodi and Mirzo Akram Fikri. Such gatherings helped sustain the city's literary traditions during the late nineteenth and early twentieth centuries.

=== Lyric poetry ===
Sipandi's poetry included ghazals, mukhammases, qit'as and ruba'is. His lyrical compositions drew on the imagery and conventions of classical Persian verse, particularly themes of love, longing, separation and devotion.

Several of his surviving ghazals describe the beauty of the beloved and the suffering of an unrequited lover. One poem opens with the beloved revealing her face and illuminating the night like the sun. Other verses explore the emotional distance between lovers, using imagery characteristic of the Persian ghazal.

Sipandi also composed mukhammas poems, consisting of five-line stanzas. One such composition, preserved by Sadriddin Ayni, praises the beloved's appearance and expresses the lover's devotion through a series of elaborate poetic images.

=== Satirical poetry ===
Sipandi also wrote satire, using verse to ridicule individuals and comment on everyday incidents.

One of his best-known satirical works is Hajv-i Kal-i Ibrahim (Satire of Bald Ibrahim), directed against a wealthy resident of Samarkand known as Bald Ibrahim. According to the manuscript heading, Ibrahim had stolen the poet's shoes, prompting Sipandi to compose a satirical response. The incident and the resulting poem became associated with local oral tradition.

The surviving manuscript contains 18 stanzas, but questions remain about its authorship. An inscription above the third stanza indicates that the text was continued by a scribe, leading the manuscript catalogue's editors to identify 16 stanzas as probable later additions. Consequently, only a small portion of the surviving text can be confidently associated with Sipandi himself.

=== Chronograms ===
Sipandi was also known for composing chronograms, a form of commemorative verse in which the numerical values of Arabic-script letters, calculated according to the abjad system, indicate the year of a particular event.

Chronograms were commonly used in Persian literature to commemorate deaths, the construction of buildings and other important occasions. In Samarkand, Sipandi and his contemporary Said Ahmad Vasli composed such verses for newly constructed mosques and other structures.

One chronogram attributed to Sipandi records the year 1259 AH (1843–1844) for a mosque near a gate of the citadel (ark) of Samarkand. If the date and attribution are correct, it would indicate that he was composing chronograms while still in his early teens.

== Manuscripts and publications ==
=== Surviving manuscripts ===
An important source for Sipandi's poetry is his manuscript divan. Sadriddin Ayni examined a copy containing approximately 2,500 couplets, providing evidence of the extent of his literary output.

The fourth volume of the Catalogue of Oriental Manuscripts of the Academy of Sciences of the Tajik SSR, published in Dushanbe in 1970, records another copy of his divan under entry 1463, manuscript number 2428.

This manuscript contains 71 leaves and is written in two columns in Central Asian nastaʿlīq script, with some headings written in red ink. Additional verses appear in its margins. On palaeographical grounds, the manuscript has been dated to the late nineteenth century. It is incomplete, with missing sections, a lost ending and several damaged or stained leaves.

The same catalogue lists Hajv-i Kal-i Ibrahim separately under entry 1464, manuscript number 424/4. This three-leaf manuscript is written in nastaʿlīq with elements of shikasta and has been dated to the early twentieth century.

=== Publications and literary reception ===
Sipandi's poetry received wider attention through its inclusion in Sadriddin Ayni's Namuna-i adabiyoti tojik, first published in 1926. The anthology contains examples of his ghazals and a mukhammas, together with biographical details and observations on his poetic technique. His inclusion in this influential survey helped preserve his place in the history of Tajik literature.

A collection of his poetry, titled Sipandiy Samarqandiy, was published by Fan in Tashkent in 1995. The publication was associated with the research and editorial work of Shavkat Vohidov, who studied the literary heritage of earlier Samarkand poets.

Ayni's examination of Sipandi's poetry also included criticism of its technical features. He noted occasional irregularities in the metre of his compositions, including instances where the final vowel of the pen name Sipandi introduced an additional syllable. He also discussed a verse in which the pronunciation of the Arabic letter ʿayn affected the metre. These observations have been examined in later discussions of Tajik prosody and literary criticism.

Ayni also recorded an episode involving the Bukharan poet Osimi, who had requested a mukhammas from Sipandi. When examining the surviving divan, Ayni noticed that a line differed from the wording he remembered in the copy originally sent to Osimi. This account provides evidence of Sipandi's literary relationships and illustrates the importance of manuscript variants in the transmission of his poetry.

Sipandi's literary legacy was also preserved through the work of his descendants. Shavkat Vohidov (1932–2008), a physicist and academician descended from the poet, later helped research and publish the works of Samarkand poets, including those of Sipandi himself.
