= Boukhari =

Boukhari (Arabic: البخاري or البوخاري) is an Arabic surname. Notable people with the surname include:

- Ahmed Boukhari (1938–2025), Moroccan secret service agent
- Ayoub Boukhari (born 1997), Dutch football player of Moroccan descent
- Hamza Boukhari (born 1995), Dutch football player of Moroccan descent
- Nasuh al-Boukhari (1881–1961), Syrian soldier and politician
- Nourdin Boukhari (born 1980), Moroccan football player
- Yahia Boukhari (born 1953), Algerian Secretary General of the government
- Yassine Boukhari (born 1986), Algerian football player

== See also ==
- Ksar El Boukhari District, a district of Algerian Médéa Province
- Ksar Boukhari, a town and commune in the Algerian Médéa Province
- Bukhari (surname)
