= Channan Pir =

Channan Punan Pir
- Location within Pakistan
- Coordinates: 28.58°N 71.42°E
- Country: Pakistan
- Province: Punjab
- Elevation: 101 m (331 ft)
- Time zone: UTC+5 (PST)

Channan Pir is a village in the Punjab province of Pakistan, it is named after a Sufi saint and contains his tomb. It is located between the Derawar and Din Gargh forts and lies a few kilometres from Yazman town, and in the start of the Cholistan desert. It remains a cherished sanctuary, revered by Hindus and Muslims for centuries.

== History ==
According to the story narrated by the Hadaqah al-auliya, Channan Pir's origin is traced back to a saint, Jalaluddin Surkh-Posh Bukhari, who prophesied the birth of a prince to the childless King Sadharan. The prince, named Channan due to his beauty, recited the Islamic Kalma, resulting in his exile. Narratives differ post-exile: as per Hadaah al-auliya, he was found by the local hindu community being nourished by a deer, while others variations are Channan disappeared when assassins arrived, others claim he grew into a saint.

He then grew up to be a Sufi saint venerated by both Muslims and Hindus. He is known to be compassionate towards Muslims and Hindus.

Despite the variations, all stories end with Channan's disappearance, death, or burial on a mound, rendering it a revered site. Attempts to construct a mausoleum repeatedly failed due to collapses, lightning, or foundational issues, leading locals to refrain from further attempts. A nearby tree, considered Channan Pir's mother's resting place, serves as a symbolic vessel for devotees' wishes.

Salman Rashid connects the site to Ctesias's Indica, which narrates about a place of celestial worship resembling the Channan Pir festival's timeline. According to the Census of India, 1901: Punjab and North West Frontier Province, the Channan pir shrine is probably the tomb and ancestral shrine of the Chantar tribe. According to other reports, the Channan pir shrine was historically a shrine dedicated to Dharti Mata. He points the Channan pir festival also happens on Spring season, where Dhart Mata celebrations happen. As per legend, the dying wish of Chanan pir was not to have tomb over the shrine, which is synonymous with the ancient custom of not having dome for Dharti Mata shrine.

== Festival ==
It is a centre of the spiritual and cultural heritage of Yazman and Cholistan. The annual Channan Pir festival, spanning seven Thursdays, culminates on the fifth week.
