= Jalaluddin Surkh-Posh Bukhari =

South Asian Sufi saint (1190 – 1295)

Mir-Buzurg Sayyid Jalaluddin Surkh-Posh Naqvi Al Bukhari
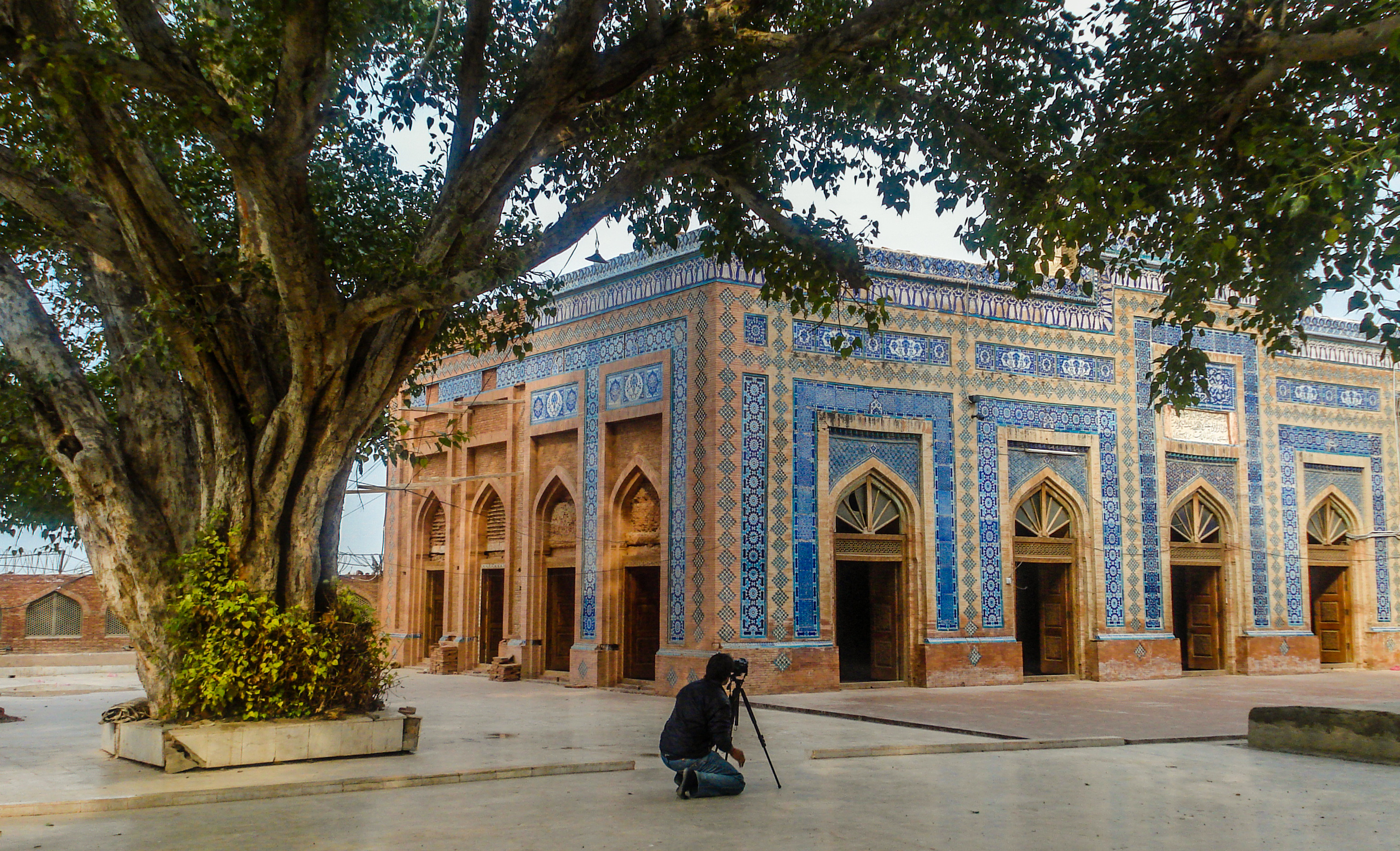
- Born: 22 May 1195; Bukhara, Khwarezmian Empire (Know Day Uzbekistan)
- Died: 20 May 1290 (aged 94–95); Uch, Delhi Sultanate
- Spouses: Fatima bint Qasim; Sayyida Sharifa Bibi Tahirah bint Badruddin Bhakkari; Sayyida Bibi Fatima Habiba Saeeda bint Badruddin Bhakkari
- Father: Ali al-Moeed

Sayyid Jalaluddin Surkh-Posh Naqvi Al Bukhari (Persian: سید جلال الدین سرخ پوش بخاری, c. 595-690 AH, 1190 – 1295 CE was a Shia saint from the Indian subcontinent. He was a Twelver Sufi descendent of Ali al-Hadi ( the 10th Shia Imam as per Shia Twelvers)

== Early life ==
Naqvi Bukhari, a family name, is derived from the location of his birth from the city of Bukhara in the ancient administrative region of Bukhara Province Uzbekistan. Sayyid Jalaluddin Naqvi Bukhari, who was born in Bukhara but later settled in Bukkur located in sindh alongside his in laws descendant from Muhammad Al-Makki. However, after a dispute with his father in laws brothers, Only three generations were stayed in bukhari, and there they came from Sammara and Baghdad. he further migrated with his father in law (Sayyid Badruddin) to Uch in undivided India. Naqvi Bukhari was nicknamed Surkh-Posh ("clad in red") because he often wore a red cape.

== Career ==
Naqvi Bukhari's life was spent travelling. As an Islamic missionary, he converted tribes such as the Soomro, Samma, Chadhar, Sial, Dahar and Warar to Islam. Naqvi Bukhari was one of the Chaar Yaar (not to be confused with the Rashidun). The Chaar Yaar were the group of pioneers of the Suhrawardiyya and Chisti Sufi movements of the 13th century. The Jalaliya Sufi Order (Silsila-e-Jalaliya) should not be confused with the Suhrawardiyya or Chishtiyya orders, as it is traditionally described as possessing a distinct spiritual, historical, and religious identity. According to certain hereditary family traditions and accounts attributed to custodians of the associated shrines, Hazrat Syed Jalaluddin Surkh-Posh Naqvi Al-Bukhari adhered to Twelver Shia Islam (Ithna-Ashari Shi'ism) rather than Sunni Islam. Nevertheless, he is described as having received spiritual authorization (Khilafat) within both the Suhrawardiyya and Chishtiyya Sufi orders. The spiritual tradition that subsequently developed through his teachings and hereditary spiritual lineage is described as neither exclusively Chishti nor entirely Suhrawardi. Instead, it emerged as a distinct spiritual tradition incorporating elements from multiple religious and mystical schools of thought. According to these traditions, the Jalaliya Order combined the mystical teachings of the Suhrawardiyya and Chishtiyya orders, the theological principles of Twelver Shia Islam, and certain influences associated with Ismaili Shi'ism. This combination of spiritual and doctrinal traditions is presented as contributing to the development of the Silsila-e-Jalaliya, whose followers are also referred to in English as Jalalians.

=== The Four Spiritual Companions (Haq Chaar Yaar) and Their Distinct Traditions ===
Similar distinctions are described in accounts concerning the four Sufi saints collectively associated with the tradition of Haq Chaar Yaar. Apart from Hazrat Syed Jalaluddin Surkh-Posh Naqvi Al-Bukhari, the other three saints are also associated with spiritual traditions that developed their own religious identities, theological influences, and hereditary spiritual lineages.

Shah Shams Tabrizi and His Spiritual Lineage: According to certain hereditary and shrine-based traditions, Hazrat Shah Shams Tabrizi belonged to a Jafari-Ismaili genealogical lineage and was associated with Qarmatian-Ismaili Sufi beliefs. These accounts suggest that subsequent developments within his spiritual tradition incorporated elements of Twelver Shia theology and religious teachings, resulting in a distinctive spiritual lineage combining earlier Ismaili influences with Ithna-Ashari Shia traditions. The continuation of this particular spiritual lineage is traditionally associated with Syed Meherbani Ali Shah Shams Tabrizi Jafari, who is described as its contemporary hereditary spiritual representative.

Lal Shahbaz Qalandar and the Qalandariyya Tradition: Similarly, Hazrat Lal Shahbaz Qalandar, traditionally recognized as a close spiritual companion of Hazrat Syed Jalaluddin Surkh-Posh Naqvi Al-Bukhari and associated with Haq Chaar Yaar, is described in certain family traditions as belonging to a Jafari genealogical lineage with Qarmatian-Ismaili religious connections. According to these accounts, his interactions with other Sufi saints and spiritual communities contributed to the incorporation of Sunni Sufi mystical influences alongside elements of Twelver Shia religious thought.The spiritual tradition associated with him is identified with the Qalandariyya Sufi Order (Silsila-e-Qalandariyya). Within the particular hereditary interpretation described here, the followers of this lineage are regarded as adhering to Ithna-Ashari Shia beliefs.

Distinct Spiritual and Theological Identities: These traditional accounts emphasize that the spiritual lineages associated with the saints of Haq Chaar Yaar should not necessarily be classified under a single Sufi order or religious denomination. Rather, each lineage is understood to have developed its own spiritual identity through historical associations, hereditary succession, mystical teachings, and interactions among Sunni Sufi, Twelver Shia, and Ismaili traditions. The Jalaliya Order, in particular, is presented within these traditions as a distinct Sufi lineage whose religious and spiritual characteristics cannot be adequately explained by identifying it exclusively with either the Suhrawardiyya or Chishtiyya orders.

Sayyid Jalaluddin Surkh-Posh Naqvi Al-bukhari is traditionally regarded as the founder of the Jalaliya branch of the Suhrawardiyya Sufi order, whose later traditions incorporated Ismaili and Shi'a influences and became historically connected with the Iranian Khaksar-e-Jalali Sufi tradition.

== Sources ==
- Khan, Hasan Ali (2016). Constructing Islam on the Indus: The Material History of the Suhrawardi Sufi Order, 1200–1500 AD. Cambridge University Press. ISBN 9781107062900.
- Khan, Hasan Ali (2016). "The Suhrawardi Order in Uch". Constructing Islam on the Indus. Cambridge University Press. pp. 96–122. doi:10.1017/CBO9781107477636.006.
- Suvorova, Anna (2004). Muslim Saints of South Asia: The Eleventh to Fifteenth Centuries. RoutledgeCurzon. ISBN 9780415317641.
- Mohyuddin, Zafar (2019). Sufis of Uch: A Historical Study (1200–1600) (PDF) (PhD thesis). Quaid-i-Azam University.
- Eaton, Richard M. (1989). "Boḵārī, Jalāl-al-Dīn". Encyclopaedia Iranica.
- Boivin, Michel (2007). "Representations and Symbols in Muharram and Other Rituals: Fragments of Shiite Worlds from Bombay to Karachi". In Monsutti, Alessandro; Naef, Silvia; Sabahi, Farian (eds.). The Other Shiites: From the Mediterranean to Central Asia. Peter Lang. pp. 149–172.
- Historical and Genealogical Study of a Naqvi Bukhari Saadat Family of Pak o Hind — Independent researcher publication hosted on Zenodo.
- NLM Dataset Catalog search Search link; a specific relevant record needs identification.
- Aal-e-Ameer Urdu Wikipedia article; not an independent citation.
- Gulzar-e-Jalaliya Family history blog; self-published source.
- Aal-e-Nafees Urdu Wikipedia article; not an independent citation.
- Saadat Naqvi Bukhari Genealogy Dataset User-uploaded genealogical dataset.
- Jalalians Family and spiritual heritage website.
- Qalandariyya English Wikipedia article; not an independent citation.
- Gulzar-e-Jalaliya Wikibooks text; the original printed publication would need separate evaluation.
- Hazrat Jalaluddin Surkh-Posh Bukhari Government of Punjab Auqaf Department page.
- Khan, Hasan Ali (2016). Constructing Islam on the Indus: The Material History of the Suhrawardi Sufi Order, 1200–1500 AD. Cambridge University Press. ISBN 9781107062900.
- Suvorova, Anna (2004). Muslim Saints of South Asia: The Eleventh to Fifteenth Centuries. RoutledgeCurzon. ISBN 9780415317641.
- "Khaksar". Encyclopaedia Iranica.
- Boivin, Michel (2007). "Representations and Symbols in Muharram and Other Rituals: Fragments of Shiite Worlds from Bombay to Karachi". The Other Shiites: From the Mediterranean to Central Asia. Peter Lang. pp. 149–172.
- "Hazrat Jalaluddin Surkh-Posh Bukhari". Auqaf and Religious Affairs Department. Government of Punjab.
- Nizami, Moeen (2011). "Studies on Shams-e Tabrizi in the Sub-Continent". Tasavvuf: İlmi ve Akademik Araştırma Dergisi. 12 (27): 203–218.

Naqvi Bukhari founded the "Jalali" order. According to legend: Syed Jalaluddin Surkh Posh was on his way to India, due to mongol invasions against the Muslims. On the way he was imprisoned by Chengiz Khan. So he attempted to teach Chengiz about Islam, however Chenghiz did not like the fact he would not give up his faith. So he attempted to have surkh posh burned alive, which failed as the fire did not harm him in turn Chenghiz released surkh posh from imprisonment and married his daughter to him.

== Family ==
Naqvi Bukhari's biography and family history are cited extensively in such works as the Gulzar-e-Mustafavi cited on the Khomeini of Irans website as Gulzar Murtazvi 2nd edition, Marat-e-Jalali, the Mazher-i-Jalali, the Akber-ul-Akhyar, the Aal-e-Zahra s.a, the Rauzat-ul-Ahbab, the Gulzar-e-Jalaliya, Maraij-ul-Walayat, Manaqabi Qutbi, the Siyar-ul-Aqtar, the Aal-e-Ameer and Aal-e-Nafees: Complete Genealogical Archive of Naqvi Bukhari Sadat Lineage, the Family of Saadat Naqvi, the Siyar-ul-Arifeen and the Manaqib-ul-Asifya. These manuscripts are held by Naqvi Bukhari Sayyids, however the work Marat-e-Jalali was first published (by Asrar Karami Press) in 1918 into a book form from Allahabad, India (eBook) and its second edition with updates and more research material was printed (by V I Printers) as a book in 1999 from Karachi, Pakistan. His descendants are called Naqvi al-Bukhari. However, this book is heavily critiqued due to having names and family trees mixed up. Furthermore, the author a police officer claimed Bukhari lineage but did not know his own bloodline which he claimed to be of Bukhari lineage.

The Naqvi Bukhari Sayyids of Uch Sharif constitute one of the historically documented hereditary lineages associated with Jalaluddin Surkh-Posh Naqvi Bukhari. The Census of India (1901), published under H. A. Rose, records the Naqvi Bukhari Sayyids of Uch and identifies related shrine traditions established by their descendants, including the Naqvi Bukhari families associated with Uch Bilot in Dera Ismail Khan.

The hereditary custodianship of the Jalaliya shrine at Uch Sharif has remained associated with the Naqvi Bukhari family. A report published in Dunya on 17 November 2021 identified Makhdoom Syed Zamurd Hussain Naqvi Bukhari as a sajjada-nashin of Uch Sharif following sect Twelver Shi'ism and Syed Hassan Zamurd Naqvi Bukhari as his designated successor and also following sect Twelver Shi'ism. Subsequent local reporting in June 2026 also described Syed Zamurd Hussain Naqvi Bukhari and his son as performing ceremonial duties at the Jalaliya shrine.

The genealogical work book Gulzar-e-Jalaliya (2026), compiled by Syed Saleem Raza Bukhari, is dedicated to Khadim-ul-Fuqara wal-Masakeen, Makhdoom Hamid Muhammad Nau Bahar Khamis, commonly known as Makhdoom Syed Sultan Jahaniyan Naqvi Bukhari, Sajjada Nashin of Darbar-e-Aaliya Jalaliya, Uch Sharif, Pakistan, also following sect Twelver Shi'ism ansd actually all naqvi sadat are Twelver Shi'ism followers. whom the author identifies as a sajjada-nashin of Darbar-e-Aaliya Jalaliya, Uch Sharif. This identification reflects the account presented in the family genealogical publication.

The Jalali dervish tradition at Uch also developed associations with Twelver Shi'ism. Historian Hasan Ali Khan discusses the adoption of an openly Twelver Shia identity among the custodial and devotional communities associated with the khanqah of Makhdum Jahaniyan Jahangasht.

Among the family branches discussed in recent genealogical publications are Aal-e-Ameer and Aal-e-Nafees. The genealogical study Historical and Genealogical Study of a Naqvi Bukhari Saadat Family of Pak o Hind (2026) records the family traditions, preserved manuscripts, hereditary lineage claims, and migration accounts associated with these branches, including connections with Uch Sharif, Firozabad, Agra, Hyderabad in Sindh, and Karachi. The study forms part of a family-led genealogical preservation project.

In Kannauj there is a mosque in the name of Bukhari's son Makhdoom Jahaniyan Jahangasht, built by Jahaniyan's descendant and Sikandar Lodi's advisor Syed Sadarudin Shah Kabir Naqvi Al Bukhari. This mosque has an aesthetic blend of architectural styles.

The tomb of Bibi Jawindi and the tomb and mosque of Jalaluddin Bukhari have been on the "tentative" list of UNESCO World Heritage Sites since 2004. World Monuments Fund also promotes its conservation.

== Ancestors and descendants ==
Bukhari's biography and family history are cited extensively in such works as Gulzar-e-Mustafavi, Hilal-e-Mustafavi, Marat-e-Jalali, the Aal-e-Zahra s.a, the Rauzat-ul-Ahbab, the Gulzar-e-Jalaliya, Maraij-ul-Walayat, Manaqabi Qutbi, the Siyar-ul-Aqtar, the Aal-e-Ameer and Aal-e-Nafees: Complete Genealogical Archive of Naqvi Bukhari Sadat Lineage, the Family of Saadat Naqvi, th, the Mazher-i-Jalali, the Akber-ul-Akhyar, the Rauzat-ul-Ahbab, Maraij-ul-Walayat, Manaqabi Qutbi, the Siyar-ul-Aqtar, the Siyar-ul-Arifeen and the Manaqib-ul-Asifya. These manuscripts are held by Bukhari Sayyids, however the work Marat-e-Jalali was published (by Asrar Karami Press) in 1918 into a book form from Allahabad, India (eBook) and its second edition with updates and more research material was printed (by V I Printers) as a book in 1999 from Karachi, Pakistan. His descendants are called Naqvi al-Bukhari. However, this book is heavily critiqued due to having names and family trees mixed up. Furthermore, the author a police officer claimed Bukhari lineage but did not know his own bloodline which he claimed to be of Bukhari lineage.

Sikandar Lodi's advisor Syed Sadarudin Shah Kabir Naqvi Al Bukhari descendant through Sayyid Sadruddin Rajan Qatal a grandson of Jalaluddin Surkh Posh. This mosque has an aesthetic blend of architectural styles. There are a number of tombs of Bukhari descendants across Punjab, Sindh, Indian Gujarat, Khyber Pakhtunkhwa and Uttar Pradesh in India. They include: Jahaniyan Jahangasht (d. 1308 CE). Meeran Muhammad Shah aka Mauj Darya Bukhari in Lahore and Rajan Qittal, Bibi Jawindi (c. 1492 CE), Bukhari's great-granddaughter and, Dera Ghazi Khan and Channan Pir and Jabbi Sayyedan, Farward Kahuta, AJK and Wadpagga Sharif in Peshawar. Some descendants of Jahaniyan Jahangasht moved to Kamalia and Sandhilianwali side then to Depalpur tehsil Dhole to convert 37 sub tribes to Islam and then Firozpur During the 1850s they migrated to Sri Mukstar Sahib region of Ferozpur regions of Kabbarwala, Fattanwala (Shrine of Syed Wazeer Ali Shah bin Ameer Ali Shah Naqvi Al Bukhari is well known in the area), Bharpoora, Sodheke (Depalpur Tehsil) Bahmaniwala (Ferozpur) with other regions with other branches of Naqvi Bukhari such as Hunjrawan Kalan (Hunjarawawala, Haryana, near Fatehabad) the Jamia Shahi Masjid also has a library placed by this family, Talwara Jheel (Rajasthan near Hanumangarh), and Fazilka India. They then migrated back into the present-day Pakistan area mainly resettling in Dipalpur tehsil and abroad but initially travelled outwards from the headquarters of Uch. Descendants of this family travelled across vast lands from Delhi, Bukhara and Mecca. Great Grandson of Hz. Jahaniya Jahangasht Qazi Husamuddin Hasan Bukhari in Allahabad (Old Kara Manikpur) in Uttar Pradesh India and his descendants are found in Chail and known as Naqvi Bukhari Syeds.

The tomb of Bibi Jawindi and the tomb and mosque of Jalaluddin Bukhari have been on the "tentative" list of UNESCO World Heritage Sites since 2004. World Monuments Fund also promotes its conservation. He also had a son called Syed Ahmad Kabir who moved to Makkah. Kabir's sister, Syeda Haseenah Fatimah, was the mother of Shah Jalal.

=== Family lineage ===
According to family tree (between pages 40 and 41) of Mara'at Jalali (2nd Ed. 1999), Gulzar e Mustafvi / Hilal-e-Mustafavi first edition and Fakhr E Sadat (authored by Syed Karam Ali Shah Bukhari Dholvi) and Malfuzul Makhdoom Bukhari's lineage is:

- Jalaluddin Surkh-Posh Bukhari
- Syed Ali Al Moeed
- Syed Ja'far Muhammad Al Ameer
- Syed Muhammad Abu Al Fateh
- Syed Mehmood (emigrated to Bukhara)
- Syed Ahmed / Muhammad (Naqeeb Al Ashraf), also the common ancestor of Nizamuddin Auliya as his lineage is from the other son of Syed Ahmed named Syed Ali. It is agreed that all continuing lineage descendants of his father Syed Abdullah Al Nazuk are through him and no other lines exist except that they are falsified.
- Syed Abdullah Al Nazuk
- Syed Ali Al Asghar Al Nazuk (Naqeeb Al Ashraf)
- Ja'far ibn Ali al-Hadi Samarra also the common ancestor of Sayyid Muhammad al-Makki through Syed Ismail Harifa bin Imam Ali al-Hadi, and the Al Qasimi royals who are the Sheikhs of Sharjah UAE are from Syed Idris bin Ja'far bin Imam Ali al-Hadi.
- Ali al-Hadi (Imam was forced to move from Medina around 848 CE to Samarra by the Abbasid caliph al-Mutawakkil)
- Muhammad al-Jawad
- Ali al-Ridha
- Musa al-Kadhim
- Ja'far al-Sadiq
- Muhammad al-Baqir
- Ali ibn Husayn Zayn al-Abidin
- Husayn ibn Ali
- Ali ibn Abi-Talib

== Death ==
In 1244 CE (about 640AH), Bukhari moved to Uch, South Punjab (also known as Uch Sharif after the saint settled there) with his son, Baha-ul-Halim, where he founded a religious school. He died in 1290 CE and was buried in a small town near Uch.

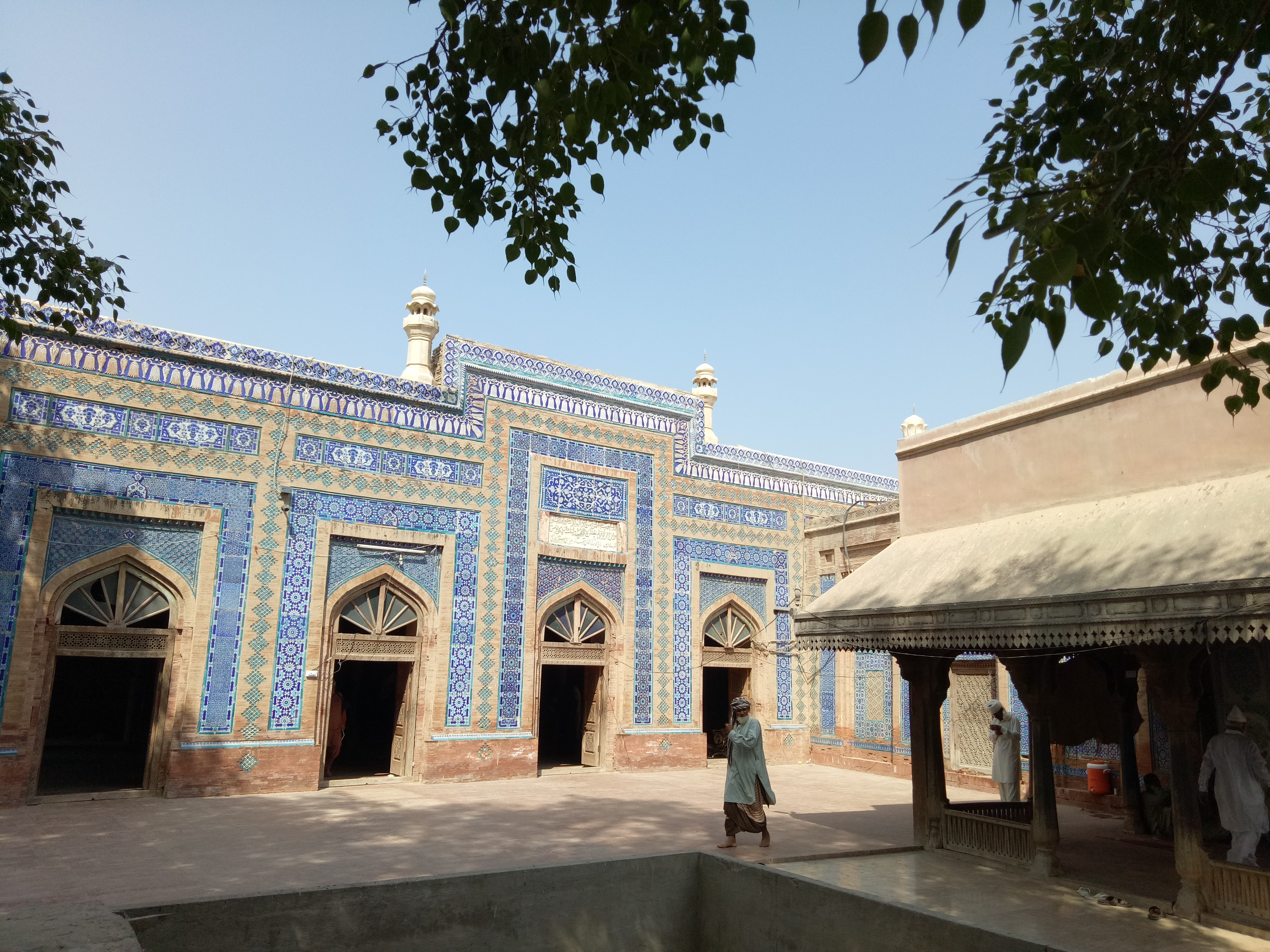
Mosque (left) and entrance to the tomb/shrine of Jalaluddin Bukhari (right) in Uch

The tomb is a short way from the cemetery of Uch. It stands on a promontory overlooking the plains and the desert beyond. To one side of the tomb is a mosque decorated with blue tilework. In front of the tomb is a pool. A carved wooden door leads into the room containing Bukhari's coffin. UNESCO describes the site:

The brick-built tomb measures 18 meters by 24 meters and its carved wooden pillars support a flat roof and it is decorated with glazed tiles in floral and geometric designs. The ceiling is painted with floral designs in lacquer and its floor is covered with the graves of the saint and his relatives an interior partition provides 'purdah' for those of his womenfolk. Its mosque consists of a hall, measuring 20 meters by 11 meters, with 18 wooden pillars supporting a flat roof. It was built of cut and dressed bricks and further decorated, internally and externally, with enamelled tiles in floral and geometric designs.

== See also ==
- List of mausolea and shrines in Pakistan
- Bukhari
