= Sayido Nasafi =

17th-century Tajik poet of Bukhara

- میرعابد سیدای نسفی
- Born: Mirobid; 17th century (uncertain); Nasaf, Khanate of Bukhara (present-day Qarshi, Uzbekistan)
- Died: between 1707 and 1711; Bukhara, Khanate of Bukhara
- Occupations: Poet; weaver
- Writing career
- Language: Tajik
- Period: 17th–early 18th century
- Genres: Ghazal; Mukhammas; Qasida; Masnavi; shahrashub; Allegory
- Notable works: Shahrashub; Bahoriyat; Saqi-nama
- Movement: Tajik literature

Mirobid Sayido Nasafi (Persian: میرعابد سیدای نسفی; Tajik: Миробид Сайидои Насафӣ; died between 1707 and 1711) was a Tajik poet in the Khanate of Bukhara. He was born in Nasaf (now Qarshi, Uzbekistan) and lived mostly in Bukhara, where he studied and worked as a weaver. His poems are about craftspeople and city life, criticize the powerful, and use everyday speech within the forms of classical Persian verse.

Sayido wrote ghazals, mukhammases, qasidas and narrative verse. His best-known works are Shahrashub, a group of poems about the people and trades of a city, and Bahoriyat (Springtime), an allegory in which animals argue about which of them is best.

== Life ==
=== Origins and education ===
Little is known about Sayido's early life. Mirobid was his given name. Sayido (or Sayyida) was his pen name, and Nasafi refers to Nasaf, a historic city in Transoxiana. He was born there and moved to Bukhara when he was young.

The year of his birth is not known. Some sources give 1618, which is the basis for the 400th-anniversary events held in 2018. One study gives 1637.

In Bukhara he studied at the Nadir Divan-Begi Madrasah. His family was connected to weaving, and he earned his living by manual work. No full biography from his own time exists, so details of his life are taken from references in his poems. He knew many artisans, and they appear often in his writing.

=== Patronage and later years ===
Sayido lived under the Janid (Ashtarkhanid) dynasty. Like other poets of the time, he wrote praise poems for rulers, including Abdulaziz Khan and Subhan Quli Khan. His relationship with the court was uneasy. He later criticized powerful men for hypocrisy and for ignoring the hardships of ordinary people.

Conditions in Bukhara got worse under Subhan Quli Khan (r. 1681–1702), with political conflict and economic hardship. Several poets and scholars went to Mughal India to find patrons. Sayido thought about going too but stayed in Bukhara. Scholars attribute this to his age and his attachment to the city. Near the end of his life he wrote a rare praise poem for Ubaydullah Khan, who ruled from 1702 to 1711. Sources generally place his death between 1707 and 1711, and he died in Bukhara.

=== Early sources ===
Two early works mention Sayido: Mudhakkir al-ashab, a biographical collection by Maleho Samarqandi, and Ubaydullah-nama by Muhammad Amin Bukhari. Neither gives a detailed account of his life, so his own poems are the main source for his circumstances.

== Poetry ==
=== Language and style ===
Sayido wrote in the established forms of Persian poetry, mainly the ghazal and the mukhammas. His imagery and unexpected comparisons were influenced by the "Indian style" (sabk-e hindi), especially the work of Saib Tabrizi. He used these methods for subjects other than courtship and court praise, such as the hardships of scholars, poverty, and the daily work of townspeople.

He also used expressions from everyday speech and the terms of particular crafts, not only the learned vocabulary of literary Persian. Literary historians regard this as an innovation.

=== Ghazals and other forms ===
Ghazals make up most of Sayido's surviving poetry. His Kulliyat (collected works) contains about 550 ghazals with around 4,600 couplets, which is more than half of the collection. They use conventional meters, rhymes and images, but often put social experience next to romantic longing. He also wrote mukhammas poems, which have five-line stanzas, some of them built on ghazals by other poets, as well as qasidas and narrative pieces.

=== Shahrashub ===
Shahrashub is a Persian genre of poems about a city's people, sights and occupations. Earlier poets, including Sayfi Bukhari, had written verse about artisans. Sayido wrote about them at greater length and put the tools, speech and social relations of the marketplace into poetry that had mostly been addressed to rulers and patrons.

The poems cover trades such as baking, painting, barbering, metalwork and music, and they use humor and wordplay. A poem about a barber uses words for blades and hair to describe the lover's power. The size of the work depends on the edition and how it is counted. Hitchins gives about 405 couplets covering 212 crafts. A study based on the 1990 critical edition reports 410 couplets and 227 occupations or personal characteristics.

=== Bahoriyat ===
Bahoriyat (Persian: بهاریات; Springtime), also called the Book of Animals, is an allegorical narrative. Hitchins dates its completion to about 1679 and gives its length as 184 couplets. In the poem, a series of animals, from a mouse to a lion, boast of their strengths and belittle one another. An ant then rebukes them for their pride, and they feel regret and are reconciled. Scholars read the poem as being about work, solidarity and humility, and as a comment on the social hierarchy of Bukhara.

=== The city and the visual arts ===
Sayido's saqi-nama (Book of the Cupbearer) describes a walk through Bukhara. Paul E. Losensky writes that it begins at the shrine of Baha' al-Din Naqshband and ends near the throne room of Subhan Quli Khan.

The art historian Francis Richard has pointed to Sayido's detailed references to books, calligraphy, painting and architectural decoration. One long passage in his poems praises a painter named Khwaja Shafi Naqqash. Richard argues that these passages show Sayido knew the visual culture of seventeenth-century Bukhara and its artistic circles.

== Manuscripts and editions ==
Hitchins lists eleven manuscript copies of Sayido's collected works in libraries in Dushanbe, Tashkent, Bukhara and Saint Petersburg. The whole corpus has been estimated at about 8,500 couplets, though the figure varies with editorial decisions.

Sadriddin Ayni included selections in his 1926 anthology of Tajik literature. The literary scholar Abdulghani Mirzoev later prepared editions and studies of the poet. Collected editions have appeared in Dushanbe and Tehran, including a critical text by Jobulqo Dodalishoev around 1990 and a Persian-language Divan edited by Hasan Rahbari in 2003.

== Legacy ==
Tajikistan held commemorations in 2018 for the 400th anniversary of his traditionally assigned birth year, including an international symposium. A monument to Sayido stands at the Magtymguly Pyragy cultural and park complex in Ashgabat, Turkmenistan.
