= Mohammad Ibrahim Zauq =

Poet laureate of the Mughal Court in Delhi (1790–1854)

Muhammad Ibrahim Zauq
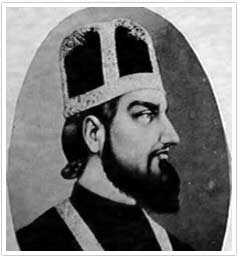
- Born: August 1, 1789; Delhi
- Died: November 1, 1854 at age 64; Delhi, Mughal Empire
- Occupation: Poet
- Writing career
- Pen name: Zauq
- Period: 1837–1857
- Genres: Ghazal, qasida, mukhammas
- Subject: Love

Sheikh Muhammad Ibrahim Zauq (1789 – November 1854) was an Urdu poet and scholar of literature, poetry and religion. He wrote poetry under the pen name "Zauq", and was appointed poet laureate of the Mughal Court in Delhi at the age of just 19. Later he was given the title of Khaqani-e-Hind (The Khaqani of India) by the last Mughal emperor Bahadur Shah Zafar who was also his disciple in poetry.

He was poor as a young person, with only an ordinary education. He went on to acquire learning in history, theology and poetry in his later years. Zauq was a prominent contemporary of Ghalib and in the history of Urdu poetry, the rivalry of the two poets is quite well known. During his lifetime, Zauq was more popular than Ghalib for the critical values in those days were mainly confined to judging a piece of poetry on the basis of usage of words, phrases and idioms. Content and style were not much taken into account while appreciating poetry.

== Early life ==
Zauq was born in Delhi in 1789 into a Hindu Punjabi Khatri family to Sheikh Muhammad Ramzan who was a common soldier in the Mughal army..

It was no less than a miracle that Zauq, without having the proper treatment on account of the extreme poverty of his family, survived the attack of a disease like smallpox during his childhood.

His father had no means to equip his son with the best available education of the time. He was sent to a maktab (elementary religious school), run by Hafiz Ghulam Rasool. Hafiz himself was a poet and used Shauq as his pen name. Under his influence, the young Ibrahim also got attracted towards poetry. Hafiz provided the required encouragement, took him as his pupil in poetry and suggested Zauq as his pen name.

Though Zauq could not complete the course of the maktab, he got hooked on poetry. In those days Shah Naseer was the most famous master poet of Delhi. Zauq began showing his ghazals to Shah Naseer for improvement. Naseer recognised the natural talent and made him his pupil. Gradually, Zauq began participating in the mushairas. His natural bent of mind towards poetry coupled with his singular obsession to excel in the pursuit brought him fame and fortune. He would be better appreciated in the mushairas than his mentor. Shah Naseer got very annoyed with the growing popularity of Zauq. He threw him out of the group of his pupils. Zauq, thereafter, relied only on his talent and continued writing poetry with a vengeance.

Another poet, Meer Kazim Hussain Beqarar, a friend of Zauq's was appointed the mentor of the Crown Prince Zafar, who later ascended the throne. Through him, Zauq could get the chance to enter the royal court. He also started participating in the royal mushairas. When Beqarar took up the job of Meer Munshi (Head Clerk) in the Office of John Elphinstone, Crown Prince Zafar appointed Zauq as his mentor with a monthly salary of Rs. 4 that was ultimately raised to Rs. 100 when Bahadur Shah Zafar ascended the throne. He remained the poet laureate of the Mughal Court till his death in 1854.

== Career ==
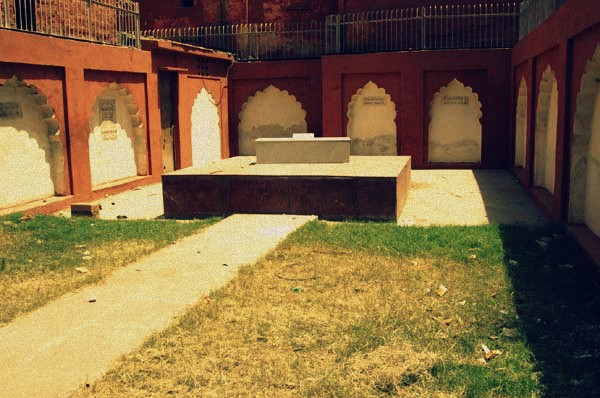
Mazaar of Sheikh Mohammad Ibrahim Zauq in Paharganj, Delhi

Zauq's reputation in Urdu poetry is because of his eulogies that reflect his command over the language and his expertise in composing poetry in extremely difficult meters. Since he got associated with the royal court right from his teens and remained there till his death, he had to write mostly eulogies to seek the patronage and rewards from the princes and the King. His mentor, Shah Naseer, would also pay attention only to the linguistic eloquence and mastery over prosody. Zauq also emulated the example of his mentor. Such style of poetry suits eulogy writing. Many critics regard him a great eulogy writer next only to Sauda.

His ghazals also have some literary value. Since Bahadur Shah Zafar was fond of using simple and colloquial diction, Zauq too composed his ghazals using simple words, phrases of everyday use and similes rooted in the common culture. His ghazals are also notable for their spontaneity. Zauq was a deeply religious man. In his ghazals too, he would deal with religious and ethical themes. Therefore, his ghazals lack lyricism and appear to be the verses of a preacher.

== Death ==
Zauq died in 1854 at age 64, and today his grave lies in the grounds of Zakir Husain Delhi College, now part of Delhi University outside Ajmeri Gate in Paharganj, Delhi. His grave was restored after the Supreme Court of India orders in the early 2000s, but his home in nearby Nabi Karim area, was never identified.

== Legacy ==
Major portion of Zauq's poetical output got lost because of mutiny of 1857. Maulana Muhammad Husain Azad compiled a slim volume of his poetry with the help of his pupils like Hafiz, Veeran, Anwar and Zaheer that contains twelve hundred couplets of Ghazals and fifteen Eulogies. Even though much of his work was lost, he left behind a legacy of ghazal, qasida, and mukhammas.

== Genre ==
The qasida was his special forte. Zauq's idioms were homely, but no one has a greater number of signal phrases memorable for thought or music. His language was polished and his diction elegant. He used several styles successfully and, though not as great a thinker as Mirza Ghalib, had a more melodious flow of language. Zauq never tried to become like Ghalib, and had a different image.

== In popular culture ==
- In literature
  - Zauq is frequently mentioned in poetries of Ghalib. His rivalry is mentioned in Deewan-e-ghalib.
  - A poem titled 'Zauq' by poet-diplomat Abhay K tries to tell Zauq's side of story vis a vis his arch-rival Ghalib.
- In Television
  - Zauq is played by Shafi Inamdar in the Television series Mirza Ghalib Directed by Gulzar.
