= Pir Haji Ali Shah Bukhari =

Uzbek Islamic scholar and mystic (14-15 Century)

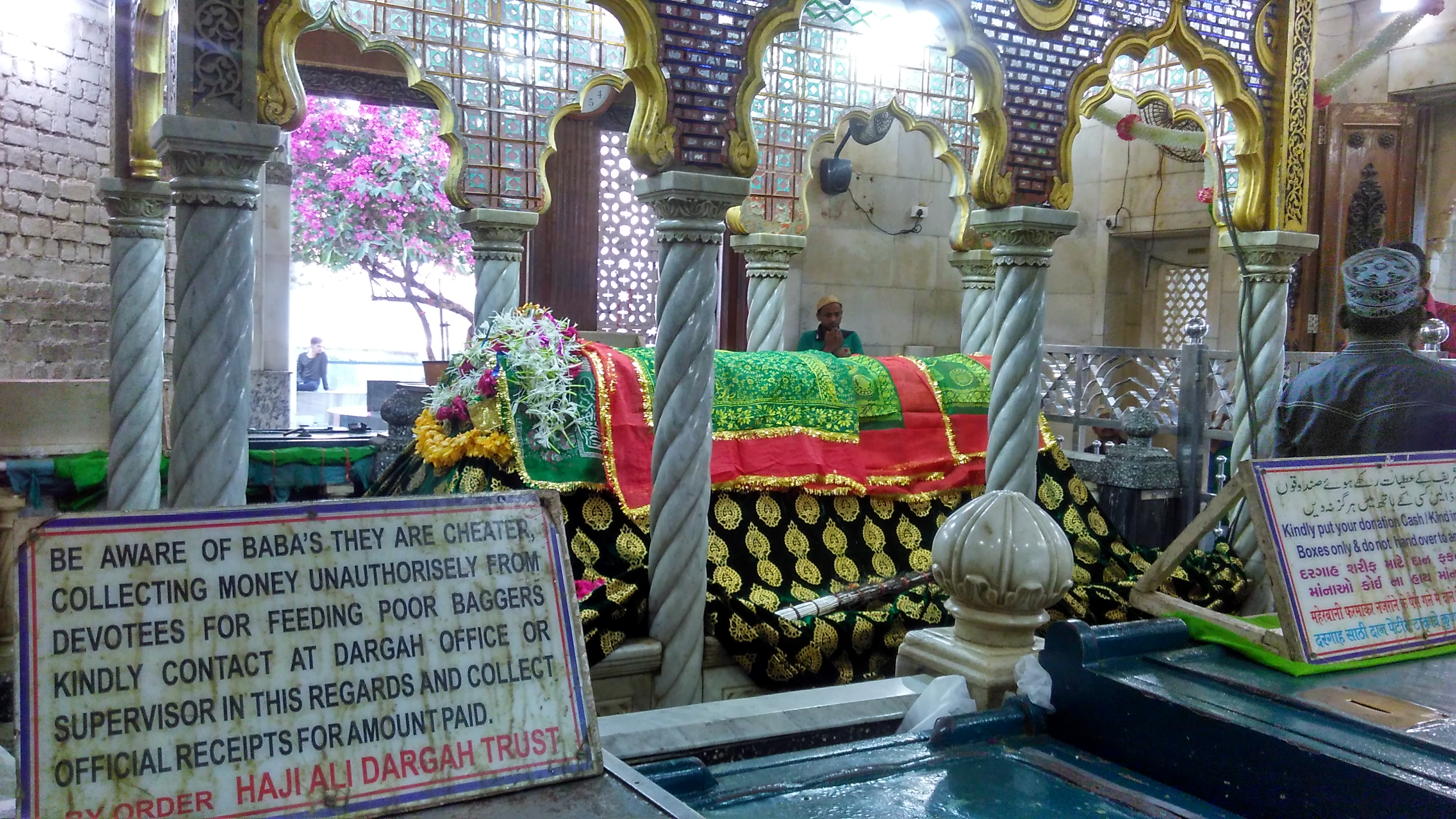
- Pir Haji Ali Shah Bukhari's Shrine at Haji Ali Dargah
- Born: 14th Century; Uzbekistan
- Died: 15th Century; Mumbai gujrat sultanate
- Major shrine: Haji Ali Dargah, Worli, Mumbai, Maharashtra
- Patronage: Maharashtra, India
- Tradition or genre: Sufi Saint

Pir Haji Ali Shah Bukhari or Pir Haji Ali was a Kubrawiyya, a Hajji, born to a wealthy merchant family from Uzbekistan. His shrine in Haji Ali Dargah is situated in India's largest city Mumbai.

== History ==
Peer Syed Haji Ali Shah Bukhari was a wealthy merchant. Haji Ali Shah came from Samarqand with Mir Sayyid Ali Hamadani. He was a disciple of Ali Hamadani, At some point during the Delhi Sultanate rule over the island of Worli, Peer Sayyed Haji Ali came to settle there. Many legends point out that during his journey to Mecca, he fell ill and died, and on his request, his followers cast his body into the sea. Earlier in his life, the Peer has helped a poor woman recover some oil by jabbing a finger into the earth. This act later filled him with remorse, so much that he did not want to injure the earth more. The casket carrying his coffin floated back to the shores near Worli. Today, a humble yet eye-catching tomb stands at this spot amongst the rocks, some 500 meters into the sea. The saint gave up all his wealth and material possessions to make a pilgrimage to Mecca. Then, after traveling around the world, he settled in one of the islands that today make up the city of Mumbai and dedicated his life to spread Islam in the area.

He had no children of his own so has no direct descendants.

== See also ==
- Haji Ali Dargah
- Qawwali at Haji Ali dargah
