= Roziya Ozod =

- Born: 18 January 1893; Khujand, Russian Turkestan, Russian Empire
- Died: 1957 (aged 63–64); Leninabad, Tajik SSR, USSR
- Occupation: Poet
- Children: Bobojon Ghafurov

Roziya Boimatovna Ghafurova, better known as Roziya Ozod (18 January 1893 – 1957), was a Tajikistani poet of the Soviet era.

== Early life and career ==
Ozod was born in Khujand into the family of a merchant, and received her early education in the traditional schools before embarking on a career as a teacher. According to her own account of her biography as told through her poetry, she spent the entirety of her early life within the confines of Khujand, first in her family home and later in the house of her husband; she never even saw the outskirts of the city. It was only with the Russian Revolution that she first felt truly free, which was the reason she chose "Ozod" as her takhallus.

She began writing poetry during World War II, composing patriotic works in which she urged warriors to continue fighting. She continued writing after the war; notable works include Qahramoni Odil (Just Champion, 1943), Mahabbat ba Vatan (Love for the Country, 1944), Gulistoni 'Ishq (The Rose Garden of Love, 1946), Az Vodihoi Taloi (From the Golden Valleys, 1948), Iqbol (Fortune, 1951), and Zindabod Sulh (Long Live Peace, 1954). The theme of many of these later poems is the lot of women, especially in the time before the Revolution. Other work is dedicated to children. In 1944, Ozod joined the Union of Writers of Tajikistan. A collected volume of poetry, Ash'ori muntakhab (Selected Poems), appeared posthumously in 1959.

== Personal life ==
She was the mother of scholar Bobojon Ghafurov.

== Death ==
She died in Khujand.
