= Hakim Karim =

Tajik writer

Hakim Karim (1905–1942) was a Tajik Soviet writer. He was born in Khujand and was educated in a Russian school. He lived in Aktyubinsk for a while, before moving to the capital Dushanbe in 1925 to head the agitprop department of the Tajik Komsomol. In 1926, he became a member of the Communist Party. He worked in Karatag and Kuliab in the south of the country, and served as a politruk in the Soviet authorities' battle against Basmachi rebels. He lived for a while in Moscow, and worked as an editor of the Tajik-language party organ Proletari Khujandi.

Returning to Dushanbe, he lived in a Writers' Union housing block, where the writer Jalol Ikrami was his neighbour. Karim and his wife Bonukhon were arrested and imprisoned as part of Stalin's purges, but they were later released in 1938. While they were in prison, their eldest son died in an orphanage, prompting the return of the bereaved parents to Khujand (then known as Leninobod). When the Second World War began, Karim joined the army. He is thought to have died in the battle for Staraya Russa.

Also known as Karim-zoda, Hakim Karim was principally a prose writer, best known for his novels, short stories and plays. His most significant work is a play called 1916, portraying the Tajik uprising against the Tsarist empire.
