= Mukhammas =

Mukhammas (Arabic: مخمس, romanized: muḵammas, lit. 'five-fold', plural: male: مخمسون, romanized: muḵammasūn, female: مخمسات, romanized: muḵammasāt) refers to a type of Persian or Urdu cinquain or quintain/pentastich with Sufi connections based on a pentameter. It has five lines in each paragraph.

It is one of the more popular verse forms in Tajik Badakhshan, occurring in both madoh and other performance genres.

== Details of the form ==
The mukhammas represents a stanza of two distichs and a hemistich in monorhyme, the fifth line being the "bob" or burden: each succeeding stanza affects a new rhyme, except in the fifth line, e.g., a rhyme scheme of AAAAB CCCCB DDDDB and so forth.

Every stanza of a mukhammas includes five lines.

- In the first stanza, all five lines rhyme.
- In the later stanzas, the first four lines rhyme, but the fifth line breaks the rhyme. It can be repeated, or else its rhyme can be that of the first stanza.

== Themes ==
A recurrent theme of the mukhammas is praise of Imam Ali and his companions, but other themes also occur.

== Poets ==
Many Urdu poets have contributed to the mukhammas. The important among them include:

- Mirza Ghalib
- Bahadur Shah Zafar
- Wali Mohammed Wali
- Zauq

Poets who have written the mukhammas in other languages include:

- Sipandi Samarkandi
- Qatran Tabrizi

== See also ==
- Doha
- Chhand
- Musaddas
- Misra'
- Marsiya
- Masnavi
- Rekhta
