= Tajik literature =

Monument in Dushanbe to Tajik writers

Tajik literature and its history are bound up with the standardisation of the Tajik language. Tajik literary centres include the cities of Bukhara and Samarkand, currently in present-day Uzbekistan but with a majority Tajik population and Balkh and Herat in Afghanistan.

During the Soviet era, the principal literary output was socialist realism in nature.

Three writers dominated the first generation of Soviet Tajik literature. Sadriddin Ayni (1878–1954), a Jadidist writer and educator who turned communist, began as a poet but wrote primarily prose in the Soviet era. His works include three major novels dealing with social issues in the region and memoirs that depict life in the Bukhara Khanate. Aini became the first president of Tajikistan's Academy of Sciences.

Abu'l-Qasem Lahuti (1887–1957; in Tajik, Abdulqosim Lohuti) was an Iranian poet who immigrated to the Soviet Union for political reasons and eventually settled in Tajikistan. He wrote both lyric poetry and "socialist realist" verse. Another poet, Mirzo Tursunzoda (1911–1977), collected Tajik oral literature, wrote poetry of his own about social change in Tajikistan, and turned out various works on popular political themes of the moment. Since the generation that included those three writers, Tajikistan has produced numerous poets, novelists, short story writers, and playwrights.

Other writers of note during the Soviet period include Sotim Ulughzoda (1911–1997), Karim Hakim (1905–1942), Payrav Sulaymoni (1899–1933), Rozia Ozod (1893–1957), Aminjon Shukuhi (1923–??), Mohammadjon Rahimi (1901–??), Bobo Yunas (1885–1945), Habibullo Nazarov (1907–??), Abdul Salem Dehati (1911–??), Boqi Rahimzoda (1910–??), Rahim Jalil (1909–??), Jalol Ikromi (1909–??), Aminzadeh Mohiedin (1904–??), Juhari Zadeh Sohayli (1900–??), Faizollah Ansari (1931–??), Mirzo Ghafar (1929–??), Mir Shakar (1912–??), Mohiadin Farhat (1924–??) and Ahmad-i Donish.

== Notable writers ==
- Sadriddin Ayni
- Mirzā Abdulvāhid Munzim
- Abulqāsim Lāhutī
- Sadr-i Ziyo
- Sotim Ulughzoda
- Mirzo Tursunzoda
- Loiq Sherali
- Bozor Sobir
- Muhammadjon Shukurov
- Sattār Tursun
- Bobojon Ghafurov

== See also ==
- Persian literature
- Mercy-Man
