= Haji Ali Dargah =

Dargah and mosque near Mumbai, Maharashtra, India

- हाजी अली दरगाह
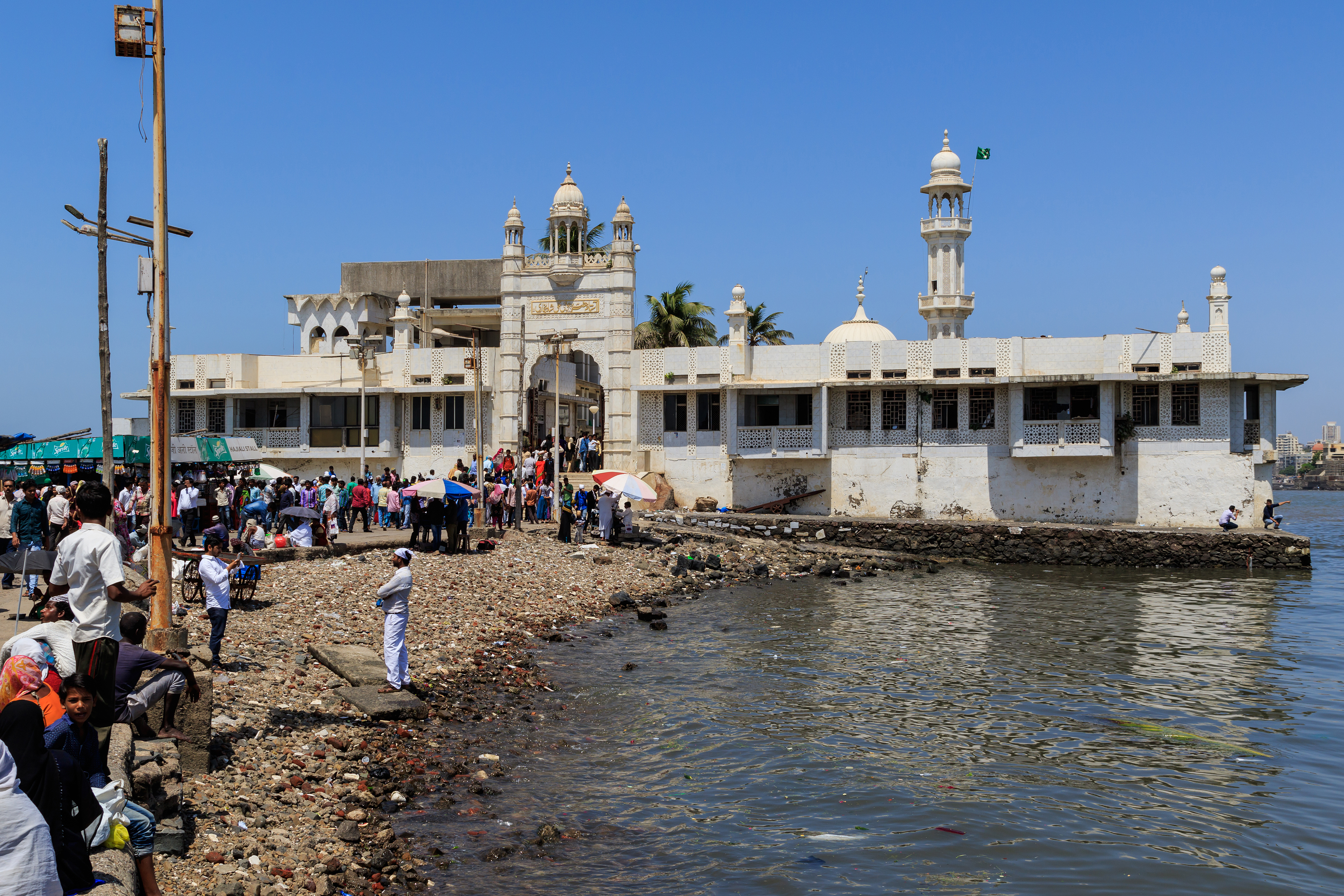
- The shrine of Haji Ali Shah Bukhari, in 2016

- Location of the dargah and mosque on an islet, 500 m (1,600 ft) off the coast from Worli, near Mumbai

Religion
- Affiliation: Sufi Islam
- Ecclesiastical or organisational status: Mosque and dargah
- Ownership: Haji Ali Dargah Trust
- Status: Active shrine

Location
- Location: near Worli, Mumbai City district, Maharashtra
- Country: India
- Coordinates: 18°59′06″N 72°48′36″E

Architecture
- Type: Mosque architecture and Sufi mausoleum
- Style: Indo-Islamic
- Completed: 1431

Specifications
- Direction of façade: West
- Dome: One
- Minaret: One
- Shrine: One

Website
- hajialidargah.in

The Haji Ali Dargah is a Sufi shrine and the monument of Pir Haji Ali Shah Bukhari. It is located on an islet off the coast of Worli in southern Mumbai, in the state of Maharashtra, India.

An example of Indo-Islamic architecture, associated with legends about doomed lovers, the dargah contains the tomb of Haji Ali Shah Bukhari. Bukhari was a Sufi saint and a wealthy merchant from Uzbekistan. Located near the heart of the city, the dargah is one of the most recognisable landmarks of Mumbai.

== Background ==
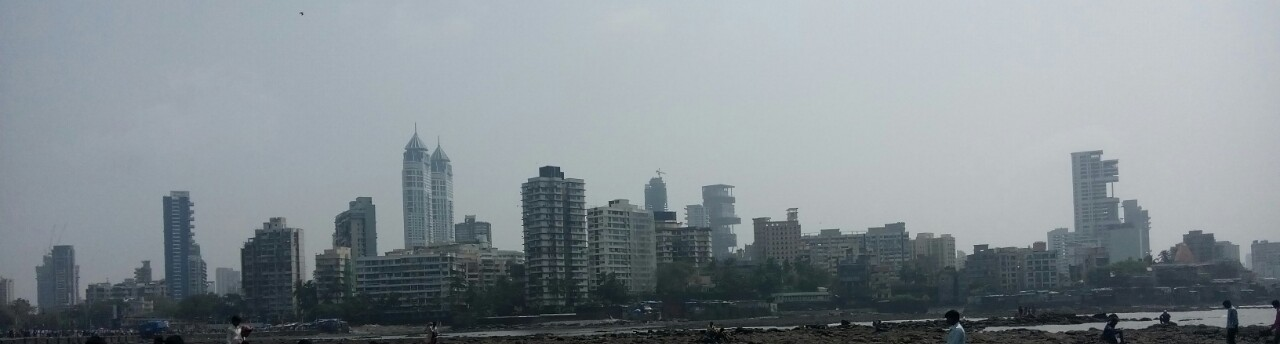
Tardeo as seen from the dargah

The Haji Ali Dargah was constructed in 1431 in memory of a wealthy Muslim merchant, Sayyed Pir Haji Ali Shah Bukhari, a member of the Chishti Order, who gave up all his worldly possessions before making a pilgrimage to Mecca. Hailing from Bukhara, in present-day Uzbekistan, Bukhari travelled around the world in the early to mid-15th century, and eventually settled in present-day Mumbai.

According to legends surrounding his life, once the saint saw a poor woman crying on the road, holding an empty vessel. He asked her what the problem was, she sobbed that her husband would thrash her as she stumbled and accidentally spilled the oil she was carrying. He asked her to take him to the spot where she spilled the oil. There, he jabbed a finger into the soil and the oil gushed out. The overjoyed woman filled up the vessel and went home.

Later, Pir Haji Ali Shah Bukhari had a recurring and disturbing dream that he had injured the Earth by his act. Full of remorse and grief, from that day he started feeling unwell. Then with the permission of his mother, he traveled to India with his brother and finally reached the shore of Mumbai – near Worli or at some place opposite the present tomb. His brother went back to their native place. Pir Haji Ali Shah Bukhari sent a letter with him to their mother informing her that he was keeping good health and that he had decided to reside at that place permanently for the spread of Islam and that she should forgive him.

Until his death, he kept spreading knowledge about Islam to the people, and his devotees would regularly visit him. Before his death he advised his followers that they should not bury him at any proper place or graveyard and should drop his shroud ('kafan') in the ocean such that it should be buried by the people where it is found.

His wish was obeyed by his followers. That is why the Dargah sharief is built at the very site where his Shroud came to rest in the middle of the sea, where it perched on a small mound of rocks rising above the sea. The tomb and Dargah Sharief were built in the years to come.

== Architecture ==
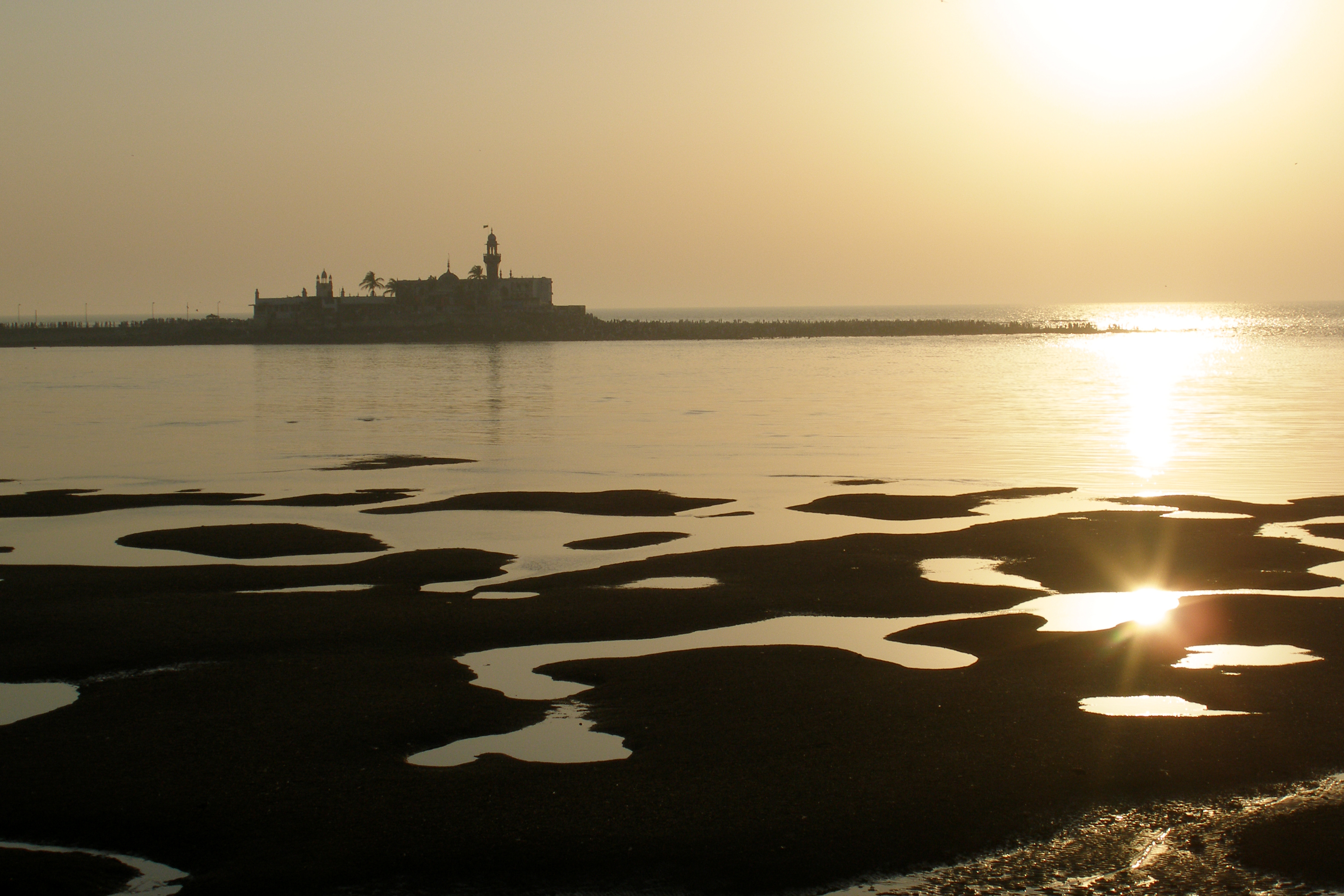
Sunset over the dargah islet and the Arabian Sea

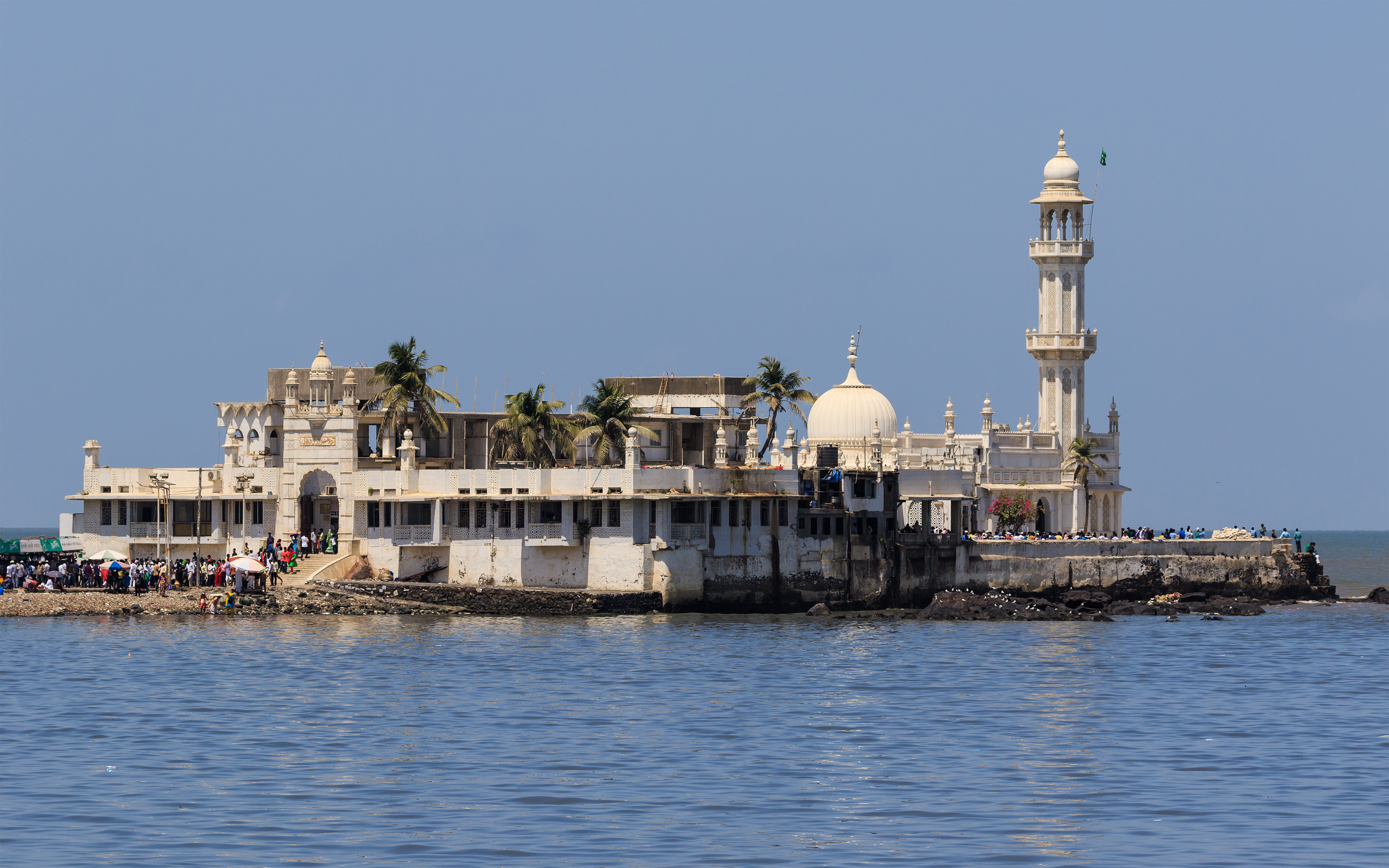
As seen from the Mahalaxmi area

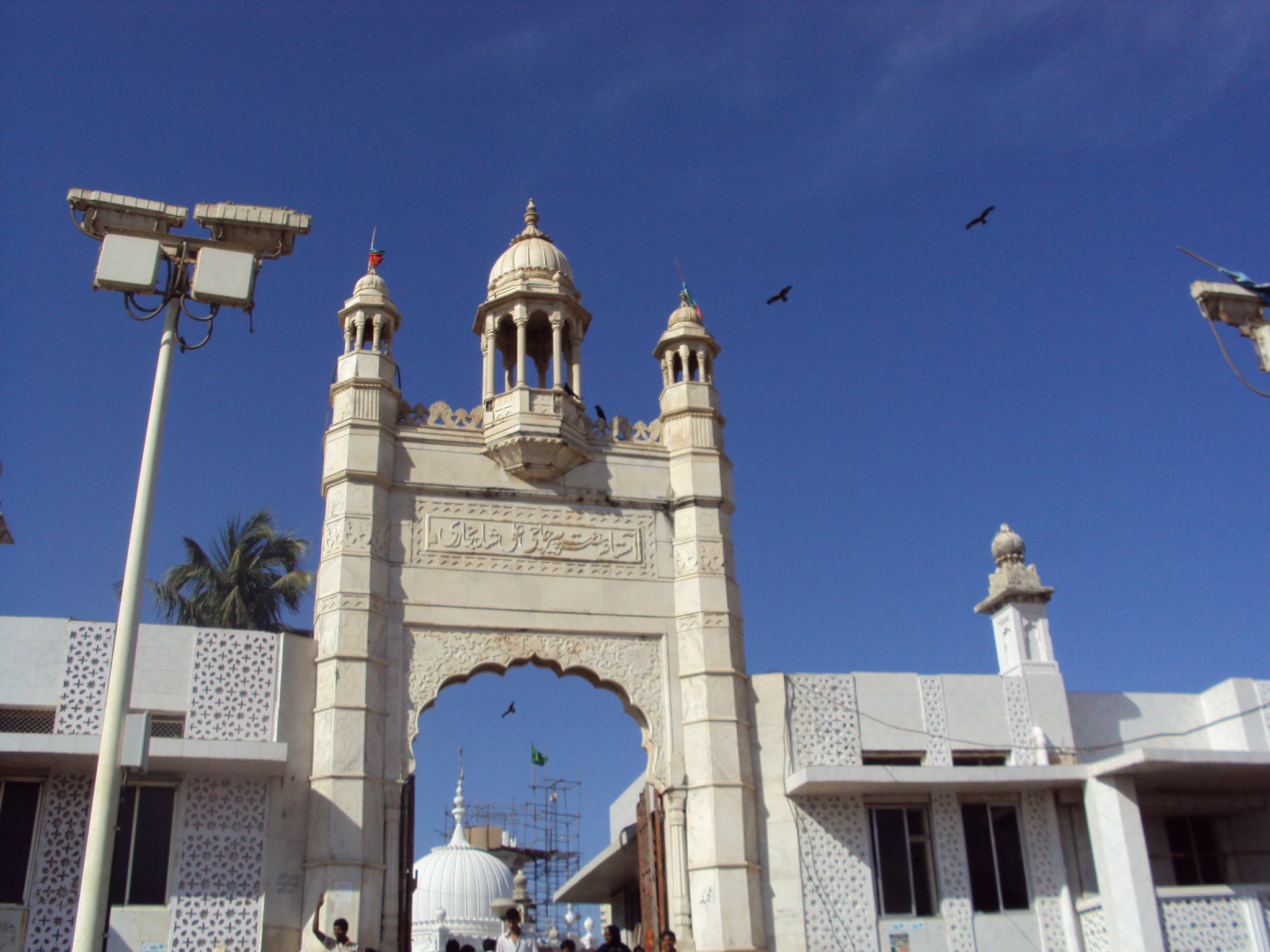
The entrance to the dargah

The dargah is built on a tiny islet located 500 metres (1,600 ft) from the coast, in the Haji Ali Bay, in the vicinity of Worli. The edifice is a brilliant specimen of the Indo-Islamic style of architecture. The islet is linked to the city precinct of Mahalakshmi by a narrow causeway, which is nearly 0.62 miles (1 km) long.

The whitewashed structure occupies an area of a marble courtyard and contains the central shrine. The tomb within the mosque is covered by a brocaded red and green chaddar (tomb cover sheet). It is supported by an exquisite silver frame, Which is supported by marble pillars. The main hall has marble pillars embellished with artistic mirror work: blue, green, yellow chips of glass arranged in kaleidoscopic patterns interspersed with Arabic patterns which spell the ninety-nine names of Allah. As per the Muslim traditions, separate praying rooms for female and male worshippers are provided.

=== Repair and renovation ===
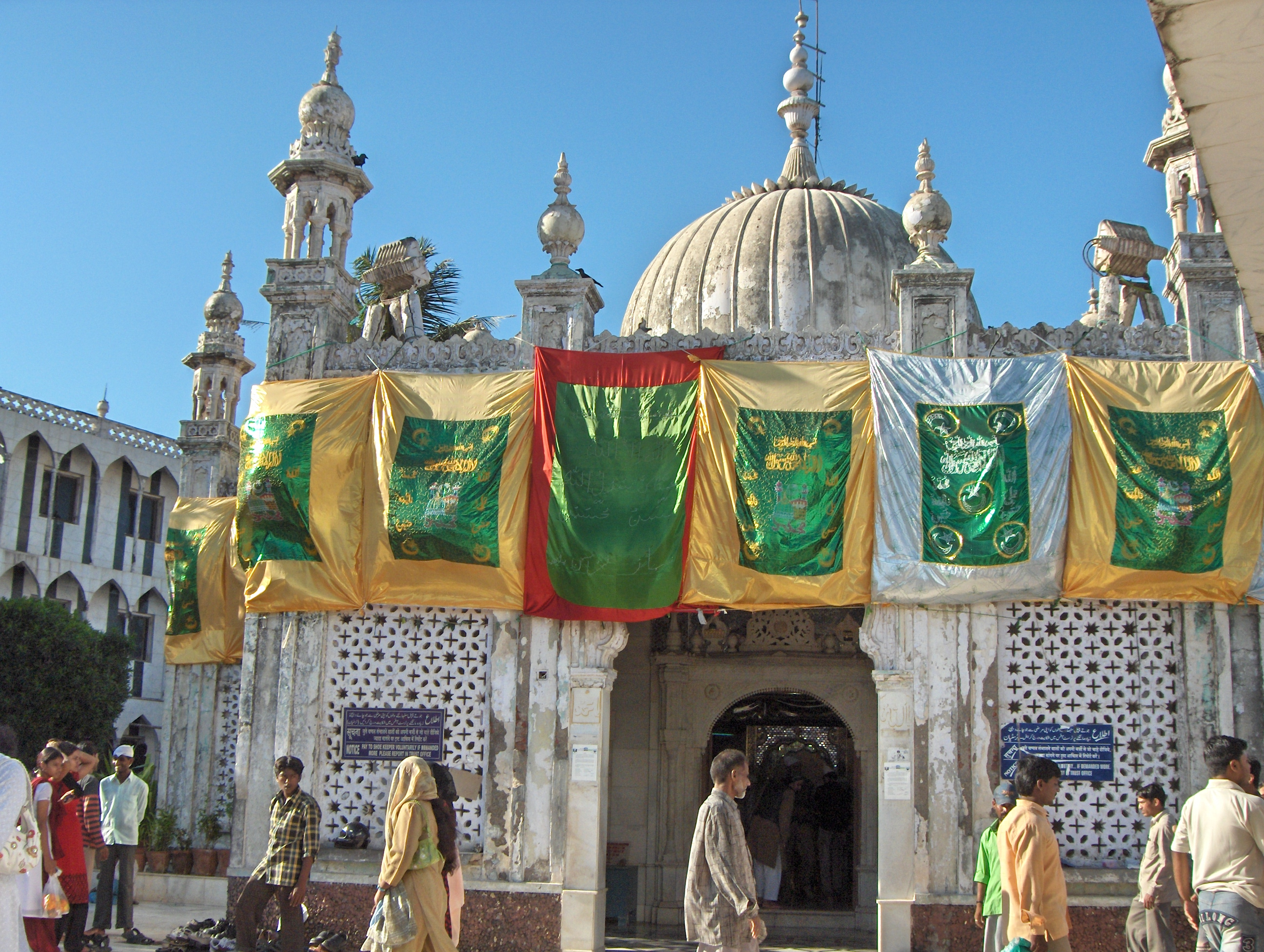
The dargah in 2006

As of 2009, the six-hundred-year-old dargah structure was subject to constant erosion due to saline winds and the impact of c. 80,000 visitors per week. Extensive renovations were completed in 1960 and 1964, and a structural upgrade of the dargah commenced in October 2008. The plans at that time were that the dargah will be beautified with first and second quality white marble, from Makrana, Rajasthan, the same place from where marble for the Taj Mahal was brought. In 2010, it was reported that the repair and structural work was envisaged to take 24 months, over two phases. "Phase One" involved reconstruction of the mosque and minarets; while "Phase Two" involved renovation of the sanitarium building. Upon completion, it was expected that the holy shrine will have the feel of a taj, in Mumbai's brackish sea water.

== Accessibility ==
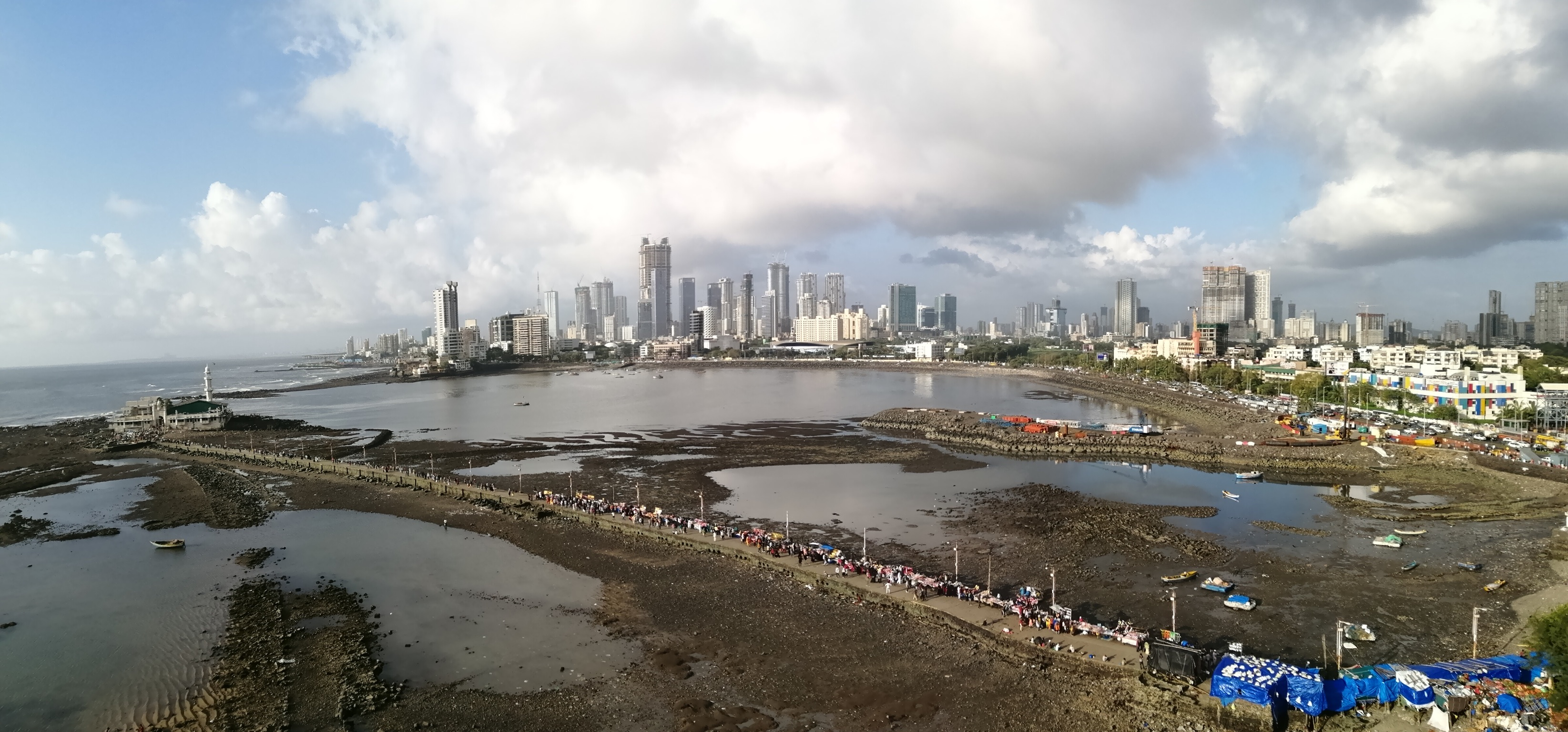
An aerial view of the causeway and dargah during low tide

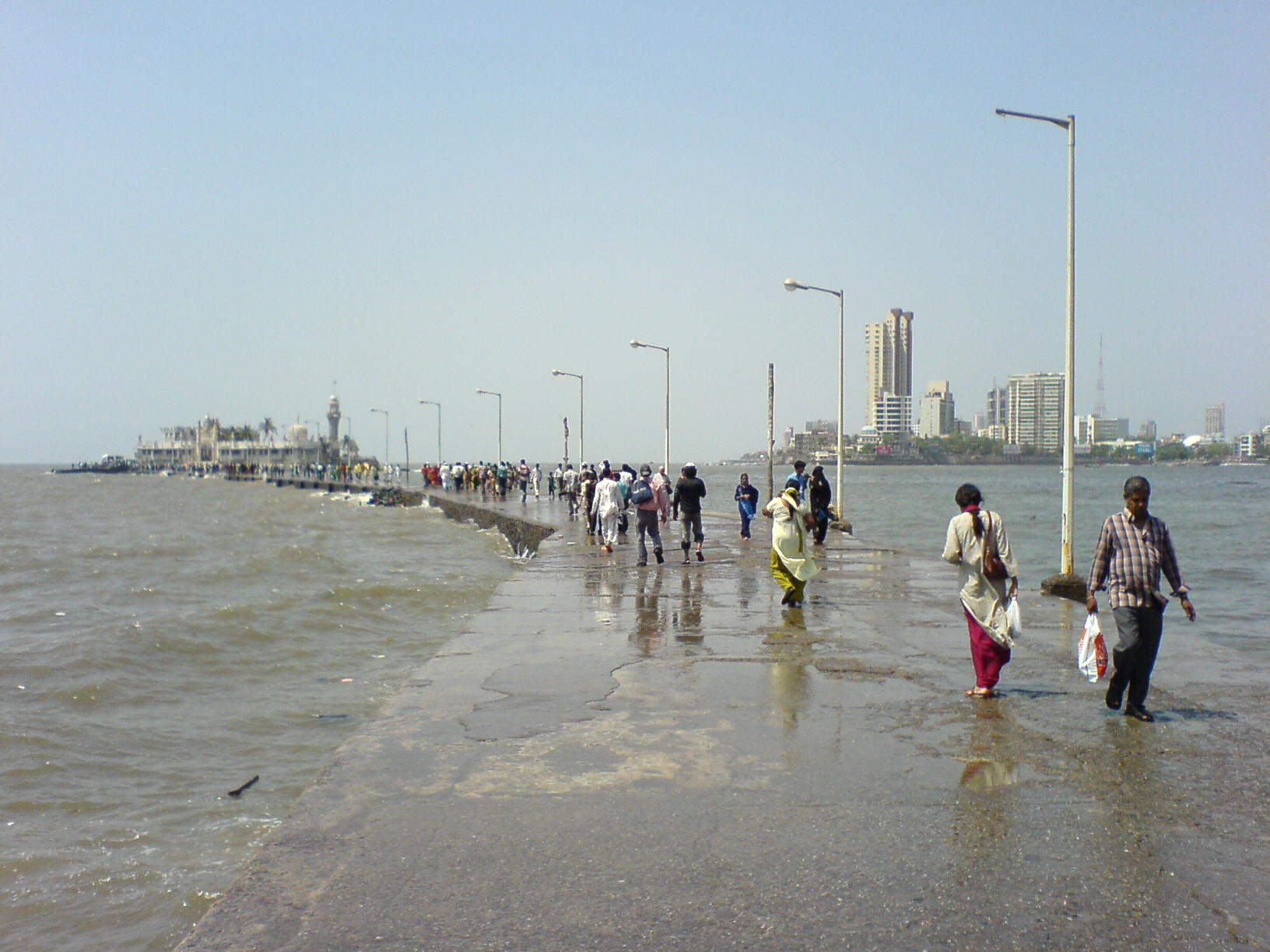
The causeway, close to high tide

The dargah is accessible only during low tide. As the causeway is not bound by railings, when the causeway gets submerged during high tide it becomes inaccessible. During the high tide, the dargah seems completely isolated with no access. The walk on the causeway, with the sea on both sides, is a highlight of a trip to the shrine.

On Thursdays and Fridays, the shrine is a major pilgrimage site. Irrespective of faith or religion, people visit the dargah to receive the blessings of the holy saint. Sometimes, especially on Fridays, various Sufi musicians perform a form of devotional music called Qawwali at the dargah.

The entry point on the mainland's area has pre dominantly non muslim population, nearby buildings there have 90% Gujarati Hindus, residing there.

== 'Haji Ali for all' movement ==
The 'Haji Ali for All' is a feminist movement launched by Bharatiya Muslim Mahila Andolan and Bhumata Brigade to secure equal 'right to pray', near the sanctum sanctorum (or traditional patriarchal prohibited areas). On 26 August 2016, the Bombay High Court ruled that women could enter the sanctum sanctorum. Women were allowed to enter the shrine on 29 November 2016, lifting a ban imposed in June 2012.

== Popular culture ==
- "Piya Haji Ali" song, from movie Fiza, was filmed in the dargah.
- Mumbai Meri Jaan, a 2008 Indian film, set a scene in the dargah.
- The climax of the super hit Hindi movie Coolie (1983) was shot in the dargah.
- There are several references to the mosque in Shantaram, the 2003 novel by Gregory David Roberts.
- The Film, a 2005 Indian feature film, starring Mahima Chaudhry set a very important Friday prayers scene in the dargah and chias sequence after the prayer on the pathway of dargah to the main road.
- In the 2025 Indian film Kuberaa, a character visits and eats at the mosque.

== See also ==
- Islam in India
- List of mosques in India
- Moinuddin Chishti
- Ashraf Jahangir Semnani
- Nizamuddin Awliya
- Turabul Haq Dargah
