= Bobojon Ghafurov =

Tajik historian and author (1908–1977)

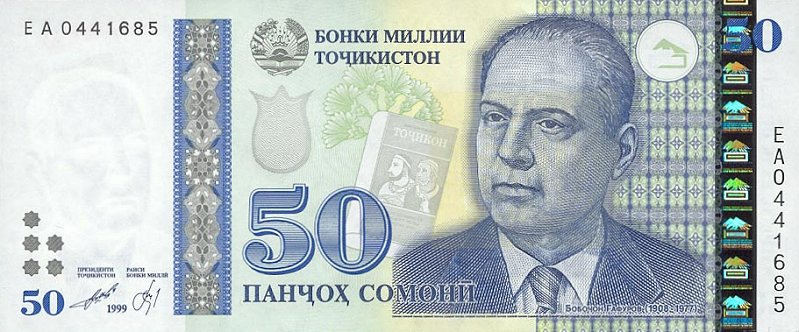
Bobojon Ghafurov on a Tajik banknote issued in honor of the 90th anniversary of his birth.

Bobojon Gafurovich Ghafurov (Tajik: Бобоҷон Ғафурович Ғафуров; 18 December 1908 – 12 July 1977) or Babadzan Gafurovich Gafurov (Russian: Бободжа́н Гафу́рович Гафу́ров) was a Tajik historian, academician, and the author of several books published in Russian and Tajik, including History of Tajikistan and The Tajiks.

== Biography ==
Ghafurov, the son of poet Roziya Ozod, was born in the village of Isfisar near Khujand in Tajikistan. He received his PhD from the Institute of History of the USSR Academy of Sciences in Moscow in 1941 with a dissertation on the History of the Isma'ili Sect. Ghafurov's book The Tajiks (Tojikon) is especially influential in modern Tajikistan. Instead of accepting that Tajiks were simply Uzbeks who "forgot their language", as Uzbek nationalists commonly argue, The Tajiks argues that Uzbeks were Turkified from the original Iranian population of Central Asia.

From 1944 to 1946, he was the Second Secretary and, from August 1946 to 24 May 1956, he was the First Secretary of the Central Committee of the Communist Party of Tajikistan. From 1956 to the end of his life, Ghafurov served as the Director of the Institute of Oriental Studies of the Academy of Sciences of the Soviet Union, and as the editor of the Asia and Africa journal." The town of Ghafurov and Ghafurov district (formally known as Bobojon Ghafurov district), in the Sughd Province of Tajikistan, are named after him.
