= Textual tradition of the Man'yōshū =

The Man'yōshū, an 8th-century Japanese anthology of waka, survives in a number of manuscripts dating to the 11th century and later.

== Overview ==
The surviving manuscripts of the Man'yōshū, an 8th-century Japanese anthology of waka, are broadly divided into three groups: the koten-bon, the jiten-bon, and the shinten-bon.

The koten (古点, "old glossing") refers to the readings of the Five Men of the Pear Chamber (Kiyohara no Motosuke, Ki no Tokibumi, Ōnakatomi no Yoshinobu, Minamoto no Shitagō and Sakanoue no Mochiki) from when they were commanded, in 951, to prepare readings of the Man'yōshū poems (Note: The Man'yōshū was compiled before the birth of Japan's indigenous writing systems, hiragana and katakana, and so its Japanese-language poems are written with a complex writing system using Chinese characters sometimes for their meanings and sometimes for their indigenous Japanese or sino-Japanese pronunciations.) during their compilation of the Gosen Wakashū. Of the 4,500-odd poems of the collection, they prepared readings for around 4,100, which included virtually all of the collection's tanka (poems with a 5-7-5-7-7 metre) and roughly half of the sedōka (5-7-7-5-7-7), but hardly any of the chōka (longer poems with an indefinite number of 5-7 verses and concluding 5-7-7). The original koten manuscript no longer survives, but the shinten (新点, "new glossing") texts sometimes include colour-distinguished annotations, and in such texts the poems written in black and without agreement are almost all poems that would have been included in the koten text (the "koten poems", 古点歌), so such texts are referred to koten texts, or koten-bon.

Jiten (次点, "following glossing") refers to glosses that were produced after the Five Men of the Pear Chamber but before Sengaku in the 13th century. The names of several of these "middle" annotators are known to history: in the notes to the koten text are Fujiwara no Michinaga, "the Ōe family" (possibly Ōe no Sukekuni or Ōe no Masafusa), Fujiwara no Atsutaka and Fujiwara no Kiyosuke; from prefaces Koremune no Takatoki (惟宗孝言) and Fujiwara no Nagatada; and from commentaries (etc.) Minamoto no Kunizane, Minamoto no Moroyori, Fujiwara no Mototoshi, Kenshō, and so on. Jiten texts are those that contain different coloured readings and that have the black overwritten in red where the two agree. Between 193 and 355 poems (the "jiten poems", 次点歌) have such glosses, and the texts of that level are the jiten texts, or jiten-bon. They differ from the shinten texts in that they typically contain glosses written in hiragana on a separate line from the main text, although exceptions such as the Kasuga-bon and Koyō Ryaku Ruijū-shō (古葉略類聚鈔) give readings in katakana beside the Chinese characters. No full manuscripts of all 20 books of the anthology survive from this period, and information on the jiten readings is gleaned from quotations in poetic treatises (kagaku-sho) such as Kenshō's Shūchū-shō (袖中抄) and from Man'yōshū poems that were included in imperial and personal collections.

Around the middle of the Kamakura period, the shogun Kujō Yoritsune commanded the monk Sengaku to continue the work that had been begun by Minamoto no Chikayuki. The work that Sengaku produced, based on a collation of between ten and twenty manuscripts to which he had access, not only included the main text with revised readings, but included readings for all the poems that had not been covered in the koten or jiten texts. These readings are called the Sengaku-shinten or shinten readings, and the poems covered by them but not by early editions (between 96 and 152 in total) are the Sengaku-shinten poems or shinten poems (仙覚新点歌 or 新点歌). Among the shinten texts that include colour-distinguished readings, the ones whose readings are given in red are the shinten poems, while those in black are the koten or jiten poems, and the readings in blue are Sengaku's revised readings therefor. Manuscripts derived from Sengaku's version are referred to as Sengaku shinten-bon, Sengaku-bon or shinten-bon.

Sengaku's work took place in four phases, in Kangen 4 (1246), Bun'ei 2), Bun'ei 3 and Bun'ei 10 (1265, 1266 and 1273 respectively), producing four textual lines called the Kangen-bon, Bun'ei Ninen-bon, Bun'ei Sannen-bon and Bun'ei Jūnen-bon, named for the eras/years they were produced. Manuscripts in three of these four textual lines are extant, with the one that has not survived being the Bun'ei Ninen-bon. The names koten, jiten and shinten are used in the postscript for the Bun'ei texts, etc. The shinten texts by-and-large have their readings in katakana, written vertically on the right of the main text. The exception is the Kangen-bon, which puts the koten and jiten readings on the right and Sengaku's own on the left. The Bun'ei texts place the reading Sengaku thought the correct one on the right, be it koten, jiten or shinten.

== Koten ==
=== Katsura-bon ===
The Katsura-bon, named for its having formerly been in the possession of the Katsura-no-miya house, is the oldest surviving Man'yōshū manuscript, having been copied around the middle of the Heian period.

It consists of 175 poems and an index of another 37, contained on a single scroll of roughly 1/3 of Book IV and a fragment occasionally called the Toganoo-gire.

It was likely copied by Minamoto no Kaneyuki, although there are several other theories. It is written on beautifully decorated, coloured paper, and shows hardly any influence of jiten readings, instead preserving the vestiges of the koten readings.

The stylized seal imprinted on the reverse indicates that it was in the holdings of Emperor Fushimi. The scroll was held by Maeda Matsu, the wife of Maeda Toshiie, and in the time of Maeda Toshitsune entered the holdings of the Katsura-no-miya household. In 1881, with the extinction of the Katsura-no-miya house, it passed into the possession of imperial household. The fragment changed hands numerous times having been variously held by the Maeda clan, the Hachisuka clan, the Masuda clan, the Saitō clan, the Tanaka clan, the Okamura clan and the Ikegami clan, as well as various institutions such as Ochanomizu University Library, the Gotoh Museum, the Idemitsu Museum of Arts and the Umezawa Museum (梅沢記念館 Umezawa Kinenkan).
