= Ki no Haseo =

Japanese poet and scholar

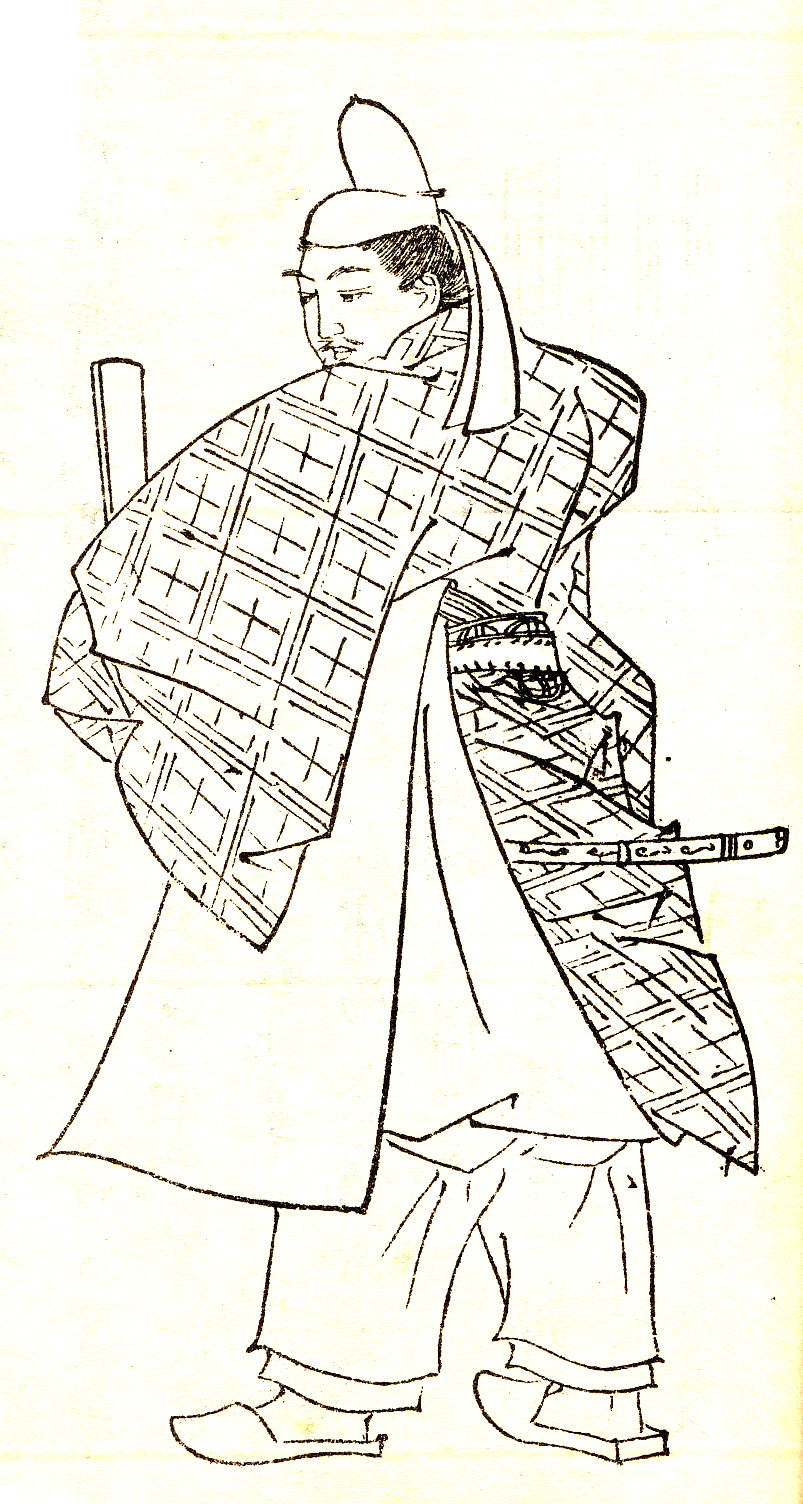
- A nineteenth century portrait of Ki no Haseo from Zenken Kojitsu by Kikuchi Yōsai.
- Native name: 紀長谷雄
- Born: 845
- Died: 912
- Language: Japanese, Chinese
- Period: Heian
- Genre: kanshi, waka
- Notable works: Kikashū
- Children: Ki no Yoshimochi

Ki no Haseo (紀長谷雄; 845-912) was a Japanese scholar, poet and diplomat active in the Heian period. He belonged to the Ki clan, which was politically influential in the Nara period, but lost its original position before his birth. He was an acquaintance of poets such as Miyako no Yoshika and Sugawara no Michizane, but was not closely affiliated with any political factions. In 894 he was appointed as a vice-ambassador during preparations to an ultimately canceled mission to China. He remained active as both a scholar and an official through the rest of his life. Many of works have been compiled in the collection Kikashū. While only one chapter survives, multiple poems and prose fragments which originally belonged to it have been identified. A second collection, Zoku Kike Shishū, is entirely lost. It is additionally sometimes proposed that he was also the author of Taketori Monogatari, but this remains uncertain. After his death a number of legends arose around him. Most notably, multiple variants of a tale in which he encounters an oni at Suzakumon are known.

== Biography ==
=== Family background and early life ===
Haseo was born as a member of the Ki clan, which unlike many other families of Heian period scholars was already considered politically influential in the preceding Nara period, though in the ninth century it was weakened and its members most likely held no hereditary positions. Haseo's father was Ki no Sadanori (紀貞範). Nothing else is known about his close relatives.

As a teenager Haseo studied under Miyako no Yoshika and Ōkura no Yoshiyuki, but his career in the subsequent decade of his life remains poorly known, and he only entered the academy in 876. He became a student of literature. A year later he met Sugawara no Michizane, who remained his close friend through the rest of his life. Over the course of 882 and 883, he was among officials appointed to accompany envoys from Balhae during their stay in the capital and on the journey back to Kaga.

=== Graduation ===
In 884 Haseo was declared a graduate student at the recommendation of Michizane, who in his evaluation favorably compared him to Yan Hui, the favorite disciple of Confucius. He was subsequently appointed to the position of secretary of Sanuki; in 886 he was promoted to junior secretary in the Council of State, in 890 to the director of the Bureau of Books and Drawings and in 891 to professor of history and literature. He became a renowned scholar of Chinese literature. His writings indicate he valued the works of Pan Yue and Xie Lingyun, but regarded Wang Bi and He Yan unfavorably.

As a scholar Haseo for the most part abstained from factional disputes, though he was viewed unfavorably by Miyoshi no Kiyoyuki due to positive treatment he received from Michizane. According to an anecdote preserved in the Gōdanshō, Kiyoyuki criticized his appointment to the position of a professor. The same source states that Haseo worried about the Fujiwara clan gaining control over scholarly circles, and that he sided with Miyako no Yoshika during a conflict sparked by Fujiwara no Sukeyo's intent to undergo examination as the first of its members to enter the academy.

=== Appointment as vice-ambassador to China ===
In 894 Haseo was supposed to accompany Michizane during a diplomatic mission to China as a vice-ambassador, but this project was canceled at the request of the latter. The reasons behind this decision are unclear, though it is possible the high cost of official missions and the proliferation of contacts with private Chinese traders granting Japan access to luxury goods without the need to send envoys to the continent were among the factors. Furthermore, piracy became a major issue starting with 893. Despite the abandonment of the plans to send him to China, Haseo continued to use the title of vice-ambassador for seven years, presumably due the prestige of this appointment. In 895 as a diplomat he took part in a poetic exchange organized for the ambassador of Balhae.

=== Later career ===
In 895 Haseo was appointed a junior assistant head of the Shikibu-shō; a year later he became the head of academy, though he continued to fulfill his duties in the ministry as well, and in 896 was promoted to senior assistant head.

In 903 Michizane entrusted Haseo with his new poem collection, Kanke Kōshū (菅家後集, "The Later Sugawara Collection"), which was entirely written after his exile to Dazaifu. It has been suggested that its popularization in the following years was one of the factors leading to the posthumous rehabilitation of Michizane. Haseo might have also been responsible for interceding with the imperial court on behalf of Michizane's sons.

In 907 Haseo was appointed as the governor of Sanuki. In 908 he participated in the compilation of Engi kyaku (延喜格), a collection of official documents of the daijō-kan and imperial edicts. In 911 he became a middle counselor, and in this capacity acted as one of the advisors of emperor Daigo.

=== Descendants ===
Ki no Yoshimochi was Haseo's son. His grandson was Ki no Arimasa, who held the position of a professor of literature. His more distant relatives include Ki no Tsurayuki and Ki no Tomonori, the compilers of the Kokin Wakashū, who belonged to a different branch of the Ki clan.

== Works ==
=== Poetry ===
Ki no Haseo was considered one of the leading kanshi poets of his times. He started composing at the age of eighteen. Like many other middle Heian poets, including Miyako no Yoshika, Shimada no Tadaomi, Ono no Takamura and Sugawara no Michizane, he was influenced by the works of Bai Juyi. Many of his poems are preserved in the Honchō Monzui'; additionally, four of his waka can be found in Gosen Wakashū. His various kanbun writings were collected in a volume known as Kikashū (紀家集), "the Ki family collection". It is poorly preserved, with only one of the original twenty chapters surviving. However, 56 poems originally belonging to it have been identified in other sources. A second collection of his poetry, Zoku Kike Shishū (續紀家詩集), is entirely lost.

=== Other genres ===
In addition to poems, examples of Haseo's prose also survive, including 52 fragments originally collected in the Kikashū. He was also the author of Engi Igo Shijo (延喜以後詩序; "A Preface to My Sinitic Poems Composed Since the Beginning of the Engi Era") in which he criticizes scholars in the court of emperor Daigo for their inability to express personal feelings through poetry. Some of his other prose works, including Bai Hakucho ō jo ("Introduction to the Old Man who Sold White Chopsticks") and Shiraishi Sensei den (白石先生伝; "Account of the Master of the White Stone"), reflect his interest in legends about Daoist immortals. In Honchō Shinsen-den (本朝神仙伝; "Accounts of Japanese Immortals"), Ōe no Masafusa states that the included version of the former story is merely an abridged retelling of Haseo's.

A number of prayers attributed to Haseo are also known. One example is the Honmyō Saimon (本命祭文), which focuses on Chinese deities invoked to extend a person's lifespan, such as Siming, Silu (司禄), Tiancao (天曹), Difu (地府), Hebo (河伯) and Shuiguan (水官).

=== Taketori Monogatari authorship theory ===
It is sometimes proposed that Haseo was the author of Taketori Monogatari. Richard H. Okada points out that he was well versed with kanbun and familiar with literary motifs pertaining to Daoist immortals, assumed to be an influence on this tale. He also highlights that some of his works, like the poem Song of a Destitute Woman, show an unusual degree of concern for the position of women in society, which he argues to be an element visible in Taketori Monogatari as well. However, other candidates have also been suggested, including Minamoto no Shitagō, Minamoto no Tōru, Henjō and Ki no Tsurayuki. No theory found universal acceptance so far, leaving the identity of the author uncertain.

== Legends ==
=== Encounter with an oni ===
==== Sources ====
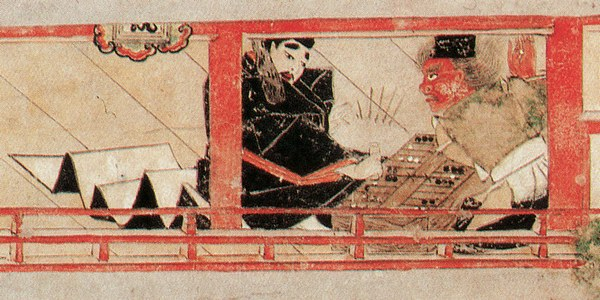
Haseo playing sugoroku with the oni.

A legend describing Ki no Haseo's game of sugoroku with an oni might have been in circulation as early as late as in the twelfth century, though written evidence only goes back to the late thirteenth century. The earliest versions have been identified in Zoku Kyōkunshō (続教訓抄), a musical treatise written at some point after 1270 by the court musician Koma no Tomokazu (狛朝葛; 1247–1331), and in a number of commentaries on the anthology Wakan Rōeishū. A version of this legend is also preserved in the scroll Haseo Sōshi from the collection of the Eisei Bunko Museum. It was formerly assumed that it was originally created in the fifteenth century, but the consensus shifted towards late thirteenth or early fourteenth century (late Kamakura period) dating. It is considered an early example of otogizōshi, though due to its relatively short length and early dating it is sometimes described as a setsuwa in emaki form instead. The version of the legend preserved in it has been translated into English as A Tale of Lord Haseo by Noriko T. Reider and as Haseo and the Gambling Stranger by Kristopher L. Reeves.

==== Summary ====
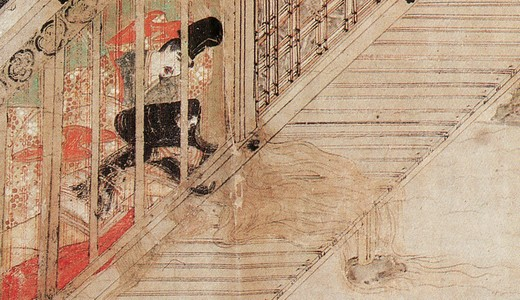
The woman turning into liquid.

The legend begins with a stranger approaching Haseo to offer him a game of sugoroku, to which he agrees. They arrive in the abode of the latter, Suzakumon, where they make a bet: if the stranger loses, he will present Haseo with an unusual woman, while in the reverse situation Haseo will have to forfeit all of his riches. Haseo soon realizes he is not playing against a human, as the previously disguised stranger gradually reveals his true form as an oni to him due to the stakes of the game making him emotional. He nonetheless eventually manages to win, and the oni introduces him to a young woman, warning him that despite her beauty he needs to be cautious, as it would be unsafe to make love to her sooner than in exactly a hundred days. Haseo at first obeys his instructions, but he grows attached to the woman, and after 80 days he starts to doubt if it is necessary. He embraces her, but she instantly turns into liquid, prompting him to mourn. Three months later Haseo encounters the oni again, but this time he acts hostile towards him, prompting him to call upon the protection of Tenjin, the deified Sugawara no Michizane. The oni is repelled, and the narrator reveals that he regretted entrusting the woman to Haseo and that she was created by him from pieces of corpses and would only gain a soul after 100 days.

==== Parallels with other legends ====
The legend of Haseo's encounter with an oni is considered one of the multiple examples of tales about talented scholars encountering supernatural creatures. According to Reider, it shows particularly close similarities with legends about Miyako no Yoshika encountering the oni of Rashōmon; she suggests the two stories might have been sometimes confused with each other or viewed as partially interchangeable, as in a number of variants Haseo meets the oni at Rashōmon and Yoshika at Suzakumon. A further related legend dealing with an oni interested in fine arts encountering a scholar focuses on Minamoto no Hiromasa.

The creation of a new person from pieces of corpses is also described as a skill of oni in a legend recorded in the Senjūshō in which Saigyō after hearing about it attempts to replicate the process on Mount Kōya. Another example of a similar motif is a legend from the preface of the treatise Sangoku Sōden Onmyō Kankatsu Hoki Naiden Kin'u Gyokuto-shū (三國相傳陰陽輨轄簠簋内伝金烏玉兎集) in which Abe no Seimei is resurrected by the sage Hakudō Shōnin (伯道上人), who assembles his "12 big bones and 360 small bones" to accomplish that.

==== Modern reception ====
Modern literary adaptations of the legend include Takeshi Umehara's Haseo no Koi ("Haseo's Love") and Baku Yumemakura's Ki no Haseo Suzakumon ni te onna wo arasoi oni to sugoroku wo suru koto (紀長谷雄朱雀門にて女を争い鬼と双六をする語; "Ki no Haseo Plays Sugoroku with an Oni at Suzaku Gate with a Bet of a Woman"). While both authors remain largely faithful to the original legend, they omit the appearance of Tenjin, and instead focus on portraying the oni as acting friendly towards Haseo as a fellow connoisseur of the fine arts. Furthermore, while in the original legend the woman receives no name and never speaks, Yumemakura makes her an active participant in the events who develops a relationship with Haseo herself.

=== Other legends ===
The thirteenth century Hase-dera Genki (長谷寺験記; "A Record of the Miracles of Hase Temple") states that Haseo was named in honor of Hase-dera because he was born after his father prayed there to the bodhisattva Kannon.

A tale from Konjaku Monogatarishū (volume 24, tale 1), Kitanohe Minister and Ki no Haseo, describes a meeting between Ki no Haseo and a spirit reciting poetry on moonlit nights on top of Suzakumon. Another legend from the same collection (volume 28, story 29) portrays Haseo as a talented scholar who is nonetheless unfamiliar with onmyōdō, and as a result ignores the advice of an onmyōji who divines that he will encounter a harmless oni, who turns out to be a dog who disturbs a meeting held by him.
