= Miyako no Yoshika =

Japanese poet and scholar

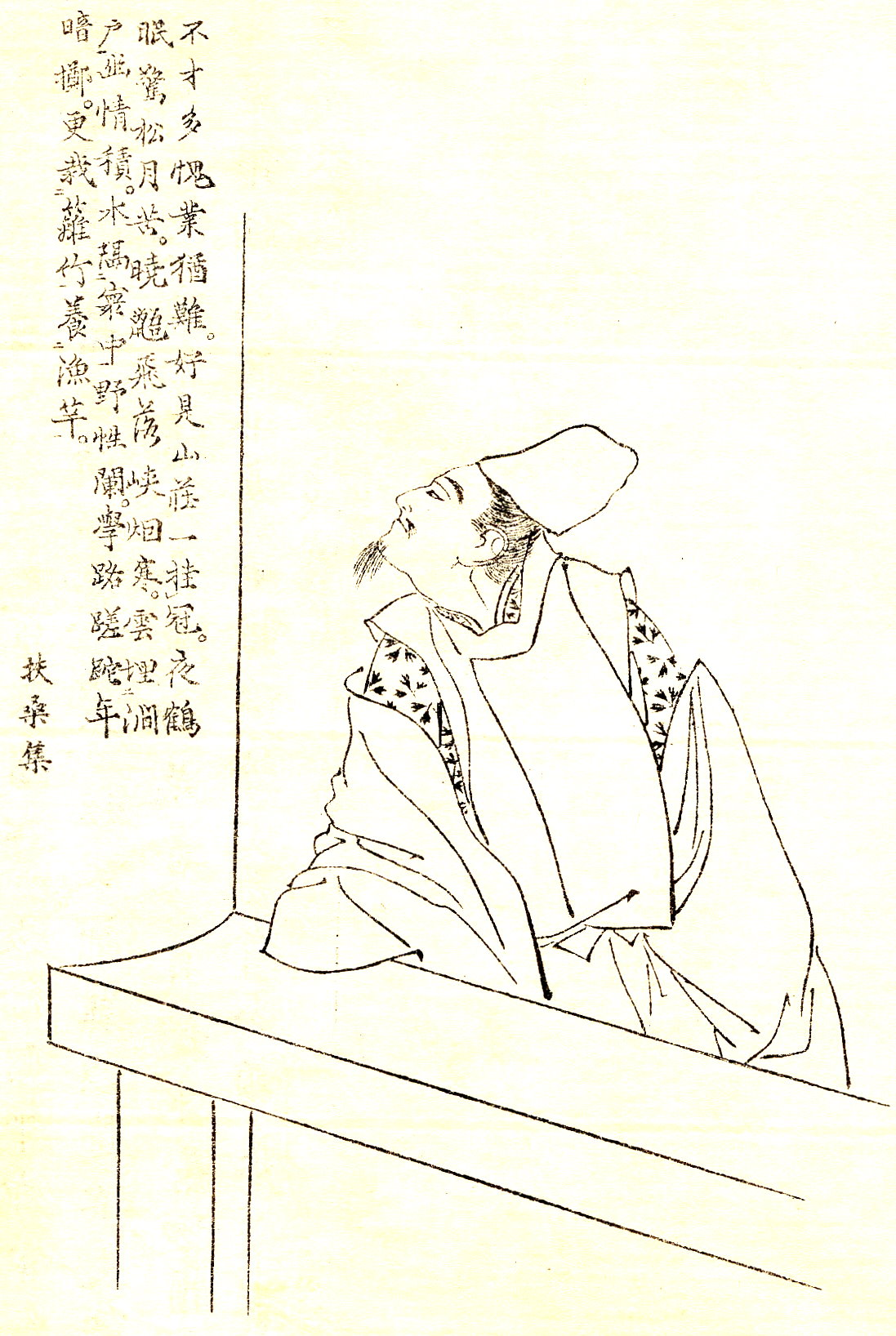
- A nineteenth century portrait of Miyako no Yoshika from Zenken Kojitsu by Kikuchi Yōsai.
- Native name: 都良香
- Born: 834
- Died: 879
- Occupation: lesser private secretary (from 870), professor of literature (from 875)
- Language: Japanese, Chinese
- Period: Heian
- Genre: kanshi, waka
- Notable works: Toshi Bunshū, Nihon Montoku Tennō Jitsuroku
- Children: Miyako no Arinaka

Miyako no Yoshika (都良香; 834–879) was a Japanese poet, scholar and court official active in the Heian period. He was responsible for the civil service examination of Sugawara no Michizane and later acted as one of the compilers of the Nihon Montoku Tennō Jitsuroku. Many documents prepared by him, as well as a number of his poems, were collected in a volume known as Toshi Bunshū (都氏文集), which only survives in fragments. He became the subject of a number of legends describing his encounters with supernatural beings, such as the oni of Rashōmon and the goddess Benzaiten, as well as with pursuit of immortality.

== Biography ==
=== Early life ===
Yoshika was a son of Miyako no Sadutsugu (都貞継) and a nephew of Miyako no Haraaka (都腹赤), an official and poet active during the reign of emperor Saga. According to Robert Borgen, Yoshika's family was "hardly eminent" overall, but his uncle served as a professor of literature from 821 to 829 and might have influenced his early career. In 860 Yoshika began studying in the Shikibu-shō. According to Ōe no Masafusa he showed exceptional skill as a student. After completing his studies he was appointed to various administrative positions in the provinces of Aki and Harima.

=== Appointment as a lesser private secretary ===
In 870 Yoshika became a lesser private secretary (少内記, shōnaiki). His duties included preparing draft documents for the emperor, as well as conducting university entrance and civil service examinations.

Yoshika served as the examiner of Sugawara no Michizane. While according to a legend present in many historical biographies of Michizane Yoshika first met him at a banquet he organized, during which he declared that his archery skills are a sign he will perform well in his upcoming examination, there is no evidence such an event ever occurred. While it was considered customary in contemporary China for the relationship between an official and his former examiner to be cordial, in Japan this was uncommon, and typically the examiner and his examinees belonged to different scholarly circles, and there was no expectation of loyalty developing between them based on successful examination. In his evaluation of Michizane's essays submitted as a part of this procedure Yoshika critically evaluated what he saw as insufficiently rigorous sourcing of cited Buddhist texts, improperly identified Chinese names, as well as numerous grammatical errors, and granted him the lowest passing grade permitted by the ritsuryō code. However, Borgen stresses that Yoshika's judgment was not unusually harsh, and awarding low passing grades to candidates was the norm through the entire ninth century and did not mean the examiners saw them as unskilled. In his evaluation, Yoshika also praised Michizane's style despite his objections. They subsequently shared the same offices multiple times. In 871 they have been entrusted with determining together if emperor Seiwa should follow his late grandmother's wish to not be mourned to the full extent expected by tradition. However, according to Borgen they were not on friendly terms, possibly because Michizane's dissatisfaction with Yoshika's harsh evaluation of his examination answers.

Ki no Haseo studied under Yoshika for a time. It has been argued that he was his main disciple. According to the Gōdanshō, he sided with Yoshika when he voiced opposition to Fujiwara no Sukeyo's bid to become the first member of the Fujiwara clan to take the civil service examination; they feared that as a well established noble clan, the Fujiwaras will be able to gain control over the academy, displacing scholars from less prestigious families.

=== Later career ===
In 872 Yoshika took part in the reception of an embassy from Balhae. He also studied esoteric Buddhist doctrine in Tō-ji. In 875 he was appointed to the position of a professor of literature and subsequently took part in the compilation of Nihon Montoku Tennō Jitsuroku. While it is agreed he was a major contributor, he died before it was completed.

=== Descendants ===
According to the Gōdanshō, a late Heian collection of anecdotes and poetry commentaries by Ōe no Masafusa and Fujiwara no Sanekane, Yoshika had a son named Arinaka (在中) who became a poet and scholar like him, but the dates of his birth and death are unknown.

== Works ==
Through his courtly career Miyako no Yoshika composed poetry. Anecdotes preserved in the Gōdanshō, Kokon Chomonjū and Jikkinshō indicate he was particularly renowned for his kanshi (poems composed in Chinese), though he also wrote waka. His style was influenced by Bai Juyi, a Chinese poet whose works were transmitted in Japan in the middle of the ninth century. Yoshika's kanbun writings were compiled into a collection known as Toshi Bunshū (都氏文集), which originally consisted of six volumes, though only three survive today. Most of the remaining sections are compilations official documents, such as examination questions and evaluations, while most of the poems have been lost. However, examples of Yoshika's poetry are preserved in collections such as Honchō Monzui, Fusōshū, Wakan Rōeishū and Kokin Wakashū.

Two other of Yoshika's works, Shinsen Saku (神仙策; "Plan of the Immortals") and Fujisan-ki (富士山記; "Records of Mount Fuji"), reflect his interest in legends about Daoist immortals. The latter work describes Mount Fuji as the dwelling of female immortals. It is also the oldest description of its crater and might indicate that it has already been climbed in the Heian period.

== Legends ==
=== Encounter with an oni ===
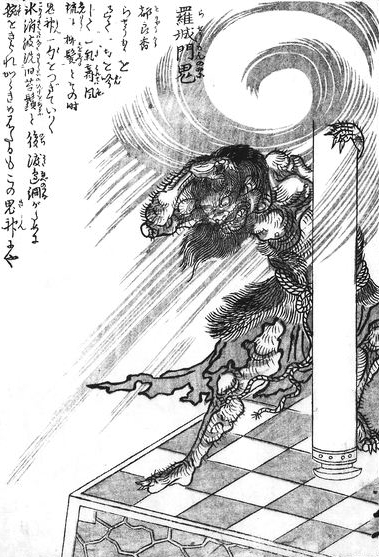
An eighteenth century illustration of the oni of Rashōmon from Konjaku Hyakki Shūi by Toriyama Sekien.

Multiple variants of a legend about a meeting between Miyako no Yoshika and an oni exist. According to Mori Masato, the oldest example, which involves the oni of Rashōmon, can be found in the Gōdanshō. However, in this version no meeting occurs: while the tale deals with the oni being moved by a poem composed by Yoshika, he hears it when a nameless horseman recites it while passing under the gate. A similar legend can be found in the Honchō Shinsen-den (本朝神仙伝; "Accounts of Japanese Immortals"), though there the oni resides in Suzakumon rather than Rashōmon. In other variants the oni meets Yoshika himself, and the poem is presented as the result of cooperation between them. In the Wakan Rōeishū Shichū (和漢朗詠集私註; "Private commentaries on Japanese and Chinese poems to sing"), originally written in 1161, Yoshika encounters the oni of Rashōmon, who hears him reciting an unfinished poem and is moved by it to such a degree that he finishes it himself. A similar variant can be found in the Jikkinshō. After the encounter Yoshika presents the poem to Sugawara no Michizane, who is able to tell part of it was composed by an oni. Further similar versions are known from thirteenth century Senjūshō and early sixteenth century Hokekyō Shūrin Shūyōshō (法華經鷲林拾葉鈔; "Commentary on Lotus Sutra, Collected from Vulture Woods"), though the oni resides in Suzakumon in them, which according to Noriko Reider might indicate a degree of confusion or interchangeability between legends about Yoshika and Ki no Haseo, as tales about the latter encountering an oni interested in fine arts at either Suzakumon or Rashōmon are also known.

=== Attaining immortality ===
Miyako no Yoshika is portrayed as a Daoist immortal in the Honchō Shinsen-den compiled by Ōe no Masafusa at an uncertain date before 1109. The original manuscript does not survive, and the oldest known copy dates back to 1356. While the individual tales included in it are classified as setsuwa by researchers, they lack didactic and moralistic messages. They combine Buddhist and Daoist elements. According to Christoph Kleine and Livia Kohn it is possible that Masafusa aimed to create a Japanese equivalent of Chinese compilations of legends about immortals out of intellectual curiosity and national pride, as opposed to religious conviction. Yoshika and Tachibana no Masamichi are the only literati among the described immortals. Kleine notes that the stories about them are the most similar to the Chinese model of pursuit of immortality. Their inclusion might also reflect Masafusa's need to show that members of his profession were also capable of attaining it.

According to Masafusa, Yoshika was born in Kyoto and from a young age displayed unusual physical abilities, such as being able to run faster than a galloping horse. He first decided to become an "eccentric immortal" (Note: He is also given the title of "world's greatest maniac"; unusual, eccentric behavior is a common characteristic of immortals in Chinese literature, for example in tales about the Seven Sages of the Bamboo Grove or the Eight Immortals.) after spending a night with the concubine of his examiner, lord Yoshinawa. He subsequently attained success first as a student, and then as a scholar and poet. However, he only started to pursue immortality when Sugawara no Michizane was appointed to a higher position than him despite being one of his examinees, which caused him to quit courtly life and enter the mountains in hopes of encountering immortals. (Note: Seekers of immortality are commonly characterized as disillusioned with their careers in Chinese literature.) In reality, while there is evidence that Yoshika and Michizane were not on friendly terms, the former died prematurely at the age of 46 two months after the latter's promotion. Masafusa states that while nobody knows what happened to Yoshika, he has been sighted a century later in a mountain cave, showing no signs of aging. His immortality is explained as a result of practicing methods of the immortals (仙法, senpō). However, it is left unexplained what they entailed.

In addition to describing Yoshika himself as an immortal, Masafusa also cites his lost work Yoshinosan-ki (吉野山記, "Record of Mount Yoshino") as a source in his account of En no Gyōja's deeds; since the legend differs from more widespread versions, it is possible he saw his work as possessing unique literary value.

A different legend portraying Yoshika as an immortal describes his meeting with Benzaiten at Chikubu Island. As recorded in Fukurozōshi and Jikkinshō, he began composing a poem while visiting a shrine dedicated to her, but could not finish it until the goddess revealed a suitable ending to him in the form of an oracle. Bernard Faure suggests the tale might be related to a legend recorded in Fusō Kogo Ryōishū (扶桑古語霊異集), in which Yoshika visited the village of Hira at the shore of lake Biwa in 865, and encountered a white-haired old man (possibly the local deity Shirahige Myōjin) who taught him about various events from the history of the Ise and Hie shrines.
