= Katsura-bon =

Oldest extant copy of the Man'yōshū

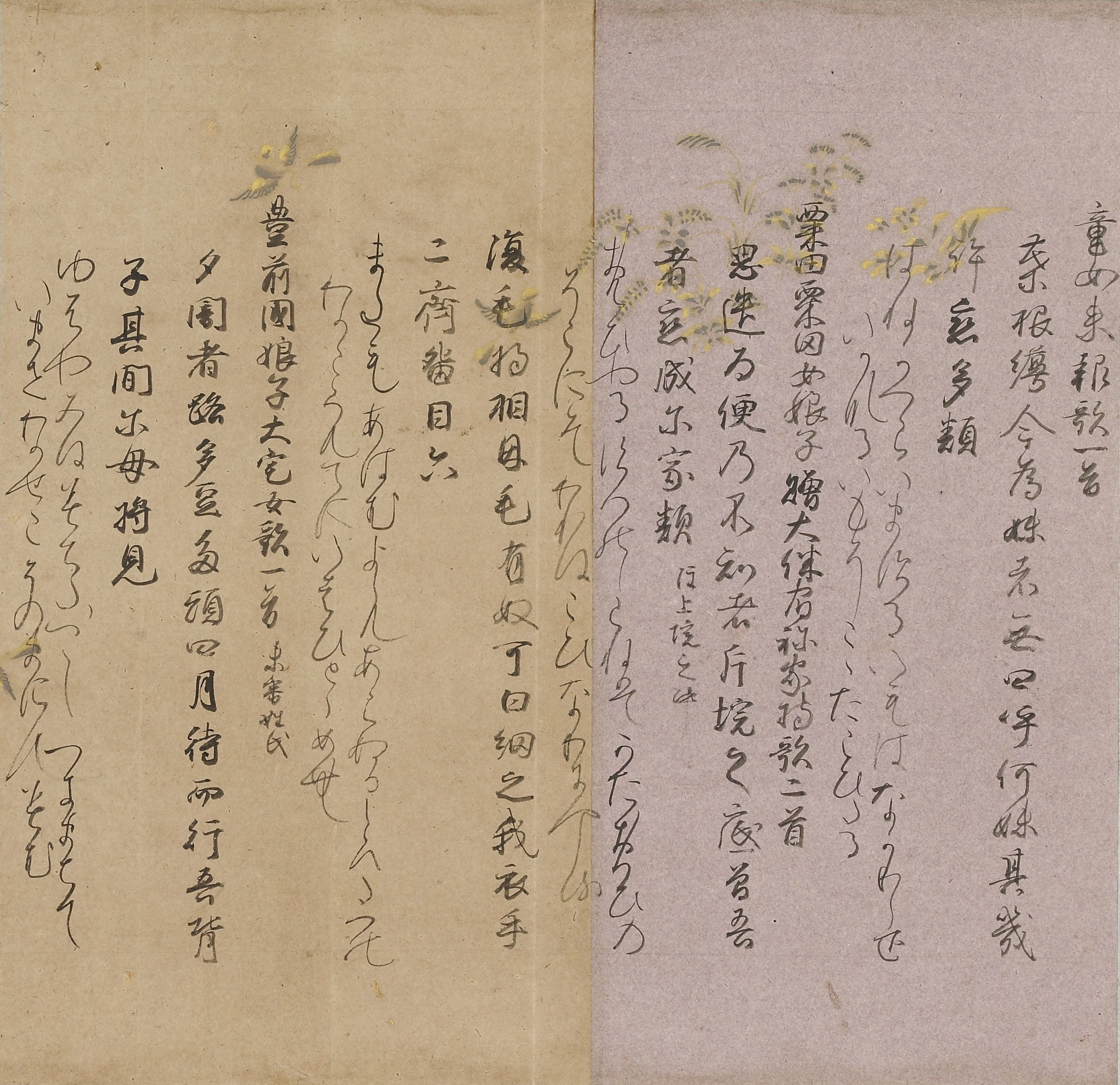
A page of Katsura-bon Man'yōshū manuscript, Nomura Art Museum

The Katsura-bon (桂本) is the oldest extant copy of the Man'yōshū. It was produced around the middle of the Heian period, and is named for having formerly been in the possession of the Katsura-no-miya family.

== Overview ==
The Katsura-bon is the oldest surviving Man'yōshū manuscript, and was copied around the middle of the Heian period. It is named for the Katsura-no-miya house, which had possession of the book at one time. It consists of 175 poems and an index of another 37. These are written on a single scroll containing 109 poems from Book IV, or roughly 1/3 of the book, along with another fragment (occasionally called the Toganoo-gire 栂尾切) containing 66 poems along with an index of 37 more.

It was likely copied by Minamoto no Kaneyuki, although other theories propose Ki no Tsurayuki, Minamoto no Shitagō, Fujiwara no Yukinari and Minamoto no Toshifusa. It is written on beautiful coloured paper decorated with images of flowers, birds, grass and trees. It is said to show hardly any influence of jiten readings, and to preserve the vestiges of the koten readings. (Note: The Man'yōshū was compiled before the birth of Japan's indigenous writing systems, hiragana and katakana, and so its Japanese-language poems are written with a complex writing system using Chinese characters sometimes for their meanings and sometimes for their indigenous Japanese or sino-Japanese pronunciations. The koten, or "old glosses", were the readings compiled by the Five Men of the Pear Chamber in the mid-10th century, while the jiten, or "following glosses", are those that date from any time between then and the mid-13th century when the monk Sengaku compiled his influential edition.)

The stylized seal imprinted on the reverse indicates that it was in the holdings of Emperor Fushimi. The scroll was held by Maeda Matsu, the wife of Maeda Toshiie, and in the time of Maeda Toshitsune entered the holdings of the Katsura-no-miya household. In 1881, with the extinction of the Katsura-no-miya house, it passed into the possession of imperial household. The fragment changed hands numerous times having been variously held by the Maeda clan, the Hachisuka clan, the Masuda clan, the Saitō clan, the Tanaka clan, the Okamura clan and the Ikegami clan, as well as various institutions such as Ochanomizu University Library, the Gotoh Museum, the Idemitsu Museum of Arts and the Umezawa Museum (梅沢記念館 Umezawa Kinenkan).
