= Kana preface =

Preface to the Kokin Wakashū

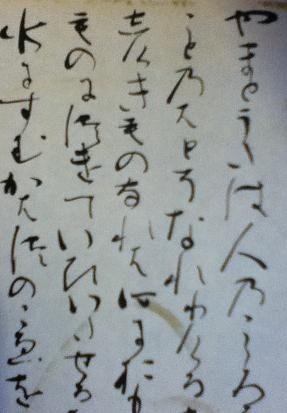
Preface to the Kokin Wakashu by Fujiwara Teika

The kana preface to the Kokin Wakashū (古今和歌集仮名序 Kokin Wakashū kana-jo, 古今集仮名序 Kokinshū kana-jo, or simply 仮名序 kana-jo; rekishi-teki kanazukai: 假名序) is one of the two prefaces to the tenth-century Japanese waka anthology, the Kokin Wakashū. It was written by the poet/editor Ki no Tsurayuki. It is also known in English as the Japanese preface, distinguishing it from Ki no Yoshimochi's Chinese preface (mana-jo). It was the first serious work of poetic criticism on the waka style, and is regarded as the predecessor of later karon works.

== Authorship, date and context ==
The kana preface, or Japanese preface, is one of the two prefaces that were given to the Kokin Wakashū, a tenth-century anthology of Japanese waka poetry. It was written by Ki no Tsurayuki, the principal compiler of the anthology.

The other is Ki no Yoshimochi's Chinese preface (mana-jo).

The kana preface was written between the second month of Engi 6 (906) and the first month of the following year.

== Contents ==
The kana preface opens with a detailed and poetic explication of what the core concept of waka poetry is. It divides the waka into six stylistic categories, explaining each of those categories and giving an example. These categories were derived from the Grand Preface to the Shi Jing, and their application to Japanese poetry has been criticized as "halfhearted" and "meaningless".

It then goes on to discuss the ideal waka, listing two poets (probably Kakinomoto no Hitomaro and Yamabe no Akahito) as the ideal poets, as well as six great poets (the Rokkasen) from what was then the recent past. Finally, it touches on the compilation process for the Kokin Wakashū and speculates on the future of the waka.

== Reception ==
The opening lines of kana preface have been regarded as the archetypal work of Japanese classical prose. Its status in the poetic tradition made Tsurayuki the arbiter of Japanese poetic criticism until the Meiji period.

Donald Keene, in his Seeds in the Heart: Japanese Literature from Earliest Times to the Late Sixteenth Century, called it "one of the earliest and best-known documents of Japanese poetic criticism". Haruo Shirane called the famous opening lines of the preface "line for line, [...] undoubtedly the most heavily commented secular prose text of the Japanese tradition".

== Works cited ==
- Fujioka, Tadaharu (1983). "Ki no Tsurayuki". Nihon Koten Bungaku Daijiten 日本古典文学大辞典 (in Japanese). Vol. 2. Tokyo: Iwanami Shoten. pp. 153–155. OCLC 11917421.
- Keene, Donald (1999) [1993]. A History of Japanese Literature, Vol. 1: Seeds in the Heart – Japanese Literature from Earliest Times to the Late Sixteenth Century (paperback ed.). New York, NY: Columbia University Press. ISBN 978-0-231-11441-7.
- Kyūsojin, Hitaku; Fujioka, Tadaharu (1983). "Kokin Wakashū". Nihon Koten Bungaku Daijiten 日本古典文学大辞典 (in Japanese). Vol. 2. Tokyo: Iwanami Shoten. pp. 548–552. OCLC 11917421.
- Ōoka, Makoto (1971). Ki no Tsurayuki. Tokyo: Chikuma Shobō.
- Shirane, Haruo (2012). Traditional Japanese Literature: An Anthology, Beginnings to 1600 (Abridged Edition) (paperback ed.). New York, NY: Columbia University Press. ISBN 978-0-231-15731-5.
