= Makurakotoba =

Epithets are used in association with certain words in Japanese waka poetry

Makurakotoba (枕詞, lit. 'pillow words') are figures of speech used in Japanese waka poetry in association with certain words. The set phrase can be thought of as a "pillow" for the noun or verb it describes, although the actual etymology is not fully known. It can also describe associations and allusions to older poems (see honkadori).

Many have lost their original meaning but are still used. They are not to be confused with utamakura ("poem pillow"), which are a category of poetic words used to add greater mystery and depth to poems. Makurakotoba are present in the Kojiki, one of Japan's earliest chronicles.

== History and usage ==
Makurakotoba are most familiar to modern readers in the Man'yōshū, and when they are included in later poetry, it is to make allusions to poems in the Man'yōshū. The exact origin of makurakotoba remains contested to this day, though both the Kojiki and the Nihon Shoki, two of Japan's earliest chronicles, use it as a literary technique.

In terms of usage, makurakotoba are often used at the beginning of a poem. The jokotoba is a similar figure of speech used in Man'yōshū poetry, used to introduce a poem. In fact, the 17th-century Buddhist priest and scholar Keichū wrote that "if one says jokotoba, one speaks of long makurakotoba" in his Man'yō-taishōki. Japanese scholar Shinobu Orikuchi also echoes this statement, claiming that makurakotoba are jokotoba that have been compressed.

While some makurakotoba still have meanings that add to the meaning of the following word, many others have lost their meanings. As makurakotoba became standardized and used as a way to follow Japanese poetic traditions, many were used only as decorative phrases in poems and not for their meanings. Many translators of waka poems face difficulty when translating makurakotoba, because although they make up the first line, many have no substantial meaning, and it is impossible to discard the whole first line of a waka. It is said that Sei Shōnagon often used this technique in The Pillow Book, and some earlier scholars thought that they were named after the book, but most agree now that the practice was fairly common at the time she wrote the Pillow Book.

== Examples ==
There are many instances of makurakotoba found in the Man'yōshū. The very first poem demonstrates how this was used:

ko mo yo mi-ko mochi
fukushi mo yo mi-bukushi mochi
kono oka ni na tsumasu ko
ie kikana na norasane
sora mitsu Yamato-no-kuni wa
oshinabete ware koso ore
shikinabete ware koso imase
ware koso wa norame
ie o mo na o mo

Translation:

Girl with your basket, your pretty basket,
With your shovel, with your pretty shovel,
Gathering shoots on the hillside here,
I want to ask your home. Tell me your name!
The land of Yamato, seen by the gods on high―
It is all my realm in all of it I reign supreme.
I will tell you my home and my name.

In this poem, sora mitsu (literally "sky-seen" or "sky-spreading") modifies the place name Yamato.

Some historical makurakotoba have developed into the usual words for their meaning in modern Japanese, replacing the terms they originally alluded to. For example, niwa tsu tori (庭つ鳥, bird of the garden) was in classical Japanese a makurakotoba for kake (鶏, chicken). In modern Japanese, niwatori has displaced the latter word outright and become the everyday word for "chicken" (dropping the case marker tsu along the way).

Some more makurakotoba are listed below:

| Makurakotoba | Meaning | Modifies |
|---|---|---|
| 青丹よし (aoni yoshi) | "good blue-black clay" | place name 奈良 (Nara) |
| 茜さす (akane sasu) | "shining madder red" | 日 (hi; "sun"), 昼 (hiru; "daytime"), 君 (kimi; "lord") |
| 秋山の (akiyama no) | "autumn mountain" | したふ (shitau; "for leaves to turn red"), 色なつかし (iro natsukashi; "emotionally moving colors") |
| 葦が散る (ashi ga chiru) | "scattered reeds" | place name 難波 (Naniwa) |
| 麻裳よし (asamo yoshi) | "good hemp" | place name 紀 (Ki) |
| 足引きの (ashi-hiki no) | uncertain, possibly "foot-dragging" | 山 (yama; "mountain"), words beginning with yama, etc. |
| 梓弓 (azusa yumi) | "birchwood bow", erroneously "catalpa bow" | 引く (hiku; "to pull"), 元 (moto; "base"), 矢 (ya; "arrow"), etc. |
| 鯨取り (isana tori) | "whale hunting" | 海 (umi; "sea"), 灘 (nada; "open sea"), 浜 (hama; "beach"), etc. |
| 石綱の (iwatsuna no) | "ivy-colored rocks" | 復ち返る (ochikaeru; "to get younger") |
| 石走る (iwa-bashiru) | "rock-running" | 滝 (taki; "waterfall"), place name 近江 (Ōmi), etc. |
| 打ち靡く (uchinabiku) | "fluttering, streaming" | 春 (haru; "spring"), place name 草香 (Kusaka) |
| 打ち寄する (uchiyosuru) | "rush toward" | place name 駿河 (Suruga) |
| 神風の (kamikaze no) | "divine wind" | place name 伊勢 (Ise), 五十鈴 (Isuzu) |
| 草枕 (kusamakura) | "grass pillow" | 旅 (tabi; "journey"), 結ぶ (musubu; "to tie"), 露 (tsuyu; "dew") |
| 言喧く (koto saeku) | "twittered words" | 韓 (Kara; Korea), 百済 (Kudara; "Baekje") |
| 高麗剣 (Koma tsurugi) | "Korean sword" | place name 和射見 (Wazami) |
| 隠りくの (komoriku no) | "hidden land" | place name 初瀬 (Hatsuse) |
| そらみつ (sora mitsu) | uncertain, possibly "sky-seen" or "sky-spreading" | place name 大和 (Yamato) |
| 玉藻よし (tamamo yoshi) | "good jeweled seaweed" | place name 讃岐 (Sanuki) |
| 栲縄の (takunawa no) | "hemp rope" | 長し (nagashi; "long"), 千尋 (chihiro; "extremely long") |
| 玉衣の (tamaginu no) | "jeweled clothes" | 騒騒 (saisai; "rustling") |
| 魂極る (tama kiwaru) | "soul ending" | 命 (inochi; "life"), 世 (yo; "world") |
| 玉襷 (tamadasuki) | "jeweled cord" | place name 畝傍 (Unebi), 懸く (kaku; "attach"), 雲 (kumo; "clouds") |
| 千早振る (chihayaburu) | "powerful, mighty", erroneously "thousand-rock smashing" | place name 宇治 (Uji), 神 (kami; "gods"), etc. |
| 時つ風 (toki tsu kaze) | "seasonal/timely wind" | place name 吹飯 (Fukei) |
| 灯火の (tomoshibi no) | "lamplight" | place name 明石 (Akashi) |
| 鶏が鳴く (tori ga naku) | "bird-calling" | 東 (azuma; "eastland") |
| 妻籠もる (tsuma-gomoru) | "spouse-hiding" | 屋 (ya; "home, roof"), 矢 (ya; "arrow") |
| 春霞 (haru-gasumi) | "spring mist/haze" | place name 春日 (Kasuga), 立つ (tatsu; "rise") |
| 日の本の (hi no moto no) | "source of the sun" | place name 大和 (Yamato) |
| 蜷の腸 (mina no wata) | "marsh(-black) snail guts" | か黒し (kaguroshi; "completely black") |
| 百敷の (momoshiki no) | "many-stoned" | 大宮 (ōmiya; "great palace") |

== See also ==
- Honkadori
- Jokotoba
- Kakekotoba
- Kenning
- Onomatopoeia
- The Pillow Book
- Utamakura
- Epithets in Homer

== Notes ==
=== Additional sources ===
- Duthie, Torquil (2007), "Man'yōshū (Collection of Myriad Leaves, CA.785): Introduction", in Shirane, Haruo; Arntzen, Sonja (eds.), Traditional Japanese Literature: An Anthology, Beginnings to 1600, New York: Columbia University Press, pp. 60–63
- McAuley, Thomas (19 January 2016), "Makura Kotoba", Waka Poetry
- Larsson, Kris, The Man'yoshu, archived from the original on 10 May 2008
- Keene, Donald (May 1964), "Problems of Translating Decorative Language", The Journal-Newsletter of the Association of Teachers of Japanese, 2 (1/2): 4–12, doi:10.2307/488700, JSTOR 488700
- Machacek, Gregory (Autumn 1994), "The Occasional Contextual Appropriateness of Formulaic Diction in the Homeric Poems", The American Journal of Philology, 115 (3): 321–335, doi:10.2307/295361, JSTOR 295361
