= Ki no Yoshimochi =

Ki no Yoshimochi (紀 淑望; died 919) was a Japanese poet of both waka and kanshi (Japanese and Chinese poetry, respectively). He also composed the Chinese preface (mana-jo) to the tenth-century waka anthology, the Kokin Wakashū. He studied classics at the Imperial University, before serving various, mostly scholarly, positions at court.

== Biography ==
The date of birth of Ki no Yoshimochi is unknown. He was the first-born son of Ki no Haseo (紀 長谷雄) and the elder brother of Ki no Yoshihito (紀 淑人) and Ki no Yoshimitsu (紀 淑光), and may have been the adopted son of Ki no Tsurayuki.

In Kanpyō 8 (896) he entered the Imperial University as a student of Chinese (文章生, monjōshō). In 906 (Engi 6), he attained the Junior Fifth Rank, Lower Grade, and in 912 was promoted to the Junior Fifth Rank, Upper Grade, having acted as Director of the University (大学頭, daigaku-no-kami) and Teacher of the Classics for the Crown Prince (東宮学士, tōgū-gakushi). In 913 he became Provisional Vice-Governor of Shinano (信濃権介, Shinano no gon-no-suke).

He died in 919, Engi 19.

== Works ==
The Nihongi Kyōen Waka (日本紀竟宴和歌), Kokin Wakashū and Shinkokin Wakashū each include one waka (poem in Japanese) attributed to him, but it seems his Chinese writings were held in higher regard, as the Wakan rōeishū leads one of its books with a kanshi (Chinese poem) by him and he was selected to write the Chinese preface to the Kokin Wakashū (see below).

=== Prose writings ===
He wrote the Chinese preface (mana-jo) to the Kokin Wakashū, in which he expressed the view that all poetry has its source in human emotion. This view was popular in China (including in his major source for his preface, the major preface to the Shi Jing) and Japan, and reflects an east Asian attitude to poetry not shared in other parts of the world where major poetry was frequently inspired by battles, heroes, gods and the communication of moral truths. The preface dates itself to the fourth month of 905.

== Works cited ==
- Kigoshi, Takashi (1983). "Ki no Yoshimochi". Nihon Koten Bungaku Daijiten 日本古典文学大辞典 (in Japanese). Vol. 2. Tokyo: Iwanami Shoten. p. 157. OCLC 11917421.
- Keene, Donald (1999) [1993]. A History of Japanese Literature, Vol. 1: Seeds in the Heart – Japanese Literature from Earliest Times to the Late Sixteenth Century (paperback ed.). New York, NY: Columbia University Press. ISBN 978-0-231-11441-7.
