= Wakan rōeishū =

11th-century anthology of Chinese and Japanese poetry

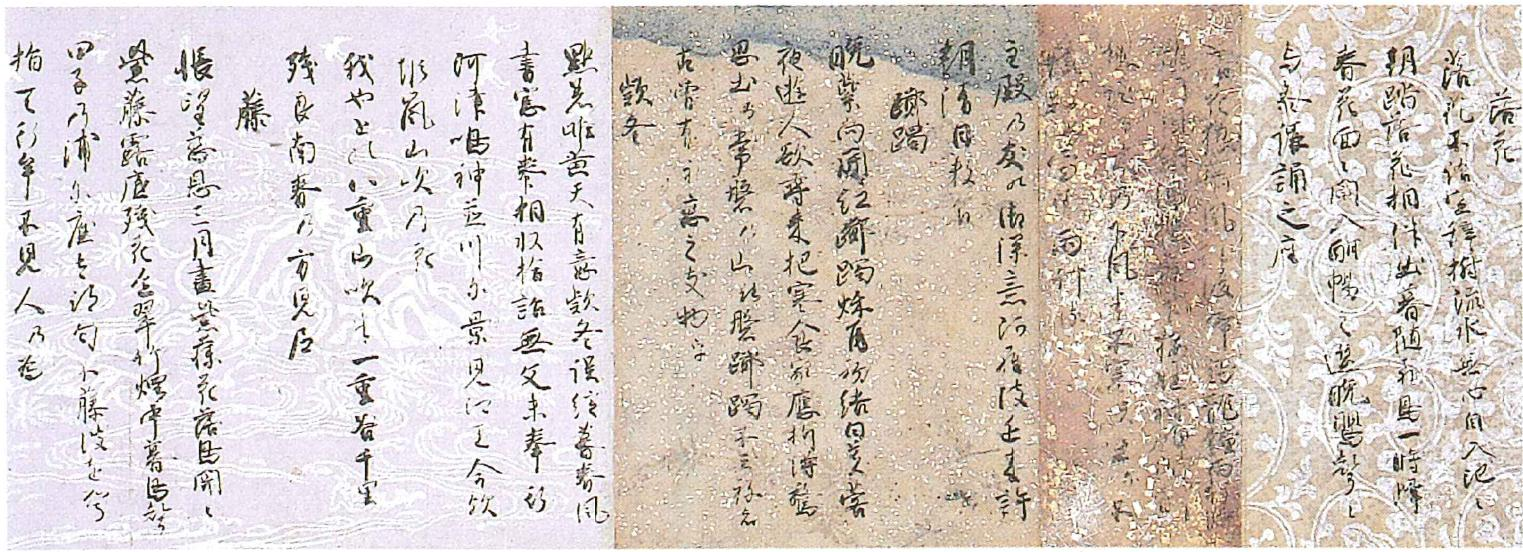
Poems from the Wakan rōeishū, by Fujiwara no Kintō

The Wakan Rōeishū (和漢朗詠集; Collection of Japanese and Chinese Poems for Singing) is a Japanese anthology of Chinese poems (漢詩, kanshi) and 31-syllable Japanese waka (短歌, tanka) for singing to fixed melodies (the melodies are now extinct).

The text was compiled by Fujiwara no Kintō c. 1013. It contains 588 Chinese poems by some 30 Chinese poets, including Bai Juyi (772－846), Yuan Zhen (779－831) and Xu Hun (fl. 850) together with some 50 Japanese poets of Chinese verse such as Sugawara no Michizane, Minamoto no Shitagau (911－983), Ōe no Asatsuna (886－957), Ki no Haseo (845－912), and others. The 216 waka poems in the collection are by 80 famous poets such as Kakinomoto no Hitomaro, Ki no Tsurayuki, Ōshikōchi Mitsune, among many other illustrious names.

Wakan rōeishū is divided into two books: "Seasonal poems" occupy the first book, while "Miscellanea" are in the second. The poems are further sub-classified by common topics (題, dai); kanshi alternate with waka on the same subject.

== Translation ==
Scholars J. Thomas Rimer and Jonathan Chaves published the first translation and study in any Western language (English) of this bilingual anthology under the title Japanese and Chinese Poems to Sing: The Wakan Rōei Shū (Columbia University Press, 1997). The translators received the Japan–U.S. Friendship Commission Prize for the Translation of Japanese Literature in 1998 for their work.

== See also ==
- Kimigayo, the national anthem of Japan, where the lyrics were derived from the 775th poem of this work.
