= Jokotoba =

Jokotoba (序詞), literally meaning "preface word", is a figure of speech found in discourse related to Japanese waka poetry. Jokotoba expressions are set before certain words, and make use of wordplay through similes, kakekotoba and homonyms.

== History and usage ==
The makurakotoba is closely related to the jokotoba as a figure of speech in Japanese waka poetry. The main differences are that jokotoba are not restricted by the number of syllables, and so have greater freedom in terms of length, and they do not have fixed objects which they modify, and so are more bountiful in terms of creativity. For these reasons, in comparison to makurakotoba, jokotoba can be seen to be more complex expressions in terms of content.

There are two types of jokotoba: ushin-no-jo (有心の序) and mushin-no-jo (無心の序). Ushin-no-jo connect or associate through semantic meaning, while mushin-no-jo connect or associate through phonetic pronunciation.

== Examples ==
The italics in the examples below indicate the entire jokotoba phrase.

=== An example of an ushin-no-jo ===
- 秋づけば尾花が上に置く露の 消ぬべくも吾は思ほゆるかも (Man'yōshū (MYS) Vol.8,1564)

aki dzukeba / obana ga ue ni / oku tsuyu no / kenubeku mo a wa / omo-oyuru kamo

This poem plays on the central position of the verb to disappear (消) as functioning both for the disappearing dew (露が消える) with the disappearing self (私も消える).

Translation: When it becomes fall the dew on the silver grass disappears, just so I might pine away in longing for you.

=== An example of a mushin-no-jo ===
- 風吹けば沖つ白波 たつた山夜半にや君がひとり越ゆらむ (from the Ise Monogatari, Episode 23)

kaze fukeba / okitsu shiranami / tatsuta yama / yowa ni ya kimi ga hitori koyuran

This poem plays on the verb to rise, "tatsu" (立つ), describing the rising surf (白波), with the imagined significant other's geographical location, the Mount Tatsuta (竜田山).

Translation: When the wind blows the high surf mounts the shore, as you must be crossing over Mount Tatsuta alone this night. (Note that the English wordplay is not the same as the Japanese wordplay, since Tatsuta means "dragon-field").

== See also ==
- Kakekotoba
- Makurakotoba
