= Zhang Ji (poet from Jiangnan) =

Zhang Ji (simplified Chinese: 张籍; traditional Chinese: 張籍; pinyin: Zhāng Jí; Wade–Giles: Chang Chi^{2}; c. 766 – c. 830), courtesy name Wenchang (文昌), was a Tang dynasty poet and scholar.

== Life ==
Zhang Ji was born around 766. He was a native of the Wu River area, in Jiangnan.

According to Herbert Giles, he was renowned as a scholar and poet, and he "was patronised by the great Han Yu, whom he even ventured to take to task for his fondness for dice. The latter in 815 recommended him for employment, and he rose to be a Tutor in the Imperial Academy. But it is by his poems that he is known; among which may be mentioned the exquisite lines under the title of 節婦吟. He was also a vigorous opponent of Buddhism and Taoism, both of which he held in much contempt. In one account, he was 80 years of age when he died."

He died around 830.

== Poetry ==
Zhang Ji had one of his poems included in the famous anthology Three Hundred Tang Poems, as poem #151, THINKING OF A FRIEND LOST IN THE TIBETAN WAR (according to Witter Bynner's translation).

American scholar Jonathan Chaves has published the first book in any Western language on Zhang Ji, Cloud Gate Song, using rhymed translations which track the rhyme schemes of the original texts. 300 of Zhang's poems are included.

== See also ==
- Simians (Chinese poetry)

== Works cited ==
- Ueki, Hisayuki; Uno, Naoto; Matsubara, Akira (1999). "Shijin to Shi no Shōgai (Chō Seki)". In Matsuura, Tomohisa (ed.). Kanshi no Jiten 漢詩の事典 (in Japanese). Tokyo: Taishūkan Shoten. p. 117. OCLC 41025662.
