= J. Thomas Rimer =

American scholar of Japanese literature and drama

John Thomas Rimer (born March 2, 1933) is an American scholar of Japanese literature and drama. He is a Professor Emeritus of Japanese Literature, Theatre, and Art at the University of Pittsburgh. He has served as the chief of the Asian Division of the Library of Congress.

Rimer has written about Classical Japanese literature, as well as modern Japanese drama, and has translated several works. He has written several works for a popular audience, and has been credited with making Japanese drama more accessible to Americans.

Rimer earned a PhD in Japanese Literature from Columbia University in 1971. Rimer and co-author Jonathan Chaves received the Japan–U.S. Friendship Commission Prize for the Translation of Japanese Literature in 1998 for their translation of the Wakan rōeishū titled Japanese and Chinese Poems to Sing: The Wakan Roei-shu.

Rimer is a son-in-law of Paul Mus (1902-1969), a Southeast Asia and Buddhism expert.
