= Jonathan Chaves =

American sinologist and professor (born 1943)

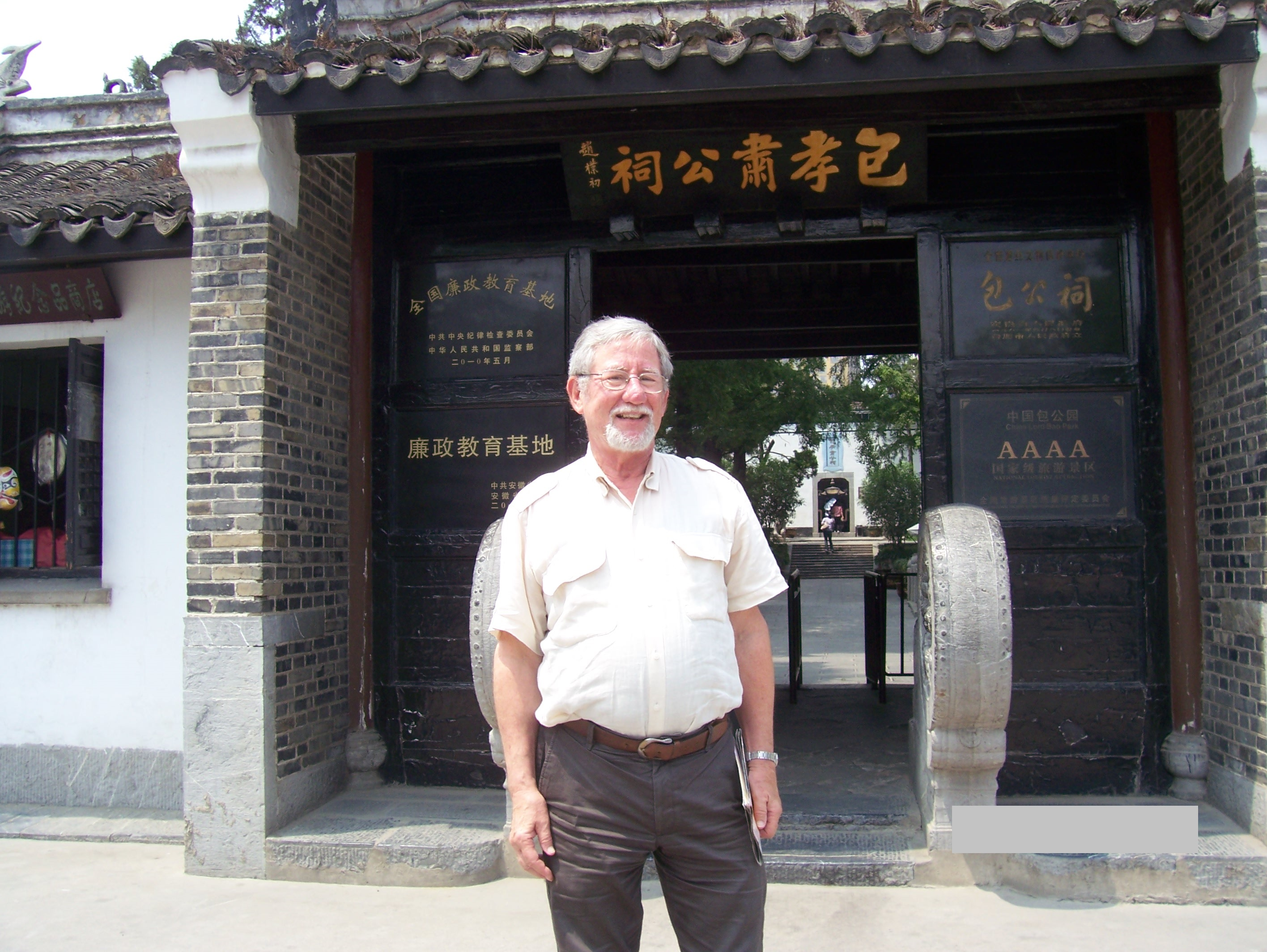
Chaves at the shrine of Judge Bao

Jonathan Chaves (born June 8, 1943) is an American sinologist and professor of Chinese language and literature at George Washington University in Washington, D.C. He is a translator of classical Chinese poetry.

== Early life and education ==
Chaves was born June 8, 1943. He earned his B.A. from Brooklyn College in 1965, an M.A. from Columbia University in 1966, and a PhD from Columbia in 1971.

== Translations ==
He published the first books in English or any Western language on such masters as Mei Yaochen 梅堯臣 (1002–60); Yang Wanli 楊萬里 (1127–1206); Yuan Hongdao 袁宏道 (1568–1610); the painter Wu Li 吳歷(1632–1718; as a poet); and Zhang Ji 張籍 (c.766-c.830). Eliot Weinberger, in his book 19 Ways of Looking at Wang Wei, cites Chaves among the 4 best scholar-translators of Chinese poetry in English, placing him with translators Burton Watson, A.C. Graham and Arthur Waley.

== Awards ==
He is the 2014 recipient of the American Literary Translators Association's Lucien Stryk Prize for his book Every Rock a Universe: The Yellow Mountains and Chinese Travel Writing. His book Pilgrim of the Clouds: Poems and Essays from Ming China by Yuan Hung-tao and His Brothers was a finalist for the National Book Award in the translation category in 1979. He and co-author J. Thomas Rimer won the 1998 Japan-U.S. Friendship Commission Prize for the Translation of Japanese Literature for their translation of the Wakan rōeishū titled Japanese and Chinese Poems to Sing: The Wakan Rōei Shū (Columbia University Press, 1997).

== Research ==
Chaves’ research has emphasized the relationship between poetry and painting in China, encompassing comparisons with Japanese and Western poetry and painting. He was invited to curate an exhibition on the interrelationships between painting, poetry and calligraphy at The China Institute in America (New York), which took place in 2000, and produced a catalog from that exhibit called The Chinese Painter as Poet.

Chaves also has published on Chinese-language poetry Kanshi in Japan. In 1997, he and J. Thomas Rimer published the first translation and study in any Western language (English) of the bilingual (Japanese and Chinese) anthology of the early 11th century, Japanese and Chinese Poems to Sing: The Wakan Rōei Shū (Columbia University Press, 1997). This won the 1998 Japan-U.S. Friendship Commission Prize for the Translation of Japanese Literature. In 2024 with Matthew Fraleigh as co-author he published " ''The Same Moon Shines on All: The Poetry and Lives of Yanagawa Seigan and Kōran " (Columbia University Press, 2024). This is the first in-depth presentation of major writers of Chinese-language poetry in Japan. It won Honorable Mention for the Modern Language Association's Aldo and Jeanne Scaglione Prize for a Translation of a Literary Work .

He has also published original poetry, both in modernist style and in neo-formalist metrical forms with rhyme, in such literary magazines as IRONWOOD, 19 (1982, pp. 134–135), THE GREENFIELD REVIEW (Vol. 11, 1 & 2 double issue, 1983, pp. 145–146), and CHRONICLES: A Magazine of American Culture (May, 2009, pp. 12, 26–27; September, 2015, p. 17; October, 2016, pp. 15 and 41; November, 2017, p. 24; June, 2019, pp. 20 and 41; July, 2020, pp. 22 and 42 ), ACADEMIC QUESTIONS, July, 2020 (three poems). In 2023 he published a book of his poems, "Surfing the Torrent," Eugene, OR: Wipf & Stock Resource Publications. A second followed in 2025, "Kites," from the same publisher.

== Selected translations ==
- "Every Rock a Universe: The Yellow Mountains and Chinese Travel Writing", Floating World Editions, 2013
- "West Cliff Poems: The Poetry of Weng Chüan", Ahadada Books, 2010
- "Cloud Gate Song: The Verse of Tang Poet Zhang Ji", Floating World Editions, 2006
- "Heaven My Blanket, Earth My Pillow: Poems from Sung Dynasty China by Yang Wan-li", Weatherhill, Tokyo, 1975. New edition, 2004

== Selected bibliography ==
- Chaves, J. (1975). Heaven My Blanket, Earth My Pillow: Poems from Sung-Dynasty China by Yang Wan-li. Tokyo: Weatherhill. ISBN 0834801035
- Chaves, J. (1976). Mei Yao-chʻen and the Development of Early Sung Poetry. New York: Columbia University Press. ISBN 9780231039659
- Chaves, J. (1978). Pilgrim of the Clouds: Poems and Essays from Ming-Dynasty China by Yüan Hung-tao and His Brothers. Tokyo: Weatherhill. ISBN 0834801345
- Chaves, J. (1986). The Columbia Book of Later Chinese Poetry: Yuan, Ming, and Qing Dynasties (1279–1911). New York: Columbia University Press. ISBN 9780231061483
- Chaves, J., J. Thomas Rimer, Stephen Addiss, and Hiroyuki Suzuki. (1991). Shisendō: Hall of the Poetry Immortals. New York and Tokyo: Weatherhill. ISBN 0834802414
- Chaves, J. (1993). Singing of the Source: Nature and God in the Poetry of the Chinese painter Wu Li. Honolulu: University of Hawaii Press. ISBN 9780585338170
- Chaves, J. and J. Thomas Rimer. (1997). Japanese and Chinese Poems to Sing: The Wakan Rōei Shū. New York, Columbia University Press. ISBN 0231107021
- Chaves, J. and Stephen Addiss. (2000). Old Taoist: The Life, Art and Poetry of Kodojin. New York, Columbia University Press. ISBN 9780231504003
- Chaves, J. (2000). The Chinese Painter as Poet. New York: China Institute Gallery, China Institute. ISBN 9780965427043
- Chaves, J. (2006). Cloud Gate Song: The Verse of Tang Poet Zhang Ji. Warren, CT: Floating World Editions. ISBN 978-1891640445
- Chaves, J. (2011). West Cliff Poems: The Poetry of Weng Chüan. Tokyo: Ahadada Books. ISBN 978-0981274461
- Chaves, J. (2013). Every Rock a Universe: The Yellow Mountains and Chinese Travel Writing. Warren, CT: Floating World Editions. ISBN 1891640704
- Chaves, J. (2017). Cave of the Immortals: The Poetry and Prose of Bamboo Painter Wen Tong (1019–1079). Warren, CT: Floating World Editions. ISBN 978-1-891640-90-2
- Chaves, J. (2023). What Painter Could Ever Capture This? Poetry of the Four Lings of Song China. Warren, CT: Floating World Editions.
- Chaves, J. (2023). Surfing the Torrent. Eugene, Oregon: Resource Publications. ORIGINAL POETRY by Jonathan Chaves.
- Chaves, J. and Matthew Fraleigh. (2024) The Same Moon Shines on All: The Lives and Selected Poems of Yanagawa Seigan and Kōran. New York: Columbia University Press.
