= Sakanoue no Mochiki =

Heian-period Japanese poet

Sakanoue no Mochiki (坂上望城; dates unknown, likely died around 975) was a Heian period waka poet and Japanese nobleman. He was the son of Sakanoue no Korenori, one of the Thirty-six Poetry Immortals.

As one of the Five Men of the Pear Chamber (梨壺の五人), he contributed to the compilation of the Gosen Wakashū. He also compiled kundoku (訓読) readings for texts from the Man'yōshū.
