= Seeds in the Heart =

Seeds in the Heart: Japanese Literature from Earliest Times to the Late Sixteenth Century
- First edition
- Author: Donald Keene
- Language: English
- Publisher: Henry Holt & Co.
- Publication date: 1995
- ISBN: 978-0-8050-4364-8

Seeds in the Heart: Japanese Literature from Earliest Times to the Late Sixteenth Century is the first book (though the last to be written and published) in Donald Keene's four-book series A History of Japanese Literature. It is followed by World Within Walls: Japanese Literature of the Pre-Modern Era, 1600–1867, Dawn to the West: Japanese Literature of the Modern Era; Fiction, and the last book in the series, Dawn to the West: Japanese Literature in the Modern Era; Poetry, Drama, Criticism. It covers classical prose works such as the Kojiki and the Tale of Genji and major waka poets like Fujiwara no Teika or Ki no Tsurayuki, through the Kamakura period and up to the beginnings of Noh plays and renga, in 1175 pages of text and endnotes (excluding the bibliography, index, and glossary).
