= Kakekotoba =

Rhetorical device in Japanese poetry

A kakekotoba (掛詞, 懸詞) or pivot word is a rhetorical device used in the Japanese poetic form waka. This trope uses the phonetic reading of a grouping of kanji (Chinese characters) to suggest several interpretations: first on the literal level (e.g. 松, matsu, meaning "pine tree"), then on subsidiary homophonic levels (e.g. 待つ, matsu, meaning "to wait"). Thus it is that many waka have pine trees waiting around for something. The presentation of multiple meanings inherent in a single word allows the poet a fuller range of artistic expression with an economical syllable-count. Such brevity is highly valued in Japanese aesthetics, where maximal meaning and reference are sought in a minimal number of syllables. Kakekotoba are generally written in the Japanese phonetic syllabary, hiragana, so that the ambiguous senses of the word are more immediately apparent.

== History ==
Pivot words are first found in the earliest extant manuscripts where poetic verse is preserved in written form. The earliest examples are from the Nara period. The provenance of the technique is unclear, however it is likely it was already in common use in the period before writing was introduced, as part of the oracular poetic tradition. It is a technique devised to enrich the way of conveying a poem in a limited space. The general pattern is as follows:

1. Using the context of the sentence before the kakekotoba and after it to create a new meaning.
2. The kakekotoba is translated to two different meanings by itself. Because it can be translated with different meanings, kakekotoba translations can sometimes be meaningless by themselves, and need a context to bring out their meaning, which was not considered a problem in the Heian period.

== Examples ==
Kokin Wakashū 571 Love 2

Koishiki ni
wabite tamashii
madoinaba
munashiki kara no
na ni ya nokoramu

— Anonymous
Translation:

If in despair of love
my soul should wander,
am I to be remembered
as one who left
(a corpse) in vain?

This poem from the Kokin Wakashū makes a pun that is translated explicitly in the English version. Kara, here can mean "empty shell" or "corpse" (since the implied narrator's soul has left his body). Spelling this out in translation is the only way to express the pun to an English reader, but doing so destroys the subtlety that makes the original so poignant.

Kokin Wakashū 639 (From a poetry contest/utaawase)

Akenu tote
kaeru michi ni wa
kokitarete
ame mo namida mo
furisohochitsutsu

— Fujiwara no Toshiyuki
Translation:

Dawn has come—
on the path home from love
I am drenched:
rainfall swelling
my falling tears

Although the mix-up of tears and rain is a bit trite in Japanese poetry, Toshiyuki creates a new beauty from old fragments through the unusual verb "kokitarete" (drenched) and the kakekotoba on "furisohochi" (meaning both "to fall" and "to soak through"). The kakekotoba is just one way through which poets are able to make unique and beautiful works of art despite working with a rather limited set of acceptable forms, styles, and references.

Chikuba Kyoginshu 227-228 Miscellaneous

Shukke no soba ni
netaru nyoubou
Henjou ni
kakusu Komachi ga
utamakura

— Unknown
Translation:

Beside the monk
lies a lady
Hidden from Henjou
is Komachi's
poem-pillow.

Though from a much later period (15th century), this poem utilizes a multi-layered play on the literary term utamakura ("poem-pillow"). An utamakura is a place-name that is described with set words and associated constantly with the same scenery, season, time of day, etc...; poets often kept notes of their favorite tropes of this sort. Two of the Six Poetic Immortals of the Kokin Wakashū era were the Priest Henjou and Ono no Komachi, who were reputed to be romantically involved despite their competition. The literary term utamakura is here being used for one of its literal constitutive words, "pillow," to imply that Henjou and Komachi were sleeping together. The poem is also referencing similar scenes in the Gosenshu and Yamato Monogatari. Kakekotoba, as this poem shows, are often humorous displays of the writer's wit.

In English a similar technique is sometimes employed in both poetic and prose language. One contemporary example is: "They say conversation rule the nation, I can tell, but I could never right my wrongs unless I write them down for real." -Kendrick Lamar (Poetic Justice)

This example only works when the line is heard, not read (because the spelling of the two words are distinct): "right a wrong" and "write a wrong." Conversely, this line would have to be rendered explicitly if it was translated into another language where the two words are not homophones.

Another contemporary example: "...they like 'go Forres[t], run Forres[t], run Forres[t], go Forres[t]', yeah I mean you already wrote for us... what's one more quote for us?" -Drake (0 to 100)

In this example, the pivot word is based on the vernacular pronunciation of the words "Forrest" and "for us" where Forrest (alluding to the name Forrest Gump) is pronounced with the final /t/ dropped and the /r/ in both words / phrases elides so that the preceding vowel is elongated, thus "forrest" > foos and "for us" > foos with only slight differentiation in stress, which is basically neutralized in the song. This example is highly complex in that it would require five phrases to be rendered twice each; e.g. "go Forrest" and "go for us" etc., and the final line, which reveals the play on words, "what's one more quote for us?" and "what's one more quote Forrest?"

Both these and the majority of Japanese kakekotoba are highly dependent on vocal recitation, not writing.

== See also ==
- Garden path sentence
- Paronomasia
