= Kiyohara no Motosuke =

Japanese nobleman and poet

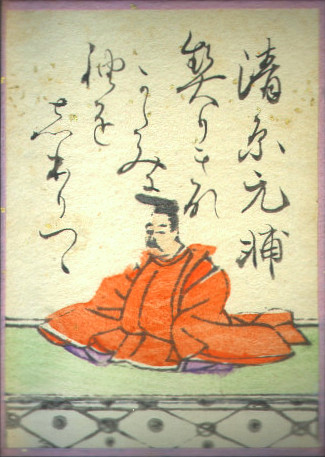
Kiyohara no Motosuke, from the Ogura Hyakunin Isshu.

Kiyohara no Motosuke (清原 元輔; 908 – June 990) was a Heian period waka poet and Japanese nobleman. His daughter was the Heian poet and author Sei Shōnagon, famous today for writing The Pillow Book. He is designated a member of the Thirty-six Poetry Immortals, and one of his poems is included in the famous Ogura Hyakunin Isshu. His court career included terms as governor of Kawachi Province and Higo Province.

As one of the Five Men of the Pear Chamber (梨壺の五人), Kiyohara no Motosuke assisted in the compilation of the Gosen Wakashū. This group also compiled kundoku (訓読) readings for texts from the Man'yōshū.

His poems are included in several official poetry anthologies, including the Shūi Wakashū. A personal collection known as the Motosukeshū (元輔集) also remains.
