= Bussokuseki-kahi =

Buddhist monument

The Bussokuseki-kahi (仏足石歌碑) is a well-known monument in the Yakushi Temple in Nara, consisting of a traditional Buddha footprint inscribed with twenty-one poems, known as bussokusekika (also known as Bussokuseki no Uta). The monument was constructed in 753 CE and the poems are viewed as being composed around that time. The author is unknown.

Numbering twenty one poems in total, they are divided into two sections:

- Seventeen poems praising the virtue of Buddha.
- Four poems warning against the impermanence of life and preaching the Buddhist path.

Part of the stone monument has worn away making the eleventh poem of the first section and the fourth poem of the second section partially unreadable.

The poems are written in Man'yōgana, a precursor to kana where Chinese characters are used for their phonetic value, and in Bussokuseki-style. Named after the poems, Bussokuseki-style (仏足石歌体, Bussokuseki-katai) is an archaic poetic device in which lines are written in a 5-7-5-7-7-7 mora pattern. It is seen during the Nara period but greatly diminishes by the Heian period. It is an early form of waka.

The poems are a valuable inscriptional witness to Old Japanese, otherwise mainly known through later copies of 8th-century manuscripts.

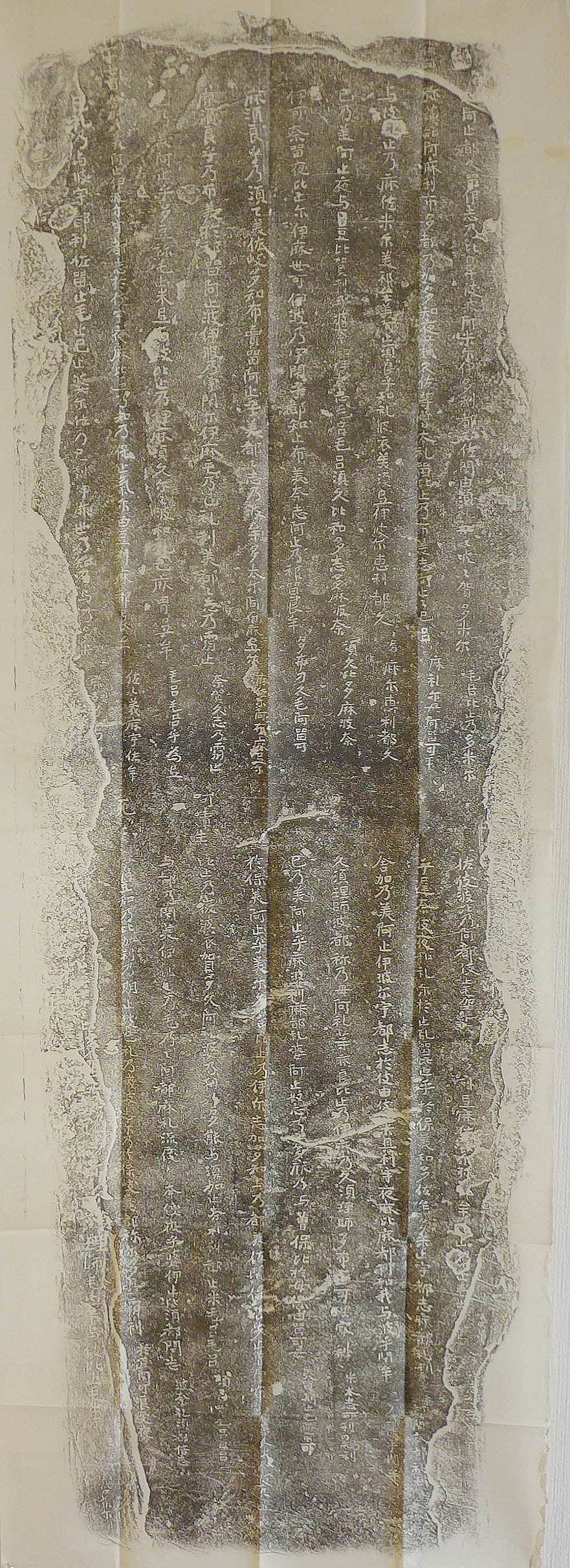
Rubbing of Bussokuseki-kahi

== See also ==
- Buddhist poetry
