= Honkadori =

In Japanese poetry, honkadori (本歌取り) is an allusion within a poem to an older poem which would be generally recognized by its potential readers. Honkadori possesses qualities of yūgen and ushin (有心) in Japanese art. The concept emerged in the 12th century during the Kamakura period. Honkadori is one of several terms in Japanese poetry used to describe allusion, another being honzetsu (本説).

== Context ==
This style of quoting is a common trope in many ancient Japanese works of literature including stories such as the Tale of Genji and poems such as those found in the Kokinshū and the Shin Kokinshū.

In a narrative story, honkadori are often found in the form of a poem spoken by one of the characters. In a waka poem, this is usually the first line of the poem. Honkadori is not merely a reference to another poem even though lines are sometimes copied word for word. The use of honkadori attempts to affect the reader in the same way as the original poem, the only difference being in the meaning and atmosphere. Debates occur while interpreting poems over the difference between honkadori and seishi (lines from poetry which have already been used and are not allowed to be repeated.

== Use in uta-awase ==
Because poetry in Japan was often written for utaawase, or poetry competitions, a “good” poem was not merely one that expressed emotions in a unique and beautiful way. Rather, poets were judged on their mastery of using their knowledge of existing poems and the way in which they placed honkadori and other poetic tropes into their poems. In this way, the use of honkadori added depth to the poem because the poet displayed his mastery of Japanese poetic tropes, signifying a mastery of Japanese poetry.

== Fujiwara no Teika and his interpretation ==
Among Japanese poets, Fujiwara no Teika defined the use of honkadori. His specific interpretation of honkadori was limited to a selective audience of aristocrats and members of the Japanese court who were well versed in all Japanese poetry and tropes. Therefore, for Fujiwara no Teika the context and use of honkadori were dependent on the reader. The skilful use of honkadori is then found in the balance between not being plagiarism, and still evoking the context of the original poem.

== Sources ==
- Brower, Robert H. Fujiwara Teika's Hundred-Poem Sequence of the Shoji Era, Monumenta Nipponica, Vol. 31, No. 3. (Autumn, 1976) pp. 223–249
- Shirane, Haruo, ed. (2007). Traditional Japanese Literature: An Anthology, Beginnings to 1600. New York: Columbia University Press. pp. 612, 621. ISBN 978-0-231-13697-6.
