= Ki no Tokibumi =

Japanese waka poet (922–996)

Ki no Tokibumi (紀 時文; 922–996) was a Japanese waka poet and nobleman of the Heian period. As one of the Five Men of the Pear Chamber (梨壺の五人), he assisted in the compilation of the Gosen Wakashū poetry anthology. He also compiled 訓読 (kundoku) readings for texts from the Man'yōshū.
