= Utamakura =

Rhetorical concept in Japanese poetry

Utamakura (歌枕, "poem pillow") is a rhetorical concept in Japanese poetry.

== Definition ==
Utamakura is a category of poetic words, often involving place names, that allow for greater allusions and intertextuality across Japanese poems.

Utamakura enables poets to express ideas and themes concisely—thus allowing them to stay in the confines of strict waka structures.

Some scholars see the use of geographical allusion as the evidence for a restricted scope of poetry writing. Although the poets' "true" meaning was true because the essence was initially pre-established, the poems were written within fixed topics (dai). The poet could inhabit a subjective position or persona and write about the topic, but not necessarily about their personal feelings; therefore, utamakura could have restrained the scope of topics a poet could write about.

Utamakura include locations familiar to the court of ancient Japan, such as:

- particularly sacred Shinto and Buddhist sites,
- places where historic events occurred, and
- places that trigger a separate mental association through a pun.

== Aesthetic function ==
Utamakura serve as a significant tool to achieve yugen (mystery and depth) in Japanese poetry by adding profound and indirect beauty in poems. It can be used as a source for identifying significant figures and places in ancient Japan.

== History ==
The history of utamakura is found in documents on the study of poetry such as the Utamakura of Noin, by the poet and monk of the late Heian period, and lists of places in the Utamakura Nayose (Utamakura reference book).

Utamakura were first used by traveling priests. They collected stories from the towns they traveled to. Since they saw many places, it was easier to remember the details of a story by using a single, consistent reference point for each recurring event in their tales. Over time, the people across the Japan came to identify utamakura place names by the psychological feelings associated with the references made by the wandering priests.

After utamakura place names and people had become well established, eager waka poets went sightseeing to the sites of utamakura. Beyond becoming familiar with the scenery of the poems, entering the locale of a poem or story deepened one's understanding of it.

Utamakura was also used in renga, a form of Japanese collaborative poetry that is the ancestor of renku and haiku poetry.

== Examples ==
There are numerous instances of utamakura in Japanese literature, one of which is the Kokinshū. The source of this particular utamakura example is poem #3 in the "Spring" section.

harugasumi
tateru ya izuko
Miyoshino no
Yoshino no yama ni
yuki wa furitsutsu

—Anonymous

Where are the promised
mists of spring?
In Yoshino, fair hills
of Yoshino, snow
falling still

—Translated by Lewis Cook

In the poem above, Yoshino refers to a place in the Yamato region in the nearby of the capital. Yoshino is known for having both heavy snowfall and an abundance of cherry blossoms.

Poem #1 in "Spring 1" of Shin Kokin Wakashū also uses Yoshino for depicting the beginning of spring.

Miyoshino wa
yama mo kasumite
shirayuki no
furinishi sato ni
haru wa kinikeri

—The Regent Prime Minister
(Kujō Yoshitsune)

Fair Yoshino, mountains
now wrapped in mist:
to the village where snow
was falling
spring has come.

—Translated by Lewis Cook

Another instance of poetic place name comes from Tales of Ise, a piece titled "In the Provinces" (#15).

Shinobuyama
shinobite kayou
michi mogana
hito no kokoro no
oku no miru beku

I long to find a path
to the depths of Mount Shinobu
that I might fathom
the secrets
of another's heart.

—Translated by Jamie Newhard
and Lewis Cook

Mount Shinobu is a pun on the verb shinobu, meaning "to conceal," "endure," "long for," and "remember".

=== Contemporary examples ===
Utamakura are also used outside of poetry, for example menu items named after their visual appearance with a reference to a well-known Japanese scenic area. Tatsuta age, deep-fried fish or chicken that has a dark reddish-brown color as a result of being marinated in soy sauce, is named after the Tatsuta River, known for its maple trees, the leaves of which turn a deep red color in autumn.

== See also ==
- Darmok – episode of Star Trek: The Next Generation (S5 E2)
