= Honchō Monzui =

Honchō Monzui (本朝文粋, Japanese pronunciation: [hoɲ.tɕoː moꜜn.dzɯi]) is a Japanese book of Chinese prose and poetry. It was compiled around the middle of the 11th century during the Heian period by Fujiwara no Akihira.

== Composition ==
Honchō Monzui is 14 volumes in length and contains 432 entries from 69 people over a period of approximately 240 years. The purpose of the work was to create a model and reference for writers. Entries are divided into 39 sections. Divisions are based on Chinese Wén Xuǎn (文選) in which the two share 12 sections. During compilation, Akihira referenced many works, including Fusōshū, Toshi Bunshū (都氏文集), and Ryō no Gige (令義解).

== Title ==
The word honchō means Japan and is used in opposition to China. When prefixed before a title, it expresses that something is a Japanese version based on a Chinese original. Honchō Monzui is modeled after Yáo Xuàn's (姚鉉) Táng Wén Cuì (唐文粋). (The Japanese reading of this title is Tō Monzui.)

The oldest reference to this book is found in an entry in Taiki (台記) (1150) in which it is referred to as "Monzui". While this shorter title can be found in several other works, it appears in Honchō Shojaku Mokuroku' (本朝書籍目録) as "Honchō Monzui" which is believed to have been the official title.

In place of "monzui", the reading "bunsui" is found in Genchū Saihishō (原中最秘抄) and Ikyōshū (伊京集). However, the commonly accepted reading is "monzui".

== Influence ==
Honchō Monzui had wide range of influence on later literature. The classification system is seen works such as Honchō Zoku Monzui (本朝続文粋). It is often quoted in composition references such as Sakumon Daitai (作文大体) and used as a model for writing.
