= Fujiwara no Sukeyo =

Fujiwara no Sukeyo (藤原佐世; 847 – 14 November 897) was an early medieval Japanese aristocrat and scholar best known for his compilation of List of Writings Currently Held in the Nation of Japan (Nihon-koku genzai shomokuroku 日本国見在書目録).

== Catalogue ==
Fujiwara Sukeyo’s catalogue includes an entry for Han Feizi political commentary five juan 韓子十政論五卷, under Fajia.
