= Gotoh Museum =

Art museum in Japan

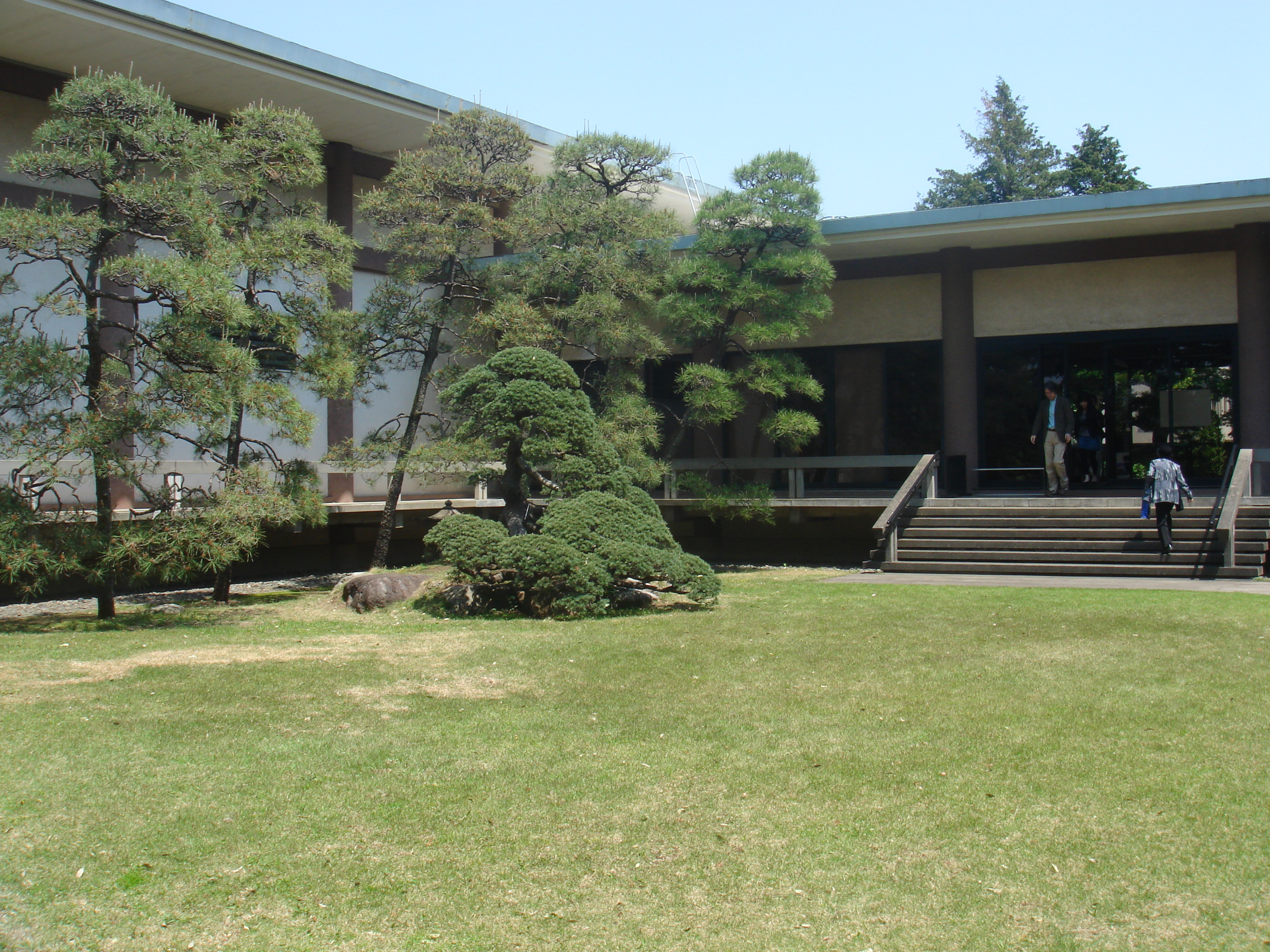
- Gotoh Museum from the garden side

- Location within Japan
- Established: 1960
- Location: 3-9-25 Kaminoge, Setagaya, Tokyo 158-8510, Japan
- Coordinates: 35.612195°N 139.635294°E
- Type: Art museum
- Public transit access: Kami-noge Station
- Website: gotoh-museum.or.jp

The Gotoh Museum (五島美術館, Gotō Bijutsukan) is a private museum in the Kaminoge district of Setagaya on the southwest periphery of Tokyo, Japan. It was opened in 1960, displaying the private collection of Keita Gotō, chairman of the Tokyu Group. Today's collection is centered on the original selection of classical Japanese and Chinese art, such as paintings, writings, crafts, and archaeological objects, completed by a small selection of Korean art. It features several objects designated as National Treasures or Important Cultural Properties. The exhibition changes several times each year with special openings in spring and fall.

The museum also comprises a garden with a tea house, ponds, and Buddhist statues.

== Highlights of the collection ==
=== Genji Monogatari Emaki ===
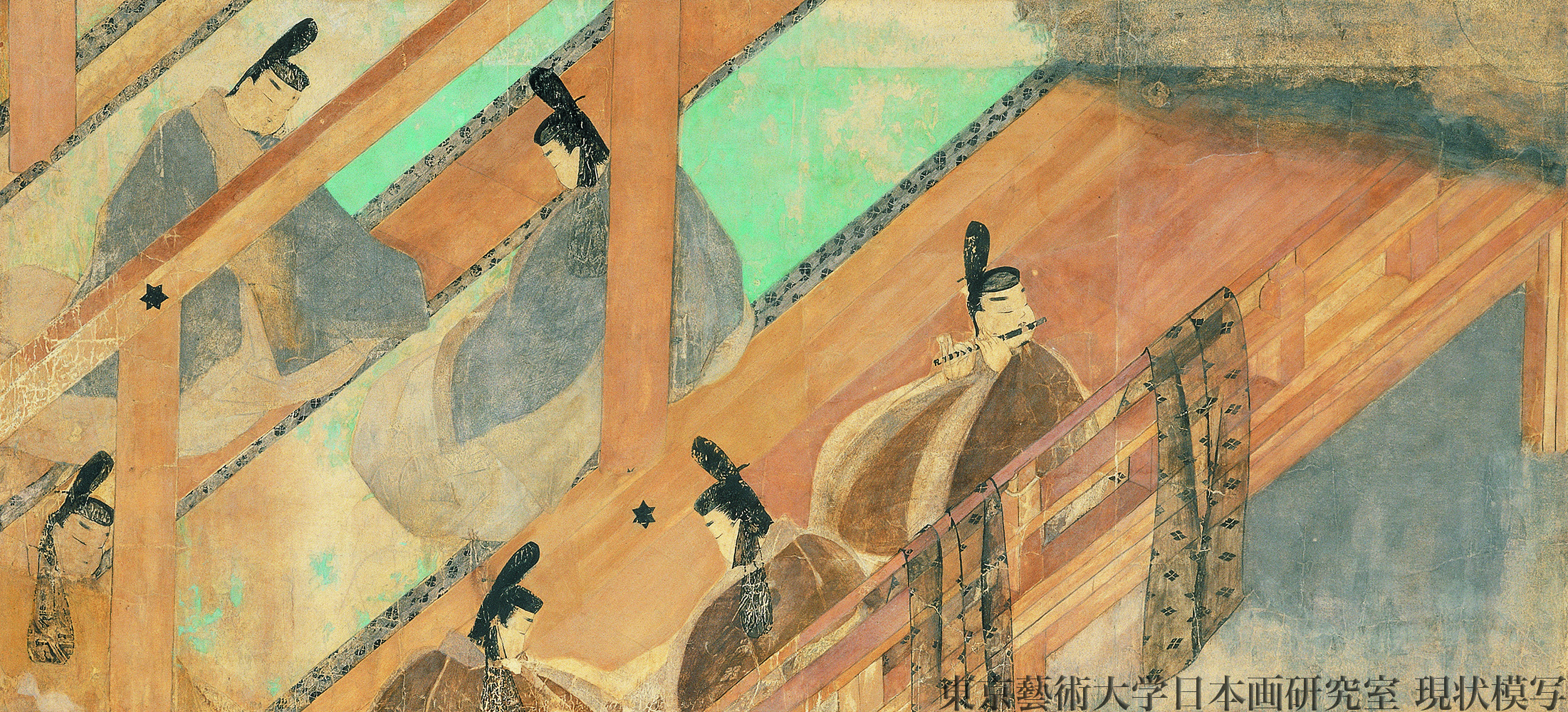
Scene from The Tale of Genji, in the collection of the Gotoh Museum

Some of the most important items housed in the museum are sections of the oldest extant illustrated handscroll of The Tale of Genji dating to the 12th century. This Genji Monogatari Emaki used to be the property of the Hachisuka family. The fragments cover chapters 38 (The Bell Cricket (鈴虫, suzumushi)), 39 (Evening Mist (夕霧, yūgiri)) and 40 (Rites (御法, minori)) of the novel.

- The Bell Cricket 1: one illustration (third princess with maid and hem of Genji's robe), two pages of text
- The Bell Cricket 2: one illustration (conversation between Reizei and Genji at an informal concert), two pages of text
- Evening Mist: one illustration (jealous Kumoi no kari is trying to snatch away a letter from her husband Yūgiri, who is Genji's son), two pages of text
- Rites: one illustration (exchange of poems between Genji, the dying Murasaki, and Empress Akashi, her adopted daughter), three pages of text

The fragments are very fragile and are listed as National Treasure. They are displayed in the Gotoh Museum every year for about a week in April/May around the Golden Week holidays. More scrolls are housed in the Tokugawa Art Museum in Nagoya.

=== Murasaki Shikibu Diary Emaki ===
Another important item and National Treasure of the museum collection is a set of 13th-century fragments from a handscroll of the Murasaki Shikibu Diary with illustrations. Three illustrations and three pages of text are housed in the museum. The items are displayed in the Gotoh Museum every year for about a week in autumn. More fragments are housed in the Fujita Art Museum in Osaka.

== Publications ==
The museum has published a number of books about its collection and special exhibitions, including the following:

- Masterpieces of Ink Painting from the Okayama Prefectural Museum of Art (1997)
- Genre Painting and Woodblock Prints: Masterpieces from the MOA Museum of Art, A Travelling exhibition celebrating the museum’s 15th anniversary (1997)
- Selected Works from the Gotoh Museum: Paintings and Calligraphy (1998)
- In the Eyes of Taste: Mukozuke Dishes for the Cuisine of Tea (2009)
- The 50th Anniversary Exhibition: The Illustrated Handscroll of the Tale of Genji (2010)
- Chasing Crazy Clouds: Person and Persona in the Art of IKKYU (2015)
- Jeweled Odyssey: Foundation and florescence in the Asian Enamel Arts (2017)
- The Beauty Between: East Asian Arts in an Age of Transformation, 16th-17th Centuries (2019)
- From Clay to Crystal: Masterworks of Ceramics and Glass from the Machida City Museum (2021)

== See also ==
- List of National Treasures of Japan (archaeological materials)
- List of National Treasures of Japan (paintings)
- List of National Treasures of Japan (writings)

== Bibliography ==
- "The Gotoh Museum" (homepage) (in Japanese).
- Mary Neighbour Parent (2001). "JAANUS – Japanese Architecture and Art Net Users System". Japanese Architectural and Art Historical Terminology (online ed.).
