= Fusōshū =

The Fusōshū (扶桑集) was a mid-Heian period Japanese text of kanshi. It was compiled by Ki no Tadana between 995 and 999, just shortly before the start of the 11th century.

== Contents ==
While originally sixteen volumes in length, only volumes seven and nine currently remain. Much of contents from the lost volumes may be inferred from other sources: a complete list of the poets may be found in Nichūreki, and annotations in Kanke Bunsō indicate the structural organization.

The collected poems span roughly 170 years. The surviving volumes contain 102 sections written by 24 people.
