= Rashōmon no oni =

Japanese legendary creature

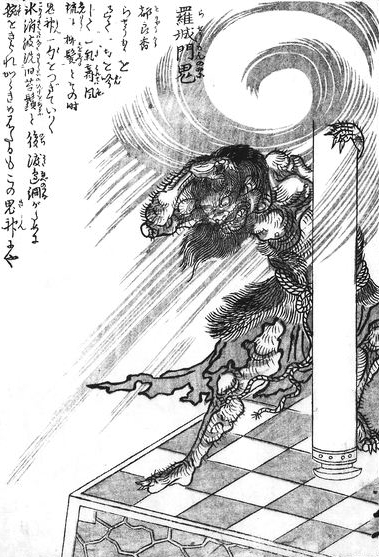
Rashōmon no Oni (羅城門鬼) from the Konjaku Hyakki Shūi by Toriyama Sekien

Rashōmon no oni (羅城門の鬼 or 羅生門の鬼) is an oni said to have nested at the front gate of Heian-kyō, Rashōmon. It appears in the Heian period yōkyoku, Rashōmon among other works.

== Concept ==
After Minamoto no Yorimitsu slew Shuten-dōji, as he was holding a banquet in his own residence with the Yorimitsu Shitennō and Hirai Yasumasa, Hirai (or one of the Shitennō, Urabe no Suetake) mentioned that there was an oni at Rashōmon. One of the Shitennō, Watanabe no Tsuna, said there was no logical basis for an oni to dwell on royal grounds, so in order to go check, he armed himself with armor, a helmet, and his ancestral tachi and rode out on a horse all by himself to Rashōmon without any accompany followers.

Upon coming to the main road Kujō-doori with the front side of Rashōmon coming into view, there was a gust of sudden wind, and the horse stopped moving. As Tsuna disembarked from his horse and headed towards Rashōmon, an oni appeared from behind him and caught his helmet. Tsuna cut at it with his tachi without delay, but his helmet was stolen. Tsuna's tachi and the oni's iron rod clashed violent, until finally, Tsuna cut off one of the oni's arm.

In The Tale of the Heike, Tsurugi no Maki, the story about the oni at Itijō Modoribashi happens at a bridge called Ichijō Modoribashi, and afterward, the oni disguised itself as Tsuna's mother and stole the arm. In the yōkyoku Rashōmon is considered to be based on The Tale of the Heike of everything up until the battle between Tsuna and the oni with the setting changed from Ichijō Modoribashi to Rashōmon, and the oni's retaliation story was then put in a separate yōkyoku from Rashōmon, called Ibaraki (茨木). Because of this, the different oni, the oni of Rashōmon, is often viewed to be the same as Ibaraki-dōji.

== See also ==
- List of legendary creatures from Japan
