= Minamoto no Shitagō =

Japanese poet

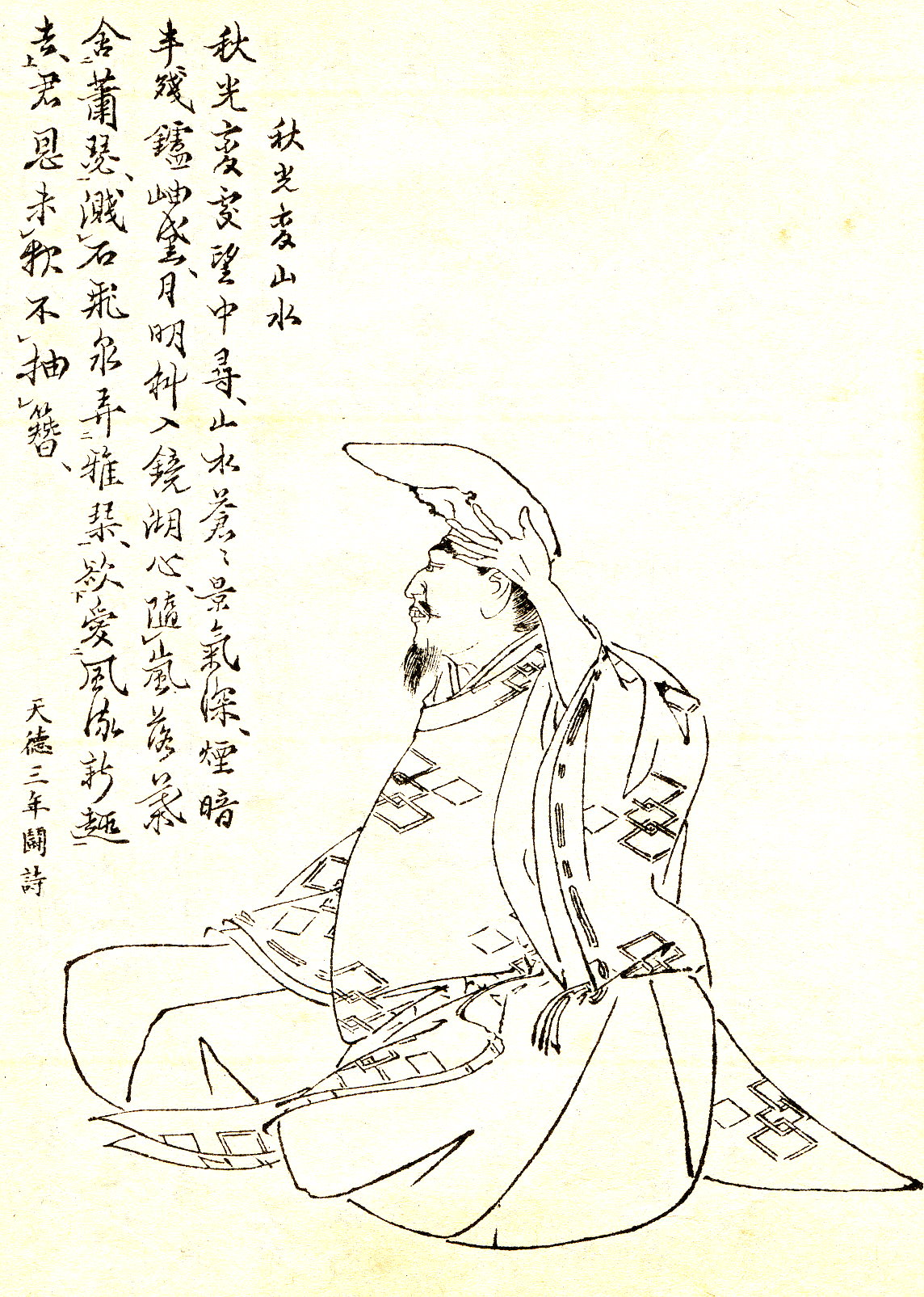
Minamoto no Shitagō by Kikuchi Yōsai

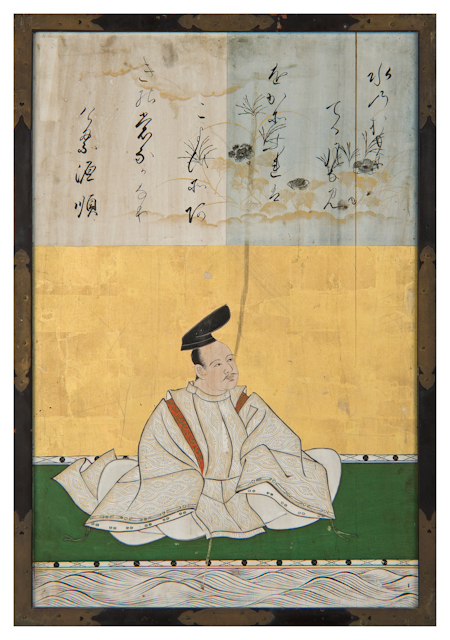
Minamoto no Shitagō by Kanō Yasunobu, 1648

Minamoto no Shitagō (源 順; 911–983) was a mid Heian waka poet, scholar and nobleman. He was also a male-line descendant of Emperor Saga. He was the original compiler of the Wamyō Ruijushō, the first Japanese dictionary organized into semantic headings. He was designated as one of the Thirty-six Poetry Immortals for his distinguished poetic accomplishments. In addition to the Wamyō Ruijushō, his remaining works include a poetry collection known as the Minamoto no Shitagōshū (源順集). Some scholars claim that he is the author of the Taketori Monogatari (Tale of the Bamboo Cutter). Ziro Uraki also posits him as a possible author of Utsuho Monogatari (Tale of the Hollow Tree) in the foreword to his English translation of that work.

As one of the Five Men of the Pear Chamber he assisted in the compilation of the waka anthology Gosen Wakashū. He also compiled kun'yomi readings for texts from the revered Man'yōshū anthology.
