= Gosen Wakashū =

2nd anthology of Japanese waka poetry (compiled 951)

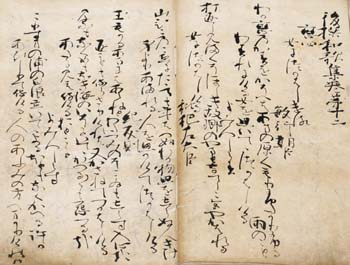
Gosen Wakashū. Fragment of the "Tenpuku 2" manuscript written by Fujiwara no Teika

The Gosen Wakashū (後撰和歌集, Later Collection of Japanese Poems), often abbreviated as Gosenshū ("Later Collection"), is the second imperial anthology of Japanese waka compiled in 951 at the behest of Emperor Murakami by the Five Men of the Pear Chamber: Ōnakatomi no Yoshinobu (922-991), Kiyohara no Motosuke (908-990), Minamoto no Shitagō (911-983), Ki no Tokibumi (flourished ~950), and Sakanoue no Mochiki (flourished ~950). It consists of twenty volumes containing 1,426 poems.

The collection has no preface and there are no contemporary writings that explain the compilers' intentions, nor is there any evidence that it was formally presented to the Emperor. In comparison to the Kokin Wakashū which preceded it, the Gosenshū focuses more on private poems, particularly poetry exchanges. It has a large number of poems that seem more like fictional poem tales, and even the poems by named authors frequently have long prose prefaces.
