= Five Men of the Pear Chamber =

Group of Heian-period Japanese poets and scholars

The Five Men of the Pear Chamber (梨壺の五人, Nashitsubo no gonin) are a group of Heian period (794–1185) Japanese poets and scholars who cooperated in the compilation of the Gosen Wakashū. They also compiled kundoku (訓読) readings for texts from the Man'yōshū. The group was composed of the following men:

- Ōnakatomi no Yoshinobu (大中臣能宣, (921-991)
- Minamoto no Shitagō (源順, 911-983)
- Kiyohara no Motosuke (清原元輔, 908-990)
- Sakanoue no Mochiki (坂上望城, dates unknown)
- Ki no Tokibumi (紀時文, 922-996)
