= Ki no Tsurayuki =

Japanese writer

Ki no Tsurayuki 紀 貫之
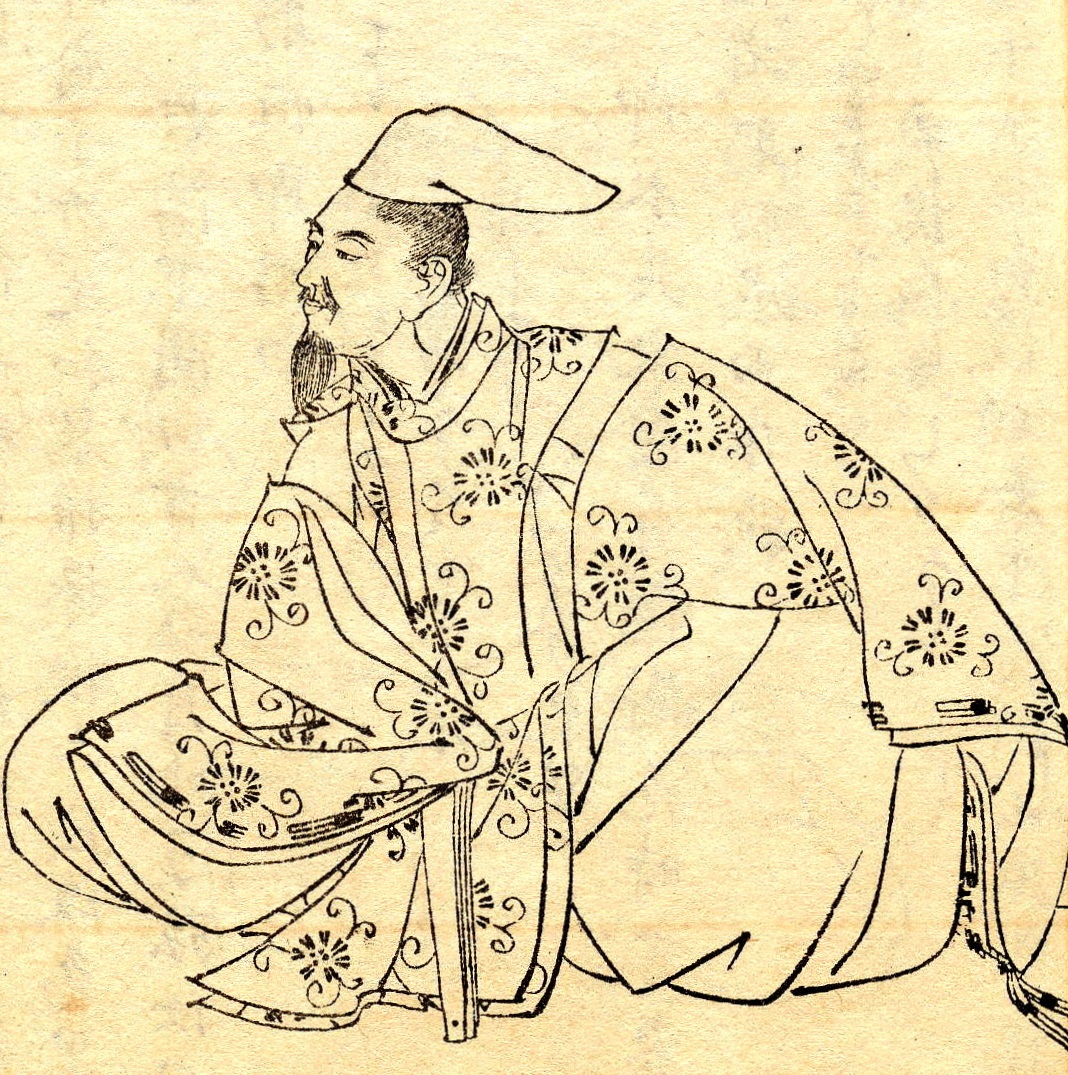
- Ki no Tsurayuki by Kikuchi Yōsai

Governor of Tosa Province
- In office 930–935
- Monarch: Suzaku

Vice Governor of Kaga Province
- In office 917–923
- Monarch: Daigo

Vice Governor of Mino Province
- In office 918–923
- Monarch: Daigo

Personal details
- Born: 872
- Died: June 30, 945 (aged 72-73)
- Children: Ki no Tokibumi; Ki no Naishi; and 1 other daughter
- Parent: Ki no Mochiyuki (father)

Ki no Tsurayuki (紀 貫之; Japanese pronunciation: [kʲiꜜ no | tsɯ.ɾaꜜ.jɯ.kʲi, kʲi no tsɯ.ɾaꜜ.jɯ.kʲi], 872 – June 30, 945) was a Japanese author, poet and court noble of the Heian period. He is best known as the principal compiler of the Kokin Wakashū, also writing its Japanese Preface, and as a possible author of the Tosa Diary, although this was published anonymously. He is well known for his waka poetry and is counted as one of the Thirty-six Poetry Immortals selected by Fujiwara no Kintō; his poetry was included also in the Hyakunin Isshu. As a courtier, he served as Governor of Tosa (930–935), Vice Governor of Kaga (917–923) and Vice Governor of Mino Province (918–923).

== Biography ==
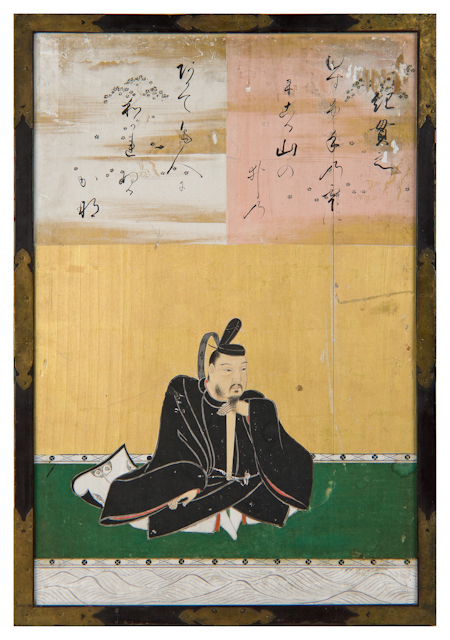
Ki no Tsurayuki by Kanō Tan'yū, 1648

Tsurayuki was born in either 866 or 872, the son of Ki no Mochiyuki and a court dancer of the naikyoubou (内教坊), whose name is unknown. He had the childhood name of Akokuso (阿古久曽).

In the 890s he became a poet of waka, short poems composed in Japanese. In 905, under the order of Emperor Daigo, he was one of four poets selected to compile the Kokin Wakashū (Kokinshu), the first imperially-sponsored anthology (chokusen-shū) of waka poetry.

After holding a few offices in Kyoto, he was appointed governor of Tosa Province and stayed there from 930 until 935. Later he was presumably appointed governor of Suō Province, since it was recorded that he held a waka party (Utaai) at his home in Suo.

He was one of the editors of the Kokin Wakashū. Tsurayuki wrote one of two prefaces to Kokin Wakashū; the other is in Chinese. His preface was the first critical essay on waka. He wrote of its history from its mythological origin to his contemporary waka, which he grouped into genres, referred to some major poets and gave a bit of harsh criticism to his predecessors like Ariwara no Narihira.

Tsurayuki composed well over 500 poems throughout his life, including those included in the Kokinshu, imperial collections, and personal collections. One of his waka was included in the Hyakunin Isshu, which was compiled in the 13th century by Fujiwara no Teika.

His death is recorded in the Sanjurokunin kasenden (三十六人歌仙伝) as potentially being May 18, 945, but it is also reported as being on June 30 of the same year.

== Works ==
=== Kokin Wakashu ===
In 905, under the order of Emperor Daigo, Ki no Tsurayuki was one of four poets selected to compile the Kokin Wakashū (Kokinshū), the first imperially-sponsored anthology (chokusenshū) of waka. Tsurayuki was the chief editor of the Kokinshu, and was the author of its Japanese preface (Kokin Wakashū).

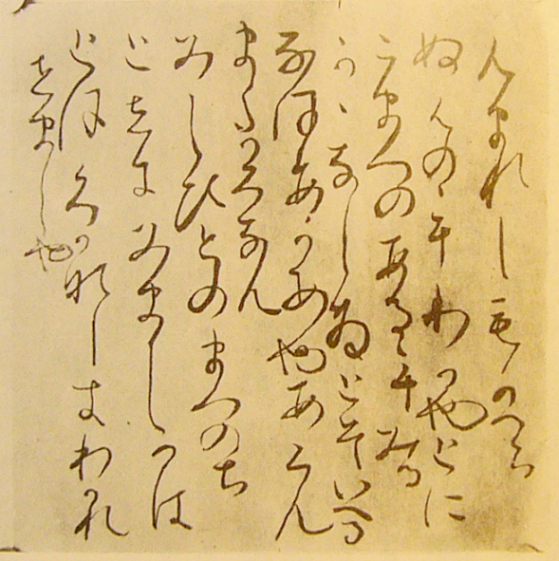
Tosa Nikki faithfully copied by Fujiwara no Teika (1162–1241) (Museum of the Imperial Collections)

=== Tosa Nikki ===
In addition to the Kokinshu, Tsurayuki's supposed major literary work (though it was published anonymously) was the Tosa Nikki (土佐日記, "Tosa Diary"), which was written using kana. The Tosa Diary is written from the perspective of a woman who embarks on a 55-day trip in 934 to the capital (present day Kyoto), where Tsurayuki had been the provincial governor, from her home in the Tosa Province. The female perspective of the diary, though written by a man (Tsurayuki), has sparked debate among scholars regarding gender and social status within the realm of linguistics of the time period. Ki no Tsurayuki left the Tosa Province at the age of 66 in 934 after completing his term as Provincial Governor and wrote the Tosa Nikki after returning to the capital. There are quite a few references within the diary that allude to events that took place in Ki no Tsurayuki's life, including the death of his daughter. It also includes many poems, presumably written by Tsurayuki.

=== Tale of Genji ===
In the Tale of Genji, Tsurayuki is referred to as a waka master, and it is stated that the Emperor Uda ordered him and a number of female poets to write waka on panels as accessories for his palace.

== Family ==
The names of Ki no Tsurayuki's mother and wife are unknown; names of women were rarely recorded during the Heian Period. He had three children; a son, Ki no Tokibumi; a daughter, Ki no Naishi; and a daughter whose name is unknown.

== Official timeline ==
The official timeline of Ki no Tsurayuki is documented in Sanjurokunin kasenden (三十六人歌仙伝), which documents the life of the Thirty-Six Immortals of Poetry, as follows.

- Born in either 866 or 872.
- April 18, 905: Wrote the Kokin Wakashū.
- February 906: Appointed Junior Secretary (少掾, shoujou) of Echizen Province and Keeper of the Library of the Imperial Court (御書所預 Goshodokoro-azukari).
- February 27, 907: Appointed Head of Imperial Table Office (内膳司, naizen-shi).
- September 907: Accompanied Emperor Uda on an imperial visit to Ōi River to perform waka poetry.
- February 910: Appointed Junior Scribe (少内記, Shounaiki) in the Ministry of the Center.
- March 13, 913: Participated in the Uda Waka Poetry Competition (亭子院歌合, Teijin Uta-awase) organized by Emperor Uda. April: Appointed Chief Scribe (大内記, Dainaiki) in the Ministry of the center.
- January 7, 917: Received the court rank of Junior Fifth Rank, Lower Grade (従五位下, Juugoi-no-ge).
- January 917: Appointed Vice Governor of Kaga Province (加賀介, Kaga-no-suke).
- February 918: Appointed simultaneously Vice Governor of Mino Province (美濃介, Mino-no-suke).
- June 923: Appointed Head of Storage (大監物, Daikenmotsu) in the Ministry of the center.
- September 929: Appointed Deputy High Steward of the Right Capital District (右京亮, Ukyou-no-suke).
- January 930: Appointed Governor of Tosa Province (土佐守, Tosa-no-kami). Compiled the Shinsen Waka (新撰和歌), a personal collection of waka poetry, by the command of Emperor Daigo.
- February 935: Finished his term as Governor of Tosa Province, and returned to Kyoto. Wrote the Tosa Nikki based on his travel diary from this trip.
- March 940: Appointed Head of the Bureau of Buddhists and Foreigners (玄蕃頭, Genba-no-kami).
- January 7 943: Received the court rank of Junior Fifth Rank, Upper Grade (従五位上, Juugoi-no-jou).
- March 28, 945: Appointed Head of the Bureau of Carpentry (木工権頭, Moku-no-gon-no-kami).
- May 18?: Died.
- March 18, 1904: Posthumously awarded the court rank of Junior Second Rank (従二位, Juunii).
