= Waka (poetry) =

Type of classical Japanese poetry

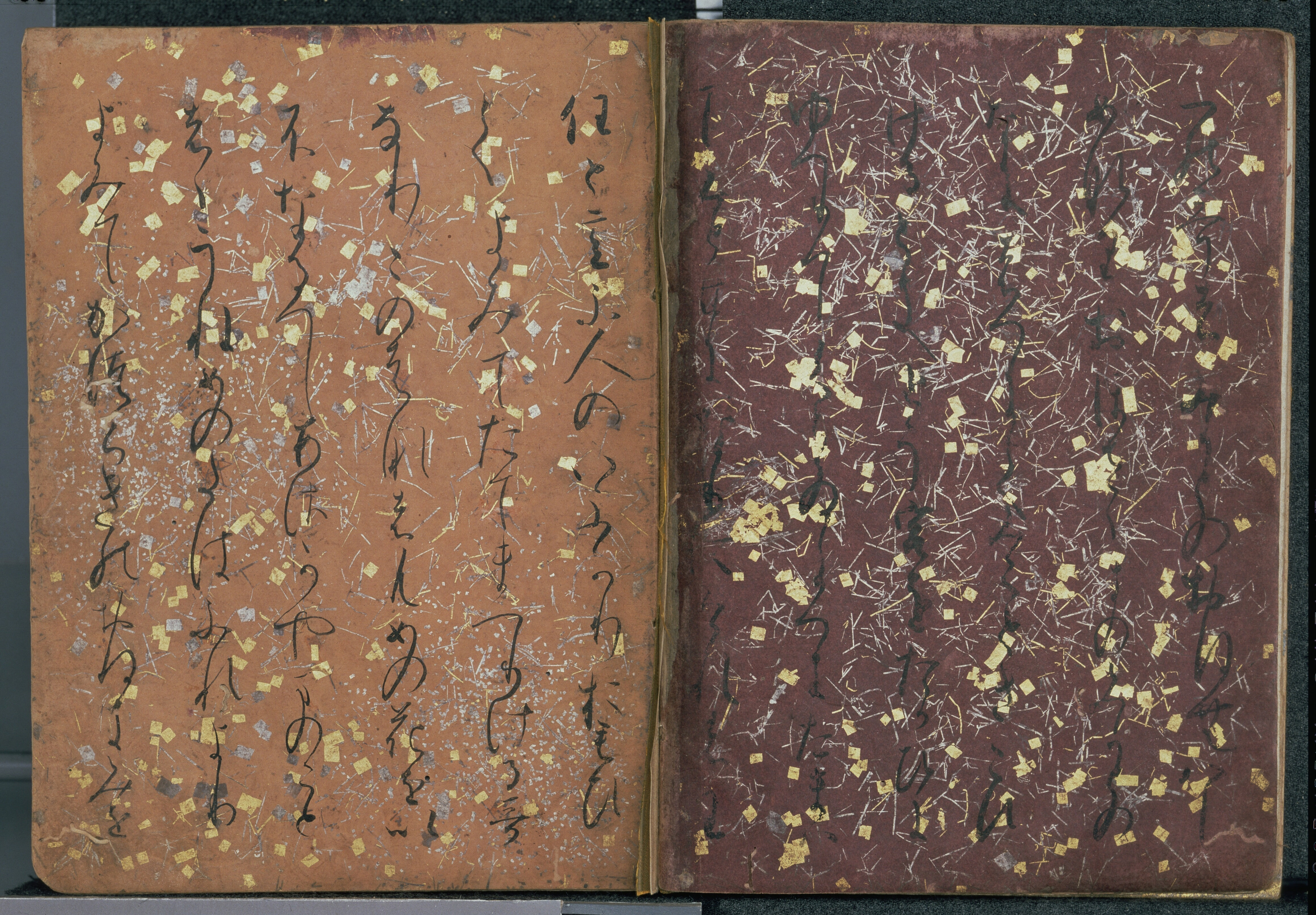
The Kokin Wakashū is an early (c. 900) anthology of waka poetry which fixed the form of Japanese poetry.

Waka (和歌; 'Japanese poem') is a type of poetry in classical Japanese literature. Although waka in modern Japanese is written as 和歌, in the past it was also written as 倭歌 (see Wa, an old name for Japan), and a variant name is yamato-uta (大和歌).

== Etymology ==
The word waka has two different but related meanings: the original meaning was "poetry in Japanese" and encompassed several genres such as chōka and sedōka (discussed below); the later, more common definition refers to poetry in a 5-7-5-7-7 metre. Up to and during the compilation of the Man'yōshū in the eighth century, the word waka was a general term for poetry composed in Japanese, and included several genres such as tanka (短歌; "short poem"), chōka (長歌; "long poem"), bussokusekika (仏足石歌; "Buddha footprint poem") and sedōka (旋頭歌; "repeating-the-first-part poem"). However, by the time of the Kokinshū's compilation at the beginning of the tenth century, all of these forms except for the tanka and chōka had effectively gone extinct, and chōka had significantly diminished in prominence. As a result, the word waka became effectively synonymous with tanka, and the word tanka fell out of use until it was revived at the end of the nineteenth century (see Tanka).

Tanka (hereafter referred to as waka) consist of five lines (句, ku; literally "phrases") of 5-7-5-7-7 on or syllabic units. Therefore, tanka is sometimes called Misohitomoji (三十一文字), meaning it contains 31 syllables in total.

== Forms of waka ==
The term waka originally encompassed a number of differing forms, principally tanka (短歌, "short poem") and chōka (長歌, "long poem"), but also including bussokusekika, sedōka (旋頭歌, "memorized poem") and katauta (片歌, "poem fragment"). These last three forms, however, fell into disuse at the beginning of the Heian period, and chōka vanished soon afterwards. Thus, the term waka came in time to refer only to tanka.

Name	Form	Note
Katauta	5-7-7	One half of an exchange of two poems; the shortest type of waka
Chōka	5-7-5-7-5-7...5-7-7	Repetition of 5 and 7 on phrases, with a last phrase containing 7 on. Mainly composed to commemorate public events, and often followed by a hanka or envoi. Numerous chōka appear prominently in the Man'yōshū, but only 5 in the Kokinshū.
Tanka	5-7-5-7-7	The most widely-composed type of waka throughout history
Sedōka	5-7-7-5-7-7	Composed of two sets of 5-7-7 (similar to two katauta). Frequently in the form of mondōka (問答歌, "dialogue poem") or an exchange between lovers (sōmonka).
Bussokusekika	5-7-5-7-7-7	A tanka with an extra phrase of 7 on added to the end

=== Chōka ===
Chōka consist of 5-7 on phrases repeated at least twice, and conclude with a 5-7-7 ending

The briefest chōka documented is Man'yōshū no. 802, which is of a pattern 5-7 5-7 5-7 5-7-7. It was composed by Yamanoue no Okura in the Nara period and runs:

瓜食めば
子ども思ほゆ
栗食めば
まして偲はゆ
何処より
来りしものそ
眼交に
もとな懸りて
安眠し寝さぬ

Uri hameba
Kodomo omohoyu
Kuri hameba
Mashite shinowayu
Izuku yori
Kitarishi monoso
Manakai ni
Motona kakarite
Yasui shi nasanu

When I eat melons
My children come to my mind;
When I eat chestnuts
The longing is even worse.
Where do they come from,
Flickering before my eyes.
Making me helpless
Endlessly night after night.
Not letting me sleep in peace?

The chōka above is followed by an envoi (反歌, hanka) in tanka form, also written by Okura:

銀も
金も玉も
何せむに
まされる宝
子にしかめやも

Shirokane mo
Kugane mo tama mo
Nanisemu ni
Masareru takara
Koni shikame yamo

What are they to me,
Silver, or gold, or jewels?
How could they ever
Equal the greater treasure
That is a child? They can not.

[English translation by Edwin Cranston]

In the early Heian period (at the beginning of the 10th century), chōka was seldom written and tanka became the main form of waka. Since then, the generic term waka came to be almost synonymous with tanka. Famous examples of such works are the diaries of Ki no Tsurayuki and Izumi Shikibu, as well as such collections of poem tales as The Tales of Ise and The Tales of Yamato.

=== Minor forms of waka ===
Lesser forms of waka featured in the Man'yōshū and other ancient sources exist. Besides that, there were many other forms like:

- Bussokusekika: This form carved on a slab of slate – the "Buddha footprint" or bussokuseki – at the Yakushi-ji temple in Nara. Also recorded in the Man'yōshū. The pattern is 5-7-5-7-7-7.
- Sedōka: The Man'yōshū and Kokinshū recorded this form. The pattern is 5-7-7-5-7-7.
- Katauta: The Man'yōshū recorded this form. Katauta means "half-poem". The pattern is 5-7-7.

== History ==
Waka has a long history, first recorded in the early 8th century in the Kojiki and Man'yōshū. Under influence from other genres such as kanshi, novels and stories such as Tale of Genji and even Western poetry, it developed gradually, broadening its repertoire of expression and topics.

The literary historian Donald Keene used four large categories

1. Early and Heian Literature (Kojiki to past The Tale of Genji to 1185)
2. The Middle Ages ('chūsei' from 1185, including the Kamakura and Muromachi periods)
3. Pre-Modern Era (1600–1867, then subdivided into 1600–1770 and 1770–1867)
4. Modern Era (post 1867, divided into Meiji (1868–1912), Taishō (1912–1926) and Shōwa (from 1927)).

=== Ancient ===
The most ancient waka were recorded in the historical record the Kojiki and the 20 volumes of the Man'yōshū, the oldest surviving waka anthology. The editor of the Man'yōshū is anonymous, but it is believed that the final editor was Ōtomo no Yakamochi. He was a waka poet who belonged to the youngest generation represented in the anthology; indeed, the last volume is dominated by his poems. The first waka of volume 1 was by Emperor Ōjin. Nukata no Ōkimi, Kakinomoto no Hitomaro, Yamabe no Akahito, Yamanoue no Okura, Ōtomo no Tabito and his son Yakamochi were the greatest poets in this anthology. The Man'yōshū recorded not only the works of the royalty and nobility, but also works of soldiers and farmers whose names were not recorded. The main topics of the Man'yōshū were love, sadness (especially on the occasion of someone's death), and other miscellaneous topics.

Early songs

Songs and poetry in the Kojiki and the Nihon Shoki

The Man'yōshū

=== Heian revival ===
During the Nara period and the early Heian period, the court favored Chinese-style poetry (kanshi) and the waka art form largely fell out of official favor. But in the 9th century, Japan stopped sending official envoys to Tang dynasty China. This severing of ties, combined with Japan's geographic isolation, essentially forced the court to cultivate native talent and look inward, synthesizing Chinese poetic styles and techniques with local traditions. The waka form again began flourishing, and Emperor Daigo ordered the creation of an anthology of waka, where the waka of ancient poets and their contemporaries were collected; the anthology was named Kokin Wakashū ("Collection of Ancient and Modern Japanese Poems"). It was presented to the emperor in 905. This was the first waka anthology edited and issued under imperial auspices, and it commenced a long and distinguished tradition of imperial anthologies of waka that continued up to the Muromachi period.

Rise of Japanese national culture

The first three chokusenshū

The first three imperially-commissioned waka anthologies (三代集, Sandai-shū) were the Kokin Wakashū, the Gosen Wakashū and the Shūi Wakashū. The Kokinshū was compiled by Ki no Tsurayuki, Ki no Tomonori, Ōshikōchi no Mitsune and Mibu no Tadamine on the orders of Emperor Daigo in 905. It collected roughly 1,100 waka that had not appeared in the Man'yōshū into 20 volumes, arranged by theme. The Kokinshū poems are generally considered to be reflective and idealistic.

Roughly half a century after the compilation of the Kokinshū, in 951, Emperor Murakami commanded the Five Men of the Pear Chamber to compile the Gosen Wakashū, in addition to preparing kundoku readings for the Man'yōshū, which by that time was already difficult for even educated Japanese to read.

In 1005 Emperor Ichijō commanded the compilation of the Shūishū.

The five later-Heian anthologies

The above three court anthologies, in addition to the five following anthologies, are known as the "Collections of Eight Ages" (八代集, Hachidai-shū), and were all compiled during the Heian period.

=== Kamakura and Muromachi periods ===
After the Heian period, during the Kamakura period and later, renga, a form of collaborative linked poetry, began to develop. In the late Heian period, three of the last great waka poets appeared: Fujiwara no Shunzei, his son Fujiwara no Teika, and Emperor Go-Toba. Emperor Go-Toba ordered the creation of a new anthology and joined in editing it. The anthology was named Shin Kokin Wakashū. He edited it again and again until he died in 1239. Teika made copies of ancient books and wrote on the theory of waka. His descendants, and indeed almost all subsequent poets, such as Shōtetsu, taught his methods and studied his poems. The courtly poetry scenes were historically dominated by a few noble clans and allies, each of which staked out a position.

By this period, a number of clans had fallen by the wayside, leaving the Reizei and the Nijō families; the former stood for "progressive" approaches, the varied use of the "ten styles" and novelty, while the latter conservatively hewed to already established norms and the "ushin" (deep feelings) style that dominated courtly poetry. Eventually, the Nijo family became defunct, leading to the ascendancy of the "liberal" Reizei family. Their innovative reign was soon deposed by the Asukai family, aided by the Ashikaga shōgun, Ashikaga Yoshinori.

In the Muromachi period, renga became popular in the court and people around it. It spread to the priestly classes and thence to wealthy commoners. In much the same way as waka, renga anthologies were produced under the imperial aegis. As momentum and popular interest shifted to the renga form, the tanka style was left to the Imperial court. Conservative tendencies exacerbated the loss of life and flexibility. A tradition named Kokin-denju, the heritage of Kokin Wakashū, was developed. It was a system on how to analyze the Kokin Wakashū and included the secret (or precisely lost) meaning of words. Studying waka degenerated into learning the many intricate rules, allusions, theories, and secrets, so as to produce tanka that would be accepted by the court.

There were comical waka already in the Kojiki and the Man'yōshū, but the noble style of waka in the court inhibited and scorned such aspects of waka. Renga was soon in the same position with many codes and strictures reflecting literary tradition. Haikai no renga (also called just haikai (playful renga)) and kyōka, comical waka, were a reaction to this seriousness. But in the Edo-period waka itself lost almost all of its flexibility and began to echo and repeat old poems and themes.

=== Edo period (1603–1867) ===
In the early Edo period, waka was not a fashionable genre. Newly created haikai no renga (of whose hokku, or opening verse, haiku was a late 19th-century revision) was the favored genre. This tendency was kept during this period, but in the late Edo period waka faced new trends from beyond the court. Motoori Norinaga, the great reviver of the traditional Japanese literature, attempted to revive waka as a way of providing "traditional feeling expressed in genuine Japanese way". He wrote waka, and waka became an important form to his followers, the Kokugaku scholars.

In Echigo Province a Buddhist priest, Ryōkan, composed many waka in a naïve style intentionally avoiding complex rules and the traditional way of waka. He belonged to another great tradition of waka: waka for expressing religious feeling. His frank expression of his feeling found many admirers, then and now. In the cities, a comical, ironic and satiric form of waka emerged. It was called kyōka (狂歌), mad poem, and was loved by intellectual people in big cities like Edo and Osaka. It was not precisely a new form; satirical waka was a style known since ancient times. But it was in the Edo period that this aspect of waka developed and reached an artistic peak. Still, most waka poets kept to ancient tradition or made those reformation another stereotype, and waka was not a vibrant genre in general at the end of this period.

== Notable waka poets ==
- Kakinomoto no Hitomaro
- Yamabe no Akahito
- Ōtomo no Yakamochi
- Henjō
- Ariwara no Narihira
- Fun'ya no Yasuhide
- Kisen
- Ono no Komachi
- Ōtomo no Kuronushi
- Izumi Shikibu
- Kanpū Ōmata
- Kūkai
- Ki no Tsurayuki
- Murasaki Shikibu
- Fujiwara no Teika (1162–1241)
- Saigyō (1118–1190)
- Minamoto no Sanetomo (1192–1219)
- Emperor Go-Toba (1180–1239)
- Kamo no Chōmei (1155–1216)
- Motoori Norinaga (1730–1801)
- Ueda Akinari (1734–1809)
- Ryōkan (1758–1831)
- Princess Kazu (1846–1877)
- Emperor Meiji (1852–1912)
- Mokichi Okada (1882–1955)
- Son Ho-yun (1923–2003)

== Famous waka collections ==
- Nijūichidaishū – The collective name for all 21 Imperially-commissioned waka anthologies
- Hyakunin Isshu – Fujiwara no Teika's collection of 100 poems by 100 poets
- Kokka Taikan – An encyclopaedic collection with index, first published in 1901
- Sankashū

== Glossary of terms related to waka composition ==
Term	Japanese	Definition
makura-kotoba	枕詞	Literally, "pillow word". Poetic epithets generally not used for their literal meaning but to "connect" with the word (often a place name) that follows
jokotoba	序詞	Literally, "preface words". Longer versions of makura-kotoba
kakekotoba	掛詞	Literally, "hanging word". A word deliberately used to convey two meanings, due to the existence of separate homophonic words. An example is matsu, which can mean either "a pine tree" (松, matsu) or "to wait" (待つ, matsu).
engo	縁語	Literally, "linked words". Semantically related words used on different positions of a waka
tsuiku	対句	Literally, "paired phrases". Similar to parallelism.
kugire	句切れ	Literally, "phrase gap". The most significant semantic gap in a waka.
honkadori	本歌取り	Literally, "taking from the main poem". Allusion to or quoting one or more lines from a poem written by someone else.
taigen-dome	体言止め	Ending a poem with a noun or noun phrase. Since Japanese is a subject–object–verb language, complete grammatical sentences typically end with the verb, but in waka composition this is not necessarily the case.

== See also ==
- Death poem – Japanese death poem (jisei) is mostly made in waka form
- Utakai Hajime – Emperor's waka meeting at the start of the year
- Iroha – Old Japanese syllabary in 7-5 metre poem form
- Kimigayo - Japanese national anthem based on a waka of early 10th century

== Bibliography ==
- Brower, Robert H., and Earl Miner, Japanese Court Poetry, Stanford University Press, 1961. ISBN 0-8047-1524-6 pbk

527 pp., a standard academic study.

- Carter, Steven D., editor and translator, Traditional Japanese Poetry: An Anthology. Stanford University Press, 1991

Waka, tanka, renga, haiku and senryū with translations and annotations

- Carter, Steven D., editor and translator, Waiting for the Wind: Thirty-Six Poets of Japan's Late Medieval Age, Columbia University Press, 1989
- Cranston, Edwin, editor and translator, A Waka Anthology, Volume One: The Gem-Glistening Cup, Stanford University Press, 1993. ISBN 0-8047-1922-5 cloth ISBN 0-8047-3157-8 pbk

988 pp. includes almost all waka from the Kojiki (Record of Ancient Matters completed 712) through the Man'yōshū (Collection for Ten Thousand Generations c.759) and also includes the Buddha's Footstone Poems (21 Bussokuseki poems carved in stone at the Yakushi-ji temple in Nara, c. 753)

- Cranston, Edwin, editor and translator, A Waka Anthology, Volume Two: Grasses of Remembrance, Stanford University Press, 2006. ISBN 0-8047-4825-X cloth
- McCullough, Helen Craig, Brocade by Night: 'Kokin Wakashū' and the Court Style in Japanese Classical Poetry, Stanford University Press, 1985
- McCullough, Helen Craig, Kokin Wakashū: The First Imperial Anthology of Japanese Poetry, with 'Tosa Nikki' and 'Shinsen Waka', Stanford University Press 1985
- Miner, Earl, An Introduction to Japanese Court Poetry, Stanford University Press, 1968.

Based on Brower and Miner

- Philippi, Donald, translator, This Wine of Peace, the Wine of Laughter: A Complete Anthology of Japan's Earliest Songs, New York, Grossman, 1968
- Sato, Hiroaki, and Watson, Burton, editors and translators, From the Country of Eight Islands: An Anthology of Japanese Poetry, multiple editions available
- Shirane Haruo, Nobuyuki Kanechiku, Kumiko Tabuchi, Hidenori Jinno, editors, "世界へひらく和歌 Waka Opening Up to the World", Benseisyuppan, 2012 ISBN 978-4585290346
