= Minamoto (surname) =

MINAMOTO
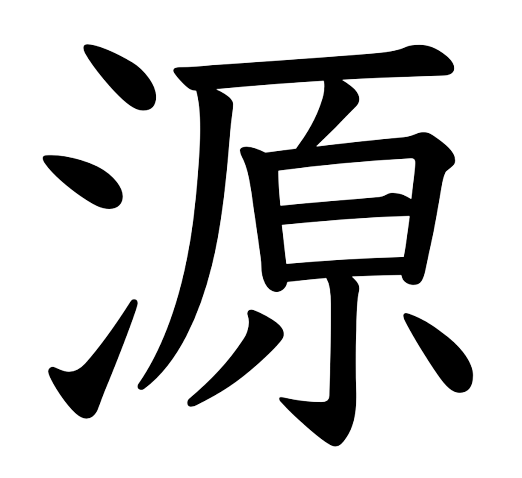
- Pronunciation: Mì-ná-mó-tó
- Gender: Male, Female
- Language: Japanese

Origin
- Origin: Kanji: 源 Hiragana: みなもと; Katakana: ミナモト
- Meaning: Source; Origin; Root
- Region of origin: Kyoto, Japan

Minamoto (源; みなもと、ミナモト) is an ancient and noble Japanese family name that is mostly known for its history as a powerful clan during the Heian period.

The name itself is not common today as most of the descendant families have taken other surnames, usually from their places of residence.

== People ==
=== Historical figures ===
- Minamoto no Makoto (源 信; 810 – 868), seventh son of the Japanese Emperor Saga
- Minamoto no Tōru (源 融; 822 – 895), Japanese poet and statesman, son of Emperor Saga of Japan
- Minamoto no Yoshiari (源 能有; 845 – 897), Japanese court official during the Heian period and son of Emperor Montoku of Japan
- Minamoto no Muneyuki (源 宗于; ? – 939), early Heian waka poet and Japanese nobleman, also known as Minamoto no Muneyuki Ason (源宗于朝臣)
- Minamoto no Hitoshi (源 等; 880 – 951), Japanese waka poet of the mid-Heian period
- Minamoto no Kintada (源 公忠; 889 – 948), middle Heian waka poet and Japanese nobleman, also known as Miyamoto no Kintada Ason (源公忠朝臣)
- Minamoto no Korezane (源 維城; 884 – 930), birth name of Emperor Daigo of Japan until 887
- Minamoto no Chikako (源 周子; ? – 935), court attendant (Koui) of Emperor Daigo of Japan
- Minamoto no Saneakira (源 信明; 910 – 970), middle Heian waka poet and Japanese nobleman
- Minamoto no Kanemasa (源 兼昌; dates unknown), waka poet and Japanese nobleman active in the Heian period
- Minamoto no Shitagō (源 順; 911 – 983), Japanese mid Heian waka poet, scholar and nobleman, descendant of Emperor Saga of Japan
- Minamoto no Hiromasa (源 博雅; 918 – 980), Japanese nobleman and gagaku musician in the Heian period
- Minamoto no Shigeyuki (源 重之; ? – 1000), early Heian waka poet and Japanese nobleman
- Minamoto no Takakuni (源 隆国; 1004 – 1077), Japanese noble and a scholar of ancient Japan, also known as Uji Dainagon (宇治大納言)
- Minamoto no Tsunemoto (源 経基; 894 – 961), Japanese samurai and Imperial Prince during Heian period
- Minamoto no Mitsunaka (源 満仲; 912 – 997), Japanese samurai and court official of the Heian period
- Minamoto no Yorimitsu (源 頼光; 948 – 1021), Japanese samurai served the regents of the Fujiwara clan along with his brother Yorinobu
- Minamoto no Yorinobu (源 頼信; 968 – 1048), Japanese samurai commander and member of the powerful Minamoto clan
- Minamoto no Tsuna (源 綱; 953 – 1025), Japanese samurai, companion of Minamoto no Yorimitsu, also known as Watanabe no Tsuna
- Minamoto no Yoriyoshi (源 頼義; 988 – 1075), Japanese samurai lord and the Chinjufu-shōgun head of the Minamoto clan
- Minamoto no Yorimasa (源 頼政; 1106 – 1180), prominent Japanese poet whose works appeared in various anthologies
- Minamoto no Shunrai (源 俊頼; 1055 – 1129), important and innovative Japanese poet, who compiled the Gosen Wakashū
- Minamoto no Tsunenobu (源 経信; 1016 – 1097), Japanese nobleman and waka poet in the Heian period
- Minamoto no Nakatsuna (源 仲綱; 1126 – 1180), Japanese samurai in the Battle of Uji in 1180 during that part of Genpei War
- Minamoto no Kanetsuna (源 兼綱; died 1180), Japanese samurai in the Battle of Uji in 1180 during that part of Genpei War
- Minamoto no Yoshiie (源 義家; 1039 – 1106), Japanese samurai and the Chinjufu-shōgun head of the Minamoto clan
- Minamoto no Yoshitsuna (源 義綱; 1042 – 1134), Japanese samurai of the Minamoto clan
- Minamoto no Tameyoshi (源 為義; 1096 – 1156), Japanese samurai and head of the Minamoto clan during his lifetime
- Minamoto no Yoshimitsu (源 義光; 1045 – 1127), Japanese samurai lord during the Heian period
- Minamoto no Yoshikiyo (源 義清; 1075 – 1149), Japanese samurai warlord of the late Heian period, founder of the Takeda Clan (武田氏) of Japan
- Minamoto no Yoshikuni (源 義国; 1082 – 1155), Japanese samurai who first implored the spirit of the Iwashimizu Shrine
- Minamoto no Yoshishige (源 義重; 1135 – 1202), Japanese progenitor of the Nitta branch family of the Minamoto clan
- Minamoto no Yoshiyasu (源 義康; 1127 – 1157), Japanese samurai, founder of the Ashikaga clan of Japan (also known as Ashikaga Yoshiyasu (足利 義康))
- Minamoto no Yoshitomo (源 義朝; 1123 – 1160), Japanese general of the late Heian period and head of the Minamoto clan
- Minamoto no Tametomo (源 為朝; 1139 – 1170), Japanese samurai who fought in the Hōgen Rebellion of 1156
- Minamoto no Yukiie (源 行家; c. 1141~1143 – 1186), brother of Minamoto no Yoshitomo, and commanders in the Genpei War
- Minamoto no Yoshinaka (源 義仲; 1154 – 1184), Japanese samurai lord in the late Heian period
- Minamoto no Yoshihira (源 義平; 1140 – 1160), Japanese samurai of the Minamoto clan
- Minamoto no Tomonaga (源 朝長; 1144 – 1160), Japanese samurai of the Minamoto clan of the late Heian period
- Minamoto no Yoritomo (源 頼朝; 1147 – 1199), Japanese samurai, founder and the first shogun of the Kamakura shogunate of Japan
- Minamoto no Noriyori (源 範頼; 1150 – 1193), Japanese general during late Heian period of the Minamoto clan
- Minamoto no Yoshitsune (源 義経; c. 1159 – 1189), Japanese commander of the Minamoto clan in the late Heian and early Kamakura periods
- Minamoto no Mochimitsu (源 以光; 1151 – 1180), son of Emperor Go-Shirakawa of Japan, also known as Prince Mochihito
- Minamoto no Mitsuyuki (源 光行; 1163 – 1244), Japanese governor in Kawachi province
- Minamoto no Ienaga (源 家長; c. 1170 – 1234), waka poet and Japanese nobleman active in the early Kamakura period
- Minamoto no Michitomo (源 通具; 1171 – 1227), waka poet and Japanese nobleman active in the early Kamakura period
- Minamoto no Sanetomo (源 実朝; 1192 – 1219), third shōgun of the Kamakura shogunate of Japan
- Minamoto no Ichiman (源 一幡; 1198 – 1203), eldest son of the 2nd Kamakura shōgun Minamoto no Yoriie
- Minamoto no Yoshinari (源 頼暁; 1200 – 1219), second son of 2nd Kamakura shōgun Minamoto no Yoriie, also known as the priest Kugyō (公暁)
- Minamoto no Chikako (源 親子), daughter of Kitabatake Morochika, and Imperial consort to Emperor Go-Daigo of Japan

=== Modern era ===
- Minamoto Yoko (源 洋子; born in 1967), Japanese sport shooter
- Minamoto Sumika (源 純夏; born in 1979), Japanese freestyle swimmer

== Fictional characters ==
- Minamoto Kō (源 光), in Japanese manga Toilet-Bound Hanako-kun
- Minamoto Teru (源 輝), in Japanese manga Toilet-Bound Hanako-kun
- Minamoto Kouji (源 輝二), in anime television series Digimon Frontier
- Minamoto Raikou (源 頼光), in Japanese manga Tactics
- Minamoto Tadakatsu (源 忠勝), in the visual novel Maji de Watashi ni Koi Shinasai!
- Minamoto Sakura (源 さくら), in anime television series Zombie Land Saga
- Minamoto Momo (源 モモ), in anime television series Release the Spyce
- Minamoto Shizuka (源 静香), in Japanese manga and anime Doraemon

== Others ==
- Minamoto clan, the most powerful and most important clan of all four great clans that dominated Japanese politics during the Heian, Kamakura, Muromachi and Edo periods in Japanese history.
