= Ogura Hyakunin Isshu =

Classical Japanese anthology

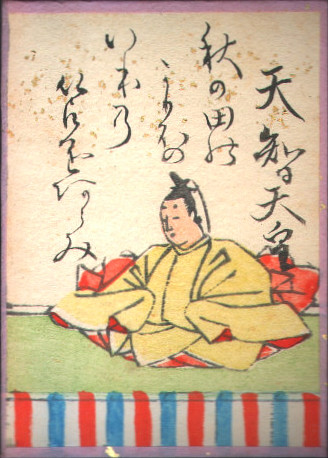
First poem card of the Hyakunin Isshu, featuring Emperor Tenji

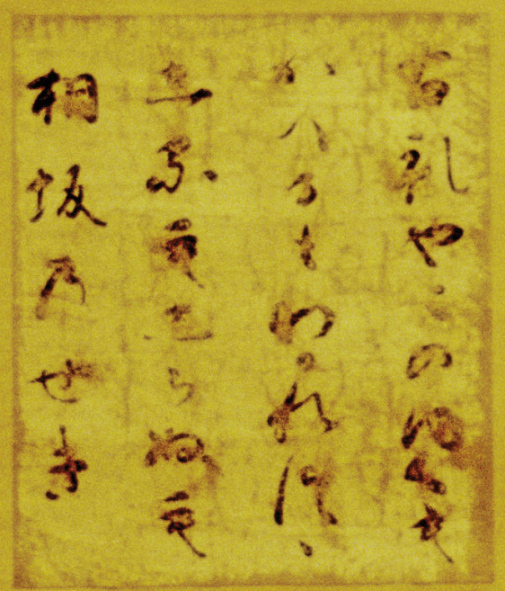
Ogura shikishi by Teika

Hyakunin Isshu (百人一首) is a classical Japanese anthology of one hundred Japanese waka by one hundred poets. Hyakunin Isshu can be translated to "one hundred people, one poem [each]"; it can also refer to the card game of uta-garuta, which uses a deck composed of cards based on the Hyakunin Isshu.

The most famous and standard version was compiled by Fujiwara no Teika (1162–1241) while he lived in the Ogura district of Kyoto. It is therefore also known as Ogura Hyakunin Isshu (小倉百人一首).

== Compilation ==
One of Teika's diaries, the Meigetsuki, says that his son Tameie asked him to arrange one hundred poems for Tameie's father-in-law, Utsunomiya Yoritsuna, who was furnishing a residence near Mount Ogura; hence the full name of Ogura Hyakunin Isshu. In order to decorate screens of the residence, Fujiwara no Teika produced the calligraphy poem sheets.

Hishikawa Moronobu (1618–1694) provided woodblock portraits for each of the poets included in the anthology. Katsukawa Shunshō (1726–1793) designed prints for a full-color edition published in 1775.

In his own lifetime, Teika was better known for other work. For example, in 1200 (Shōji 2), he prepared another anthology of one hundred poems for ex-Emperor Go-Toba, called the Shōji Hyakushu.

== Poets ==
1. Emperor Tenji (天智天皇)
2. Empress Jitō (持統天皇)
3. Kakinomoto no Hitomaro (柿本人麻呂)
4. Yamabe no Akahito (山部赤人)
5. Sarumaru Dayū (猿丸大夫)
6. Middle Counselor Yakamochi (中納言家持)
7. Abe no Nakamaro (阿倍仲麻呂)
8. Priest Kisen (喜撰法師)
9. Ono no Komachi (小野小町)
10. Semimaru (蝉丸)
11. Councillor Takamura (参議篁)
12. High Priest Henjō (僧正遍昭)
13. Retired Emperor Yōzei (陽成院)
14. Minister of the Left of Kawara (河原左大臣)
15. Emperor Kōkō (光孝天皇)
16. Middle Counselor Yukihira (中納言行平)
17. Ariwara no Narihira Ason (在原業平朝臣)
18. Fujiwara no Toshiyuki Ason (藤原敏行朝臣)
19. Ise (伊勢)
20. Prince Motoyoshi (元良親王)
21. Priest Sosei (素性法師)
22. Fun'ya no Yasuhide (文屋康秀)
23. Ōe no Chisato (大江千里)
24. Kanke (菅家)
25. Minister of the Right of Sanjō (三条右大臣)
26. Teishin-kō (貞信公)
27. Middle Counselor Kanesuke (中納言兼輔)
28. Minamoto no Muneyuki Ason (源宗于朝臣)
29. Ōshikōchi no Mitsune (凡河内躬恒)
30. Mibu no Tadamine (壬生忠岑)
31. Sakanoue no Korenori (坂上是則)
32. Harumichi no Tsuraki (春道列樹)
33. Ki no Tomonori (紀友則)
34. Fujiwara no Okikaze (藤原興風)
35. Ki no Tsurayuki (紀貫之)
36. Kiyohara no Fukayabu (清原深養父)
37. Fun'ya no Asayasu (文屋朝康)
38. Ukon (右近)
39. Councillor Hitoshi (参議等)
40. Taira no Kanemori (平兼盛)
41. Mibu no Tadami (壬生忠見)
42. Kiyohara no Motosuke (清原元輔)
43. Acting Middle Counselor Atsutada (権中納言敦忠)
44. Middle Counselor Asatada (中納言朝忠)
45. Kentoku-kō (謙徳公)
46. Sone no Yoshitada (曽禰好忠)
47. Priest Egyō (恵慶法師)
48. Minamoto no Shigeyuki (源重之)
49. Ōnakatomi no Yoshinobu Ason (大中臣能宣朝臣)
50. Fujiwara no Yoshitaka (藤原義孝)
51. Fujiwara no Sanekata Ason (藤原実方朝臣)
52. Fujiwara no Michinobu Ason (藤原道信朝臣)
53. Mother of the Right Captain Michitsuna (右大将道綱母)
54. Mother of the Honorary Grand Minister (儀同三司母)
55. Upper Counselor Kintō (大納言公任)
56. Izumi Shikibu (和泉式部)
57. Murasaki Shikibu (紫式部)
58. Daini no Sanmi (大弐三位)
59. Akazome Emon (赤染衛門)
60. Koshikibu no Naishi (小式部内侍)
61. Ise no Taifu (伊勢大輔)
62. Sei Shōnagon (清少納言)
63. Master of the Left Capital Michimasa (左京大夫道雅)
64. Acting Middle Counselor Sadayori (権中納言定頼)
65. Sagami (相模)
66. Senior High Priest Gyōson (大僧正行尊)
67. Suō no Naishi (周防内侍)
68. Retired Emperor Sanjō (三条院)
69. Priest Nōin (能因法師)
70. Priest Ryōzen (良暹法師)
71. Upper Counselor Tsunenobu (大納言経信)
72. Kii of Princess Yūshi's Household (祐子内親王家紀伊)
73. Acting Middle Counselor Masafusa (権中納言匡房)
74. Minamoto no Toshiyori Ason (源俊頼朝臣)
75. Fujiwara no Mototoshi (藤原基俊)
76. Lay Novice of Hosshō-ji Temple, former Kampaku and Chancellor of the Realm (法性寺入道前関白太政大臣)
77. Retired Emperor Sutoku (崇徳院)
78. Minamoto no Kanemasa (源兼昌)
79. Master of the Left Capital Akisuke (左京大夫顕輔)
80. Horikawa, attendant to Empress Taiken (待賢門院堀河)
81. Later Tokudaiji Minister of the Left (後徳大寺左大臣)
82. Priest Dōin (道因法師)
83. Master of the Empress Dowager's Household Toshinari (皇太后宮大夫俊成)
84. Fujiwara no Kiyosuke Ason (藤原清輔朝臣)
85. Priest Shun'e (俊恵法師)
86. Priest Saigyō (西行法師)
87. Priest Jakuren (寂蓮法師)
88. Attendant to Empress Kōka (皇嘉門院別当)
89. Princess Shikishi (式子内親王)
90. Attendant to Empress Inpu (殷富門院大輔)
91. Gokyōgoku Regent and former Chancellor of the Realm (後京極摂政前太政大臣)
92. Sanuki, attendant to retired Emperor Nijō (二条院讃岐)
93. Minister of the Right of Kamakura (鎌倉右大臣)
94. Councillor Masatsune (参議雅経)
95. Former Senior High Priest Jien (前大僧正慈円)
96. Lay Novice and former Chancellor of the Realm (入道前太政大臣)
97. Acting Middle Counselor Sadaie (権中納言定家)
98. Junior Second Rank Ietaka (従二位家隆)
99. Retired Emperor Go-Toba (後鳥羽院)
100. Retired Emperor Juntoku (順徳院)

== Poems ==
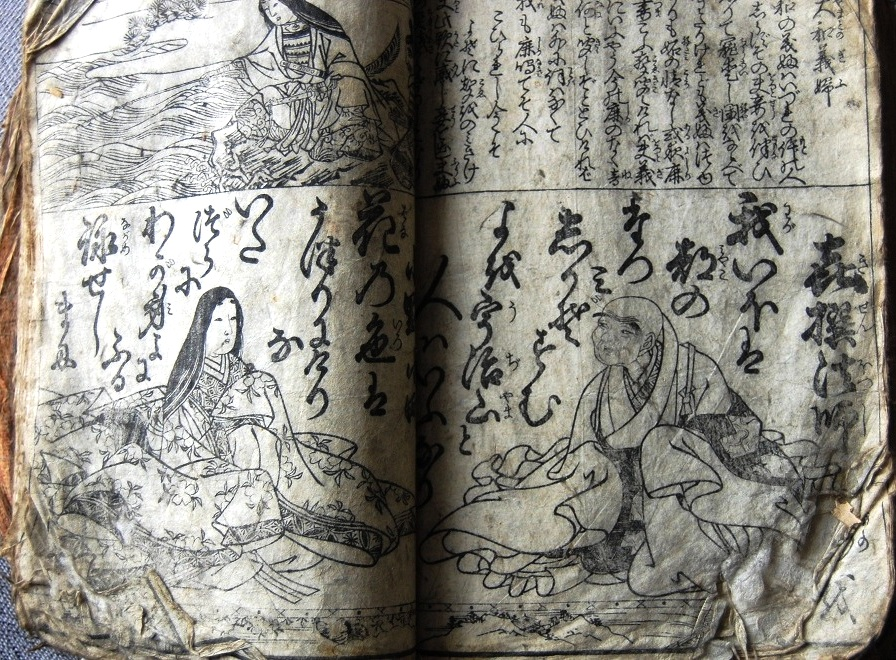
An Edo-period illustrated Hyakunin Isshu book, with Priest Kisen and Ono no Komachi

=== Poem number 1 ===
A poem by Emperor Tenji about the hardships of farmers. Teika chose this poem from the Gosen Wakashū:

秋の田のかりほの庵の苫をあらみ
わが衣手は露にぬれつつ
aki no ta no kariho no io no toma o arami
waga koromode wa tsuyu ni nuretsutsu
In autumn paddies under the temporary dwelling made of rushes, my sleeves are wet with the dew.
(Gosen Wakashū 6:302)

=== Poem number 2 ===
A visually-descriptive poem attributed to Empress Jitō. Teika chose this poem from the Shin Kokin Wakashū:

春過ぎて夏来にけらし白妙の
衣干すてふ天の香具山
haru sugite natsu kinikerashi shirotae no
koromo hosu chō Ama no Kaguyama
Spring has passed, and the white robes of summer are being aired on fragrant Mount Kagu—beloved of the gods.
(Shin Kokin Wakashū 3:175)

The original was likely based from a poem of the Man'yōshū (book 1, poem 28) by the same poet.

=== Poem number 26 ===
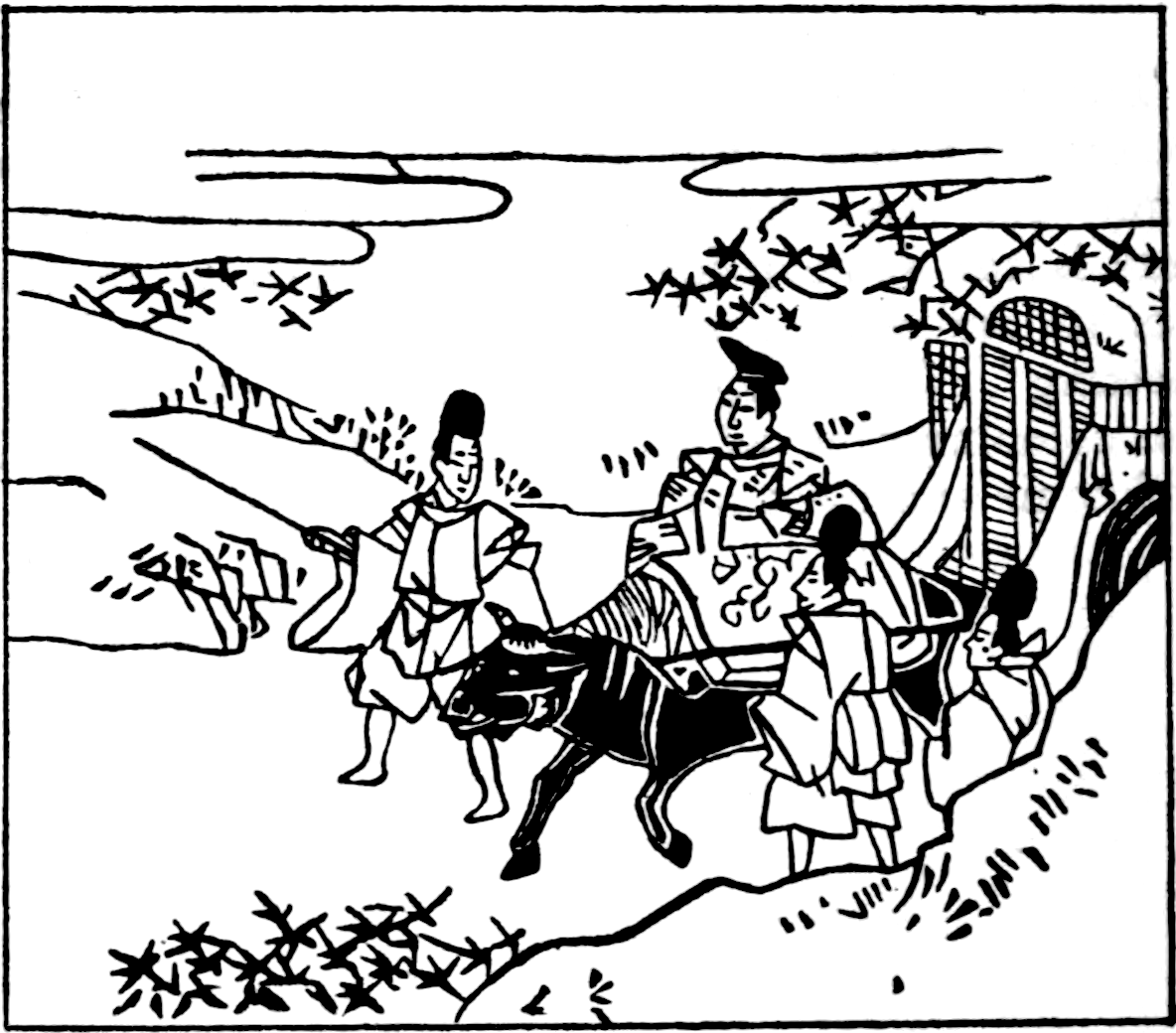
Illustration of Poem 26, after an 18th-century Japanese print

A quite different poem is attributed to Sadaijin Fujiwara no Tadahira in the context of a very specific incident. After abdicating, former Emperor Uda visited Mount Ogura in Yamashiro Province. He was so greatly impressed by the beauty of autumn colours of the maples that he ordered Fujiwara no Tadahira to encourage Uda's son and heir, Emperor Daigo, to visit the same area.

Prince Tenshin or Teishin (貞信公, Teishin-kō) was Tadahira's posthumous name, and this is the name used in William Porter's translation of the poem which observes that "[t]he maples of Mount Ogura / If they could understand / Would keep their brilliant leaves / until [t]he Ruler of this land / Pass with his Royal band." The accompanying 18th century illustration shows a person of consequence riding an ox in a procession with attendants on foot. The group is passing through an area of maple leaves.

Teika chose this poem from the Shūi Wakashū for the hundred poems collection:

小倉山峰のもみぢ葉心あらば
今ひとたびの行幸またなむ
Ogura-yama mine no momijiba kokoro araba
ima hitotabi no miyuki matanan
Maple leaves on Ogura mountain: if you had a heart, I would have you wait for one more royal visit!
(Shūi Wakashū 17:1128)

=== Poem number 86 ===
A poem by Saigyō about the pain of love. This poem was chosen from the Senzai Wakashū:

嘆けとて月やは物を思はする
かこち顔なるわが涙かな
nageke to te tsuki ya wa mono wo omowasuru
kakochi-gao naru waga namida ka na
How could the moon make me fall into thought by saying "Lament!"? Although it is attributed to me being in love, I attribute my tears falling down to the moon.
(Senzai Wakashū 15:926)

== Order of arrangement of the collection ==
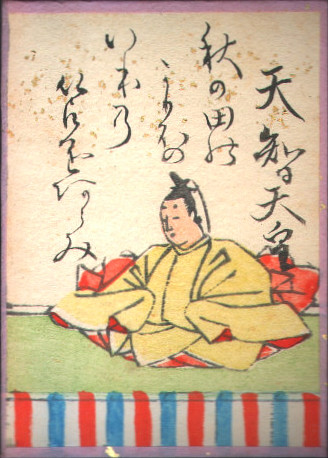
1.
Emperor Tenji
天智天皇

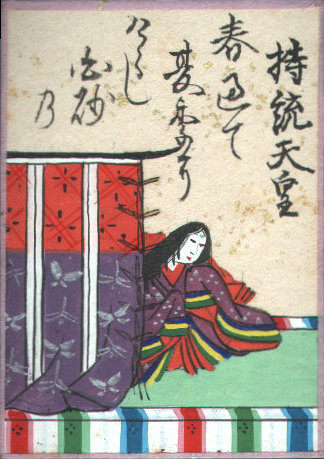
2.
Empress Jitō
持統天皇

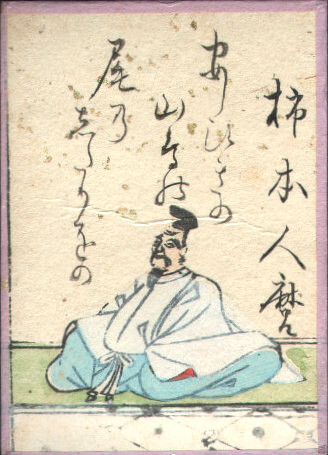
3.
Kakinomoto no Hitomaro
柿本人麿

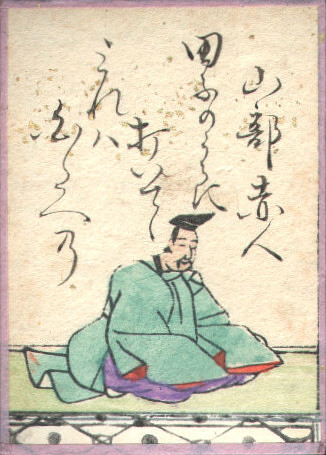
4.
Yamabe no Akahito
山辺赤人

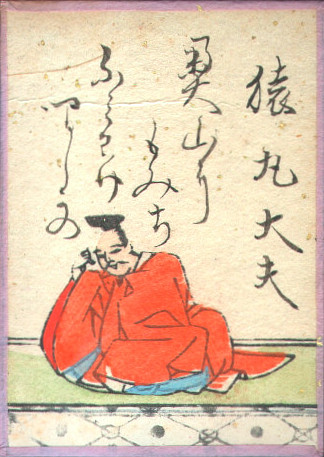
5.
Sarumaru Dayū
猿丸大夫

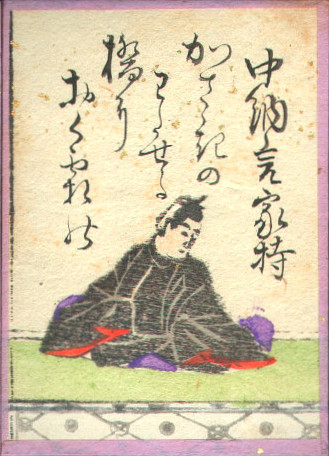
6.
Chūnagon Yakamochi
中納言家持

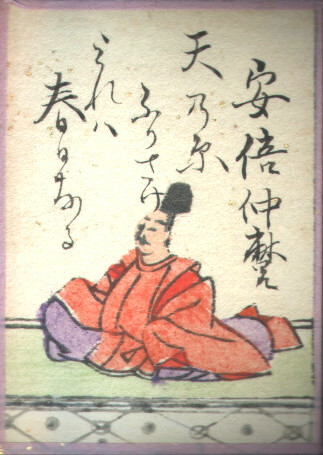
7.
Abe no Nakamaro
安倍仲麿

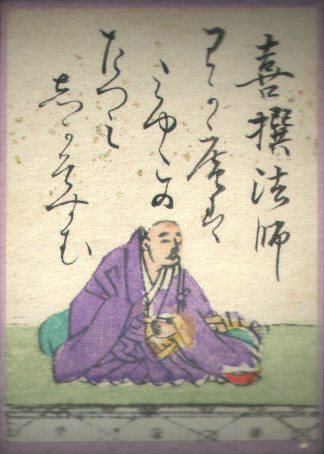
8.
Kisen Hōshi
喜撰法師

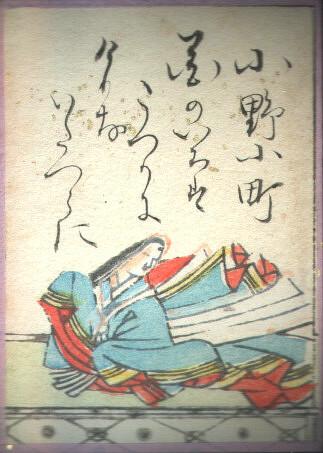
9.
Ono no Komachi
小野小町

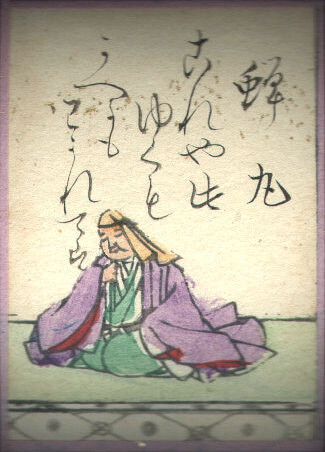
10.
Semimaru
蝉丸

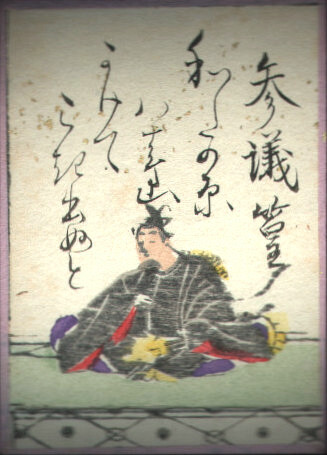
11.
Sangi Takamura
参議篁

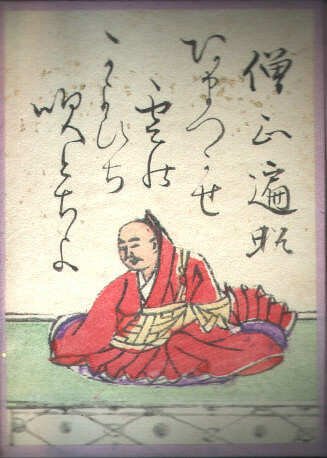
12.
Sōjō Henjō
僧正遍昭

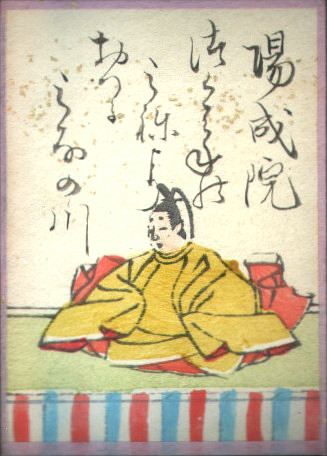
13.
Retired Emperor Yōzei
陽成院

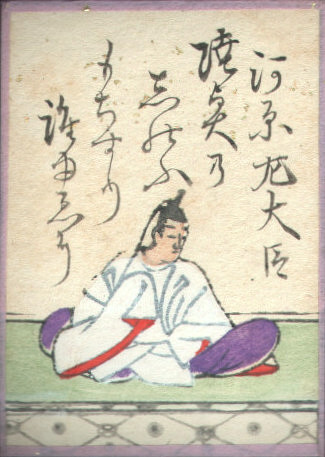
14.
Minister of the Left of Kawara
河原左大臣

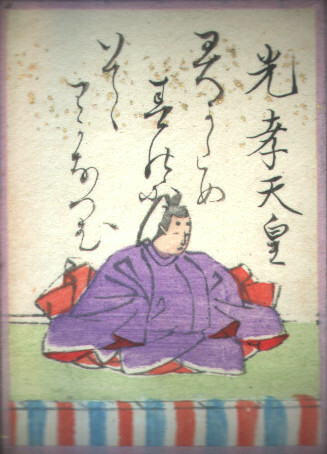
15.
Emperor Kōkō
光孝天皇

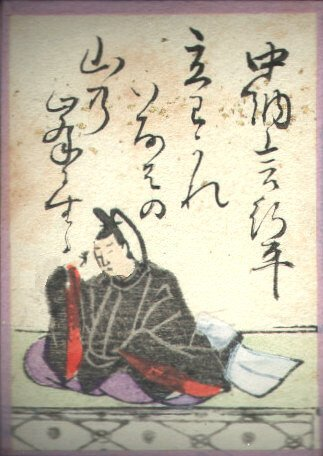
16.
Chūnagon Yukihira
中納言行平

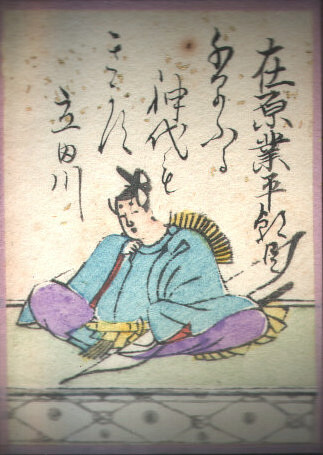
17.
Ariwara no Narihira Ason
在原業平朝臣

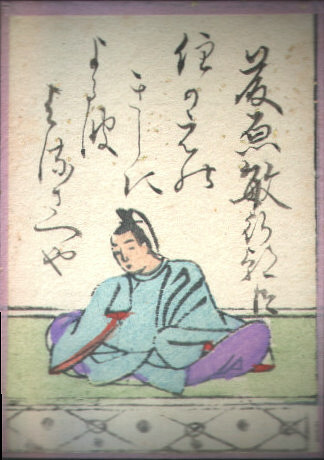
18.
Fujiwara no Toshiyuki Ason
藤原敏行朝臣

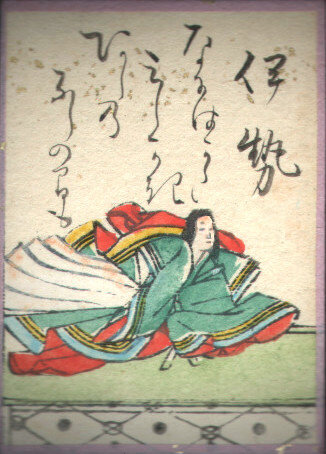
19.
Ise
伊勢

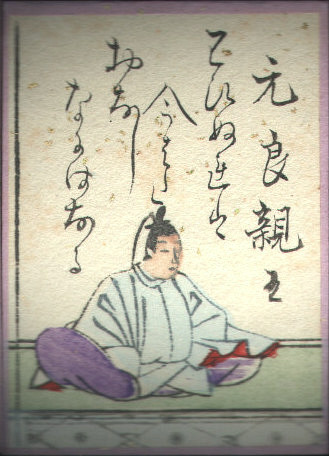
20.
Prince Motoyoshi
元良親王

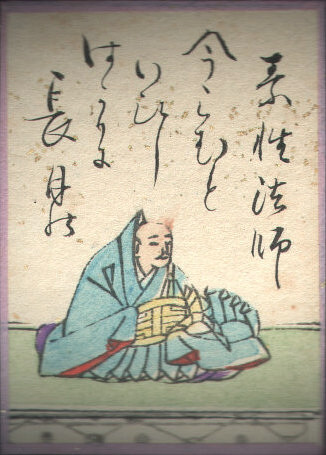
21.
Sosei Hōshi
素性法師

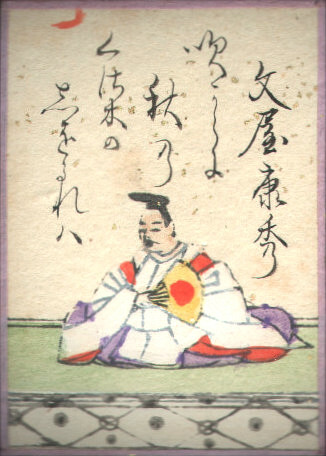
22.
Fun'ya no Yasuhide
文屋康秀

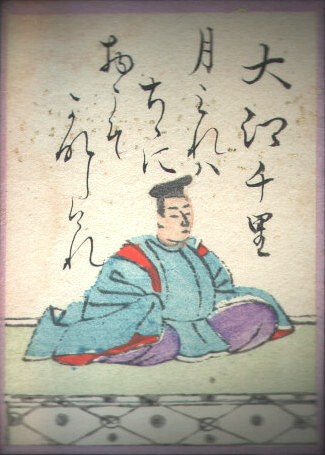
23.
Ō'e no Chisato
大江千里

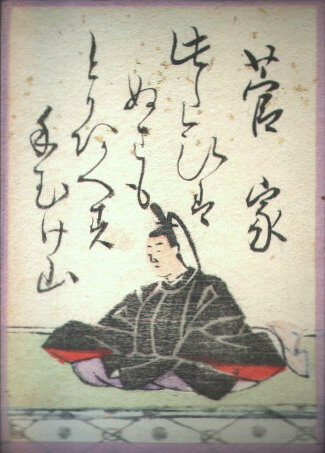
24.
Kanke
菅家

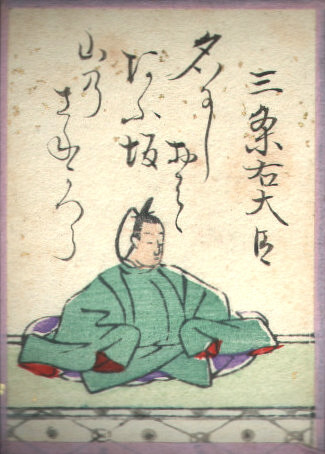
25.
Minister of the Right of Sanjō
三条右大臣

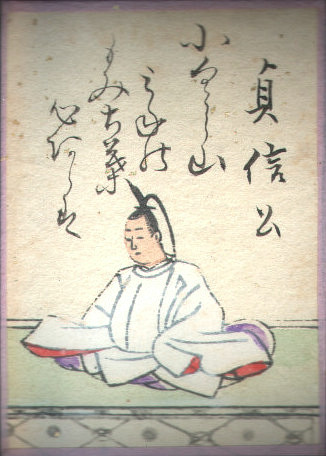
26.
Teishin-kō
貞信公

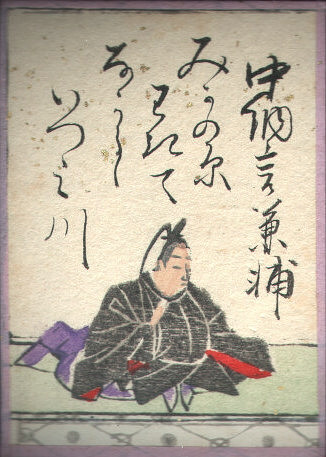
27.
Chūnagon Kanesuke
中納言兼輔

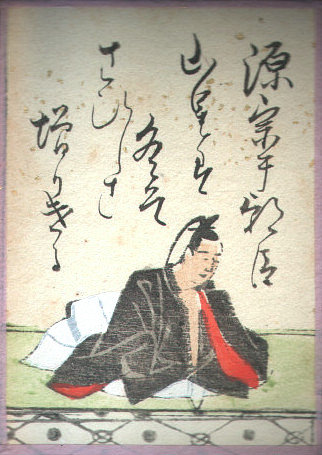
28.
Minamoto no Muneyuki Ason
源宗于朝臣

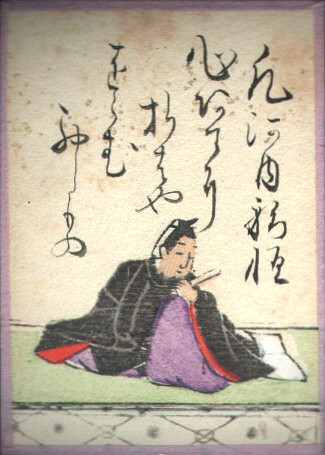
29.
Ōshikōchi no Mitsune
凡河内躬恒

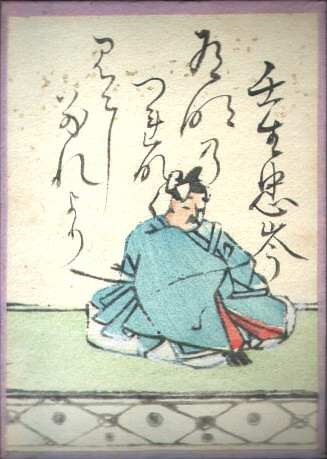
30.
Mibu no Tadamine
壬生忠岑

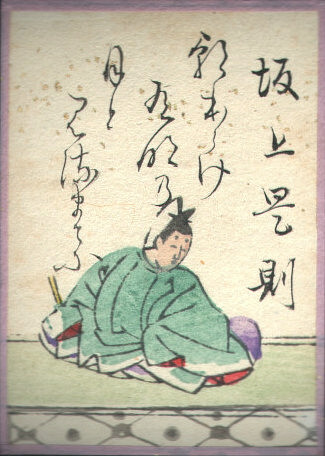
31.
Sakanoue no Korenori
坂上是則

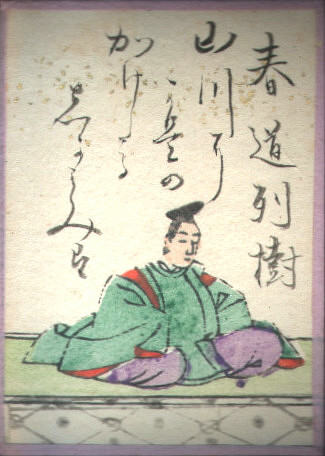
32.
Harumichi no Tsuraki
春道列樹

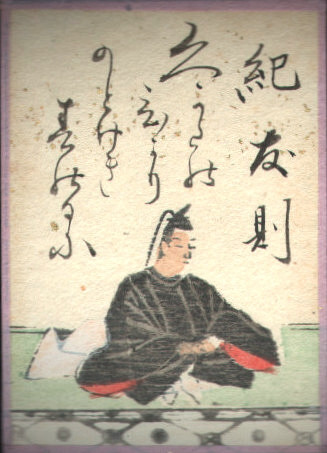
33.
Ki no Tomonori
紀友則

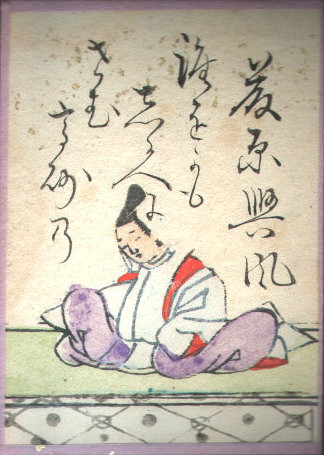
34.
Fujiwara no Okikaze
藤原興風

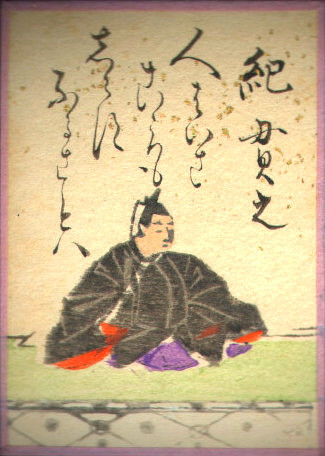
35.
Ki no Tsurayuki
紀貫之

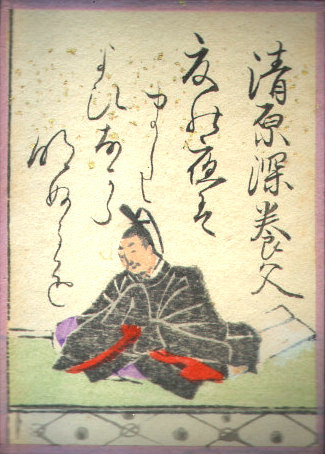
36.
Kiyohara no Fukayabu
清原深養父

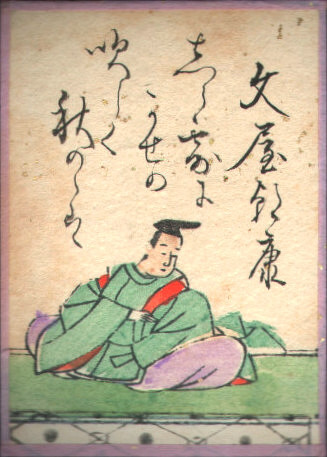
37.
Fun'ya no Asayasu
文屋朝康

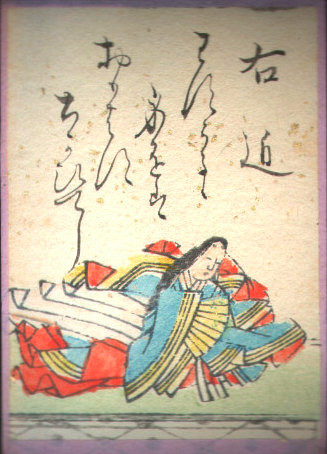
38.
Ukon
右近

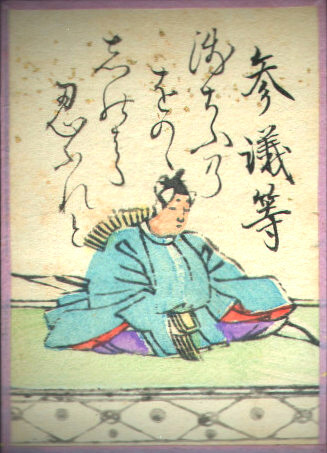
39.
Sangi Hitoshi
参議等

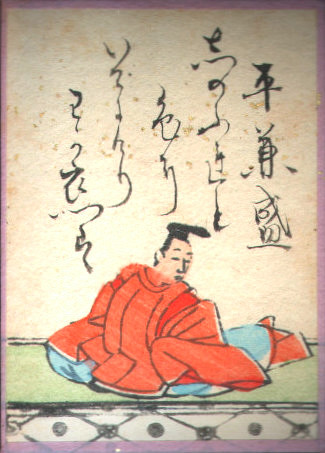
40.
Taira no Kanemori
平兼盛

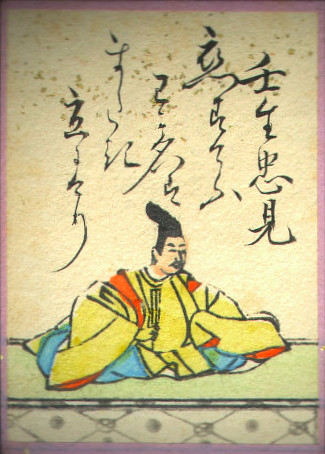
41.
Mibu no Tadami
壬生忠見

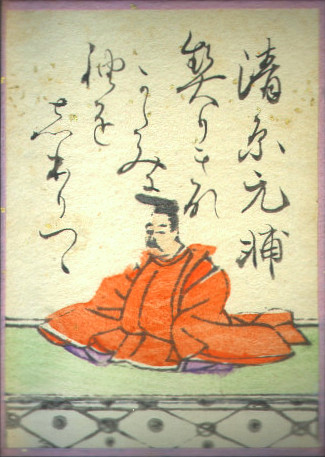
42.
Kiyohara no Motosuke
清原元輔

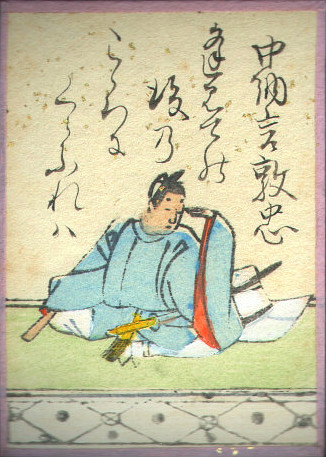
43.
Acting Chūnagon Atsutada
権中納言敦忠

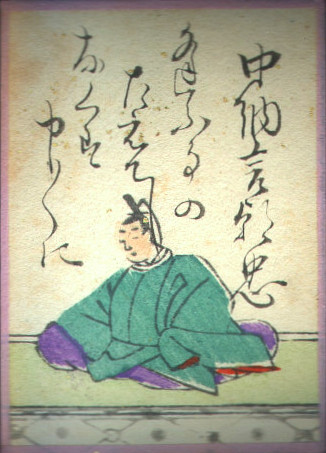
44.
Chūnagon Asatada
中納言朝忠

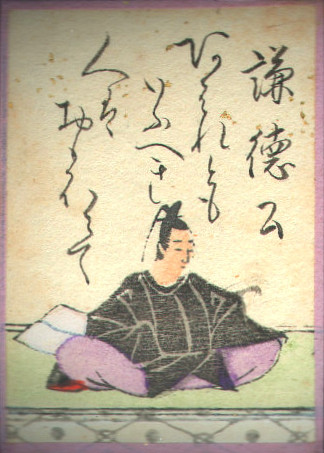
45.
Kentoku-kō
謙徳公

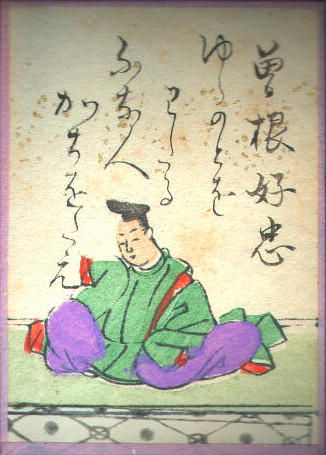
46.
Sone no Yoshitada
曽禰好忠

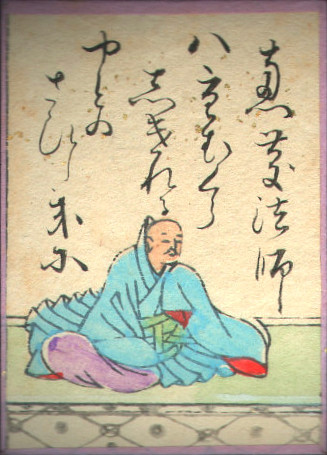
47.
Egyō Hōshi
恵慶法師

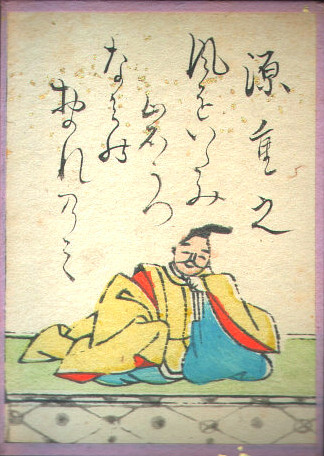
48.
Minamoto no Shigeyuki
源重之

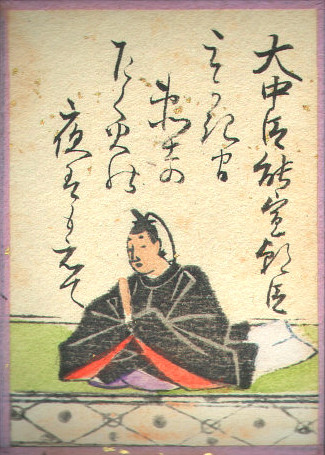
49.
Ōnakatomi no Yoshinobu Ason
大中臣能宣朝臣

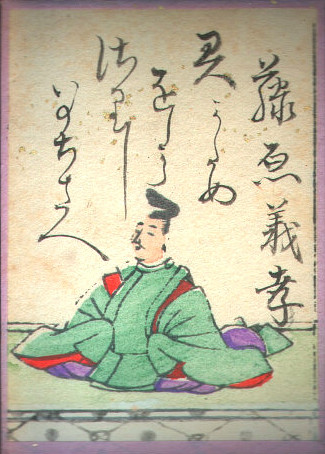
50.
Fujiwara no Yoshitaka
藤原義孝

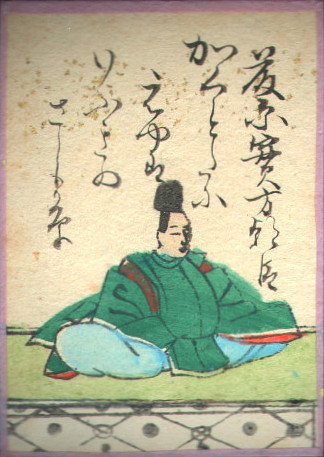
51.
Fujiwara no Sanekata Ason
藤原実方朝臣

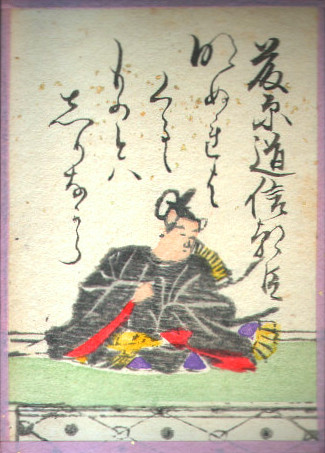
52.
Fujiwara no Michinobu Ason
藤原道信朝臣

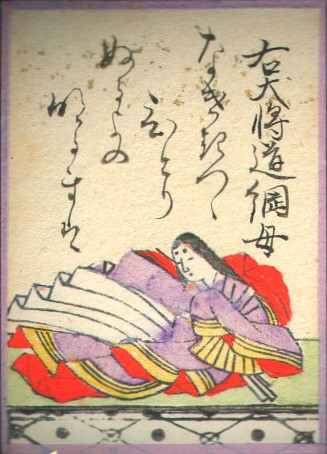
53.
Mother of the Right Captain Michitsuna
右大将道綱母

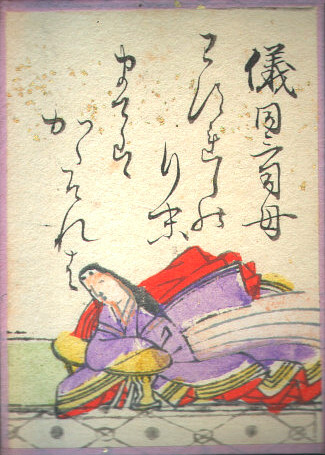
54.
Mother of the Honorary Grand Minister
儀同三司母

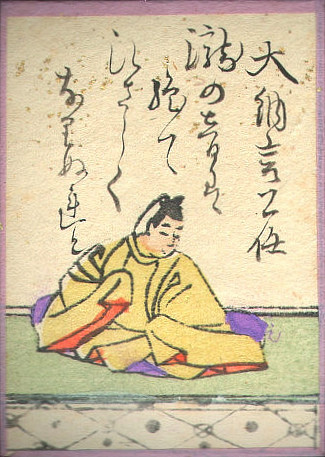
55.
Dainagon Kintō
大納言公任

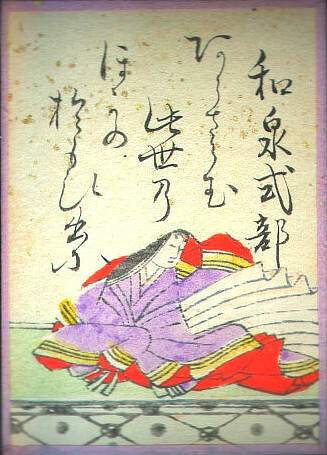
56.
Izumi Shikibu
和泉式部

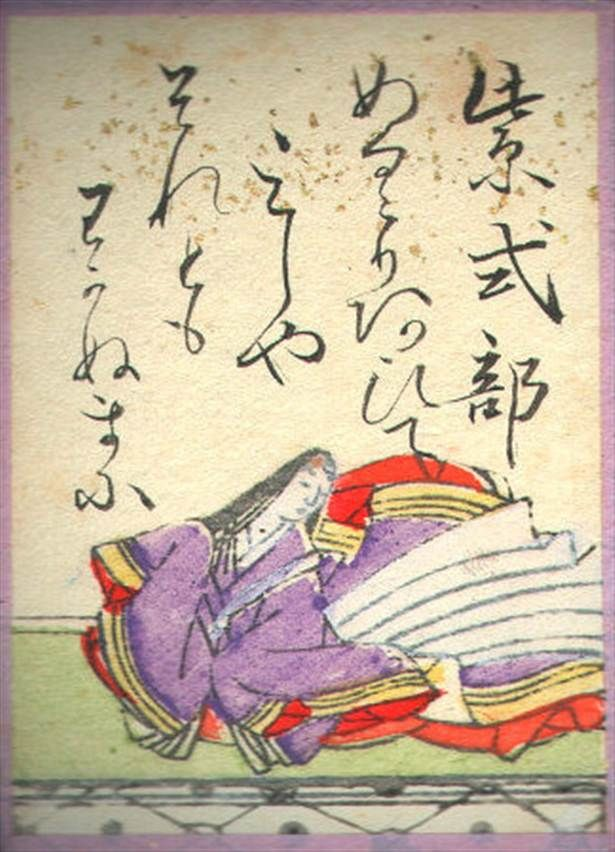
57.
Murasaki Shikibu
紫式部

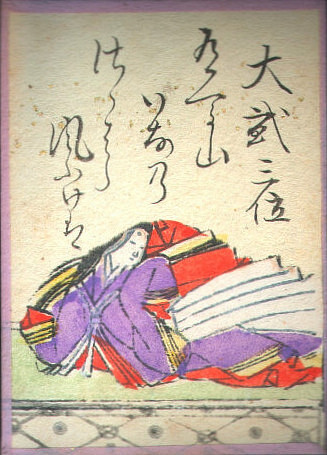
58.
Daini no San'mi
大弐三位

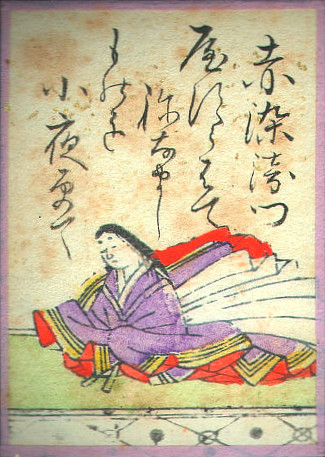
59.
Akazome Emon
赤染衛門

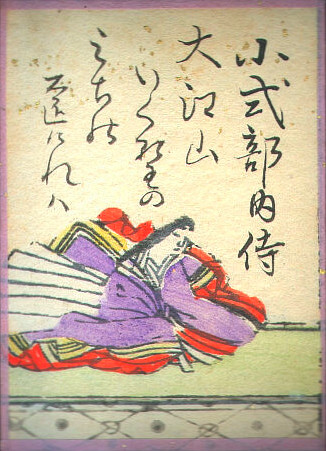
60.
Ko Shikibu no Naishi
小式部内侍

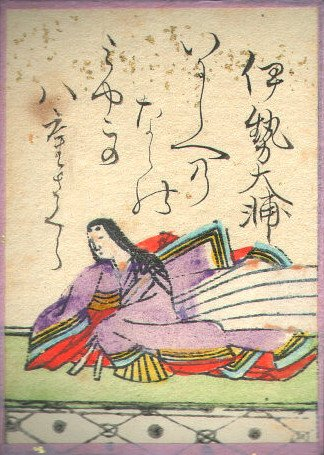
61.
Ise no Taifu
伊勢大輔

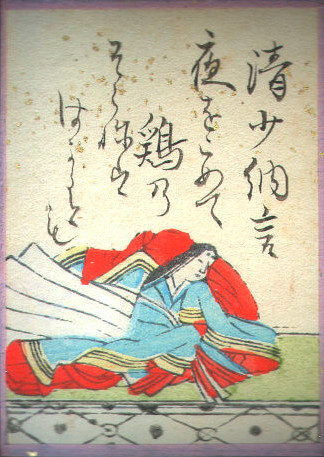
62.
Sei Shōnagon
清少納言

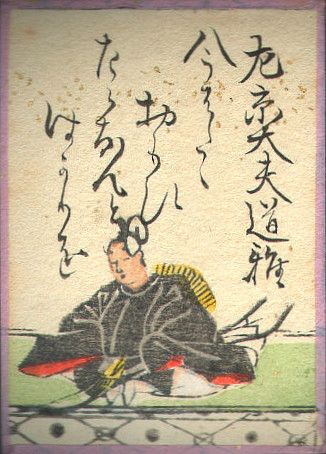
63.
Sakyō no Daibu Michimasa
左京大夫道雅

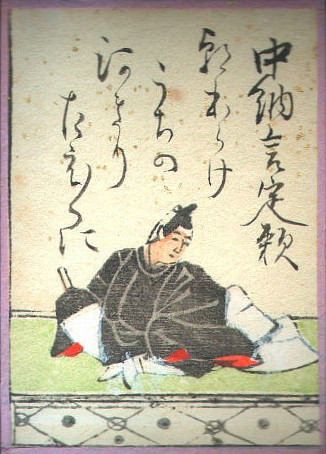
64.
Acting Chūnagon Sadayori
権中納言定頼

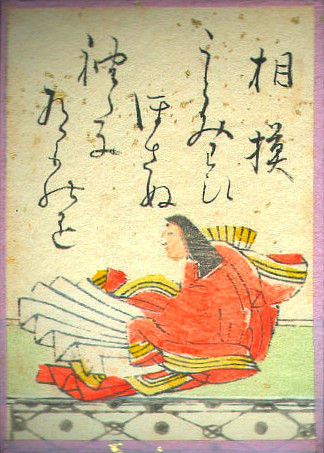
65.
Sagami
相模

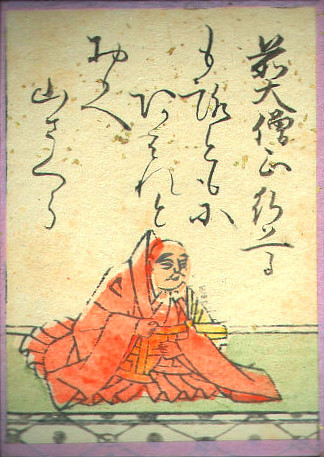
66.
Dai Sōjō Gyōson
大僧正行尊

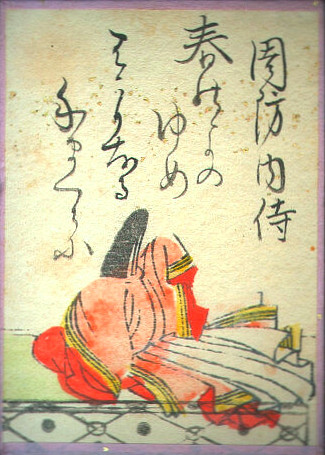
67.
Suō no Naishi
周防内侍

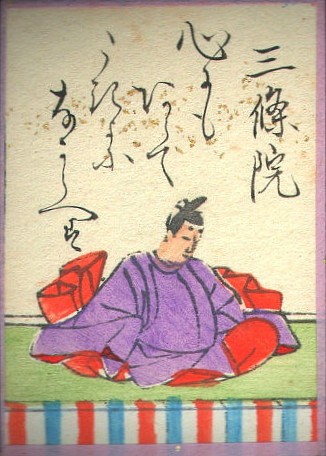
68.
Retired Emperor Sanjō
三条院

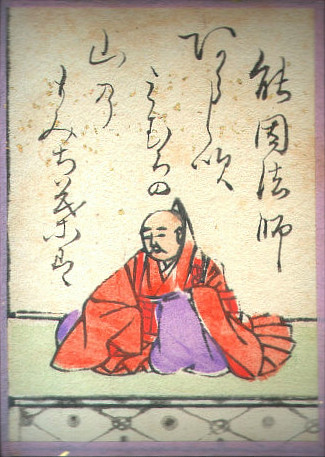
69.
Nō'in Hōshi
能因法師

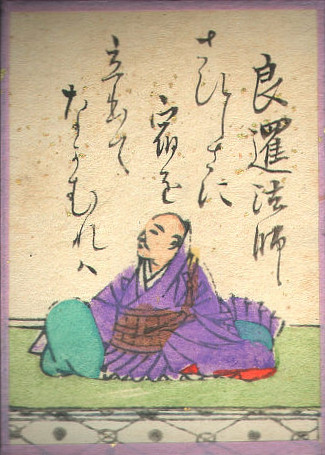
70.
Ryōsen Hōshi
良暹法師

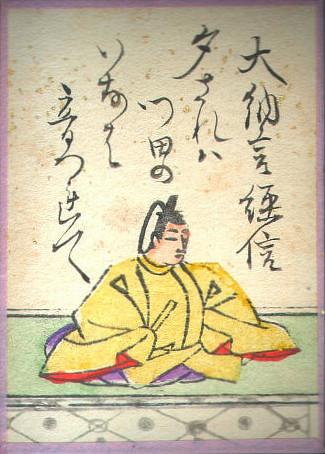
71.
Dainagon Tsunenobu
大納言経信

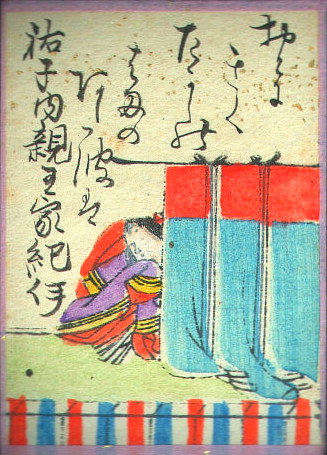
72.
Kii of Princess Yūshi's Household
祐子内親王家紀伊

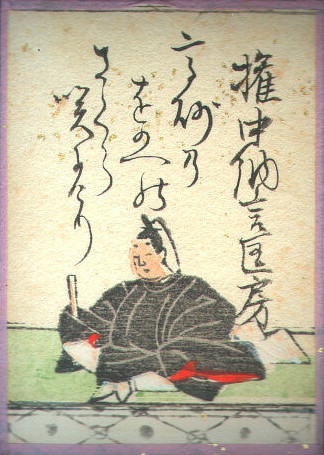
73.
Acting Chūnagon Masafusa
権中納言匡房

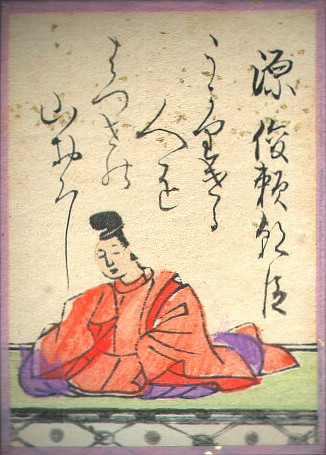
74.
Minamoto no Toshiyori Ason
源俊頼朝臣

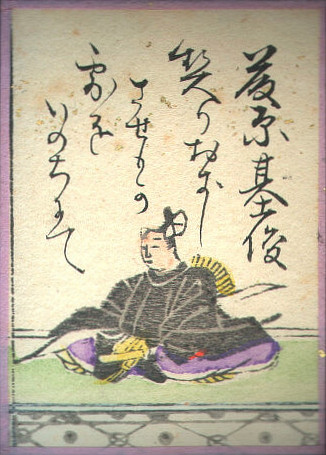
75.
Fujiwara no Mototoshi
藤原基俊

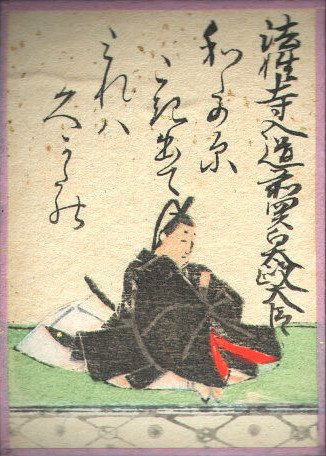
76.
Lay Novice of Hosshō-ji Temple, former Kampaku and Chancellor of the Realm
法性寺入道前関白太政大臣

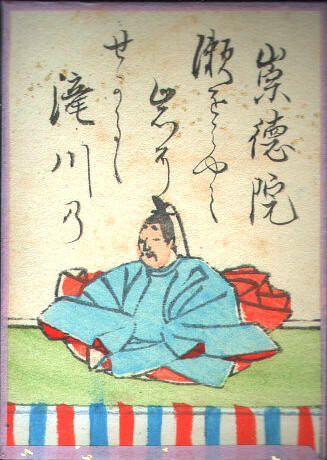
77.
Retired Emperor Sutoku
崇徳院

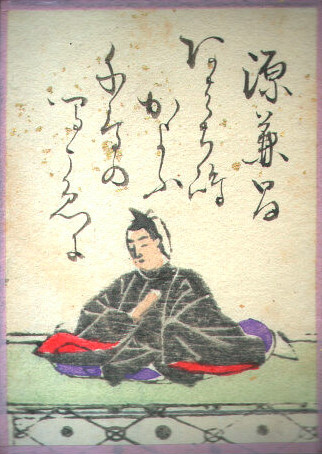
78.
Minamoto no Kanemasa
源兼昌

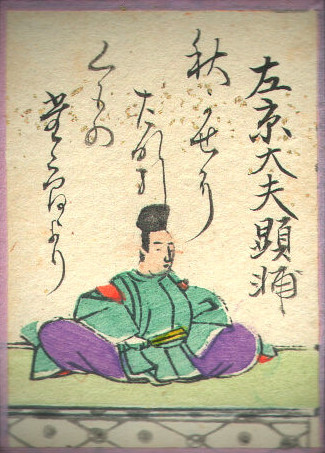
79.
Sakyō no Daibu Akisuke
左京大夫顕輔

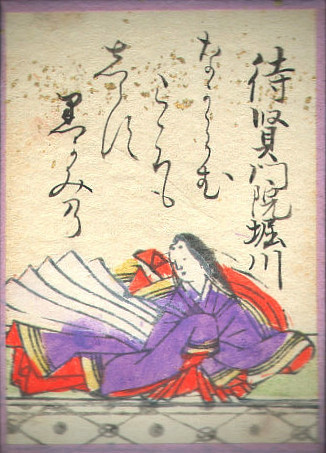
80.
Taikenmon In no Horikawa
待賢門院堀河

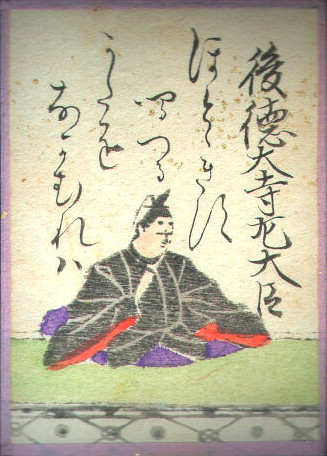
81.
Go-Tokudaiji Sa-daijin
後徳大寺左大臣

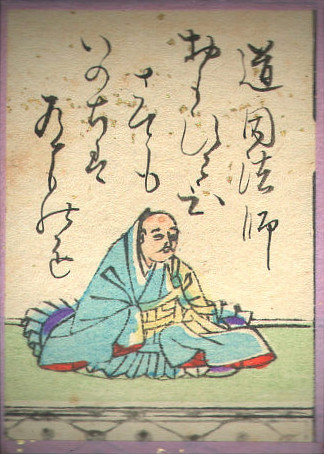
82.
Dōin Hōshi
道因法師

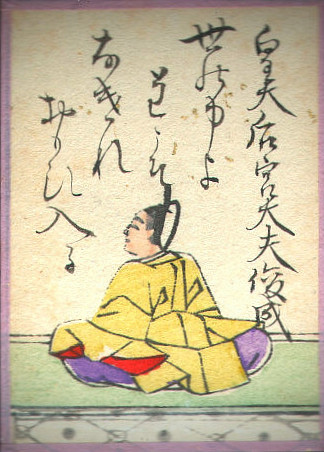
83.
Master of the Empress Dowager's Household Toshinari
皇太后宮大夫俊成

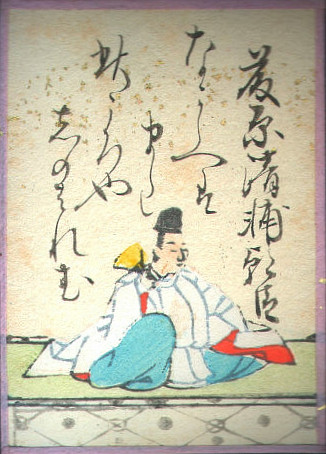
84.
Fujiwara no Kiyosuke Ason
藤原清輔朝臣

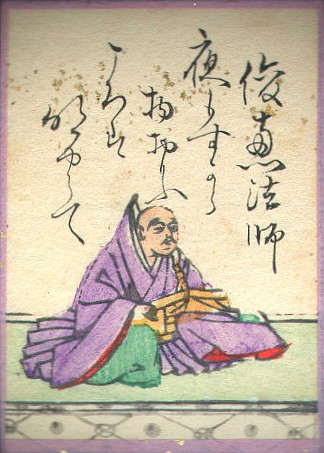
85.
Shun'e Hōshi
俊恵法師

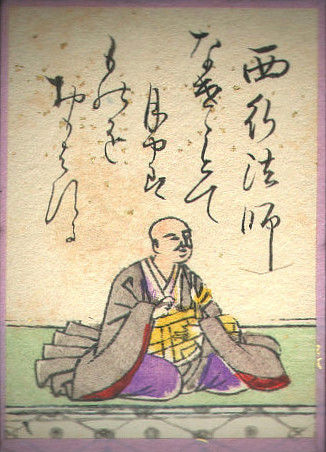
86.
Saigyō Hōshi
西行法師

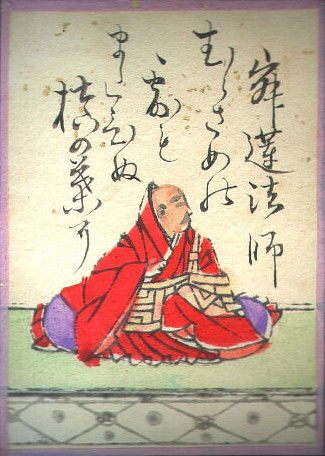
87.
Jakuren Hōshi
寂蓮法師

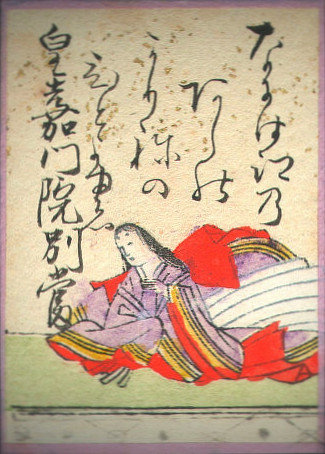
88.
Attendant to Empress Kōka
皇嘉門院別当

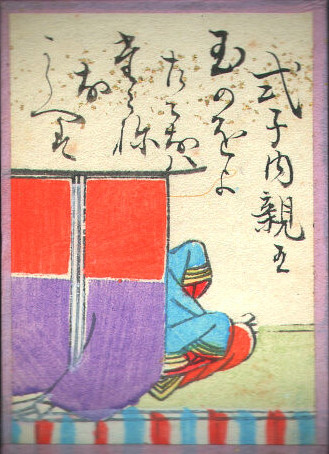
89.
Princess Shokushi
式子内親王

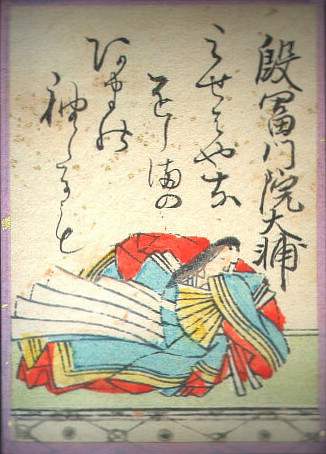
90.
Attendant to Empress Inpu
殷富門院大輔

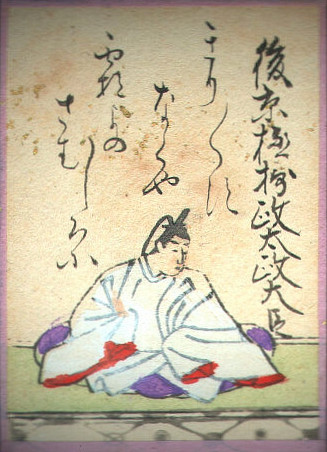
91.
Gokyōgoku Regent and former Chancellor of the Realm
後京極摂政前太政大臣

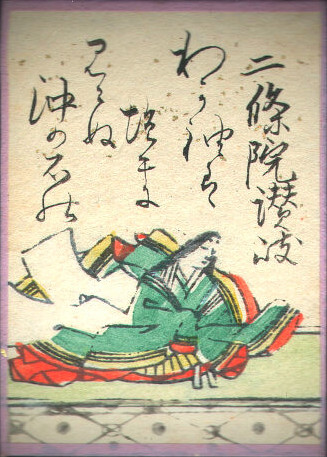
92.
Nijō In no Sanuki
二条院讃岐

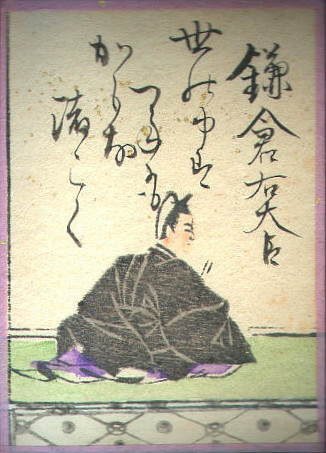
93.
Kamakura U-daijin
鎌倉右大臣

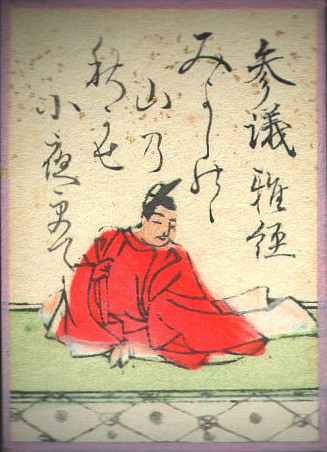
94.
Sangi Masatsune
参議雅経

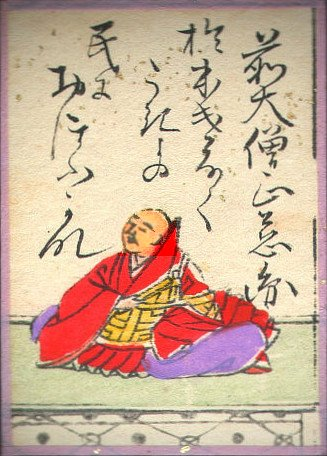
95.
Saki no Daisōjō Jien
前大僧正慈円

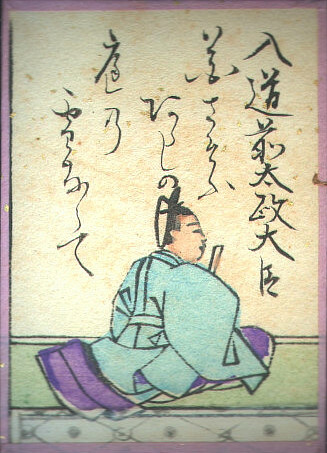
96.
Lay Novice and former Chancellor of the Realm
入道前太政大臣

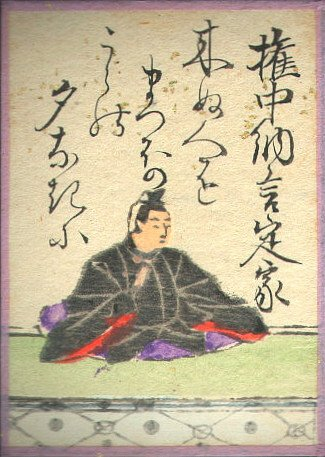
97.
Acting Chūnagon Sadaie
権中納言定家

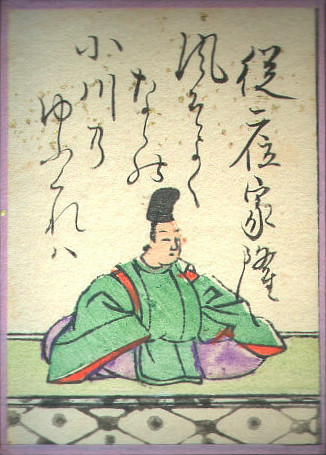
98.
Ju-nii Ietaka
従二位家隆

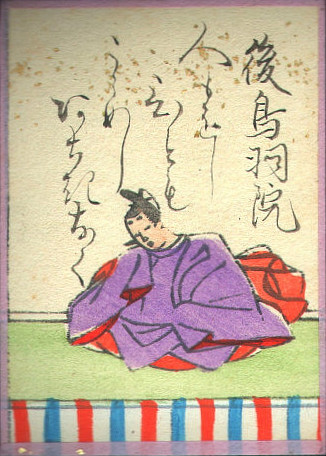
99.
Retired Emperor Go-Toba
後鳥羽院

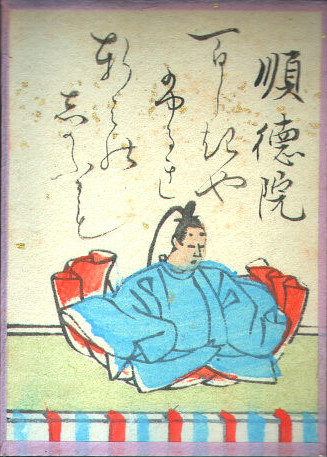
100.
Retired Emperor Juntoku
順徳院

== English translations ==
The Ogura Hyakunin Isshu has been translated into many languages and into English many times.

English translations include:

- F. V. Dickins, Hyaku-Nin-Isshu, or Stanzas by a Century of Poets (1866)
- Clay MacCauley, Hyakunin-isshu (Single Songs of a Hundred Poets), TASJ, 27(4), 1–152 (1899)
- Yone Noguchi, Hyaku Nin Isshu in English (1907)
- William N. Porter, A Hundred Verses from Old Japan (1909)
- Tom Galt, The Little Treasury of One Hundred People, One Poem Each (1982)
- Joshua S. Mostow, Pictures of the Heart: The Hyakunin Isshu in Word and Image (1996)
- Peter MacMillan, One Hundred Poets, One Poem Each: A Treasury of Classical Japanese Verse (2008; Penguin Classics, revised edition 2018)
- Emiko Miyashita and Michael Dylan Welch, 100 Poets: Passions of the Imperial Court (2008)
- Hideaki Nakano, WAKA WAKA 100 - Hyakunin Isshu (2023)

== Other Hyakunin Isshu anthologies ==
Many other anthologies compiled along the same criteria—one hundred poems by one hundred poets—include the words hyakunin isshu, notably the World War II-era Aikoku Hyakunin Isshu (愛国百人一首), or One Hundred Patriotic Poems by One Hundred Poets. Also important is Kyōka Hyakunin Isshu (狂歌百人一首), a series of parodies of the original Ogura collection.

== Card game ==
Teika's anthology is the basis for many karuta games (card games), which have been popular since the Edo period. A prominent example is Uta-garuta, the basis for competitive karuta (kyōgi karuta).

== See also ==
- Nisonin, Kyoto
- Shigureden, a museum in Kyoto about this subject
