= Inpumon'in no Taifu =

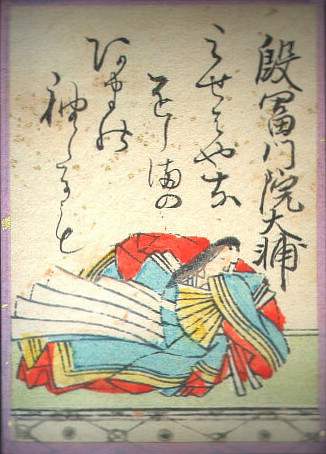
Inpu-mon'in no Taifu in the Ogura Hyakunin Isshu.

The Attendant to Empress Inpu (殷富門院大輔, Inpu-mon'in no Taifu; 1130–1200) was a Japanese noblewoman and waka poet in the Heian period. She was a daughter of Fujiwara no Nobunari, and, at court, served Princess Ryōshi (known as Inpu-mon'in as a nyoin or honorary empress emerita), a daughter of Emperor Go-Shirakawa.

Poetry was integral to this court, and noble courtiers were expected to be skilled poets; writing poetry was an essential part of entertainment, communication, and relationships. Inpu-mon'in no Taifu belonged to a particular poetry group which focused around the home of poet-monk Shun'e—an estate called "the Garden in the Poetic Forest". Members of the group held many poetry contests, for which she wrote many poems.

Her work appears in a large number of imperial poetry collections, including Shingoshūi Wakashū, Senzai Wakashū, Shokugosen Wakashū, Gyokuyō Wakashū, Shinsenzai Wakashū, Shinchokusen Wakashū, and others.

== Poetry ==
One of her poems is included in the Ogura Hyakunin Isshu:

見せばやな雄島のあまの袖だにも
ぬれにぞぬれし色はかはらず
misebaya na Ojima no ama no sode dani mo
nure ni zo nureshi iro wa kawarazu
If only I could show you—the ama of Ojima Island [dive all day], their sleeves soaked through, yet unchanged—[whereas mine, soaked in tears, glow with a sorrowful red!]
(Senzai Wakashū 14:886)
