= Taikenmon'in no Horikawa =

Japanese poet

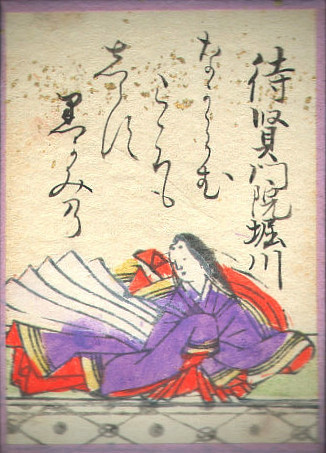
Taiken-mon'in no Horikawa in the Ogura Hyakunin isshu.

Lady Horikawa, attendant to Empress Taiken (待賢門院堀河, Taiken-mon'in no Horikawa; dates unknown) was a waka poet and Japanese noblewoman active in the Heian period.

As a poet, her work is also included in the Kin'yō Wakashū.

== Life ==
In 1142, she ordained as a Buddhist nun after the death of Empress Tamako. This is most likely to have been occurred when Emperor Sutoku was exiled, with her included. Tamako was the consort of Emperor Toba when she was to be better known under the name of Taiken-mon'in.

Horikawa was a member of the Minamoto clan as her father was Fujiwara no Kinzane, who was Dainagon at the time. She had one child named whom she named "Sutoku", also known as "Akihito." Her other name is assumed to be given to her when she served as a nun in the convent of the Imperial Board of Ceremonies.

== Poetry ==
One of her poems is included in the Ogura Hyakunin Isshu:

長からむ心もしらず黒髪の
みだれてけさは物をこそ思へ
nagakaran kokoro mo shirazu kurokami no
midarete kesa wa mono o koso omoe
I do not know how long my heart has been tangled; but, this late morning, my unruly black hair
lay in a state of insanity, and now, I am thinking of another...
(Senzai Wakashū 13:802)
