= Fujiwara no Atsutaka =

Japanese nobleman and waka poet (1060s–1120)

Fujiwara no Atsutaka (藤原 敦隆; 1060s–1120) was a Japanese nobleman and waka poet of the Heian period. His real name may have been Tachibana no Atsutaka.

== Life ==
Fujiwara no Atsutaka was a son of the governor of Hizen Province, Fujiwara no Toshikiyo (藤原俊清). His year of birth is unknown, but the Chūyūki's entry for the 27th day of the seventh month of Hōan 1 (22 August 1120 in the Julian calendar) says that he was in his fifties when he died earlier that same month.

The Sonpi Bunmyaku does not mention a "Fujiwara no Atsutaka", but it includes a reference to "Mokunosuke Atsutaka" (木工助敦隆), son of "Tachibana no Toshikiyo" (橘俊清). Atsutaka's court position was Mokunosuke (assistant director of the Mokuryō 木工寮), and his father's name was the same, so it is believed that these two were the same individual. (Note: The Nihon Jinmei Daijiten Plus article on Atsutaka does not go into as much detail on sources, etc., but states that his real clan name was not Fujiwara but Tachibana.)

The Chūyūki records that he was assigned to the Mokunosuke post in Eichō 1 (1096). He appears to have held this position until his death.

According to the Chūyūki, Atsutaka died on the first day of the seventh month of Hōan 1 (27 July 1120).

=== Descendants ===
His daughter married Minamoto no Toshiyori, and from this union was born Shun'e.

== Poetry ==
He participated in the Sanka Goban Uta-awase (山家五番歌合) in Tennin 3 (1110). Counting both "Tachibana no Atsutaka" and "Fujiwara no Atsutaka", his name appears in the surviving records of four uta-awase contests from this period. None of his poems, however, were included in any of the court anthologies.

He was also noted for his scholarship, and compiled the 20-volume Ruiju Koshū (類聚古集), a thematically arranged collection of Man'yōshū poems. Sixteen volumes of the work are extant.
