= Ukon =

Ukon may refer to different subjects:

- International Airport "Mykolaiv" (ICAO: UKON) — an airport in Mykolaiv, Ukraine
- Nunchaku — may refer to the "right" section of the nunchaku
- Takayama Ukon — a Christian daimyō during the Sengoku period of Feudal Japan
- Ukon (poet) — one of the Japanese Thirty-six Female Poetry Immortals
- Ukon (Naruto) — a character featured in the famous anime Naruto
- Turmeric — Japanese Turmeric used as a dietary supplement and spice
