= Gyōson =

Japanese monk and poet (c. 1056 – 1135)

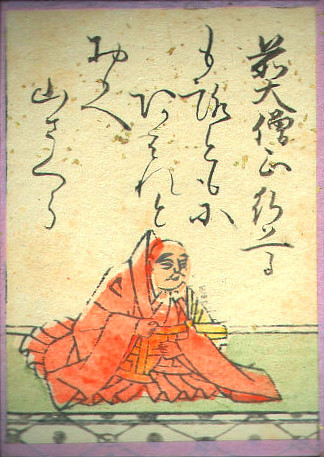
Prelate Gyōson (前大僧正行尊, Saki no Dai Sōjō Gyōson), from the Ogura Hyakunin Isshu.

Gyōson (行尊; 1055/1057—21 March 1135), also known as the Abbot of Byōdō-in (平等院大僧正, Byōdō-in Dai Sōjō), was a Japanese Tendai monk and waka poet of the late-Heian period. He became chief prelate of the Enryaku-ji temple in Kyoto, and one of his poems was included in the Ogura Hyakunin Isshu. Almost fifty of his poems were included in imperial anthologies, and he produced a private collection of poetry.

== Biography ==
Gyōson was born in 1055 or 1057, the son of Minamoto no Motohira (源基平).

At age twelve, he entered Mii-dera, eventually becoming its Abbot (園城寺長吏, Onjō-ji Chōri), and practiced the Shugendō austerities of the yamabushi for many years and made pilgrimages to various provinces. At age 25, he received the abhisheka (阿闍梨灌頂, ajari-kanjō) from Raigō (頼豪).

Later, in 1123, he rose to become Superior General of Enryaku-ji — the highest prelate of Tendai Buddhism. He also served as Grand Almoner to emperors Shirakawa and Toba.

He was known as the Abbot of Byōdō-in.

He died on 21 March 1135.

== Poetry ==
Forty-eight of his poems were included in imperial anthologies from the Kin'yō Wakashū on.

The following poem by him was included as No. 66 in Fujiwara no Teika's Ogura Hyakunin Isshu:

Japanese text	Romanized Japanese	English translation
もろともに あはれと思へ 山桜 花よりほかに 知る人もなし	Morotomo ni aware to omoe yama-zakura hana yori hoka ni shiru hito mo nashi	Mountain cherry, let us console each other. Of all those I know no one understands me the way your blossoms do.

His poetry records his experiences on pilgrimage, and was in later ages celebrated as a spiritual precursor to the works of Saigyō.

He also left a private collection, the Gyōson Daisōjō-shū (行尊大僧正集).

== Other arts ==
In addition to his poetry, he was also known as a skilled biwa performer and calligrapher.

== In later literature ==
As a high-ranking monk of noble birth, he appeared in many later setsuwa tales of the reigen-dan (霊験譚) genre.

== Bibliography ==
- McMillan, Peter. 2010 (1st ed. 2008). One Hundred Poets, One Poem Each. New York: Columbia University Press.
- Suzuki Hideo, Yamaguchi Shin'ichi, Yoda Yasushi. 2009 (1st ed. 1997). Genshoku: Ogura Hyakunin Isshu. Tokyo: Bun'eidō.
