= Fujiwara no Sanekata =

Japanese waka poet (d. 998)

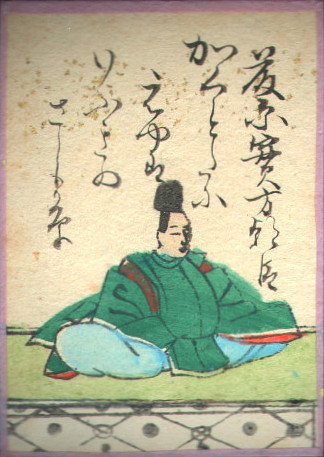
Fujiwara no Sanekata, from the Ogura Hyakunin Isshu.

Fujiwara no Sanekata (藤原実方; died 998) was a Japanese waka poet of the mid-Heian period. One of his poems was included in the Ogura Hyakunin Isshu. He left a private waka collection, the Sanekata-shū.

== Biography ==
Sanekata was a great-grandson of Fujiwara no Tadahira, "and commander of the bodyguard." He was raised by his uncle, Fujiwara no Naritoki (藤原済時).

He was reportedly a lover of Sei Shōnagon, and exchanged love poems with many women.

He was appointed governor of Mutsu Province, and he died while in service there.

He died in 998.

== Poetry ==
Sixty-seven of his poems were included in imperial anthologies from the Shūi Wakashū on, and he was listed as one of the Late Classical Thirty-Six Immortals of Poetry.

The following poem by him was included as No. 51 in Fujiwara no Teika's Ogura Hyakunin Isshu:

Japanese text	Romanized Japanese	English translation
かくとだに えやはいぶきの さしも草 さしも知らじな 燃ゆる思ひを	Kaku to dani e ya wa ibuki no sashimo-gusa sa shimo shiraji na moyuru omoi wo	Can I let you know what consumes me? Unknown to you, my heart blazes like red hot moxa aflame with love for you.

A private collection of his poetry, the Sanekata-shū (実方集), survives.

== Bibliography ==
- McMillan, Peter. 2010 (1st ed. 2008). One Hundred Poets, One Poem Each. New York: Columbia University Press. ISBN 9780231143998
- Suzuki Hideo, Yamaguchi Shin'ichi, Yoda Yasushi. 2009 (1st ed. 1997). Genshoku: Ogura Hyakunin Isshu. Tokyo: Bun'eidō.
