= Fujiwara no Mototoshi =

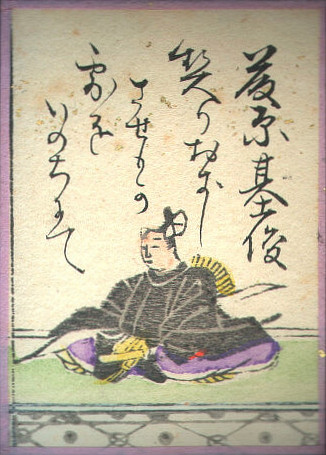
Fujiwara no Mototoshi in the Ogura Hyakunin isshu.

Fujiwara no Mototoshi (藤原 基俊, 1060–1142) was a waka poet and Japanese nobleman active in the Heian period. One of his poems is included in the Ogura Hyakunin Isshu. He served as Udaijin in the Heian administration.

Mototoshi was the compiler of the anthology Shinsen Rōeishū (新撰朗詠集), and his poems were included in the anthology Kin'yō Wakashū.
