= Dōin =

Japanese waka poet

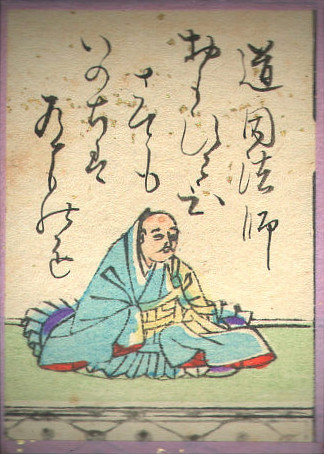
Priest Dōin (道因法師, Dōin-hōshi), from the Ogura Hyakunin Isshu

Dōin (道因, 1090 — c. 1179; given name Fujiwara no Atsuyori 藤原 敦頼) was a Japanese waka poet of the late-Heian period. One of his poems was included in the Ogura Hyakunin Isshu, and forty-one of his poems were included in imperial collections.

== Biography ==
He was born in 1090. His given name was Fujiwara no Atsuyori.

He served as Lieutenant of the Stables of the Left. He entered religion in 1172.

He died in around 1179.

== Poetry ==
Forty-one of his poems were included in imperial anthologies from the Senzai Wakashū on.

The following poem by him was included as No. 82 in Fujiwara no Teika's Ogura Hyakunin Isshu:

Japanese text

思ひわび
さても命は
あるものを
憂きにたへぬは
涙なりけり

Romanized Japanese

Omoi-wabi
sate mo inochi wa
aru monowo
uki ni taenu wa
namida nari keri

English translation

Despite this suffering
I somehow stay alive
yet with all this pain
of loving you
I cannot stop my sadness
nor the tears that flow.

His private collections have not survived.

== Bibliography ==
- Keene, Donald (1999). A History of Japanese Literature, Vol. 1: Seeds in the Heart — Japanese Literature from Earliest Times to the Late Sixteenth Century. New York: Columbia University Press. ISBN 978-0-231-11441-7.
- McMillan, Peter. 2010 (1st ed. 2008). One Hundred Poets, One Poem Each. New York: Columbia University Press.
- Suzuki Hideo, Yamaguchi Shin'ichi, Yoda Yasushi. 2009 (1st ed. 1997). Genshoku: Ogura Hyakunin Isshu. Tokyo: Bun'eidō.
