= Fujiwara no Sadayori =

Japanese poet (995–1045)

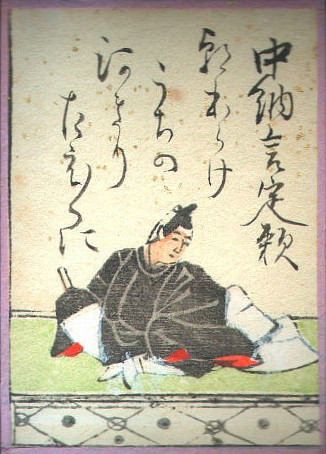
Fujiwara no Sadayori, from the Ogura Hyakunin Isshu.

Fujiwara no Sadayori (藤原定頼; 995-1045) was a Japanese waka poet of the mid-Heian period. One of his poems was included in the Ogura Hyakunin Isshu. He produced a private collection.

== Biography ==
He was the eldest son of Fujiwara no Kintō and, on his mother's side, a grandson of Emperor Murakami.

He served director for military affairs before becoming middle councilor. He was well known as both a poet and a calligrapher.

== Poetry ==
Forty-five of his poems were included in imperial anthologies, and he was listed as one of the Late Classical Thirty-Six Immortals of Poetry (中古三十六歌仙, Chūko Sanjū-Rokkasen).

The following poem by him was included as No. 64 in Fujiwara no Teika's Ogura Hyakunin Isshu:

Japanese text	Romanized Japanese	English translation
朝ぼらけ 宇治の川霧 たえだえに あらはれわたる 瀬々の網代木	Asaborake uji no kawa-giri tae-dae ni araware-wataru se-ze no ajiro-gi	As the fog rises and thins in patches, in the shallows appear stakes of the fishing nets— Winter, dawn, the Uji river.
