= Nijōin no Sanuki =

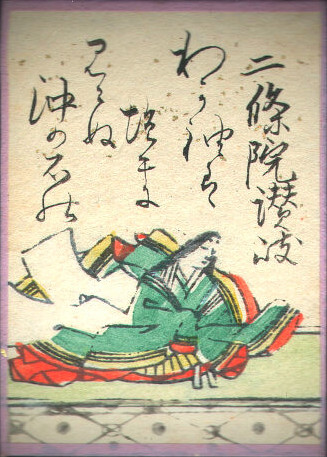
Nijoin no Sanuki in the Ogura Hyakunin isshu.

Lady Sanuki, attendant to retired Emperor Nijō (二条院讃岐, Nijō-in no Sanuki; c. 1141 – 1217) was a Japanese waka poet and noblewoman active in the late-Heian and early-Kamakura period. She was a contributor to the Senzai Wakashū anthology. A member of the Minamoto clan, she was also known as Chugu Sanuki (中宫讃岐).

== Poetry ==
One of her poems is included in the Ogura Hyakunin Isshu:

わか袖は塩干に見えぬ沖の石の
人こそしらねかはくまもなし
waga sode wa shiohi ni mienu oki no ishi no
hito koso shirane kawaku ma mo nashi
(based on Senzai Wakashū 12:760)
