= Ukon (poet) =

Japanese poet of the Heian period

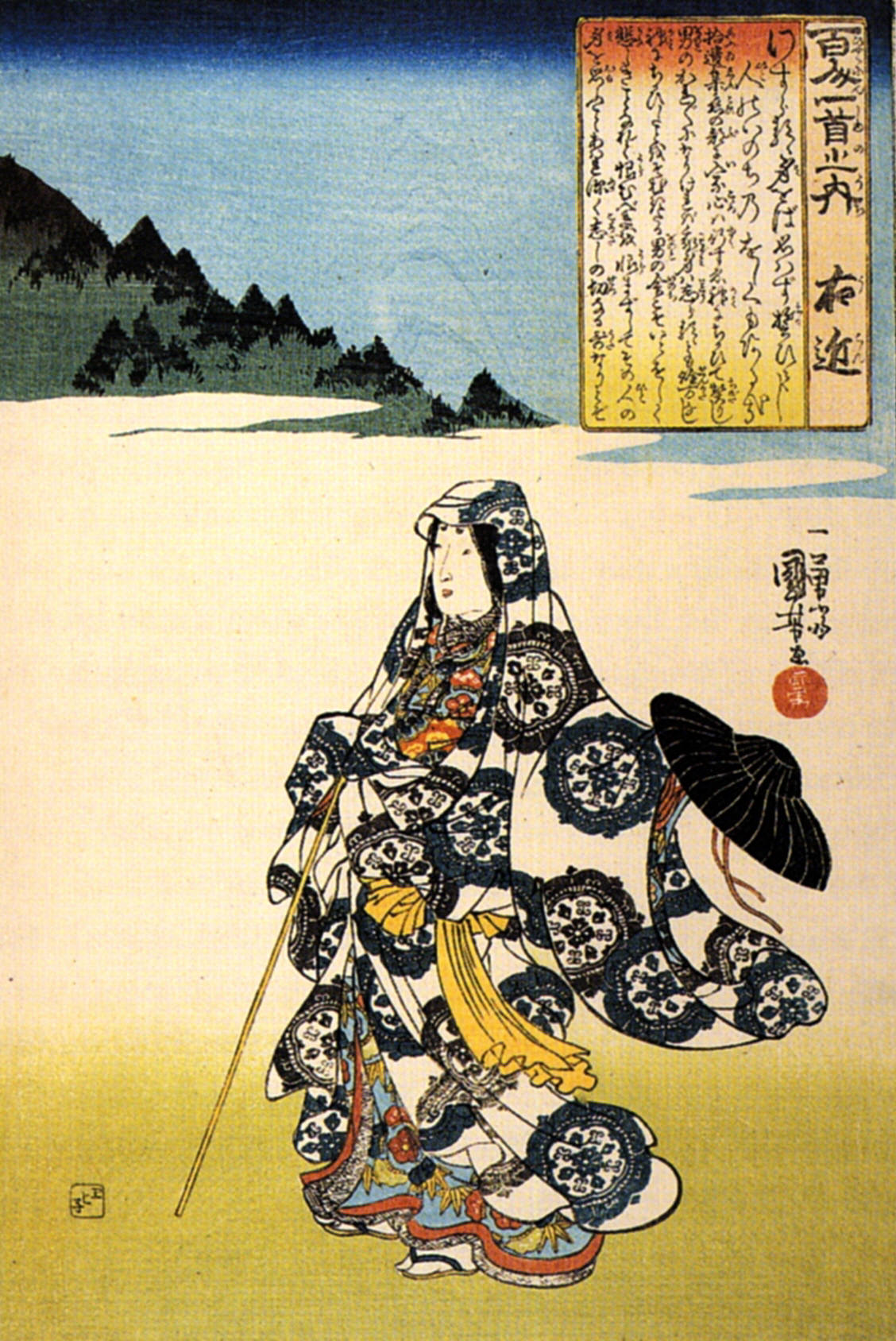
The poet Ukon walking in a mist cove, Hyakunin isshu, compiled by the poet Fujiwara no Teika, 1162-1241.

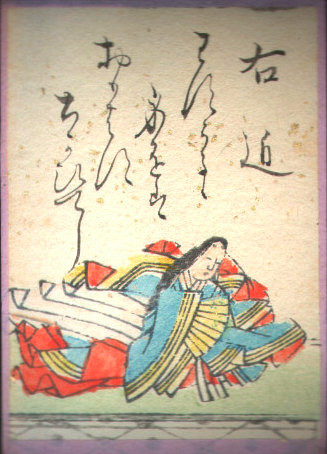
Ukon, from Ogura Hyakunin Isshu.

Ukon (右近) (fl. 936–966) was a Japanese poet of the Heian period. She was also a lady-in-waiting of Lady Onshi, consort of Emperor Daigo.

== Background ==
She belonged to the Fujiwara clan. Her father was Fujiwara no Suenawa, the right lesser captain (Japanese: Ukon no Shosho).

== Life ==
She was active as a poet for 30 years. In 933 she composed the poem for the coming-of-age celebration of Princess Koshi. In 960 and 962 she took part in a poetry contests of the court. In 966 she took part in a poetry contest held at the garden of the court. She exchanged poems with Prince Motoyoshi, Fujiwara no Atsutada, Fujiwara no Morosuke, Fujiwara no Morouji, Fujiwara no Asatada and Minamoto no Shitagō. Her name was included in the list of Thirty-six Female Poetry Immortals.

== Work ==
Her poems are included in the anthologies Hyakunin Isshu, Gosen Wakashū, and others.

Here is Poem No.38 from Hyakunin Isshu:

Wasuraruru
Mi woba omowazu
Chikahite-shi
Hito no inochi no
Oshiku mo aru kana.

Translation:

My broken heart I don't lament,
To destiny I bow;
But thou hast broken solemn oaths,—
I pray the Gods may now
Absolve thee from thy vow.

— Translated by William N. Porter, 1909

The Lady Ukon is supposed to have been deserted by her husband, and in this poem she regrets, not so much her own sorrow, as the fact that he has broken his sworn oath, and is therefore in danger of divine vengeance.
