= Fujiwara no Atsutada =

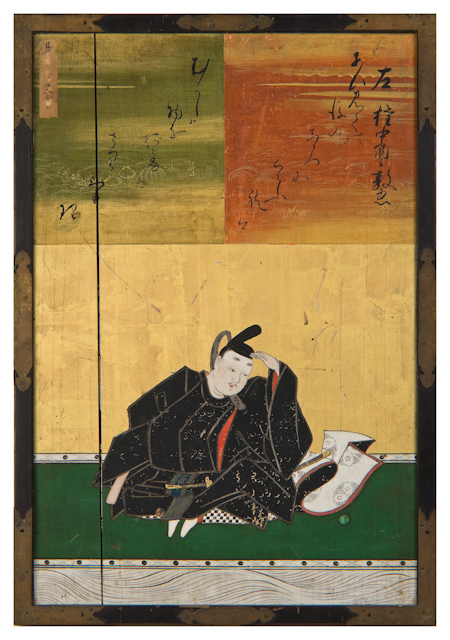
Acting Middle Counselor Atsutada (1648) by Kanō Naonobu

Fujiwara no Atsutada (藤原敦忠; 906 – April 18, 943) was a mid-Heian waka and Japanese nobleman.

He was designated a member of the Thirty-six Poetry Immortals, and was also known as the Hon'in Chūnagon (本院中納言) and Biwa Chūnagon (枇杷中納言).

He was the son of Fujiwara no Tokihira.

== Poetry ==
Many of Atsutada's poems written in correspondence with court women remain, and some are included in official poetry anthologies such as Gosen Wakashū.

One of his poems is included in the famous anthology Hyakunin Isshu:

逢ひ見ての後の心にくらぶれば
昔は物を思はざりけり
aimite no nochi no kokoro ni kurabureba
mukashi wa mono o omowazarikeri
(Shūi Wakashū 12:710)
