= Suō no Naishi =

Japanese poet

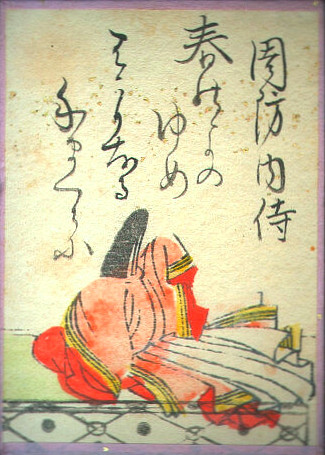
Court Handmaid Suō (周防内侍, Suō no Naishi), from the Ogura Hyakunin Isshu.

Suō no Naishi (周防内侍; dates unknown, but probably died around 1110; given name Taira no Nakako) was a Japanese waka poet of the late-Heian period. One of her poems was included in the Ogura Hyakunin Isshu, and thirty-five in imperial collections. She also produced a private waka collection, the Suō no Naishi-shū.

== Biography ==
The daughter of Taira no Munenaka (平棟仲), the governor of Suō Province, her date of birth is unknown. Her given name was Nakako (仲子).

She served as handmaiden (内侍, naishi) in the courts of four emperors, Go-Reizei, Go-Sanjō, Shirakawa and Horikawa.

In 1108, she took ordination as a Buddhist nun due to illness.

The date of her death is unknown, but she probably died around 1110.

== Poetry ==
Thirty-five of her poems were included in imperial anthologies from the Goshūi Wakashū on.

The following poem by her was included as No. 67 in Fujiwara no Teika's Ogura Hyakunin Isshu:

Japanese text	Romanized Japanese	English translation
春の夜の 夢ばかりなる 手枕に かひなく立たむ 名こそ惜しけれ	Haru no yo no yume bakari naru ta-makura ni kai naku tatan na koso oshikere	I would be sorry to lose my good name for laying my head upon your arm offered as a pillow for a moment fleeting as a spring night's dream.

She left a private collection, the Suō no Naishi-shū (周防内侍集).

== In other media ==
Famous woodblock print artist Utagawa Kuniyoshi produced a woodblock print illustrating one of her poems in the early 1840s.

== Bibliography ==
- McMillan, Peter. 2010 (1st ed. 2008). One Hundred Poets, One Poem Each. New York: Columbia University Press.
- Suzuki Hideo, Yamaguchi Shin'ichi, Yoda Yasushi. 2009 (1st ed. 1997). Genshoku: Ogura Hyakunin Isshu. Tokyo: Bun'eidō.
