= Sone no Yoshitada =

Japanese poet

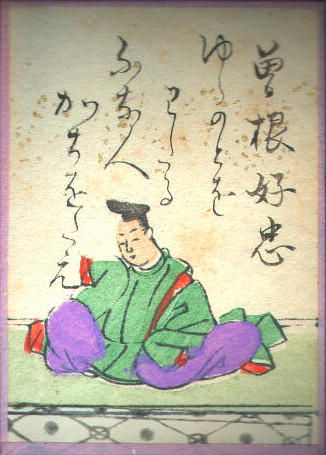
Sone no Yoshitada, from the Ogura Hyakunin Isshu.

Sone no Yoshitada (曾禰好忠) was a Japanese waka poet of the mid-Heian period. His exact dates of birth and death are unknown but he flourished in the second half of the tenth century. He was one of the Thirty-six Immortals of Poetry and one of his poems was included in the Ogura Hyakunin Isshu.

Because he was a secretary (掾, jō) of Tango Province he is occasionally known by the nicknames Sotango (曾丹後, a combination of the first character of his name with the name of the province) and Sotan (曾丹, a combination of the first characters of both his name and the province). He was known as an eccentric individual with numerous anecdotes told about him. He was not well regarded in his own time but later was recognized as a highly innovative poet, with roughly 90 of his poems appearing in imperial anthologies.

The following poem by him was No. 46 in Fujiwara no Teika's Ogura Hyakunin Isshu:

Japanese text	Romanized Japanese	English translation
由良のとを 渡る舟人 かぢをたえ 行くへも知らぬ 恋の道かな	Yura no to wo wataru funa-bito kaji-wo tae yukue mo shiranu koi no michi kana	Crossing the Straits of Yura the boatman lost the rudder. The boat's adrift not knowing where it goes. Is the course of love like this?

== Bibliography ==
- McMillan, Peter. 2010 (1st ed. 2008). One Hundred Poets, One Poem Each. New York: Columbia University Press.
- Suzuki Hideo, Yamaguchi Shin'ichi, Yoda Yasushi. 2009 (1st ed. 1997). Genshoku: Ogura Hyakunin Isshu. Tokyo: Bun'eidō.
