= Fun'ya no Yasuhide =

Japanese Heian period poet

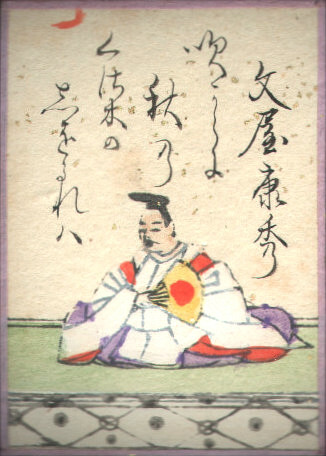
Fun'ya no Yasuhide (from the Hyakunin Isshu)

Fun'ya no Yasuhide, also Bunya no Yasuhide (文屋 康秀, birth date unknown – death 885?), also known by his nickname Bunrin (文琳) was an early Heian period poet, included in the Rokkasen. He attained Senior Sixth Rank, Upper Grade.

In the Kokinshū's Kanajo (Japanese preface), Yasuhide is described as "Yasuhide used words skillfully, but his words do not match the content. His poetry is like a merchant dressed up in elegant clothes." Five of his poems are included in the Kokinshū and one of his poems is included in the Goshūi wakashū. He was involved in a relationship with Ono no Komachi and it is even said that when he received his appointment to Mikawa, he invited her to go with him.

He was the father of Fun'ya no Asayasu.

His poem in the Hyakunin Isshu is No. 22:

Japanese text

吹くからに
秋の草木の
しをるれば
むべ山風を
嵐といふらむ

Romanized Japanese

Fuku kara ni
aki no kusaki no
shiorureba
mube yamakaze wo
arashi to iuran

English translation

As soon as it blows,
the autumn trees and grasses
droop, and this must be why,
quite rightly, the mountain wind
is called “the ravager.”

Translation by Dr Joshua Mostow.
