= Harumichi no Tsuraki =

Japanese poet

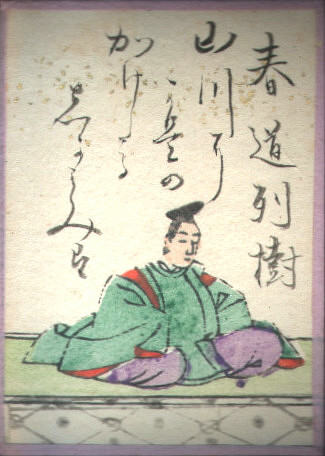
Harumichi no Tsuraki, in Ogura Hyakunin Isshu.

Harumichi no Tsuraki (春道列樹, died 920) was a poet who lived in the mid-Heian period. His father was Harumichi no Niina, a descendant of the Mononobe clan.

Very little of his life is known. In 910 he graduated from literary composition and in 920 he was appointed as governor of Iki Province, but died before taking office.

Of his works, three waka belonging to him were included in the imperial anthology Kokin Wakashū and two in the Gosen Wakashū. One was also included in the anthology Ogura Hyakunin Isshu.
