= Shun'e =

Japanese poet (1113 – c. 1191)

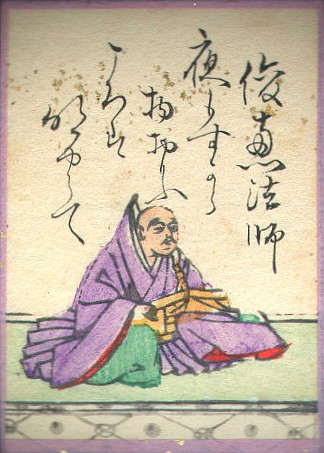
Shun'e, from the Ogura Hyakunin Isshu.

Shun'e (俊恵, also read Sun'e; 1113 – c. 1191), also known as Tayū no Kimi (大夫公), was a Japanese waka poet of the late-Heian period. One of his poems was included in the Ogura Hyakunin Isshu. He produced a private collection, the Rin'yō Wakashū, and was listed as one of the Late Classical Thirty-Six Immortals of Poetry.

== Name ==
His Buddhist name is also read Sun'e, and he is also known by the name Tayū no Kimi.

== Biography ==
He was born in 1113, the son of Minamoto no Toshiyori. His maternal grandfather was Fujiwara no Atsutaka. He was tutored in waka composition by his father, but after the latter died he appears to have taken monastic orders in Tōdai-ji. His exact date of death is uncertain, but it was likely around 1191.

== Poetry ==
Eighty-three of his poems were included in imperial anthologies, and he was recognized as one of the Late Classical Thirty-Six Immortals of Poetry.

He was a poetic mentor to Kamo no Chōmei.

The following poem by him was included as No. 85 in Fujiwara no Teika's Ogura Hyakunin Isshu:

Japanese text	Romanized Japanese	English translation
夜もすがら もの思ふころは 明けやらで 閨のひまさへ つれなかりけり	Yomosugara mono-omou koro wa akeyarade neya no hima sae tsurenakarikeri	The only relief from the pain of waiting all night long for a lover who does not come would be the break of day, but even gaps in the shutters are too cruel to let in the light of dawn.

He also left a private collection, the Rin'yō Wakashū (林葉和歌集).
