= Ryōzen =

Japanese poet (998–1064)

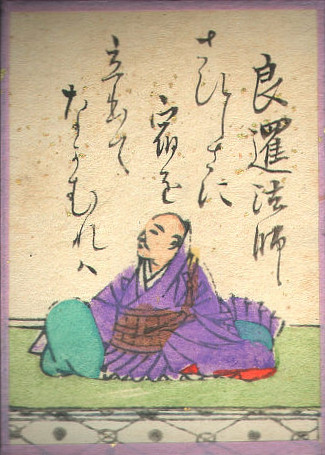
Priest Ryōzen (良暹, Ryōzen-hōshi), from the Ogura Hyakunin Isshu.

Ryōzen (良暹, dates unknown, but flourished c. 998—1064) was a Japanese waka poet of the mid-Heian period. One of his poems was included in the Ogura Hyakunin Isshu, and thirty-one of his poems were included in imperial anthologies from the Goshūi Wakashū on.

== Biography ==
Although his exact birth and death dates are unknown, he flourished around 998 to 1064.

A Tendai monk at Hiei-zan, he later became abbot (別当, bettō) of the Gion Monastery. He lived as a hermit at Ōhara (Japanese Wikipedia) and then, late in life, at Unrin'in (雲林院, Japanese Wikipedia).

== Poetry ==
Thirty-one of his poems were included in imperial anthologies from the Goshūi Wakashū on.

The following poem by him was included as No. 70 in Fujiwara no Teika's Ogura Hyakunin Isshu:

Japanese text	Romanized Japanese	English translation
さびしさに 宿を立ち出でて ながむれば いづこも同じ 秋の夕暮れ	Sabishisa ni yado wo tachi-idete nagamureba izuku mo onaji aki no yuugure	Lonely, I step outside my hut and look vacantly around: It's the same all over— Autumn dusk!

== Bibliography ==
- Keene, Donald (1999). A History of Japanese Literature, Vol. 1: Seeds in the Heart — Japanese Literature from Earliest Times to the Late Sixteenth Century. New York: Columbia University Press. ISBN 978-0-231-11441-7.
- McMillan, Peter. 2010 (1st ed. 2008). One Hundred Poets, One Poem Each. New York: Columbia University Press.
- Suzuki Hideo, Yamaguchi Shin'ichi, Yoda Yasushi. 2009 (1st ed. 1997). Genshoku: Ogura Hyakunin Isshu. Tokyo: Bun'eidō.
