= Fun'ya no Asayasu =

Japanese poet

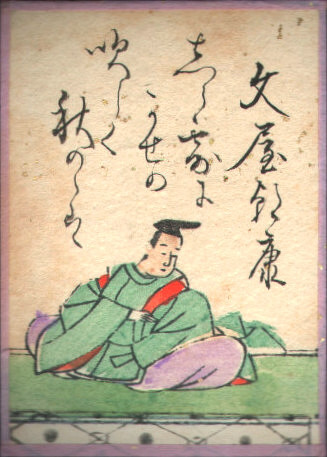
Fun'ya no Asayasu, in Ogura Hyakunin Isshu.

Fun'ya no Asayasu, also Bunya no Asayasu, (文屋朝康, end of the 9th century — beginning of 10th century) was a Japanese poet of Heian period.

He was the son of Fun'ya no Yasuhide.

His poem in the Hyakunin Isshu is No. 37:

Shira tsuyu ni
Kaze no fukishiku
Aki no no wa
Tsuranuki-tomenu
Tama zo chiri keru.

This lovely morn the dewdrops flash
Like diamonds on the grass—
A blaze of sparkling jewels! But
The autumn wind, alas!
Scatters them as I pass.

—Translated by William N. Porter, 1909

He is said to have composed this verse at the request of the Emperor Daigo in the year 900.
