= Kōkamonin no Bettō =

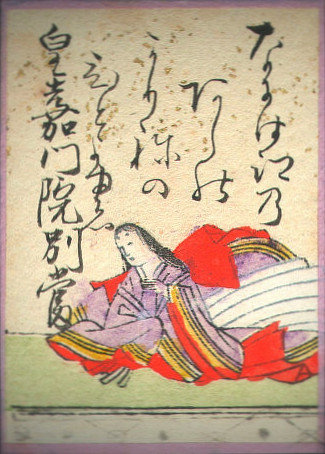
Kōkamonin no Bettō in the Ogura Hyakunin isshu.

The Attendant to Empress Kōka (皇嘉門院別当, Kōka-mon'in no Bettō; dates unknown) fl. 12th century CE, was a waka poet and Japanese noblewoman active in the Heian period. She was a daughter of Minamoto no Toshitaka (源俊隆), making her a member of the Minamoto clan, but her given name is unknown.

She was a lady of the Empress Kōkamon'in, wife of Emperor Sutoku.

== Poetry ==
One of her poems is included in the Ogura Hyakunin Isshu:

難波江の蘆のかりねのひと夜ゆゑ
身をつくしてや恋ひわたるべき
Naniwa-e no ashi no karine no hitoyo yue
mi o tsukushite ya koiwataru beki
(Senzai Wakashū 13:807)
