= Minamoto no Kanemasa =

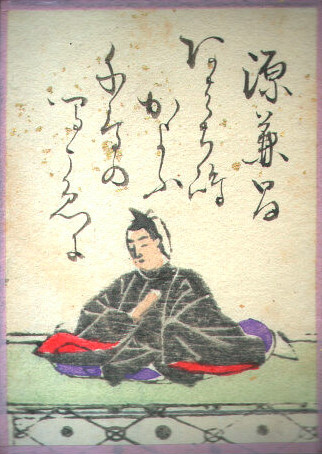
Minamoto no Kanemasa in the Ogura Hyakunin isshu

Minamoto no Kanemasa (源 兼昌, dates unknown) was a waka poet and Japanese nobleman active in the Heian period. One of his poems is included in the Ogura Hyakunin Isshu. A member of the Minamoto clan, his work is also included in the Kin'yō Wakashū and the Shinsenzai Wakashū.
