= Minamoto no Shunrai =

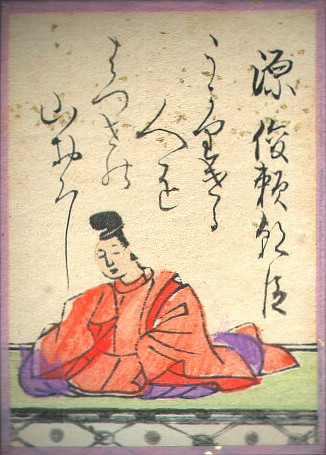
Minamoto no Toshiyori as pictured in the Ogura Hyakunin Isshu.

Minamoto no Shunrai also Minamoto Toshiyori (源 俊頼; 1055 – January 29, 1129) was an important and innovative Japanese poet, who compiled the Kin'yō Wakashū. He was the son of Minamoto no Tsunenobu (1016–1097); holder of the second rank in court and of the position of Grand Counsellor). Shunrai was favored by Emperor Go-Sanjo and to a lesser degree Emperor Shirakawa; in no small part for political reasons. At this time, the Fujiwara family dominated the country, and its branch, the Rokujō family, similarly dominated the court poetry scene; by favoring their rivals, the Emperors could thus strike back. Although Shunrai was passed over to compile the Goshūi Wakashū, Shunrai's angry polemical Nan Goshūi ("Errors in the Goshūishū") appears to have somehow convinced Shirakawa to have Shunrai compile the next imperial anthology, the Kin'yō Wakashū. This anthology, when completed, embroiled Shunrai in dispute, and his Kin'yo Wakashū was especially criticized with various uncomplimentary nicknames; Brower and Miner mention that one critic, Fujiwara no Akinaka (fl. 1100-1125) wrote a now-lost ten-part work called the Ryōgyokushū ("Collection of Genuine Jewels") which did nothing but mock and criticize the Kin'yō Wakashū.

In 1113, Toshiyori wrote the poetic treatise known as "Toshiyori zuinō (俊頼髄脳)." Zuinō, which is also seen in the title of Fujiwara no Kintō's poetic treatise the "Shinsen zuinō," can be translated literally as myelencephalon, but this term was used to refer to books that contained essays on poetry and figuratively means that it knows the "mind" of poetry.
