= Minamoto no Hitoshi =

Japanese poet (880–951)

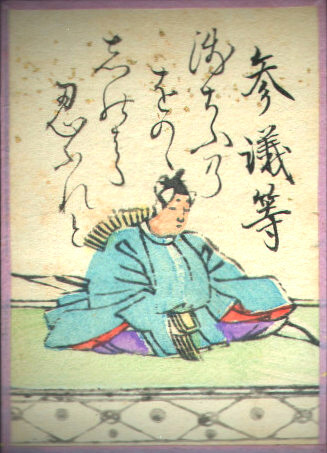
Minamoto no Hitoshi, from the Ogura Hyakunin Isshu.

Minamoto no Hitoshi (源等, 880–951) was a Japanese waka poet of the mid-Heian period. One of his poems was included in the Ogura Hyakunin Isshu.

== Biography ==
Hitoshi was born in 880, a son of Minamoto no Mare (源希) and great-grandson of Emperor Saga.

After serving as governor of several provinces, in 947 he was appointed Sangi Counselor with Fourth Court Rank (正四位下参議, shō shii no ge sangi).

== Poetry ==
Four of his poems were included in Gosen Wakashū on.

The following poem by him was included as No. 39 in Fujiwara no Teika's Ogura Hyakunin Isshu:

| Japanese text | Romanized Japanese | English translation |
| 浅茅生の 小野の篠原 しのぶれど あまりてなどか 人の恋しき | Asajiu no ono no shinohara shinoburedo amarite nado ka hito no koishiki | Though I scarcely show my secret feelings like those few reeds sprouting unnoticed in low bamboo, they are too much for me to hide. Why do I love you so? |

== Bibliography ==
- Keene, Donald (1999). A History of Japanese Literature, Vol. 1: Seeds in the Heart — Japanese Literature from Earliest Times to the Late Sixteenth Century. New York: Columbia University Press. ISBN 978-0-231-11441-7.
- McMillan, Peter. 2010 (1st ed. 2008). One Hundred Poets, One Poem Each. New York: Columbia University Press.
- Suzuki Hideo, Yamaguchi Shin'ichi, Yoda Yasushi. 2009 (1st ed. 1997). Genshoku: Ogura Hyakunin Isshu. Tokyo: Bun'eidō.
