= Fujiwara no Kintō =

Japanese poet and bureaucrat (966–1041)

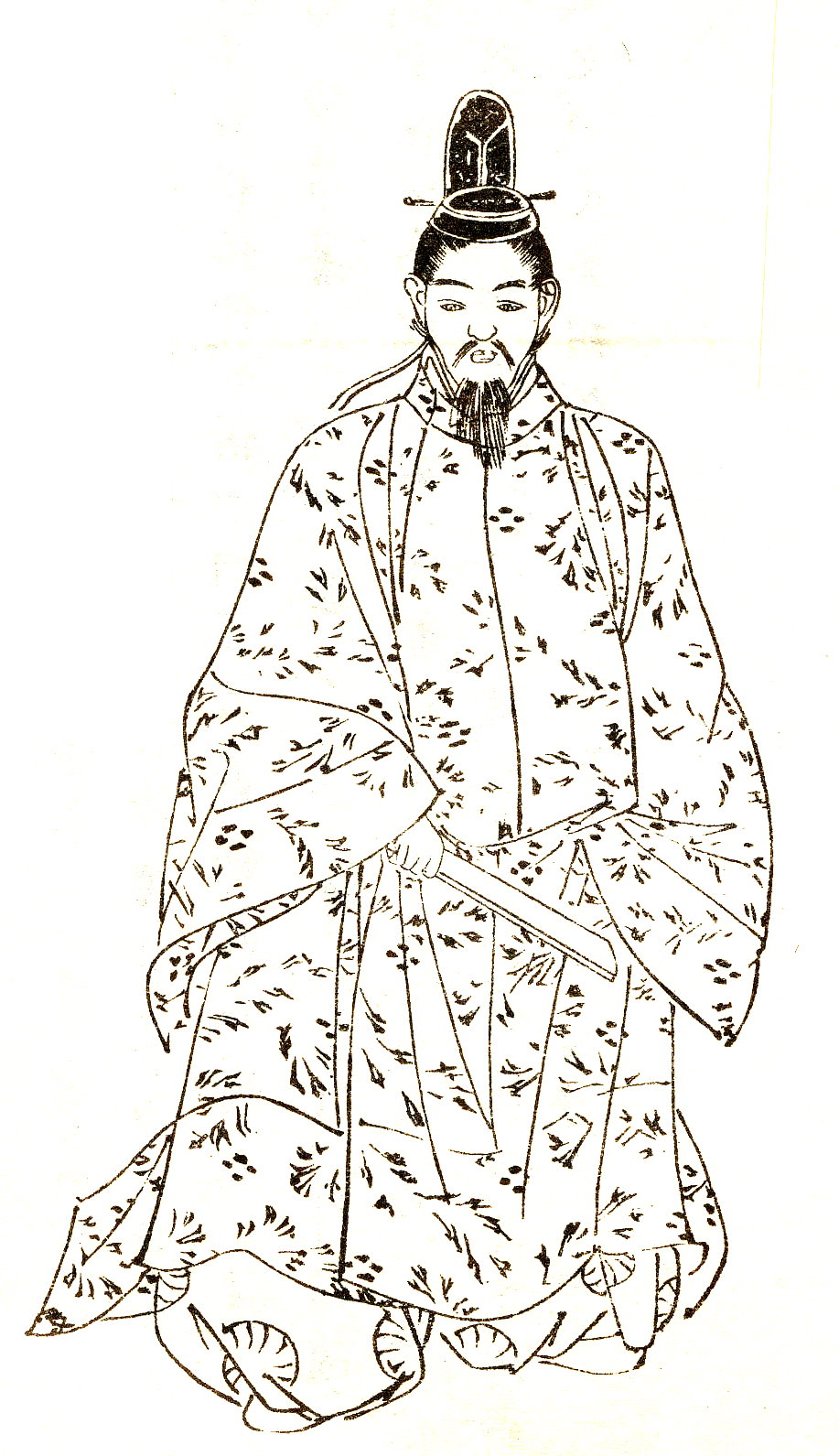
Fujiwara no Kintō by Kikuchi Yōsai

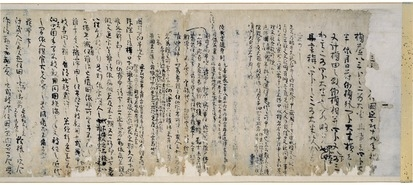
Anthology of customs, ceremony rules. and political systems (KOKUZAN SHO), Ms. by author himself. Autograph of Fujiwara no Kintō

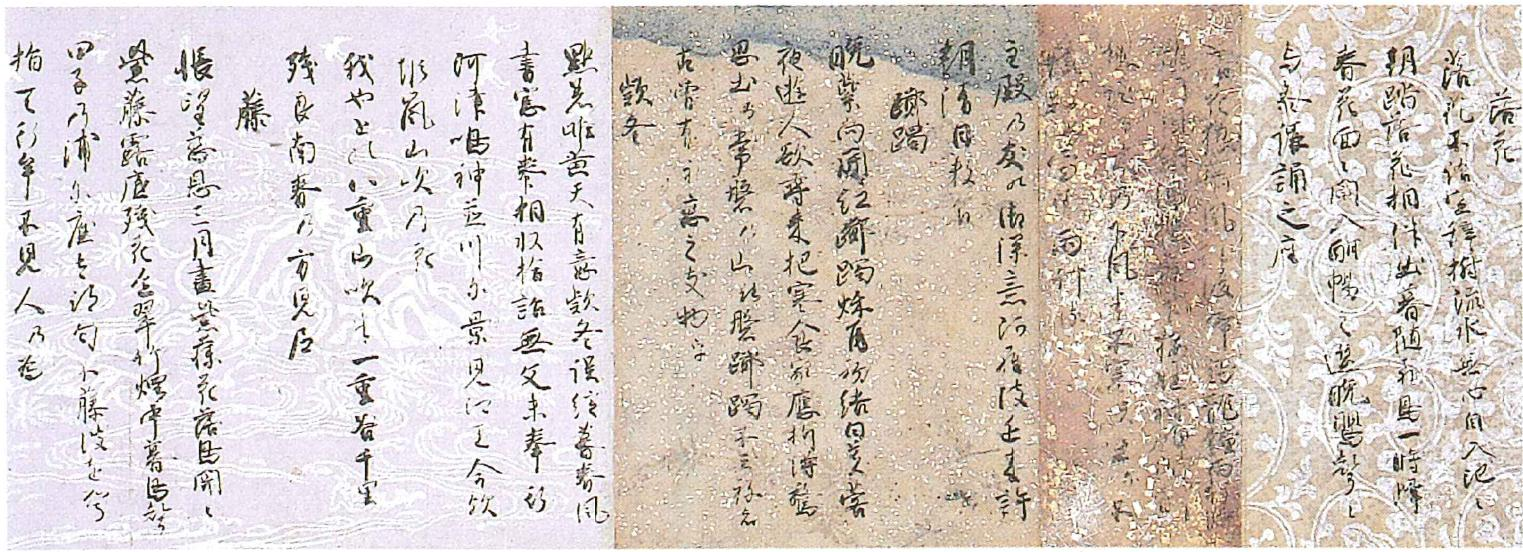
Poems from the anthology Wakan rōeishū, Text by Fujiwara no Kintō, Calligrapher is unknown early 12th century

Fujiwara no Kintō (藤原 公任; 966 – February 4, 1041), also known as Shijō-dainagon, was a Japanese poet, admired by his contemporaries and a court bureaucrat of the Heian period. His father was the regent Fujiwara no Yoritada and his son Fujiwara no Sadayori. An exemplary calligrapher and poet, he is mentioned in works by Murasaki Shikibu, Sei Shōnagon and in a number of other major chronicles and texts.

== Biography ==
Kintō wrote a great many poems, as well as many poetry anthologies including the Shūi Wakashū and the Wakan rōeishū. He also established the grouping of "Thirty-Six Poetic Geniuses" or "Thirty-Six Immortals of Poetry", the "Anthology of Poems by the Thirty-Six Poets" (Sanjūrokkasen), frequently seen in Ukiyo-e art; he first assembled in 1009–1011 which Fujiwara no Teika would later recommend to study by aspiring poets. The anthology:

"...contained ten poems each by Hitomaro, Tsurayuki, Mitsune, Ise, Kanemori, and Nakatsukasa, and three poems each by Yakamochi, Akahito, Narihira, Henjô, Sosei, Tomonori, Sarumaru, Komachi, Kanesuke, Asatada, Atsutada, Takamitsu, Kintada, Tadamine, Saigû no Nyôgo, Yorimoto, Toshiyuki, Shigeyuki, Muneyuki, Sane-akira, Kiyotada, Shitagô, Okikaze, Motosuke, Korenori, Motozane, Kodai no Kimi (also read O-ô no Kimi), Nakafumi, Yoshinobu, and Tadami. He served the Heian court in the position of nagon at the same time as Minamoto no Tsunenobu, Minamoto no Toshikata, and Fujiwara no Yukinari, all great poets as well. The four have come to be known as the Shi-nagon (four nagon)."

He was also apparently vital in the compilation of Emperor Kazan's Shūi Wakashū (in which 15 of his poems appear), having compiled between 996 and 999 the original skeleton for it, a collection called Shuisho.

== Notes ==
6. For a complete translation and study of the Wakan rōeishū, see J. Thomas Rimer and Jonathan Chaves, JAPANESE AND CHINESE POEMS TO SING, Columbia University Press, 1997. This book was the winner of the 1998 US-Japan Friendship Commission Prize for best translation of a work of Japanese literature.
