= Minamoto no Muneyuki =

Japanese poet and nobleman (d. 939)

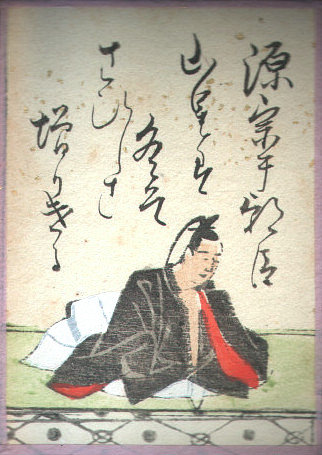
Minamoto no Muneyuki, from the Ogura Hyakunin Isshu.

Minamoto no Muneyuki (Japanese: 源 宗于 also 源宗于朝臣 Minamoto no Muneyuki Ason) (?-939) was an early Heian waka poet and nobleman. He was a grandson of Emperor Kōkō.

In 894, he was reduced to being a commoner, holding a few provincial governorships. However, in 939, he was appointed as a magistrate and died shortly after.

He is designated a member of the Thirty-six Poetry Immortals, and one of his poems is included in the famous anthology Hyakunin Isshu (Poem 28). In total, we find 15 of his poems in the Japanese Imperial anthologies, 6 of which can be found in the Kokin Wakashū.

His remaining works include a poetry collection known as the Muneyukishū (宗于集).
