= Minamoto no Shigeyuki =

Early Heian waka poet and nobleman (died 1000)

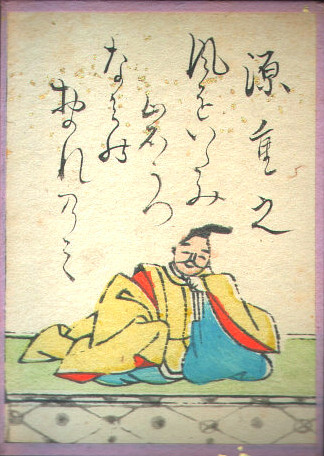
Minamoto no Shigeyuki, from the Ogura Hyakunin Isshu.

Minamoto no Shigeyuki (Japanese: 源 重之) (died 1000) was an early Heian waka poet and nobleman. He was designated a member of the Thirty-six Poetry Immortals and one of his poems is included in the famous anthology Hyakunin Isshu. His remaining works include a poetry collection known as the Shigeyukishū (重之集).
