= Kin'yō Wakashū =

The Kin'yō Wakashū (金葉和歌集; "Collection of Golden Leaves"), sometimes abbreviated as Kin'yōshū, is the fifth Japanese imperial anthology of waka whose two drafts were finished in 1124 and 1127. It was compiled at the behest of the Retired Emperor Shirakawa, by Minamoto no Shunrai (~1055–1129; sometimes called Toshiyori) It consists of ten volumes containing 716 poems.

Shunrai introduced three distinct versions of his collection, each yielding different outcomes. The first version, known as shodobon (初度本), predominantly featured poets from the earliest three imperial anthologies—Kokinshu, Gosenshu, and Shuishu—reflecting a conservative approach. However, it failed to gain attention from the court. The second version, Nidobon (二度本), encompassed poets from the contemporary period of compilation. Despite facing rejection from Shirawaka, it emerged as the most widely disseminated edition. The third version, Sansōbon (三奏本), struck a balance between the conservatism of the first version and the contemporaneity of the second. Although formally accepted by Shirawaka, its dissemination through the court was hindered by the untimely deaths of both Shunrai and Shirakawa, occurring just two years after its approval.

The Kin'yō Wakashū is one of the shortest anthologies. Shunrai's unusually liberal and innovative tastes were disliked by Shirakawa, and thus Shirakawa rejected "at least two drafts". The final compromise is nevertheless remarkably contemporary and descriptive.

== Interpretation ==
The political fragmentation in the first half of the twelfth century exerted a prominent degree of imperial influence on compilation, aimed at protecting political and cultural power. These influences can be observed in the Kin'yō Wakashū emphasis on contemporaneity and its structural divergence from the previous four anthologies. Instead of comprising twenty volumes, it consists of only ten. These ten volumes are classified into Spring, Summer, Autumn, Winter, Celebration, Separation, Love, and Miscellaneous categories. Kin'yō Wakashū is regarded as innovative for several reasons. It embraces a style that relies more on description, resulting in a remarkably increased descriptive style in the poems. Furthermore, renga makes its first appearance at the end of Kin'yō Wakashū. The inclusion of renga in Kin'yō Wakashū is seen as the beginning of renga discourse.

=== Seasonal Topics ===
The theme of the four seasons is prominent throughout all imperial anthologies, with the organization of seasonal poems in the Kokinshu serving as a template for subsequent series. Notably, the theme of autumn often dominates over the other seasons. For instance, in Kin'yō Wakashū, out of 325 seasonal poems compiled, 109 are devoted to autumn.

The seasonal identity is largely shaped by cultural influences, with topics associated with each season shifting and consolidating over the progression of compiling analogies. For example, while yellow valerian was a popular topic in Kokinshu, it did not make an appearance in Kin'yō Wakashū. Conversely, the topic of the moon appears across all seasons but becomes specifically associated with autumn by the era of Kin'yō Wakashū.

=== Buddhist Waka ===
Buddhist waka in the Kin'yō Wakashū are located within the final volume, Miscellaneous, even though this volume does not exclusively focus on Buddhist themes. Within these poems, two significant characteristics stand out although there is no comprehensive arrangement of the Buddhist waka sequences within the collection. Firstly, they often exhibit a strong devotion to topics rooted in the teachings of the Pure Land. Secondly, there is a notable abundance of poems attributed to Buddhist priests and Shinto priestesses.
