= Minamoto no Tsunenobu =

Japanese nobleman (1016–1097)

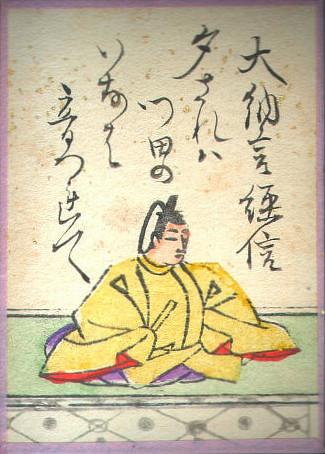
Minamoto no Tsunenobu in the Ogura Hyakunin isshu

Minamoto no Tsunenobu (源経信, 1016–1097) was a Japanese nobleman and waka poet in the Heian period. One of his poems is included in the Ogura Hyakunin Isshu, in which he is known as Dainagon Tsunenobu (大納言経信).
