= Shūi Wakashū =

3rd anthology of Japanese waka poetry (compiled c. 1005)

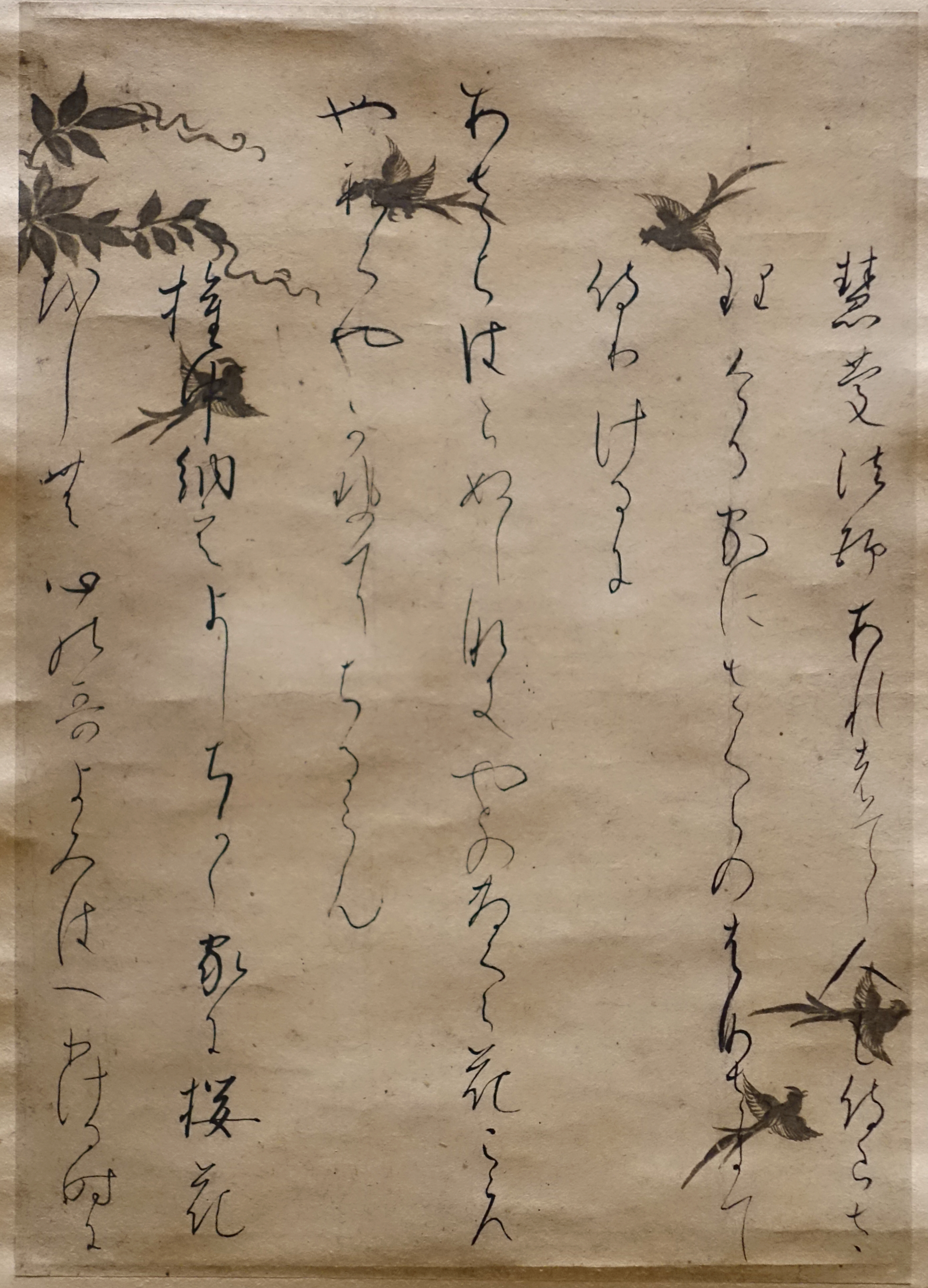
Shūi Wakashū segment by Fujiwara no Sadazane

The Shūi Wakashū (拾遺和歌集; "Collection of Gleanings"), often abbreviated as Shūishū, is the third imperial anthology of waka from Heian period Japan. It was compiled by Emperor Kazan in about 1005. Its twenty volumes contain 1,351 poems. The details of its publication and compilation are unclear.

The Shūishū was an expansion of Fujiwara no Kintō's earlier anthology, the Shūishō (拾遺抄; "Selection of Gleanings"), compiled between 996 and 999. Until the early nineteenth century, it was mistakenly believed that the Shūishō was a selection of the best poems from the Shūishū, and so the former was more highly regarded.

The second poem from the 'lost' poetic sequence of Priest Manzei can be found in this anthology.

== Bibliography ==
- Cranston, Edwin A., 1993. A Waka Anthology, Volume Two: Grasses of Remembrance. Palo Alto : Stanford University Press. ISBN 978-0-804-74825-4.
- Keene, Donald, 1999. Seeds in the Heart: A History of Japanese Literature, Volume 1. New York: Columbia University Press. ISBN 978-0-231-11441-7.
