= Fukuro zōshi =

Japanese poetic commentary

Fukuro zōshi (袋草紙) is a waka commentary text written by Fujiwara no Kiyosuke in the late 1150s. It is composed of two volumes with 851 poems. The Fukuro zōshi was not only an encyclopedia of proper etiquette at poetic events, but also of poetic knowledge. The first book covered the procedures of courtly poetry gatherings based on established precedents and included anecdotes about court poets, while the second book focused on uta-awase. It was presented to Emperor Nijō in 1159.

== Background ==
By the mid-12th century in which the Fukuro zōshi was produced, poetry had become a professional endeavour that was divided into houses that vied for favour among powerful members of the Fujiwara clan, who could offer their patronage as well as economic and political support to male poets. Fujiwara no Kiyosuke was a member of the Rokujō family, a conservative poetic "house" founded by his grandfather Fujiwara no Akisue, and inherited the house's leadership after the death of his father Fujiwara no Akisuke, in 1155. Kiyosuke authored over a dozen poetic texts, of which Fukuro zōshi was the most wide-reaching.

Fujiwara no Kiyosuke had composed an earlier treatise, the Ōgishō (奥義抄), a decade prior to Fukuro zōshi; like Fukuro zōshi, it was dedicated to Emperor Nijō.

Historian Terry Kawashima dates Fukuro zōshi to the turbulent late Heian period during which "women, particularly upper-class women, became less visible in the 'public' sphere and suffered from increasingly oppressive conditions because of the consolidation of male privileging ideology, which appeared as a consequence of the establish of the family system (ie) headed by a male". With the establishment of poetic houses like the Rokujō, the poetic practice was becoming professionalized as an occupation passed down a male lineage.

== Content ==
Fukuro zōshi contains a collection of poems, poetic knowledge and trivia, and information about etiquette at poetic events, competitions, and gatherings. The text is written in hentai-kanbun, mixing both Chinese and Japanese elements, rather than Classical Japanese. It includes insights on the origins of the haiku form, as well as a newer form of poetry called renga and specifically kusari renga (鎖連歌, chain linked verse). Kiyosuke singled out the hokku as an art form that demanded special care and attention.

=== Man'yōshū criticism ===
Fukuro zōshi contained important commentary and information about older poetic works such as the Man'yōshū; it was the first (extant) treatises that argues for the imperial status of the Man'yōshū. Kiyosuke reported that his edition contained 4,313 poems (as opposed to the full 4,516 poems) and references various manuscripts of the Man'yōshū that were in circulation. This suggests that the canon of the Man'yōshū had not been determined by the late Heian period that Kiyosuke was writing in and the state of general textual instability of medieval Japan; he also notes that the Kokin Wakashū had 1,090 poems rather than the now accepted 1,111.

Kiyosuke, and other medieval writers, believed that the collection was an imperial, rather than private, collection commissioned by Emperor Shōmu, whereas Fujiwara no Teika argued that it was a private collection.

Kiyosuke recycled some of his earlier works in the Fukuro zōshi; 63 of the 74 Man'yōshū poems from his first poetic handbook, the Waka ichijisho (和歌一字抄), are found in the text. He also included 43 works in the Man'yōshū section that do not appear in any earlier poetic collections, imperial or private, or in any extant works of poetic criticism.

=== Poetic gatherings ===
Imperial poetic gatherings (和歌の会, waka no kai) were courtly poetic events; much of the first book of Fukuro zōshi focuses on proper etiquette for these events, which were a source of aspiration for middle-rank poets such as Kiyosuke, who were not permitted to be in imperial presence. The presentation of the poems in a waka no kai reproduced the court hierarchy based on the order and manner of the poems' presentations.

=== Women poets in the Fukuro zōshi ===
Kiyosuke's work was perhaps the first to define and discuss women are both poets and members of the court; he defined female court poets as the "other" of their male counterparts. Palace women, known as nyōbō (女房), were distinguished from male courtiers and senior nobles who participated in poetry gatherings. However, whereas male courtiers and nobles were described based on their rank, title, and position, court women were simply lumped together as "court women".

=== Zōdan ===
One section of the Fukuro zōshi has the subtitle zōdan (雑談, idle chatter) and contains a miscellaneous selection of anecdotes, lore, and biographic scraps about various poets. This section, as the end of the first book of the text, included extraordinary compositions including those by deities and the dead, with poems by authors such as Ono no Komachi.

=== Poetic competitions ===
Separate from poetic gatherings were poetic competitions. These competitions divided attendees into teams and included rounds of judging of poems.

== Legacy ==
The Fukuro zōshi was the encyclopedia of the Rokujō house's poetic knowledge, and an attempt to consolidate their position within the imperial court system and of the imperial court itself. The text of the Fukuro zōshi was cited by subsequent works, including a treatise by Emperor Juntoku in 1221. Along with Toshiyori zuinō (俊頼髄脳, Toshiyori’s Essentials of Poetry) by Minamoto no Toshiyori, it became one of the two treatises that would dominate the teaching of poetry for the rest of the Japanese medieval period.

Of the 851 poems in the Fukuro zōshi, 179 reappeared in the Nishi Honganji-bon Man’yōshū, the earliest complete manuscript of the Man’yōshū.

=== Editions ===
Two contemporary, fully annotated versions of the Fukuro zōshi have been published since the 1970s, both by Fujioka Tadaharu.
