= Fujiwara no Kanefusa =

Fujiwara no Kanefusa (藤原 兼房; 1153 – March 30, 1217)

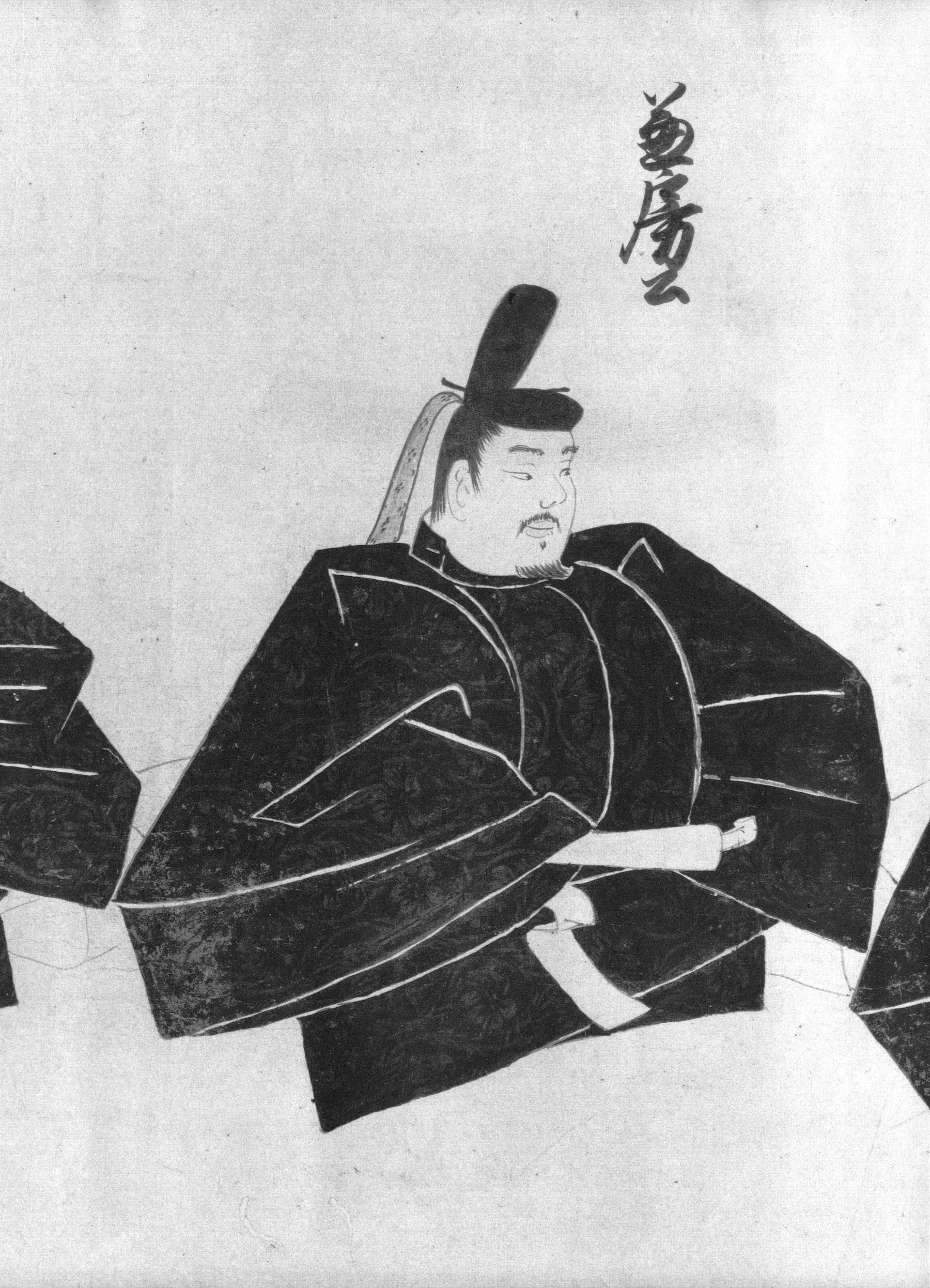
Portrait of Fujiwara no Kanefusa

was the fourth son of the Japanese regent Fujiwara no Tadamichi, and Kaga, daughter of Fujiwara no Nakamitsu. His brothers were Motozane (regent), Motofusa (regent), Kanezane (regent), and Jien. He lacked political capability, but he eventually became Daijō Daijin after his brother Kanezane.

In the Kokon Chomonjū, compiled by Tachibana no Narisue, an episode was recorded about Kanefusa, a great lover of Japanese poetry. Kanefusa wished to know what the great poet Kakinomoto no Hitomaro looked like, and one night Hitomaro appeared to him in a dream. Kanefusa had someone create an image based on the vision from his dream and found that his own poetry improved as a result. The original image was destroyed in a fire but Fujiwara no Akisue received permission to make a copy; the copy was passed down to his descendants, beginning with his son Fujiwara no Akisuke, and became revered as a honzon and proof of headship of the Rokujō School.

== Family ==
Parents

- Father: Fujiwara no Tadamichi (藤原 忠通, March 15, 1097 – March 13, 1164)
- Mother: Kaga no Tsubone (加賀局), daughter of Fujuwara no Kanemitsu (藤原仲光)

Consorts and issue

- Wife: Daughter of Fujiwara no Takasue (藤原隆季)
  - Son: Kujo Kaneyoshi (九条兼良, 1167 – 27 January 1221)
- Wife: Daughter of Fujiwara no Tsunemune (藤原 経宗)
- Unknown
  - Son: Dōyō (道誉)
  - Son: Ken'en (兼円)
  - Son: Dōyū (道祐)
  - Daughter: Lady Hōjō (方丈殿)
