= Shunzei-kyō Waji Sōjō =

Shunzei-kyō Waji Sōjō (俊成卿和字奏状), also known as Shōji Ninen Shunzei-kyō Waji Sōjō (正治二年俊成卿和字奏状), is a Japanese work of poetic criticism (karon) dealing with waka poetry. It was written by the poet and courtier Fujiwara no Shunzei between the seventh and eighth months of the second year of Shōji (1200).

== Title ==
The work of poetic criticism composed by Fujiwara no Shunzei in the late summer of 1200 is formally known as Shōji Ninen Shunzei-kyō Waji Sōjō, literally signifying "a document submitted to the emperor (sōjō) in Japanese characters (waji) by Shunzei in the second year of Shōji". This title is variously abbreviated to Shōji Ninen Sōjō, Shōji Ninen Waji Sōjō, Shōji Sōjō, Shunzei-kyō Waji Sōjō, and so on. The form of the title given precedence herein is that used by Shōichirō Kubota in his article on Shunzei for the Nihon Koten Bungaku Daijiten.

== Authorship and date ==
As is made clear from the title, the work was composed by the courtier, poet and scholar Fujiwara no Shunzei. Shunzei wrote it between the 26th day of the seventh month and the eighth day of the eighth month of Shōji 2 (or, between 6 September and 17 September 1200 according to the Julian calendar).

This date is established from references in the Maigetsushō, the diary kept by Shunzei's son Teika, which recounts that on the 15th day of the seventh month he heard tell from his brother-in-law, Saionji Kintsune, of a poetry competition to be hosted by Retired Emperor Go-Toba. According to the entry for the 18th, Teika was initially meant to be included, but that due to the machinations of Fujiwara no Suetsune only poets of a certain age and over were to be allowed participate. Teika was naturally upset at this. In the Maigetsushō entry for the ninth day of the following month, however, Teika records that the previous night it had been decided that he, along with the poets Fujiwara no Ietaka and Fujiwara no Takafusa, would be allowed participate, recording that this was due to the intervention of his father submitting a plea to retired emperor.

== Contents ==
In the treatise, Shunzei gives examples of similar poetry gatherings in the past where there were no age limitations, and in addition to giving his own views on waka composition he praises the progressive style of waka composition employed by his son. He also criticizes Fujiwara no Kiyosuke and Fujiwara no Norinaga.
