= Fujiwara no Kiyosuke =

Japanese court noble and waka poet

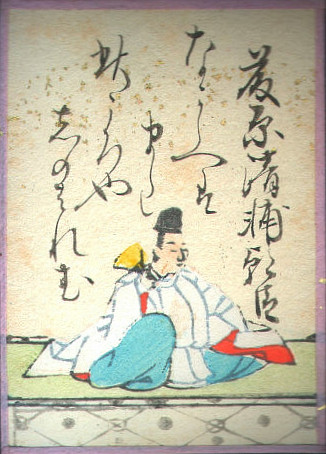
Fujiwara no Kiyosuke, from the Ogura Hyakunin Isshu.

Fujiwara no Kiyosuke (藤原清輔; 1104-1177) was a Japanese waka poet and poetry scholar of the late Heian period.

He was the second son of Akisuke (顕輔), compiler of the Shika Wakashū.

== Poetry ==
The following poem by him was included as No. 84 in Fujiwara no Teika's Ogura Hyakunin Isshu:

Japanese text	Romanized Japanese	English translation
ながらへば またこのごろや しのぼれむ 憂しとみし世ぞ 今は恋しき	Nagaraeba mata kono goro ya shinobaren ushi to mishi yo zo ima wa koishiki	If I live long, I may look back with yearning for these painful days— the world that now seems harsh may then appear sweet and good!

He was a member of the conservative Rokujō school of poetic composition, and Donald Keene has called him a "mediocre poet". Suzuki et al., however, say that his brilliant poetry scholarship put him at the top of the waka world in his day.

He was one of the first to apply rules of choosing themes, participants and judges in the uta-awase poetry gatherings. His standards of judging poetry, made him a rival of Fujiwara no Shunzei.

About 1165, Emperor Nijō commissioned him to compile a waka anthology, which became the Shoku Shika Wakashū (続詞花和歌集; "Continued Shika Wakashū", also called Shoku Shikashū). He compiled twenty books of 998 poems, a much larger anthology than its namesake, and submitted to the emperor expecting for it to be recognized as the seventh imperial anthology. The emperor died before its completion, and it remains consigned to the status of a private collection. Ultimately ninety-four of his poems were included in imperial collections.

== Scholarship ==
Kiyosuke is known primarily as the author of the Fukuro zōshi (袋草紙; compiled before 1159) and the Ōgishō (奥義抄; compiled 1124~1144). He was one of the first scholars to question the traditional 905 date of the Kokin Wakashū.

In the 1170s, Kiyosuke became the poetry tutor of Fujiwara no Kanezane of the Kujō family. He served as a judge for a number of poetry competitions hosted by Kanezane.

== Legacy ==
Kiyosuke's library was known and admired by other poets both in his lifetime and after his death. The poet Fujiwara no Teika of the rival Mikohidari poetic house described him as the "Confucian scholar" (儒士) of waka. According to the 13th century Kokon Chomonjū, Kiyosuke left his waka library to his half brother Fujiwara no Suetsune.

== Bibliography ==
- Keene, Donald (1999). A History of Japanese Literature, Vol. 1: Seeds in the Heart — Japanese Literature from Earliest Times to the Late Sixteenth Century. New York: Columbia University Press. ISBN 978-0-231-11441-7.
- McMillan, Peter (2010). One Hundred Poets, One Poem Each. New York: Columbia University Press. ISBN 978-0-231-14399-8.
- Suzuki, Hideo; Yamaguchi, Shin'ichi; Yoda, Yasushi (2009). Genshoku: Ogura Hyakunin Isshu. Tokyo: Bun'eidō. ISBN 978-4-578-10082-9.
