= Saigyōzakura =

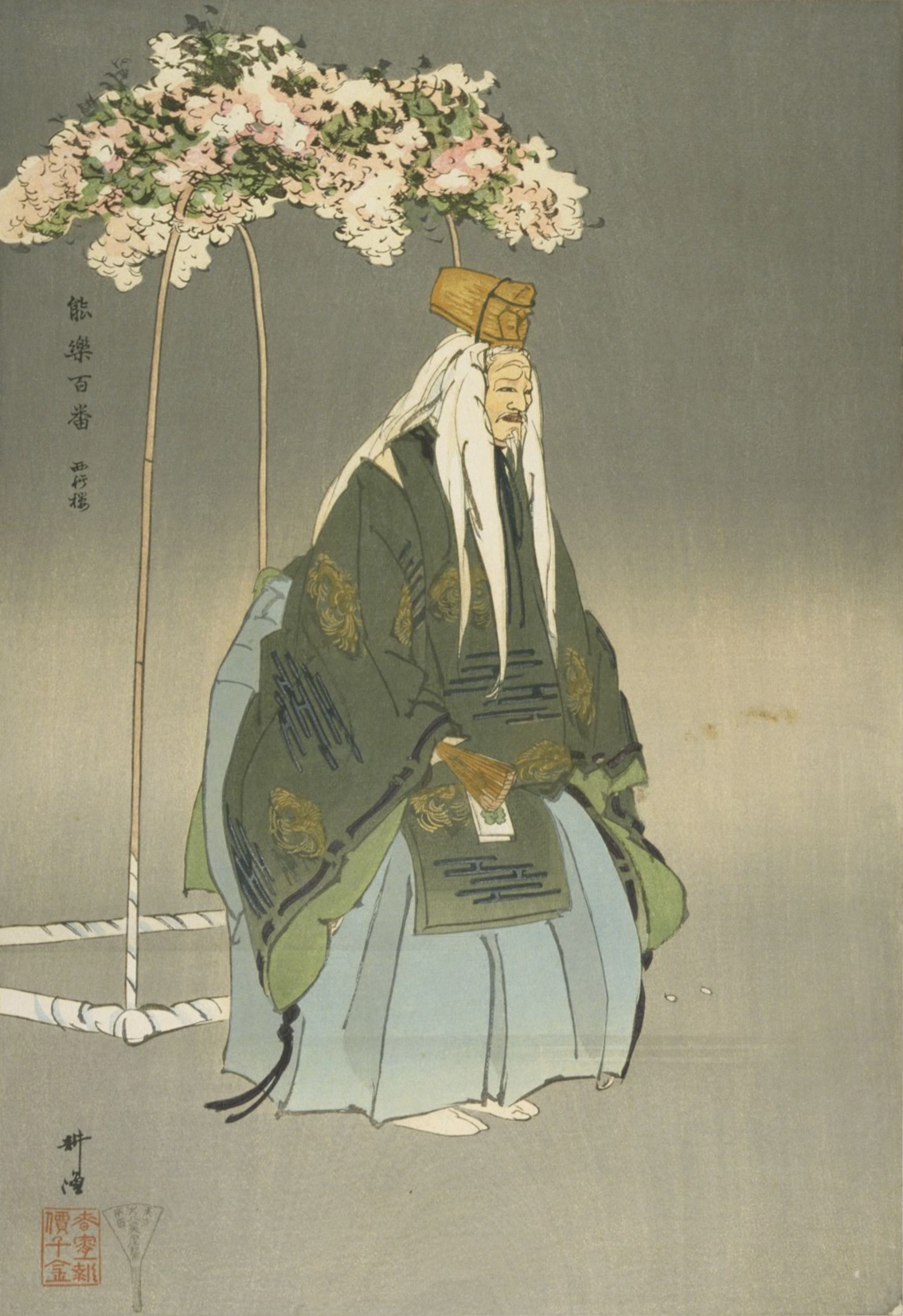
Scene from Saigyōzakura, woodblock print by Tsukioka Kōgyo, from the series Nōgaku hyakuban or One Hundred Noh Plays (National Noh Theatre)

Saigyōzakura (西行桜, Saigyō's cherry tree) is a Noh play by Zeami about the famous poet Saigyō, regarding his well-known love for cherry blossoms.

== Background ==
Saigyō was renowned for his love of the flowering cherry - what he himself once called "my lifelong habit of having my mind immersed in blossoms".

As a recluse however, he sometimes found himself in conflict with the Japanese habit of collective blossom viewing: as he wrote in his Sankashū, "Leave me in solitude/O Cherry flowers./Draw not people,/for they come in crowds".

== Plot ==
Wishing to be alone with his cherry-blossoms, Saigyō is annoyed by the arrival of a party of (potential) viewers; and, on admitting them, composes a waka blaming the cherry tree for their intrusive presence.

That night he is visited by the spirit of the cherry-tree, who rebukes him by pointing out the separateness and independence of all living creatures from human concerns. The two then converse, before the play ends with an extensive dance celebrating cherry flowers, exceptional sakura sites like Kiyomizu-dera, and the transient beauty of Spring.

== See also ==
- Eguchi (play)
- The Priest and the Willow
