= Eguchi (play) =

江口
- English title: Mouth-of-Sound
- Written by: Kan'ami, Zeami
- Revised by: Zeami
- Category: 3rd — katsura mono
- Characters: waki monk wakizure companions maeshite woman nochishite Harlot of Eguchi tsure two singing girls aikyogen villager
- Place: Eguchi, a port near Osaka
- Time: concerns a 12th-century incident
- Sources: Senjūshō (13th century)
- Schools: all

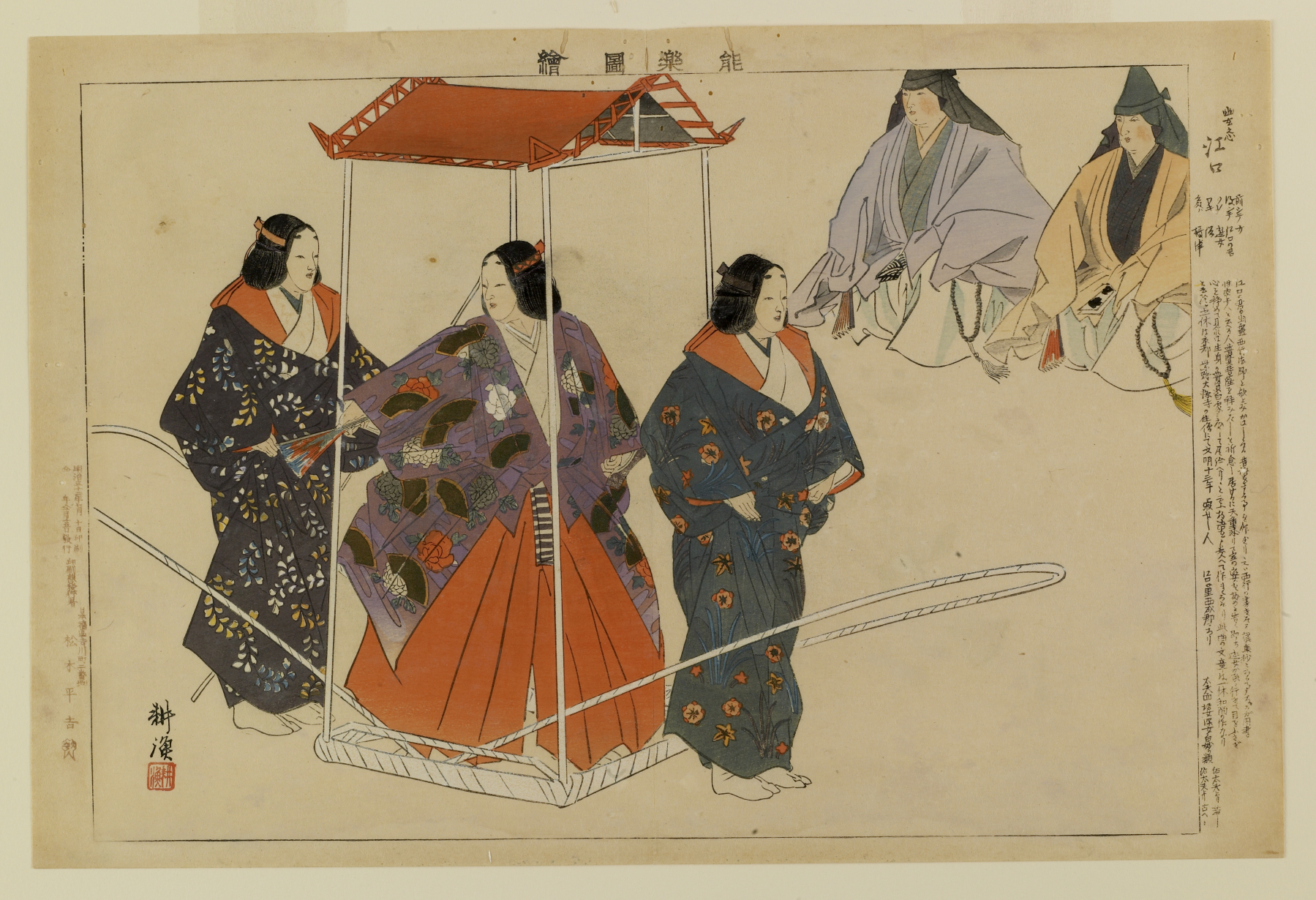
As monks chant by the side of a river, a vision of the famous courtesan Eguchi appears on the water before them. Eguchi and two young women stand in the gorgeous attire of courtesans within a framework barge that represents a floating brothel. It is revealed to the monks, through song and dance that Eguchi is in fact an incarnation of a Buddhist deity, the Bodhisattva Fugen.

Eguchi (江口) is a Noh play of the third category, written by Zeami, around a fragment (the courtesan's sermon) by Kan'ami. The play combines two legends, one related to the holy man Shōkū (concerning the identity of the courtesan of Mura with the bodhisattva Fugen) and the other related to the monk Saigyō: (the admonishment of the courtesan of Eguchi).

== Plot summary ==
A travelling monk arrives by night at the port of Eguchi. Seeing a cairn, he enquires about its origin and is told that it commemorates the Lady of Eguchi, a former courtesan and poet, who was subsequently considered to be a manifestation of a bodhisattva, specifically Fugen Bosatsu, Bodhisattva of Universal Virtue.

During a rainstorm, the 12th-century monk Saigyō had asked for shelter at her house, but was refused entry. He reproached her with an impromptu poem, complaining that "you are stingy/even with the night I ask of you,/a place in your soon-left inn" Her devastating reply hinged on a Buddhist interpretation of the words "a moment's refuge": "It's because I heard/you're no longer bound to life/as a householder/that I'm loath to let you get attached/to this inn of brief, bought stays". She then admitted him, and engaged in a long conversation. In The Unfettered Mind, Zen Buddhist monk Takuan Sōhō cites this encounter to illustrate the importance that the "mind not be detained".

The travelling monk thoughtfully recites Saigyō's poem to himself, and is overheard by a passing woman, who asks him to follow it with the courtesan's reply. She tells the monk not to believe the gossip about her; when she vanishes they realise that she is, in fact, the ghost of the courtesan of Eguchi.

A villager then tells them the story of Shōkū, who longed to worship the living Fugen, and was directed in a dream to seek the Lady of Eguchi.

Fascinated, the monk begins to repeat a sutra by her grave. A boat, brightly moonlit, appears, bearing the Lady along with two singing girls. They sing of the unhappiness of mortals ensnared in illusion and condemned to be reborn. In conclusion, they remind the monk that "all things are a moment's refuge"; the Lady reveals her identity as Fugen, and ascends into the clouds.

== Later references ==
- Basho's haiku on sleeping under the same roof as a pair of concubines is thought to refer back to Saigyō's tanka, and to the play built around it.

== See also ==
- Saigyōzakura
- The Priest and the Willow
- Matsuyama tengu
- Sankashū
