= The Priest and the Willow =

Japanese Noh play

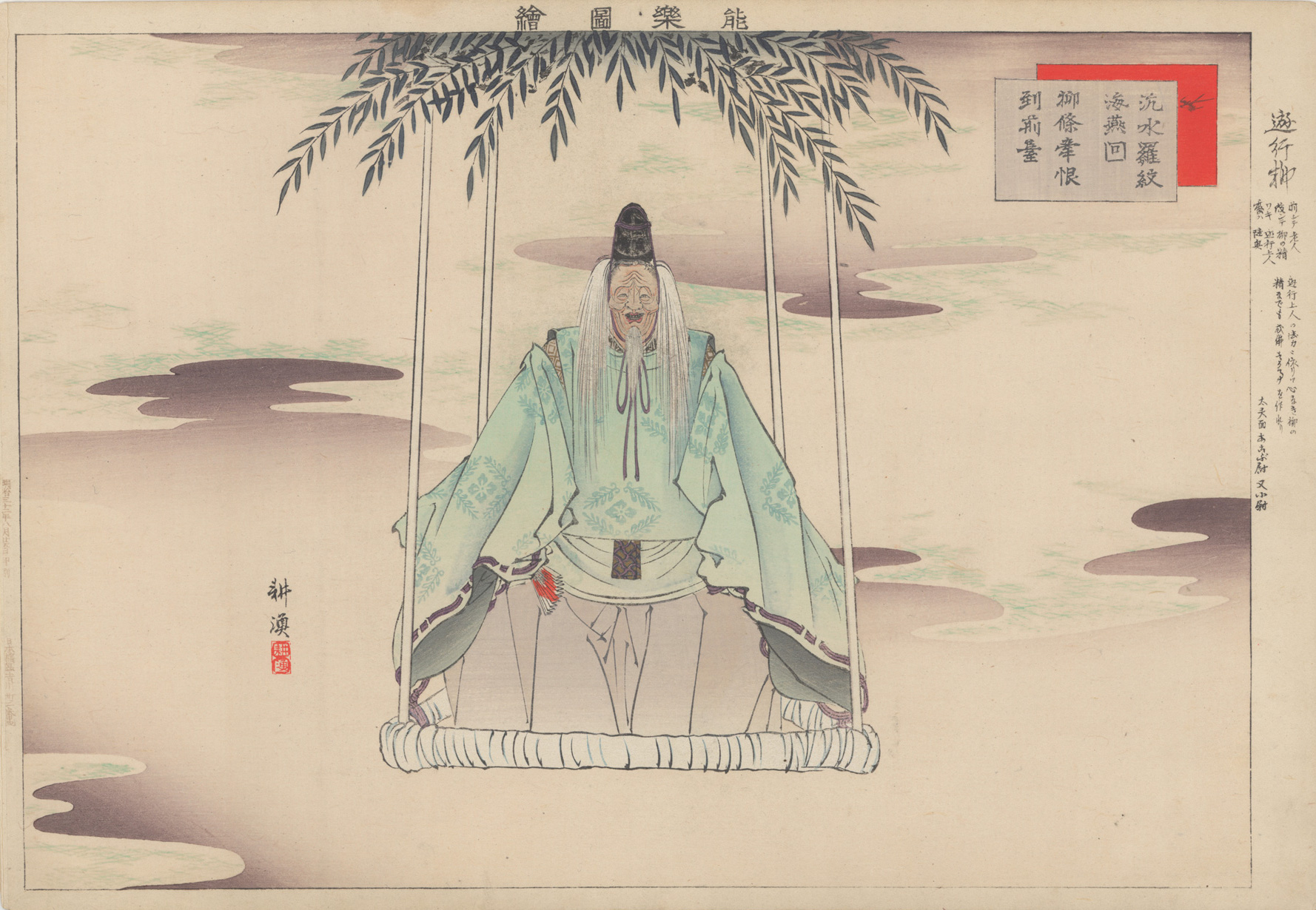
Scene from Yugyō yanagi; woodblock print by Kōgyo Tsukioka from the series Nōgaku zue or Pictures of Noh Plays

The Priest and the Willow (遊行柳, Yugyō yanagi) is a Noh play based on the experiences of the 12th-century poet and travelling-monk Saigyō.

== Original kernel ==
Saigyō was travelling to North Japan, when he sat in the shade of a willow-tree, later identified by Bashō as being close to the village of Ashino, and wrote a waka: " ‘Just a brief stop,’/ I said when stepping off the road/into a willow's shade/where a bubbling stream flows by,/as has time since my ‘brief stop’ began".

== Main theme ==
A wandering priest, Yugyō Shonin, is given directions by an old man who recites Saigyō's poem before vanishing: the priest then realises it was the spirit of the willow tree. By reciting a prayer to Amida Buddha, he enables the spirit to attain Buddhahood, for which the willow spirit thanks him in a dance sequence.

== Later developments ==
Buson wrote a haiku on rocks and willows underneath the Pilgrim's Willow Tree, alluding to the Noh play.

== See also ==
- Eguchi (play)
- Matsuyama tengu
- Saigyōzakura
- Sankashū
