= Buddhist poetry =

Genre of literature

Buddhist poetry is a genre of literature that forms a part of Buddhist discourse.

== Origins ==
The first examples of Buddhist poetry can be found in traditional scriptures such as the Dhammapada, according to which, Siddhārtha Gautama (the founder of Buddhism), upon his reaching enlightenment, proclaimed:

Anekajātisaṁsāraṁ,
sandhāvissaṁ anibbisaṁ;

Gahakāraṁ gavesanto,
dukkhā jāti punappunaṁ.

Gahakāraka diṭṭhosi,
puna gehaṁ na kāhasi;
Sabbā te phāsukā bhaggā,
gahakūṭaṁ visaṅkhataṁ;
Visaṅkhāragataṁ cittaṁ,
taṇhānaṁ khayamajjhagā.

Translation:

Through the round of many births I roamed
without reward,
without rest,
seeking the house-builder.
Painful is birth
again & again.

House-builder, you're seen!
You will not build a house again.
All your rafters broken,
the ridge pole destroyed,
gone to the Unformed, the mind
has come to the end of craving.

== Form ==
Traditionally, most Buddhist sutras have a prose component supplemented by verses (known as gatha) that reiterate and poetically summarize the themes of preceding prose passages. Gatha functions as a mnemonic device helping the Buddhist practitioner commit to memory a certain doctrinal maxim. And in fact, the earliest extant forms of Buddhist discourse appear in verse, which is hardly surprising, considering that the texts were not originally written, but memorized. Linguistic analysis shows that the prose component of the sutras is likely to have been modified by later editing, while the poems often contain earlier forms of language. This view is confirmed by Japanese Buddhist scholar Hajime Nakamura, who states that the verse components of the Pali Canon actually predate the prose components, the former being a way of facilitating memorization, as the Pali Canon was transmitted orally for the first 300 or so years.

Current Buddhology generally maintains that even the liturgical scriptures are products of literary composition. Hence, the study of Buddhist text in general and Buddhist poetry in particular cannot be disengaged from the literary field. But for the sake of classification it is useful to distinguish between

1. Buddhist poetry that is attributed to the Buddha himself, which forms a part of "Buddha Speech" (Sk. Buddhavacana), and
2. Buddhist poetry written by Buddhists, which is not included in the sutras.

== Buddhist poetry in Pali ==
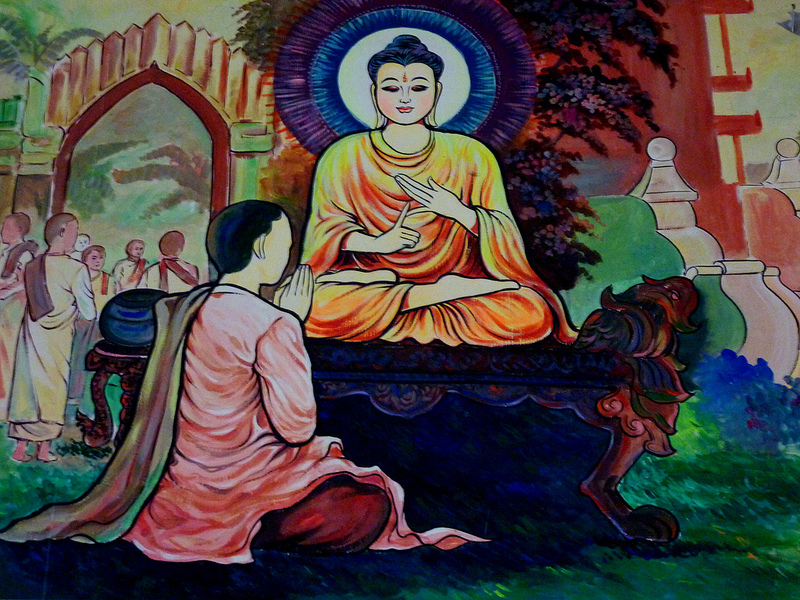
Mahapajapati, first Buddhist nun and Buddha's stepmother ordains. One of the first Buddhist poets and also one of the first of women in the Indian subcontinent to write poems.

The early Buddhist sources mention a Buddhist monk called Vaṅgīsa, who was considered by the Buddha as the foremost of his disciples with respect to spontaneity of speech because he could recite poetry by composing it on the spot. He is considered to have been the author of the final and longest section of the Theragatha, the Mahanipata or "Great Section."

The Therīgāthā, often translated as Verses of the Elder Nuns (Pāli: therī elder (feminine) + gāthā verses), is a Buddhist text, a collection of short poems of early women who were elder nuns (having experienced 10 Vassa or monsoon periods). It is the earliest known collection of women's literature composed in India. The poems date from a three hundred year period, with some dated as early as the late 6th century BCE. In the Pāli Canon, the Therigatha is classified as part of the Khuddaka Nikaya, the collection of short books in the Sutta Pitaka. It consists of 73 poems organized into 16 chapters. It is the companion text to the Theragatha.

The Therigatha is a very significant document in the study of early Buddhism as well as the earliest-known collection of women's literature. The Therigatha contains a passages reaffirming the view that women are the equal of men in terms of spiritual attainment as well as verses that address issues of particular interest to women in ancient South Asian society. Included in the Therigatha are the verses of a mother whose child has died (Thig VI.1 and VI.2), a former sex worker who became a nun (Thig V.2), a wealthy heiress who abandoned her life of pleasure (Thig VI.5) and even verses by the Buddha's own aunt and stepmother, Mahapajapati Gotami (Thig VI.6).

An additional collection of scriptures concerning the role and abilities of women in the early Sangha is found in the fifth division of the Samyutta Nikaya, known as the Bhikkhunī-Saṃyutta "Nun's discourse".

A number of the nuns whose verses are found in the Therigatha also have verses in the book of the Khuddaka Nikaya known as the Apadāna, often called the Biographical Stories in English. The majority of these have been translated into the English language.

== Buddhist poetry in Sanskrit ==
A significant number of Buddhist poets composed their works in Sanskrit.

=== Aśvaghoṣa ===
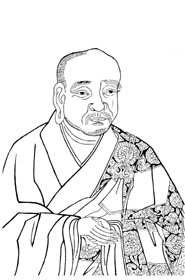
Aśvaghoṣa, one of the great Buddhist Sanskrit poets

One of the first and best known is Aśvaghoṣa, of whom two complete "Great Poems" (mahākāvya) survive, i.e. the "Acts of the Buddha" (Buddhacarita.) and "Handsome Nanda" (Saundarananda). The first tells the life-story of Śākyamuni Buddha, while the second tells the story of Nanda, the Buddha's handsome cousin, who was guided towards liberation by turning his greatest weakness – desire – into a motivating factor for practice. Fragments of a drama called Śāriputraprakaraṇa are also extant, and these may be some of the oldest, perhaps even the oldest example of Sanskrit drama. Aśvaghoṣa's verses are often simple yet very suggestive, casting key Buddhist teachings, such as impermanence, in evocatively paced similes:

vihagānāṁ yathā sāyaṁ
tatra tatra samāgamaḥ
jātau jātau tathāśleṣo
janasya svajanasya ca

Translation:

Like birds in the evening
May meet here or there,
So too from birth to birth
One embraces one's kin.

Other verses of Aśvaghoṣa capture in vivid images human indecision, uncertainty and sorrow. The following verse describes Nanda at the door of his house, torn between the wish to remain with his beloved wife and the sense of respect that prompts him to leave and meet the Buddha to make amends for neglecting the Buddha's alms-round in front of his house:

taṅ gauravaṃ buddhagataṃ cakarṣa
bhāryānurāgaḥ punar ācakarṣa
sa 'niścayān nāpi yayau na tasthau
turaṃs taraṅgeṣv iva rājahaṃsaḥ

Translation:

Respect for the Buddha pulled him away
love for his wife pulled him back;
undecided, neither he went nor he stayed
like a swan-king pressed between waves.

=== Mixed Genre ===
Sanskrit poetry is subdivided into three types: verse works (padya) prose works (gadya) and mixed works (campū); nowhere in the Indic tradition is versification taken as the distinguishing feature of literary diction, as all sorts of works, whether philosophical, medical, etc., were composed in verse, for ease of memorization. Several Buddhist authors specialized in mixed verse-prose compositions, often re-telling traditional stories about the Buddha's previous births (jātaka). Among the authors writing on the basis of the Jātakas, most prominent is perhaps Āryaśūra; other beautiful collections of literary Jātakas are those of Haribhaṭṭa and Gopadatta. Haribhaṭṭa's collection includes a concise version of the life story of Śākyamuni Buddha; he describes Māra's dejection after understanding the Buddha's victory and superiority in the following verse:

evam ukte 'tha śākyendre
'dhomukhaḥ kusumāyudhaḥ
hato 'ham iti kāṣṭhena
viṣasāda mahīṃ likhan

Translation:

After the Lord of the Śākyas had said this,
the Flower-Arrows god, face downcast,
thinking "I am undone", sank down,
writing on the earth with a stick.

This is reminiscent of a famous verse from Kālidāsa's Kumārasaṁbhava, and the (probably intended) contrast between the two verses is itself suggestive.

evaṃ vādini devarṣau pārśve pitur adhomukhī
līlākamalapatrāṇi gaṇayām āsa pārvatī

Translation:

While the divine Sage was thus speaking,
at the side of her father, face downcast,
Pārvatī counted the lotus petals of her play.

Kālidāsa celebrates the budding presence of the God of Love in Pārvatī's mind, as she is thrilled to hear a discussion about her future husband; Haribhaṭṭa describes the Love God's defeat at the time of the Buddha's Awakening. Pārvatī is holding lotus-petals; Māra is holding a wooden stick.

Another important type of mixed verse/prose works is Sanskrit drama (nāṭaka), and here king Harṣadeva deserves special mention. The patron of the great Chinese monk Xuanzang composed the Nāgānanda, an outstanding drama based on the traditional story of Jīmūtavāhana, prince of the Vidyādharas. While perfectly at ease within the conventions of court poetry, including the depiction of love and attraction, Harṣadeva's Nāgānanda is suffused with Buddhist reflections on compassion and on the futility of hatred, and on impermanence and the inevitability of death. The following words are spoken by a brave Nāga boy to his mother, who is suffering from extreme sorrow as her child will soon be sacrificed to the voracious bird Garuḍa:

kroḍīkaroti prathamaṃ
yadā jātam anityatā
dhātrīva jananī paścāt
tadā śokasya kaḥ kramaḥ

Translation:

Impermanence embraces the new-born,
like a midwife, first,
and the mother, afterwards:
what proper place is there for sorrow?

=== Subhāṣita (Good Sayings) ===
Another genre where Buddhist poets excelled is the "good-sayings" (subhāṣita), collections of proverb-like verses often dealing with universally applicable principles not so specific to the Buddhist tradition. One such collection of verses is attributed to the Buddha himself, and preserved in different versions as the Udānavarga (Sanskrit), Dhammapada (Pāli), Dharmapada (Prākr̥t and Gāndhārī). This collection often uses similes (upamā) to exemplify key Buddhist teachings:

nāsti kāmasamo hy ogho
nāsti doṣasamo grahaḥ
nāsti mohasamaṁ jālaṁ
nāsti tṛṣṇāsamā nadī

Translation:

There is no flood like desire,
There is no possession like hatred,
There is no net like delusion,
There is no river like craving.

Other significant collections are Ravigupta's Āryakośa, Vararuci's Gāthāśataka, Ratnamati's Prakaraṇa, and several others. One of the largest anthologies of good sayings extant in Sanskrit is by a Buddhist abbot, i.e. Vidyākara's Subhāṣitaratnakośa. The Subhāṣita genre became also well-established in Tibet, one of the greatest examples being Sakya Paṇḍita, an early and influential master of the Sakyapa school, known to have been fluent in Sanskrit from an early age.

=== Guides to Spiritual Practice ===
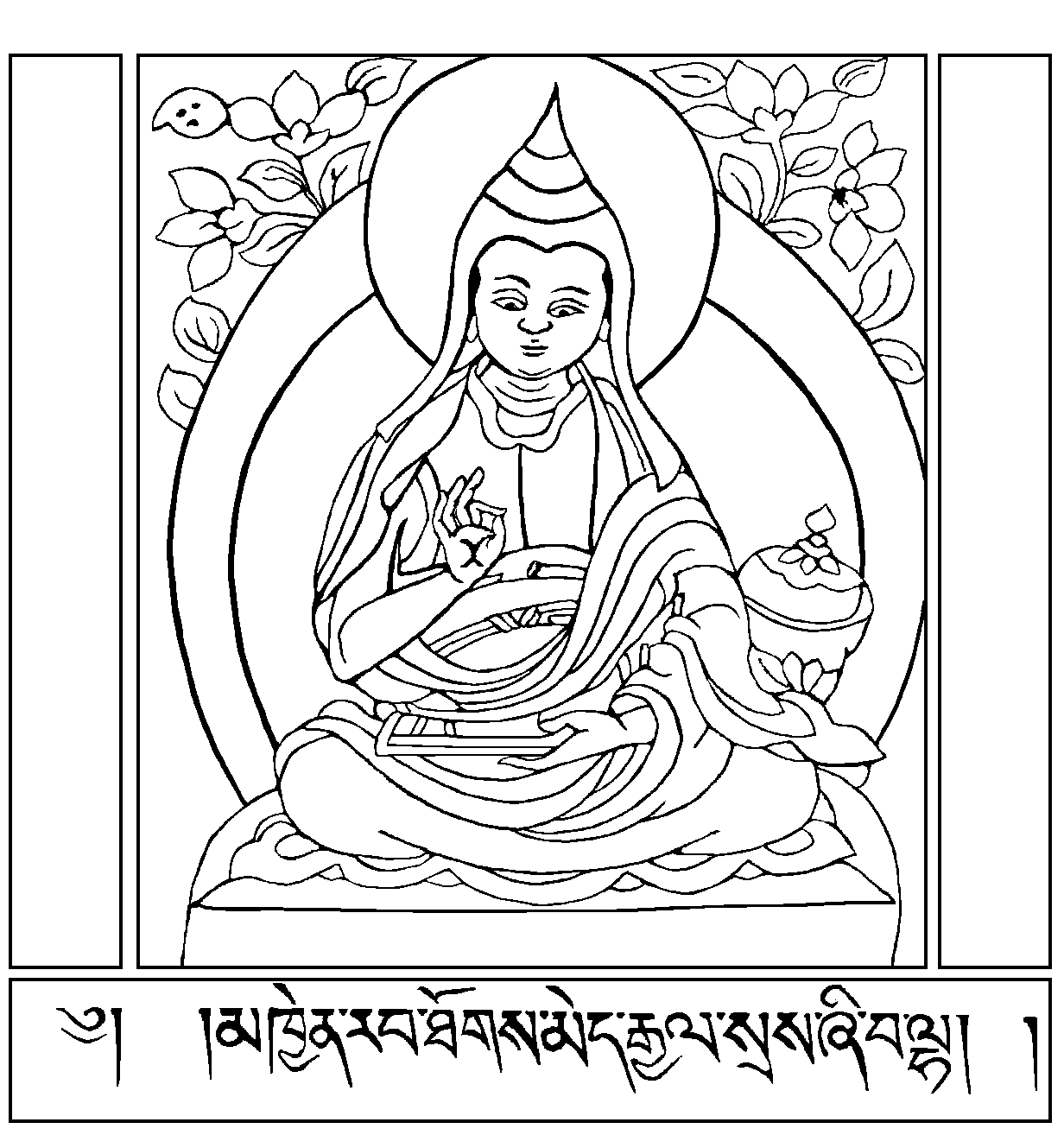
Śāntideva

Ārya Śāntideva's "Entrance into the practice of the Bodhisattvas" (Bodhicaryāvatāra) partly resembles a collection of good sayings, yet in many ways defies classification. It is written in a number of rather different literary registers, resembling court poetry in places, while being very dramatic in others; some verses are indeed "good-sayings", in both content and style, while an entire chapter is written in the confident and terse tone of a Madhyamaka philosophical text, with the usual alternation of objections and rebuttals. The work is a compendium of Mahāyāna practice, covering the six perfections (pāramitā) which may be said to function as its main structural guideline. The "Compendium of Perfections" by Āryaśūra is another such guide, containing numerous excellent verses and organized even more systematically in terms of the six perfections.

Other guides to Buddhist practices were written in the form of versified letters; among these, the "Letter to a Friend" (Suhr̥llekhā) and the "Garland of Gems" (Ratnāvalī) of Nāgārjuna deserve special mention, not just for their content and style, but also for being very influential in India and Tibet; another remarkable epistle extant in Sanskrit is Candragomin's "Letter to a disciple" (śiṣyalekhā), also outlining the Buddhist path for a disciple. These letters exemplify the friendly and respectful relationship between Buddhist masters and their patrons, who received advice on a number of different topics, both worldly and supramundane.

=== Hymns of Praise ===
Buddhist poets wrote very many praises of the Buddha, Dharma and Saṅgha, and of Bodhisattvas and meditational deities. The One Hundred and Fifty Verses of Mātr̥ceṭa seem to have been particularly popular; Nandipriya's extensive commentary on this work still survives in the Tibetan Tangyur (Śatapañcaśatkanāmastotraṭīkā, Brgya lṅa bcu pa źes bya ba'i bstod pa'i 'grel pa, Tg bstod tshogs ka 116a5-178a1.). Mātr̥ceṭa's verses use accessible language, with strong echoes from different types of Buddhist literature, and transmit a sense of great devotion all the more highlighted by the poet's restrained and measured diction:

samyaksaṃbodhibījasya
cittaratnasya tasya te
tvam eva vīra sārajño
dūre tasyetaro janaḥ

Translation:

Seed of perfect awakening,
gem of your mind:
you, hero, know its essence,
others – are far.

Buddhist praises often have didactic purposes; some of them (like Nāgārjuna's Catuḥstava) expound philosophical ideas of specific schools, while praises of Bodhisattvas and meditational deities often facilitate readers/listeners in acquiring familiarity with important features that become the focus of recollection and or formal meditative contemplation.

Buddhist authors also wrote on prosody (chandas), offering their own poetic examples for different types of Sanskrit meter. Two notable works on Sanskrit poetry are the Chandoratnākara of Ratnākaraśānti and the Vr̥ttamālāstuti of Jñānaśrīmitra, by two great contemporary Vikramaśīla masters who were active on several intellectual fronts and well-known exponents of Yogācāra thought. The Vr̥ttamālāstuti is particularly striking: it consists in verses of praise of the Bodhisattva of Wisdom, Mañjuśrī, which at the same time offer information about the verse that is being exemplified, such as its name and the position of the caesura (yati). A simple example, for the śaraṇa meter:

prasīda bhagavan
vilokaya manāk
jaḍaṁ janam imam
tvadekaśaraṇam

Translation:

Be well-disposed, Bhagavat!
Look a bit at this dull person,
whose only refuge is you.

Pāli poetry follows very similar patters as Sanskrit poetry, in terms of prosody, vocabulary, genres, and poetic conventions; indeed several Pāli authors were well conversant with Sanskrit and even composed works in that language (such as, for example, the Anuruddhaśataka). Sanskrit meters and poetic conventions were more broadly very influential throughout South-East Asia even in respect to vernacular languages (Thai, Burmese, etc.), also thanks to the popularity of literary aesthetic ideas from the tradition of Alaṁkāraśāstra ("The science of ornaments") regarding the purposes and nature of literature.

While discussing praises, literary praises of meditational deities have been briefly mentioned; this brings us into the fold of Buddhist Tantric poetry, which is esoteric in character and thus often laden with evocative symbols meant to be understood only thanks to one's relationship with a living master. Notable are the "Songs of Practice" (Caryāgīti), written in Apabhraṁśa rather than Sanskrit, and including among their authors the "Great Accomplished Ones" (mahāsiddha), such as Saraha, Śāntipā, and many others.

== Buddhist poetry in Asia ==
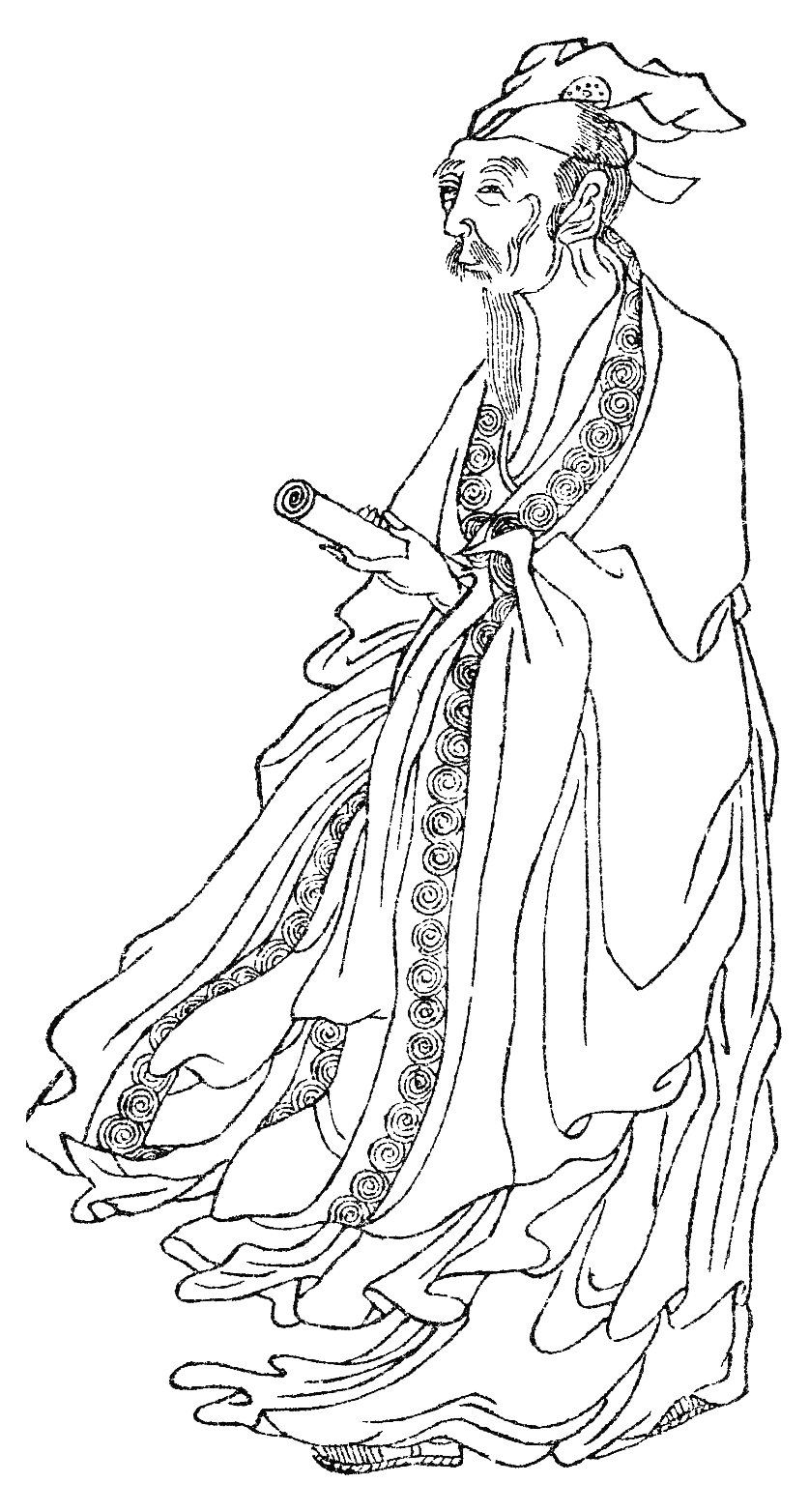
Bai Juyi

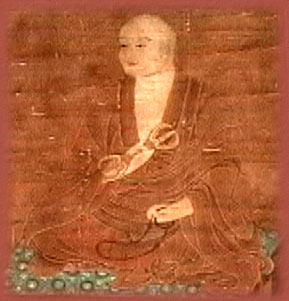
Kūkai (774-835), the founder of the Japanese Shingon and compiler of the famous literary treatise Bunkyō hifuron 文鏡秘府論.

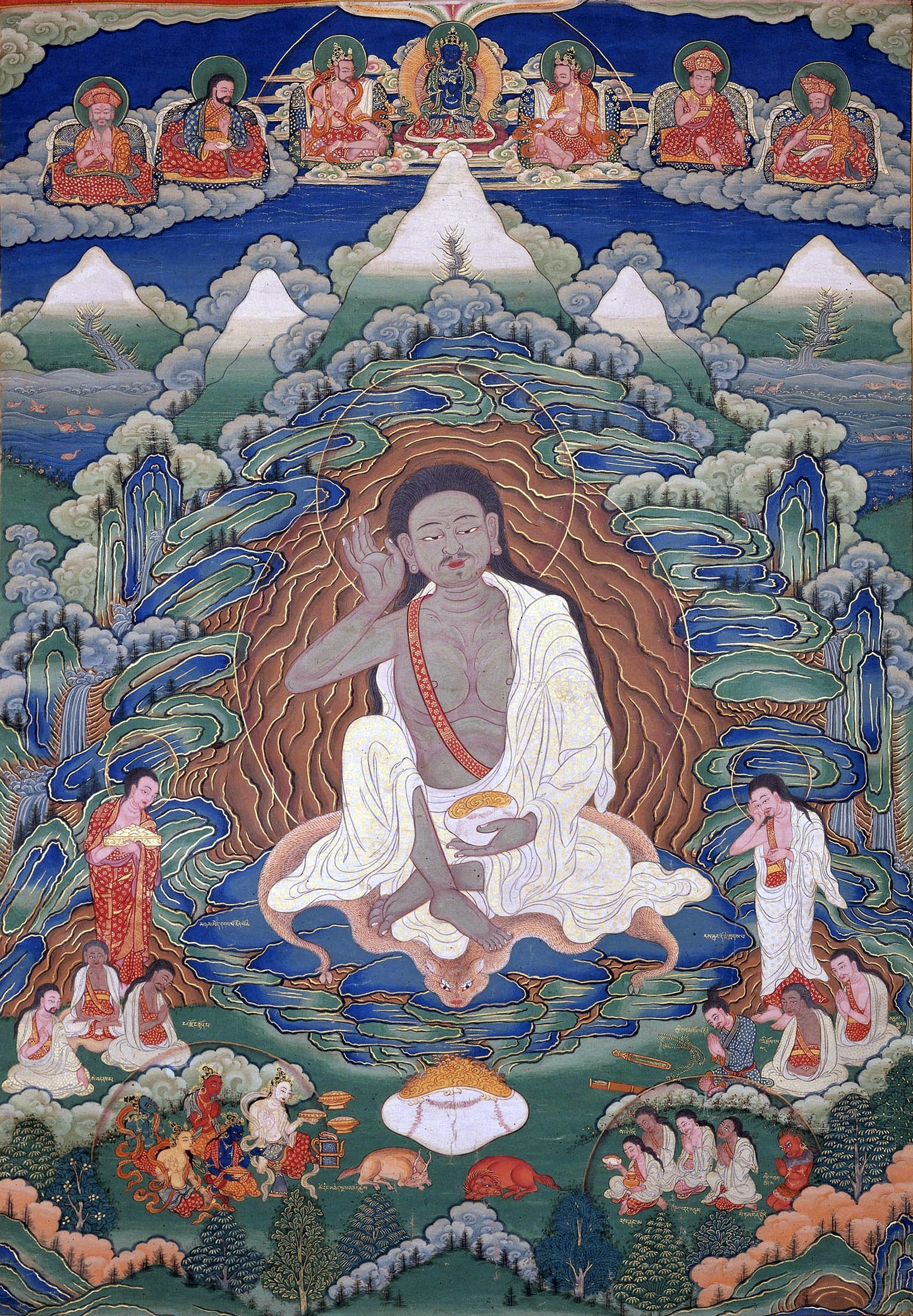
A thangka of Milarepa (1052–1135), a great yogi and poet of Tibet. His poetry is quite probably inspired by Indian Tantric Buddhist poetry, such as dohas by Mahasiddha Saraha, to mention one among many other examples.

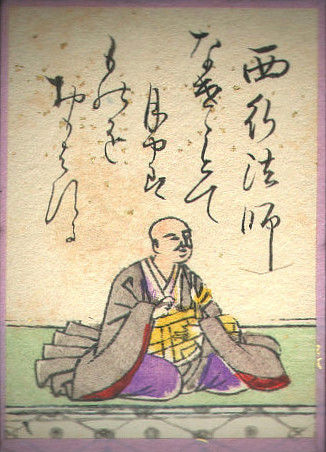
Saigyō in the Hyakunin Isshu.

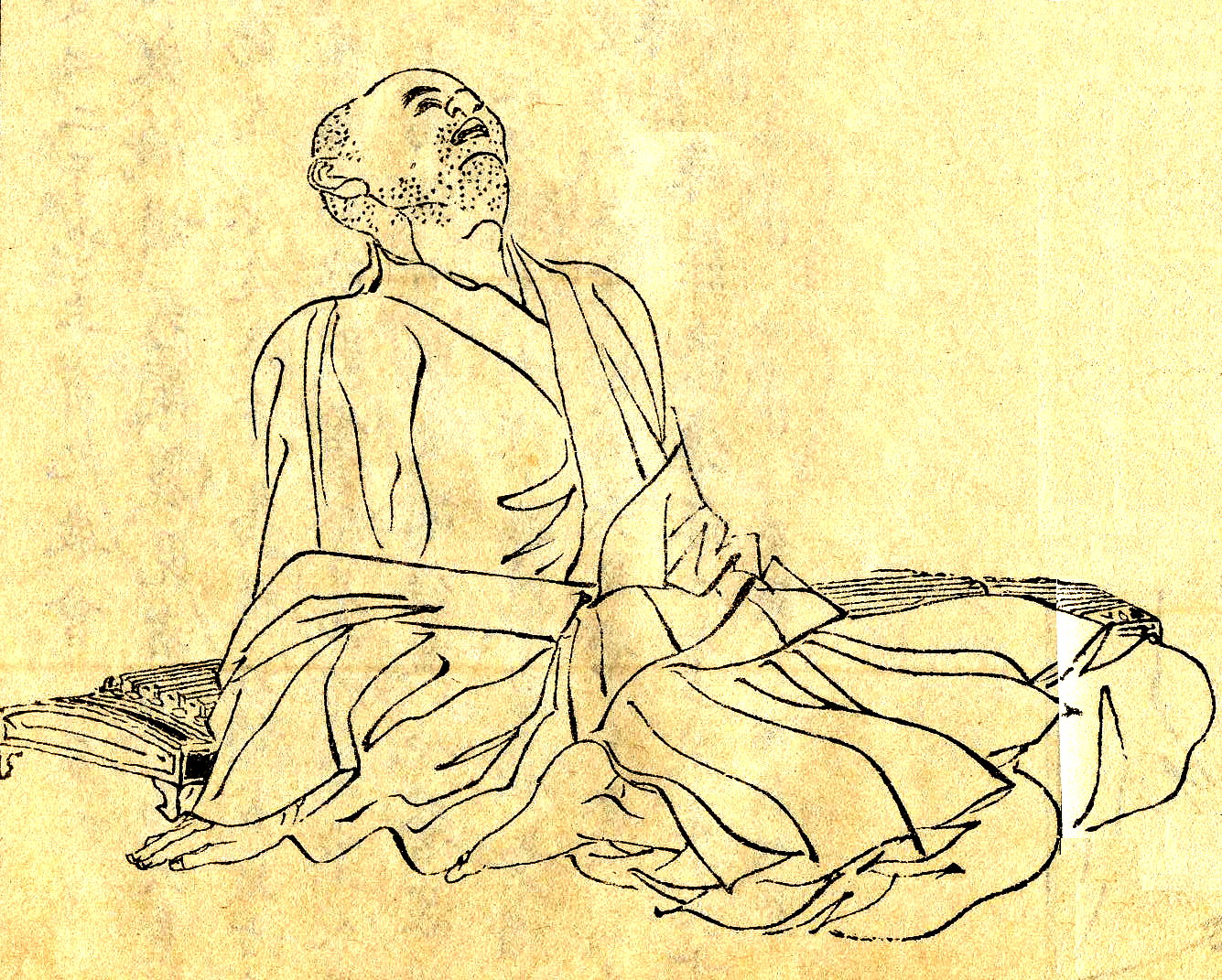
Kamo no Chōmei, by Kikuchi Yosai

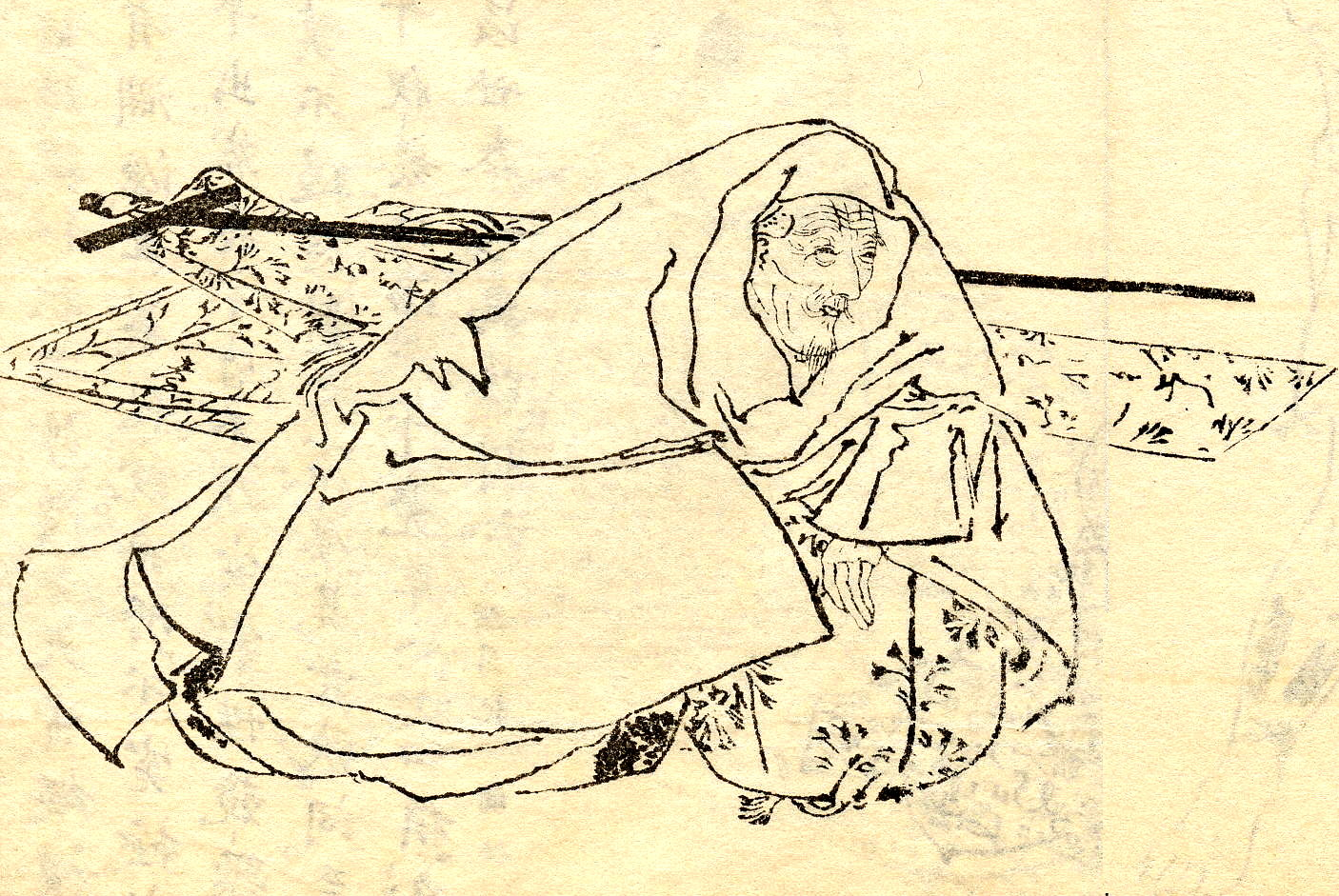
Shunzei in his later days.

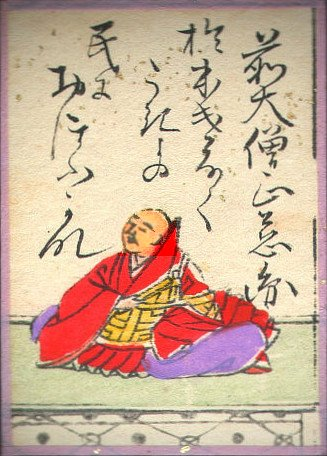
Jien, a famous Japanese Buddhist poet. The translation of this poem is offered here to the left.

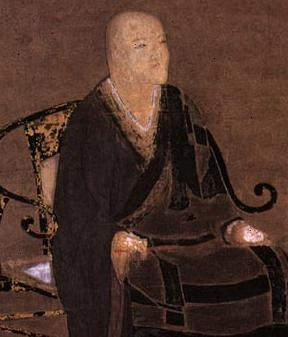
Dōgen, the founder of the Japanese Sōtō Zen school and a celebrated poet.

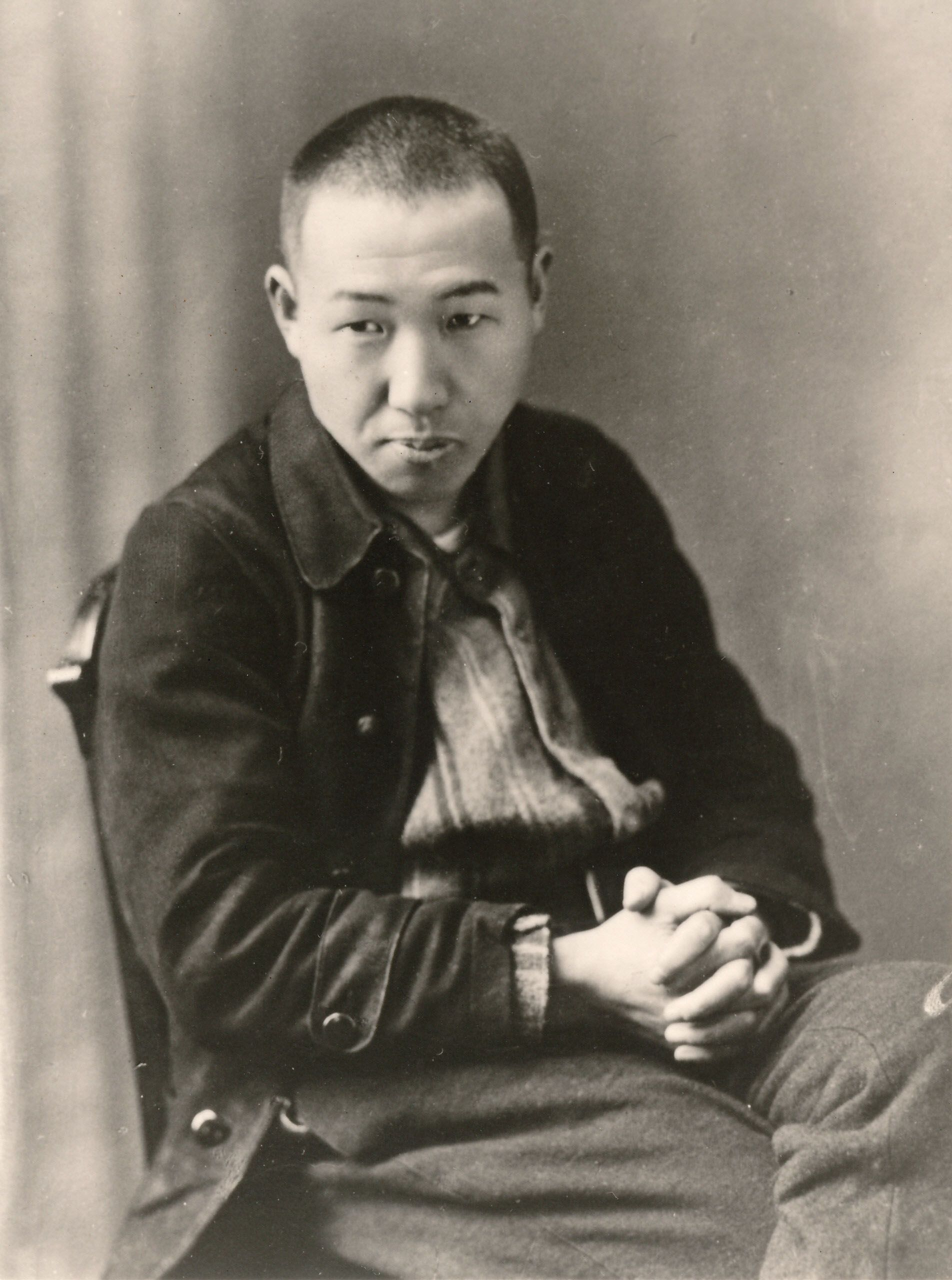
Miyazawa Kenji (1896–1933), a modern Japanese Buddhist poet.

Buddhist poetry – like the bulk of the scriptures produced by Buddhists – is not limited to compositions in Pali and Sanskrit; it has flourished in practically every language that Buddhists speak.

- Notable examples in the Tibetan tradition are works of Milarepa.
- Chinese Buddhist Tradition is particularly rich in poetic expression. In the poetry of Bai Juyi, for instance, we see a tension between the secular and Buddhist poetic expression: many Buddhists considered poetry as an attachment and advocated against it, despite the fact that the scriptures revered by them were abundant in poetic forms. Bai is credited with the coinage of the expression kyōgen kigo (狂言綺語, lit. "deranged words and embellished language"), which, to his view, referred to futility of poetic expression in comparison to Buddhist practice. Perhaps, the most successful Chinese Buddhist poet to resolve this paradox was Jiao Ran 皎然 (730–799), who proposed treatment of poetry as an intellectual instrument of Buddhist practice. Chan Buddhism (Ch. Chan; Jap. Zen) provided a rich ground for Buddhist poetry. Chan Buddhists created a complex language in which indirection, suggestion, ambiguity, paradox, and metaphor are prized over straightforward explanation. This complex language of Chan literature is also applied in Chan poetry. Chan Buddhists asserted that though enlightenment cannot be explained in ordinary terms, poetry, as a special language, can point the way. As the Chan monk Juefan Huihong (1071–1128) wrote, "The subtleties of the mind cannot be transmitted in words, but can be seen in words." In Chan poetry, images as simple as the moon, clouds, boats, reflections in water, plum and lotus, bamboo and pine took on complex connotations based in Chan ideas, famous verbal exchanges, and Chan and Buddhist texts.

To exemplify the use of specialized Buddhist metaphor, this well-known poem by Hanshan (Tang Dynasty) will suffice:

我心如秋月
寒潭清皎洁
无物堪比拟
教我如何言

Translation:

My mind is like the autumn moon,
As fresh and pure as a jade pond.
But nothing really compares with it –
Tell me, how can I explain?

- Korean poets wrote mostly in Classical Chinese.
- Japanese poets also contributed to Buddhist poetic tradition in classical Chinese (e.g. the poetic genius of Kūkai inspired many poets of later generations.) Kūkai, in turn was influenced by Jiao Ran's Shi shi 詩式, as the latter is included in Kūkai's magnum opus of poetics, the Bunkyō hifuron 文鏡秘府論.

In medieval Japan, Buddhist poetry was accorded a special status of a separate genre within the corpus of the waka collections.

== Japanese Buddhist Poetry ==
1. The earliest extant collection of the Japanese poetry, the Man'yōshū, contains a preface (Jp. jo 序 or daishi 題詞) to two poems on the love of parents towards their children: "Sakyamuni expounds truthfully from his golden mouth, 'I love all things equally, the way I love my child, Rahula.' He also teaches that 'no love is greater than the love for ones child.' Even the greatest of saints cherishes his child. Who, then, among the living creatures of this world could fail to love children claimed as one's own?" There are several prefaces and poems in the Man'yōshū that mention the name of Buddha Śākyamuni (Jp. Shaka Nyorai 釋迦如来 /an honorific title of Siddhārtha Gautama), Buddhist temples (Jp. tera 寺), monks and nuns.

2. Among the treasures of Yakushi-ji Temple in Nara there are stone blocks dating from the Nara period modeled as "the footsteps" of the Buddha (Jp. Bussokuseki 佛足石). These blocks contain poems in man'yōgana that may be considered the oldest Buddhist waka (Japanese language poems) known to date. These poems are usually referred to as bussokusekika (lit. "poems on stone imprints of Buddha's feet": 仏足石歌). Consider the following example:

misoji amari
futatsu no katachi
yasogusa to
sodareru hito no
fumishi atodokoro
mare ni mo aru ka mo

Translation:

Rare indeed
are the footprints
where trod the man
who lacked none
of the thirty two marks
and the eighty signs [of Buddhahood].

Both examples above have one trait in common. Namely, the focus on the physical characteristics of the Buddha is prominent: "the golden mouth" of the Buddha in the Man'yoshu and the "feet of the Buddha" in the stone inscriptions relate to the marks of perfection of the Buddha's body / speech (Skt. mahāpuruṣa, lit. [signs of] "a great person").

In the Heian period, Buddhist poetry began to be anthologized in the Imperial Anthologies (Jp. chokusenshū 勅選集. Among the 21 Imperial Anthologies, 19 contain Buddhist tanka (lit. short waka) starting with the Shūi Wakashū, compiled between 1005 and 1007 C.E.

The first Imperial Anthology to treat Buddhist tanka as a separate genre, i.e. shakkyōka (lit. "Poems of Śākyamuni's Teaching": 釈教歌), is the Senzai Wakashū, which has an exclusive section dedicated to the Buddhist Poems in Volume 19 (第十九巻). Among the most famous poets who wrote shakkyōka are: Saigyō; Jakuren; Kamo no Chōmei; Fujiwara no Shunzei; Jien; Nōin; Dōgen, Ton'a, etc. Many of the so-called "Thirty-six Poetry Immortals" wrote Buddhist poetry.

Shakkyōka can be subdivided according to the ten following motifs:

1. Buddhas and bodhisattvas;
2. Eminent monks / nuns;
3. A passage from a sutra;
4. A passage from commentatorial corpus of the Buddhist canon;
5. Buddhist Experience (meditative / devotional states);
6. Mental states, such as delusion, passion, anger, etc. that are important in the Buddhist discourse;
7. Religious deeds;
8. Related to temples and shrines;
9. Buddhist views of Nature;
10. Natural phenomena alluding to Buddhist themes (e.g. transience of flowers blooming)

These motifs are not mutually exclusive and are very often combined within a given poem.

One of the most famous collections of Japanese tanka of the Kamakura period, the Hyakunin Isshu contains several shakkyōka, for instance Poem 95, by Jien (also anthologized in the Senzai Wakashū: 巻十七, 雑中, No. 1137):

おほけなく
うき世の民に
おほふかな
わがたつそまに
墨染の袖

Translation:

Unworthy though I am,
I cast my black robe of a monk
Upon this suffering world,
Living here
On the Mount of Timber.

In later periods, as tanka was slowly being overshadowed by renga and haiku – the two poetic forms that derived from tanka – such famous poets as "the seven worthies of renga", (Jp. renga shichiken 連歌七賢) of the Muromachi period, Sōgi, and still later, Matsuo Bashō, Kobayashi Issa, among many others, carried on the tradition of Buddhist poetry with their compositions.

菊の香や
奈良には古き
仏達
—Bashō

Kiku no ka ya
Nara ni wa furuki
Hotoketachi

In the city of Nara
Fragrance of chrysanthemums;
Buddhas of yore.

The nostalgic feeling of the ancient capital, Nara – interspersed with the scent of chrysanthemums (symbol of Japanese monarchy) and the old Buddha statues – captures well the aesthetic ideals of sabi and yūgen in this famous haiku. Although these three lines appear to be a mere utterance of almost prosaic quality, the imagery invoked is far from simplistic. Buddhas, emperors, passage of time, the ethereal beauty of flowers that presents itself obliquely, i.e., appealing to scent rather than sight – all suggest that the poet sought to use language as a medium of condensed imagery to map an immediate experience, whose richness can only be read in the blanks.

露の世は露の世ながらさりながら
tsuyu no yo wa tsuyu no yo nagara sari nagara

This world of dew
is just a world of dew,
and yet...

Issa

Here the poet uses the image of evanescence of our world, the dewdrop – one of the classical allegories of the Buddhist teaching – to express grief caused by the death of his daughter. In theory, Buddhism teaches its followers to regard all the vicissitudes of life as transitory and ephemeral, akin to magic apparitions without substance or dewdrops soon to evaporate under the sun. Yet, a father's loss of his child is more than reason can counter.

== Buddhist poetry and modernity ==
As Japan reached the era of industrialized modernity, many of the poets of the Meiji period started to experiment with the European styles of poetic composition. Some poets, notably Miyazawa Kenji—a devout Buddhist who expressed his convictions in his poetry and fiction—often composed poems with Buddhist overtones. His Ame ni mo Makezu (雨ニモマケズ), known to practically every Japanese today, takes its theme (Chapter 14: Peaceful and Joyous Deeds / Jp. Anrakugyō 安楽行) from the Lotus Sutra 妙法蓮華經, which Kenji revered.

Another Buddhist poem that remains well known today, but for non-religious reasons, is the Iroha poem from the Heian period. Originally written in man'yōgana and attributed to Kūkai, this Buddhist poem contains every kana precisely once, and is learned in Japanese primary schools mainly for this reason. Many old-style Japanese dictionaries adhere to the Iroha order.

A modern Indian Sanskrit poet, Vanikavi Dr. Manomohan Acharya, wrote Sri Gautama Buddha Panchakam in simple and lucid Sanskrit through lyrical style.

== Bibliography ==
- F. Bernhard, "Udānavarga: Einleitung, Beschreibung der Handschriften, Textausgabe, Bibliographie." Goettingen: Vandenhoeck & Ruprecht, 1965
- J. Breen and M. Teeuwen. Shinto in History : Ways of the Kami. Honolulu: University of Hawaii Press, 2000. ISBN 978-0-7007-1170-3
- G.C.C. Chang, tr. and Milarepa, The Hundred Thousand Songs of Milarepa. Kessinger Publishing, 2006. ISBN 978-1-4254-8688-4
- E. Cranston. A Waka Anthology. Stanford University Press, 1998. ISBN 978-0-8047-3157-7
- K. Crosby and A. Skilton. "The Bodhicaryāvatāra." Oxford: Oxford University Press, 1998
- W.T. De Bary et al. Sources of Japanese Tradition. 2nd Ed. Vol.1: "From earliest times to 1600." NY: Columbia Univ. Press. 2001 ISBN 978-0-231-12139-2
- D. Dimitrov, "The Legacy of the Jewel Mind. On the Sanskrit, Pali and Sinhalese Works of Ratnamati. A Philological Chronicle (Phullalocanavaṁsa)." Napoli: UNIOR DAAM, 2016
- M. Gibson and H. Murakami. Tantric Poetry of Kukai (Kobo Daishi), Japan's Buddhist Saint : With Excerpts from the Mahavairocana Sutra and I-Hsing's Commentary of the Sutra. Fredonia, N.Y.: White Pine Press, 2008. ISBN 978-0-934834-67-4
- M. Hahn, ed. "Ratnākaraśānti's Chandoratnākara." Kathmandu: Nepal Research Center, 1982
- M. Hahn, ed. "Nāgārjuna's Ratnāvalī. Vol. I: the basic texts (Sanskrit, Tibetan, Chinese)." (Indica et Tibetica, Bd. I.) [ii], vi, 208 pp. Bonn: Indica et Tibetica Verlag, 1982.
- M. Hahn, ed. tr. "Invitation to Enlightenment: Texts by Matricheta & Chandragomin." Berkeley: Dharma Publishing, 2000
- M. Hahn, ed., and Haribhaṭṭa. "Poetical Visions of the Buddha's Former Lives : Seventeen Legends from Haribhatta's Jatakamala,

New Delhi: Aditya Prakashan, 2011.

- M. Hahn, S.S. Bahulkar, Lata Mahesh Deokar, and M.A. Deokar, eds. "Vṛttamālāstuti of Jñānaśrīmitra with Śākyarakṣita's Vṛttamālā(stuti)vivṛti : critical edition." Pune : Deshana & Aditya Prakashan, New Delhi, 2016.
- A. Hanish, ed., and Āryaśūra. "Āryaśūras Jātakamālā. Philologische Untersuchungen zu den Legenden 1 bis 15. Teil 2. Philologischer Kommentar" Marburg : 2005 (Indica et Tibetica 43/1)
- D. Ingalls, "Sanskrit poetry, from Vidyākara's "Treasury". Cambridge (Mass.): Harvard University Press, 1968
- K. Ishihara 石原清志. Shakkyōka no kenkyū : Hachidaishū o chūshin to shite. 釈教歌の研究 : 八代集を中心として Kyōto : Dōhōsha Shuppan 同朋舎出版, 1980. LCCN: 82-805787 (see Webcat: BN01638497; WorldCat OCLC: 16319140)
- E.H. Johnston, ed. and Asvaghosa. The Buddhacarita or Acts of the Buddha. New Delhi: Motilal Banarsidass Pub, Bilingual ed. 1998. ISBN 978-81-208-1279-6
- E.H. Johnston, ed. and Aśvaghoṣa. "Saundarananda of Aśvaghoṣa". Oxford University Press: London, 1928.
- E.H. Johnston, tr. "Saundarananda or Nanda the Fair." London: Oxford University Press, 1932.
- M.R. Kale, ed. tr. "Kālidāsa's Kumārasambhava Cantos I-VII." Bombay: The Standard Publishing Company, 1917.
- J. Konishi and E. Miner. A History of Japanese Literature. Vol. 1. Princeton, N.J.: Princeton University Press, 1984. ISBN 978-0-691-06592-2
- H. Kern, ed., and Āryaśūra. "The Jātaka-mālā: stories of Buddha's former incarnations". Cambridge (Mass.): Harvard University Press, 1891, (rep. 1943).
- T. Kubo and A. Yuyama (tr.) The Lotus Sutra. Revised 2nd ed. Berkeley, Calif. : Numata Center for Buddhist Translation and Research, 2007. Translation from the Chinese of Kumārajīva. ISBN 978-1-886439-39-9
- W.R. LaFleur. The Karma of Words : Buddhism and the Literary Arts in Medieval Japan. Berkeley: University of California Press, 1983. ISBN 978-0-520-05622-0
- P. Kvaerne. "An Anthology of Buddhist Tantric Songs." Bangkok: White Orchid Press, 1986
- H. Lüders, "Das Śāriputraprakaraṇa, ein Drama des Aśvaghoṣa," Sitzungsberichte der königlich Preussischen Akademie der Wissenschaften 17 (1911), pp. 388–411
- D.E. Mills. "The Buddha's Footprint Stone Poems." Journal of the American Oriental Society, Vol. 80, No. 3 (Jul. – Sep., 1960), pp. 229–242 (Available on JSTOR )
- J.S. Mostow. Pictures of the Heart : The Hyakunin-Isshu in Word and Image. Honolulu, Hawai'i: Univ. of Hawai'i Press, 1996. ISBN 978-0-8248-1705-3
- S. Mukhopadhyaya, "The Jātakamālā of Āryaśūra." Delhi: Akshaya Prakashan, 2007.
- W.H. Nienhauser Jr. The Indiana Companion to Traditional Chinese Literature. Vol. 1. Indiana University Press, 1985. ISBN 978-0-253-32983-7
- J.S.Pandey, ed. "Bauddhastotrasaṁgraha." Delhi: Motilal Banarsidass, 1994
- R. Pandey. Writing and Renunciation in Medieval Japan : The Works of the Poet-Priest Kamo No Chomei. Michigan Monograph Series in Japanese Studies. Ann Arbor, MI: Center for Japanese Studies, University of Michigan, 1998. ISBN 978-0-939512-86-7
- N. Sakaki. Inch by Inch: 45 Haiku by Issa. Albuquerque: La Alameda Press, 1999 ISBN 978-1-888809-13-8
- E.U. Ramirez-Christensen and Shinkei. Heart's Flower : The Life and Poetry of Shinkei. Stanford, Calif.: Stanford University Press, 1994. ISBN 978-0-8047-2253-7
- A. Skilton, "How the Nagas Were Pleased by Harsha and The Shattered Thighs by Bhasa". New York: New York University Press, 2009
- D. Smith, "The Birth of Kumāra". New York: New York University Press, 2005.
- J.S. Speyer, tr. "The Jātakamālā or Garland of Birth-Stories by Ārya-śūra." London: Oxford University Press, 1895.
- P.L. Vaidya, ed., and Āryaśūra. "Jātakamālā". Darbhanga: Mithila Institute, 1959.
- B. Watson, tr. Po Chü-i : selected poems. New York : Columbia University Press, 2000. ISBN 978-0-231-11839-2
- B. Watson, "Buddhism in the Poetry of Po Chü-I." Eastern Buddhist 21, no. 1 (1988): 1–22.
- Egan, Charles, and Charles Chu. "Clouds Thick, Whereabouts Unknown : Poems by Zen Monks of China." New York: Columbia University Press, 2010. ISBN 978-0-231-15038-5
