= Shokushika Wakashū =

The Shoku Shika Wakashū (続詞花和歌集, Continued Shika Wakashū) was a Japanese collection of waka poetry. It was initially compiled by Fujiwara no Kiyosuke on the orders of Emperor Nijō, who died before the compilation was finished, and so it was never formally included in the official list of imperial anthologies.
