= Ton'a =

Japanese poet

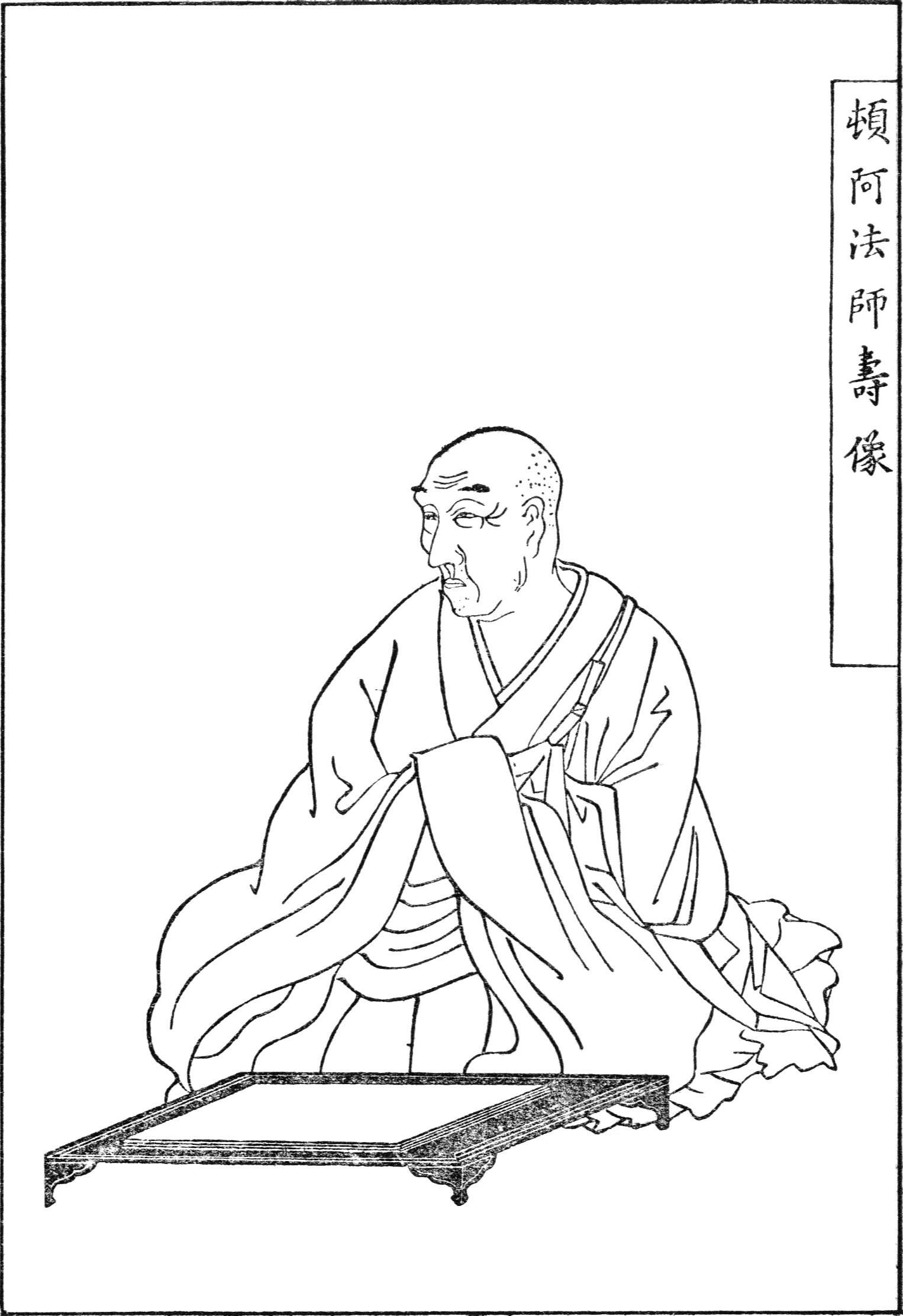
Ton'a

Ton'a (頓阿; 1289–1372), also read as Tonna; lay name – Nikaidō Sadamune (二階堂貞宗), was a Japanese Buddhist poet who was a student of Nijō Tameyo. Ton'a took a tonsure at Enryaku-ji Temple, but was later associated with the Ji sect (founded by Ippen). He looked up to Saigyō's poetic genius.

== Poetry ==
The following are two of his best-known poems:

naku semi no
koe mo hitotsu ni
hibikite
matsu kage suzushi
yama no takitsuse

Translation:

Crying cicadas
are in one voice with the sound
that reverberates
– cool, in the shade of the pines –
from a mountain cascade.

ne ni tatete
nageku wa nani zo
utsusemi no
munashiki yo to wa
shiranu mono ka wa

Translation:

Just what can it be
that makes them cry so loudly?
But, ah, of course: cicadas would know
how empty is this world
of the cicada shell.

== Extant Works ==
=== Ei Sanshu Waka (詠三首和歌/頓阿), 1367 ===
In 1367, Ashikaga Yoshiakira hosted a poetry gathering at Nii-Tamatsushima Shrine. The scroll consist of three poems, and the script's casual arrangements indicates influence from Fujiwara no Yukinari. The scroll originally was owned by Fujita Denzaburō until 1934, subsequently sold in Kyoto in 2014 to collectors Mary and Cheney Cowles, who then donated the scroll to the Metropolitan Museum of Art in 2022 (Accession 2022.432.5).

目にむえぬ 神のあはれむ 道をなを
わきてぞまもる 玉津しま姫

Translation:

The goddess of Tamatsushima
maintains a pathway
from the heavens
so gods can manifest themselves
even if invisible to the eye.
