= Ame ni mo makezu =

Poem by Kenji Miyazawa

Ame ni mo makezu (雨ニモマケズ; 'Be not Defeated by the Rain') is a poem written by Kenji Miyazawa, a poet from the northern prefecture of Iwate in Japan who lived from 1896 to 1933. It was written in a notebook with a pencil in 1931 while he was fighting illness in Hanamaki, and was discovered posthumously, unknown even to his family when it was published. Because "11.3" was written at the top of the opening page with blue pencil, it is presumed to have been written on November 3, 1931, less than two years before he died.

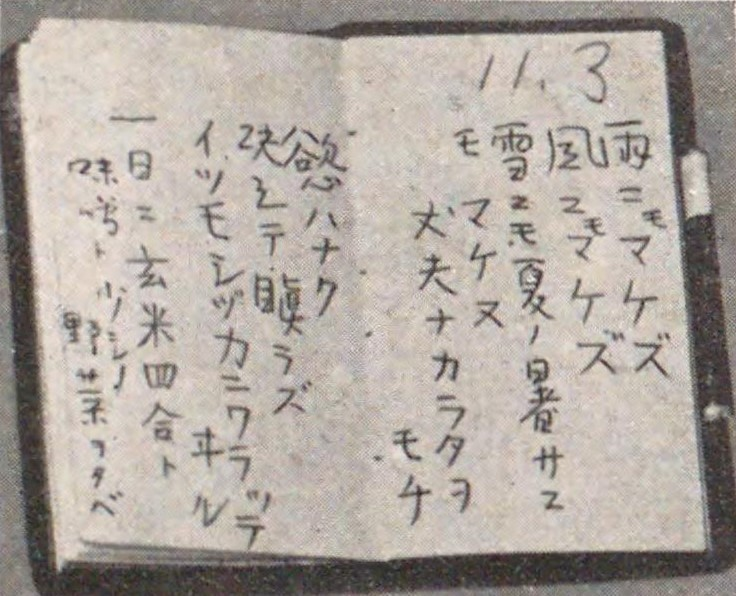
Ame ni mo makezu poem in Miyazawa Kenji's pocket notebook

Kenji always carried a notebook and pencil with him, and there are as many as 15 notebooks. In the notebook with Ame ni mo makezu, Kenji wrote about his thoughts on his sickbed, his religious beliefs, and the important events of his life. Although Kenji did not intend to show Ame ni mo makezu to others as poetry, it has become his most widely known poem and is considered one of his masterpieces. This poem is part of the curriculum of Japanese school children.

In November 1936, a poetry monument engraved with this work was erected in Hanamaki. The poem was popularized by being recorded in "Kaze no Matasaburo", a collection of works for children published in 1939. On April 11, 2011, the poem was read aloud in English by the President of the Cathedral of Samuel Lloyd III at a memorial service was held at the National Cathedral in Washington to mourn the victims of the Great East Japan Earthquake.

== The poem ==
The text of the poem is given below in Japanese, as a transliteration using romaji, and in translation. Aside from including some kanji, the poem was written in katakana rather than hiragana (see style). This was used expression like antithesis. The last sentence reveals subject.

Original

雨ニモマケズ
風ニモマケズ
雪ニモ夏ノ暑サニモマケヌ
丈夫ナカラタヲモチ
慾ハナク
決シテ瞋ラズ
イツモシヅカニワラッテヰル
一日ニ玄米四合ト
味噌ト少シノ野菜ヲタベ
アラユルコトヲ
ジブンヲカンジョウニ入レズニ
ヨクミキキシワカリ
ソシテワスレズ
野原ノ松ノ林ノ蔭ノ
小サナ萓ブキノ小屋ニヰテ
東ニ病氣ノコドモアレバ
行ッテ看病シテヤリ
西ニツカレタ母アレバ
行ッテソノ稻ノ朿ヲ負ヒ
南ニ死ニサウナ人アレバ
行ッテコハガラナクテモイヽトイヒ
北ニケンクヮヤソショウガアレバ
ツマラナイカラヤメロトイヒ
ヒデリノトキハナミダヲナガシ
サムサノナツハオロオロアルキ
ミンナニデクノボートヨバレ
ホメラレモセズ
クニモサレズ
サウイフモノニ
ワタシハナリタイ

Modern orthography

雨にもまけず
風にもまけず
雪にも夏の暑さにもまけぬ
丈夫なからだをもち
慾はなく
決して瞋らず
いつもしずかにわらっている
一日に玄米四合と
味噌と少しの野菜をたべ
あらゆることを
じぶんをかんじょうにいれずに
よくみききしわかり
そしてわすれず
野原の松の林の蔭の
小さな萱ぶきの小屋にいて
東に病気のこどもあれば
行って看病してやり
西につかれた母あれば
行ってその稲の束を負い
南に死にそうな人あれば
行ってこわがらなくてもいいといい
北にけんかやそしょうがあれば
つまらないからやめろといい
ひでりのときはなみだをながし
さむさのなつはおろおろあるき
みんなにでくのぼうとよばれ
ほめられもせず
くにもされず
そういうものに
わたしはなりたい

Transliteration

ame ni mo makezu
kaze ni mo makezu
yuki ni mo natsu no atsusa ni mo makenu
jōbu na karada wo mochi
yoku wa naku
kesshite ikarazu
itsu mo shizuka ni waratte iru
ichi nichi ni genmai yon gō to
miso to sukoshi no yasai wo tabe
arayuru koto wo
jibun wo kanjō ni irezu ni
yoku mikiki shi wakari
soshite wasurezu
nohara no matsu no hayashi no kage no
chiisa na kayabuki no koya ni ite
higashi ni byōki no kodomo areba
itte kanbyō shite yari
nishi ni tsukareta haha areba
itte sono ine no taba wo oi
minami ni shinisō na hito areba
itte kowagaranakute mo ii to ii
kita ni kenka ya soshō ga areba
tsumaranai kara yamero to ii
hideri no toki wa namida wo nagashi
samusa no natsu wa oro-oro aruki
minna ni deku-no-bō to yobare
homerare mo sezu
ku ni mo sarezu
sō iu mono ni
watashi wa naritai

English translation

Unbeaten by the rain
Unbeaten by the wind
Bested by neither snow nor summer heat
Strong of body
Free of desire
Never angry
Always smiling quietly
Dining daily on four cups of brown rice
Some miso and a few vegetables
Observing all things
Leaving myself out of account
But remembering well
Living in a small, thatched-roof house
In the meadow beneath a canopy of pines
Going east to nurse the sick child
Going west to bear sheaves of rice for the weary mother
Going south to tell the dying man there is no cause for fear
Going north to tell those who fight to put aside their trifles
Shedding tears in time of drought
Wandering at a loss during the cold summer
Called useless by all
Neither praised
Nor a bother
Such is the person
I wish to be

== Style ==
Miyazawa chose to write the poem using mainly katakana, a choice that would have been uncommon today as katakana is nowadays (usually) only used in Japanese writing to denote foreign words. However, at the time, katakana rather than hiragana was the preferred syllabary because it is older than hiragana, and was developed in the 9th century. The limited use of kanji might be viewed as a move to make his poem more accessible to the rural folk of northern Japan with whom he spent his life, or perhaps as similar to American poet E. E. Cummings's style in using primarily lower case. However the answer is ambiguous since katakana was regularly used in pre-war Japan for laws, regulations and other normative texts.

== Notes ==
- Cold summers in Japan mean a poorer harvest, hence the line "when the summer is cold, wandering upset."
- The transliteration above is not direct, and uses a modern romaji rendering. Miyazawa wrote in the orthography common to his time, where コハガラナクテ (kohagaranakute) would today be rendered as コワガラナクテ (kowagaranakute), イヒ (ihi) as イイ (ii), and サウ (sau) as ソウ (sou).
- "hidori" in hidori no toki ha namida wo nagashi is generally taken as a simple typo, as Miyazawa made similar typos in his other works. But since hidori means the daily wages of day laborers in the dialect of Hanamaki, some people believe the true meaning of this verse is that Miyazawa cries out of sympathy with the poor farmers who have to work as day laborers.
- The part of Higashi ni byouki no kodomo areba itte kannjo shiteyari nishi ni tukareta haha areba itte sono ina no taba wo oi ("If there is a sick child in the east, I go and take care of it. If there is a tired mother in the west, I go and take the bunch of the rice instead") and minna ni dekunobo to yobare homeraremosezu kunimo sarezu ("I am called a wooden doll by everyone and not praised or dropped") was presumed the sprit of the Lotus Sutra’s Sadaparibu Bodhisattva.
- A memo with tanka about the Lotus Sutra was put in a thin roll in the cylinder part next to the notebook where the pencil was put.

== See also ==
- Buddhist poetry
