= Man'yōshū Jidai-kō =

Early medieval Japanese research work

Man'yōshū Jidai-kō (万葉集時代考) is a Japanese poetic commentary (karon 歌論) compiled in 1189–1195 by the famed waka poet Fujiwara no Shunzei and dedicated to Fujiwara no Yoshitsune, indicating that he maintained close ties to the Kujō house and tutored Yoshitsune in poetry. Man’yōshū jidai-kō is sometimes abbreviated as Manji 万時.

== Contents ==
Man'yōshū Jidai-kō deals simply with the question surrounding the compilation of the Man'yōshū, taking the position that since there is insufficient reliable evidence for the events of the past, drawing easy conclusions about the past would be presumptuous, and based on the poems in the Man'yōshū itself comes down ultimately on the side that dates it to the Nara period. The work is important as a statement of the opinion of Shunzei, a man who was at the pinnacle of the poetic world of his time, when he was in his late seventies (likely around 79 by Japanese reckoning). Man'yōshū Jidai-kō has been translated into English by Małgorzata K. Citko-DuPlantis and Kei Umeda based on the Reizei-ke Shiguretei Bunkozō-bon 冷泉家時雨亭文庫蔵本.

== Textual history ==
To date, six texts of Man’yōshū jidai-kō are known, none of which has been annotated. The earliest extant text, a scroll (kansusō 巻子装) from the Shiguretei Bunko, is believed to have been copied in the mid-Kamakura period by Reizei Tamesuke 冷泉為相 (1263–1328), a son of Fujiwara no Tameie 藤原為家 (1198–1275), based on a copy determined by Tamesuke to have been made by Kujō Motoie 九条基家 (1203–1280), one of the younger sons of Yoshitsune. Two more Reizei-ke texts exist in the form of booklets (sasshi 冊子). The remaining three texts are Motoori Norinaga Kinenkanzō-bon 本居宣長記念館蔵本 from the Museum of Motoori Norinaga in Matsusaka 松阪, Mie Prefecture; Miyagi-ken Shiogama Jinja-bon 宮城県塩釡神社本 from the Shiogama 塩釡 Shrine, Miyagi Prefecture; and Zoku gunsho ruijūbon 続群書類従本, a modern printed edition based on a copy from the archives of the Kunaichō Shoryōbu 宮内庁書陵部 (Imperial Household Agency Bureau of Imperial Records). All three date from the Edo period and are probably derived from the Reizei-ke Shiguretei Bunkozō-bon.
