= Matsuyama tengu =

Japanese noh play

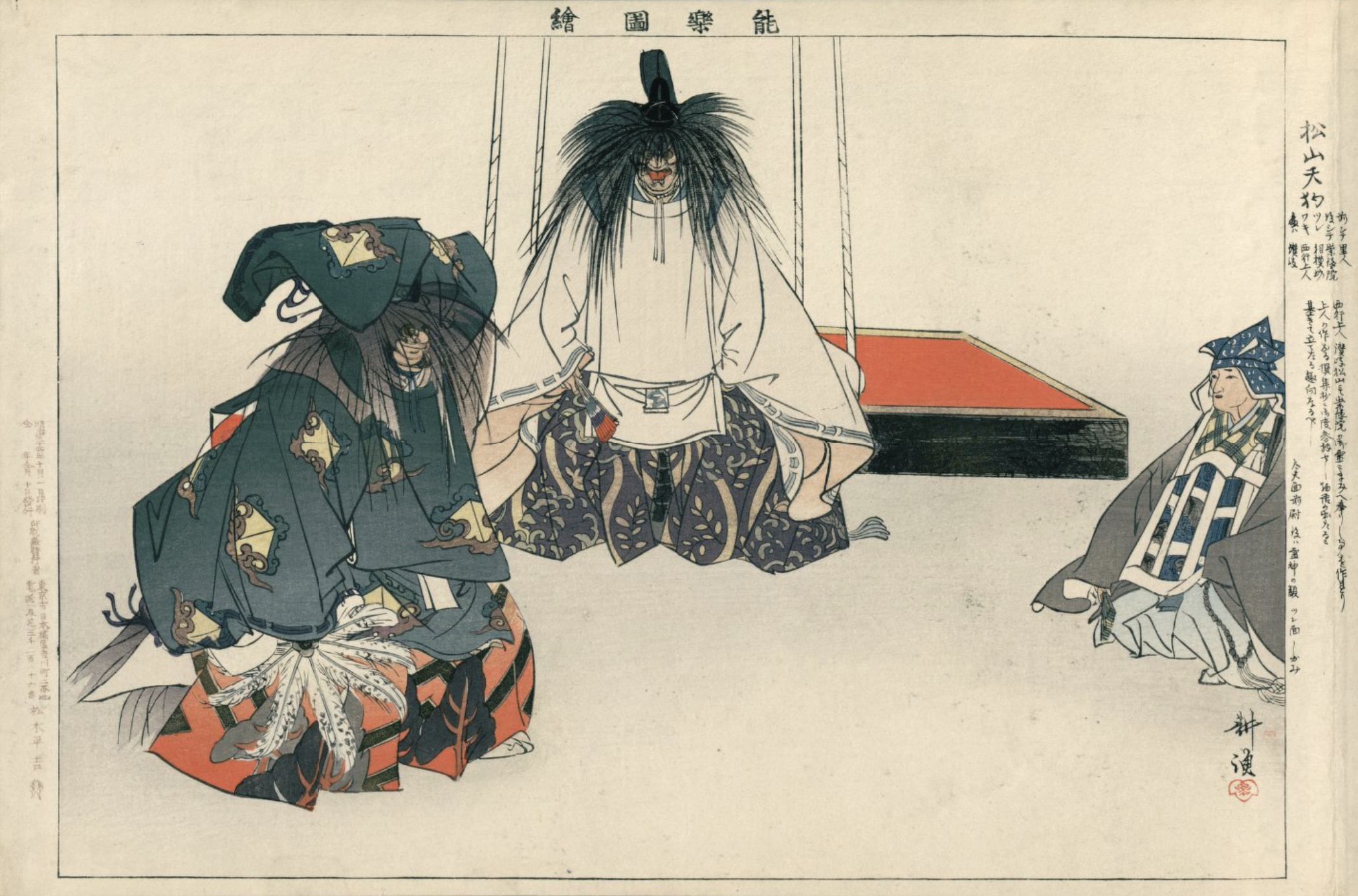
A goblin dances for the ghost of Emperor Sutoku and Saigyō; woodblock print by Kōgyo Tsukioka from the series Nōgaku zue or Pictures of Noh Plays

Matsuyama tengu (松山天狗 Goblins of Matsuyama) is a Noh play revolving around the ex-emperor Sutoku and his ghostly encounter with the poet Saigyō.

== Historical background ==
The failure of the attempt by retired emperor Sutoku to seize power in the Hōgen rebellion led to his exile in Shikoku. His former associate Saigyō was shocked by the events: "A great calamity shook society, and things in the life of Retired Emperor Sutoku underwent inconceivable change". Saigyō thereafter kept in touch with his former emperor, and after his death made a pilgrimage to his place of exile, Matsuyama. There he wrote the tanka:

"Let it be, my lord./ Surely this is nothing/ like the jewel-floored/ palaces of your past, but can/ anything alter what’s occurred?".

== Theme ==
Saigyō's poem played a key role in the Noh play ‘Goblins of Matsuyama'. There, however, it formed part of the encounter between Saigyō and (the spirit of) Sutoku, figured in goblin form, and as a demonic influence.

The tension between the non-attachment offered by the poet/monk’s poem, and the urge for revenge on the part of the ‘goblin’ emperor, formed the heart of the play.

== Influence ==
- Pictures of the goblin encounter became a popular Japanese theme, often drawn directly from the play.
- Shiramini by Ueda Akinari, in his Ugetsu Monogatari, developed the revenge theme of the play, with Sutoku, now king of the goblins, prophesying doom for the whole Taira clan.

== See also ==
- Hōgen Monogatari
- Onryō
- Tengu
