= Rokujō family =

Family in Imperial Japan

Rokujō family 六條家
- Home province: Kyoto, Yamashiro Province
- Parent house: Fujiwara clan
- Founder: Fujiwara no Akisue
- Founding year: Late 11th century

The Rokujō family (六條家) was a poetically conservative faction in the Japanese Imperial court, founded by Fujiwara no Akisue (1055–1123 CE); it was the first clan to specialize in attaining power and influence via success in poetry, and was originally opposed to their opposite numbers amongst the Minamoto clan (such as the innovative Minamoto no Shunrai), although later they would be opposed to a more junior (and poetically liberal) branch of the old and puissant Fujiwara family, as represented by Fujiwara no Shunzei and his son, Fujiwara no Teika. It was also known for, besides its conservative views on the composition of poetry, the quality of its scholar's work on old poetry (because of the allusive nature of waka, and the early confusions of transcription and writing them down, new versions and exegetical works were constantly needed by the court; the situation was especially bad with the Man'yōshū—Brower remarks that "It is doubtful whether more than three or four hundred Man'yō poems could actually be read with accuracy until the commentaries of the priest Senkaku laid the foundations of modern Man'yō scholarship..."). One of the Rokujō—Fujiwara no Akisuke (1090–1155)—compiled the Imperial anthology, the Shika Wakashū.
