= Shika Wakashū =

12th-century anthology of Japanese waka

Shika Wakashū (詞花和歌集; "Collection of Verbal Flowers"), abbreviated as Shikashū, is an imperial anthology of Japanese waka, compiled c. 1151–1154 CE at the behest of the Emperor Sutoku who ordered it in 1144. It was compiled by Fujiwara no Akisuke (1090–1155; a member of the Rokujō). It consists of ten volumes containing 411 poems.

The Shikashū is the shortest of the imperial anthologies. Despite Akisuke's ostensibly conservative nature, it is rather eclectic and has a wide variety of poems, including one by Saigyo.

== See also ==
- Sankashū
- Shin Kokin Wakashū
