= Fujiwara no Akisue =

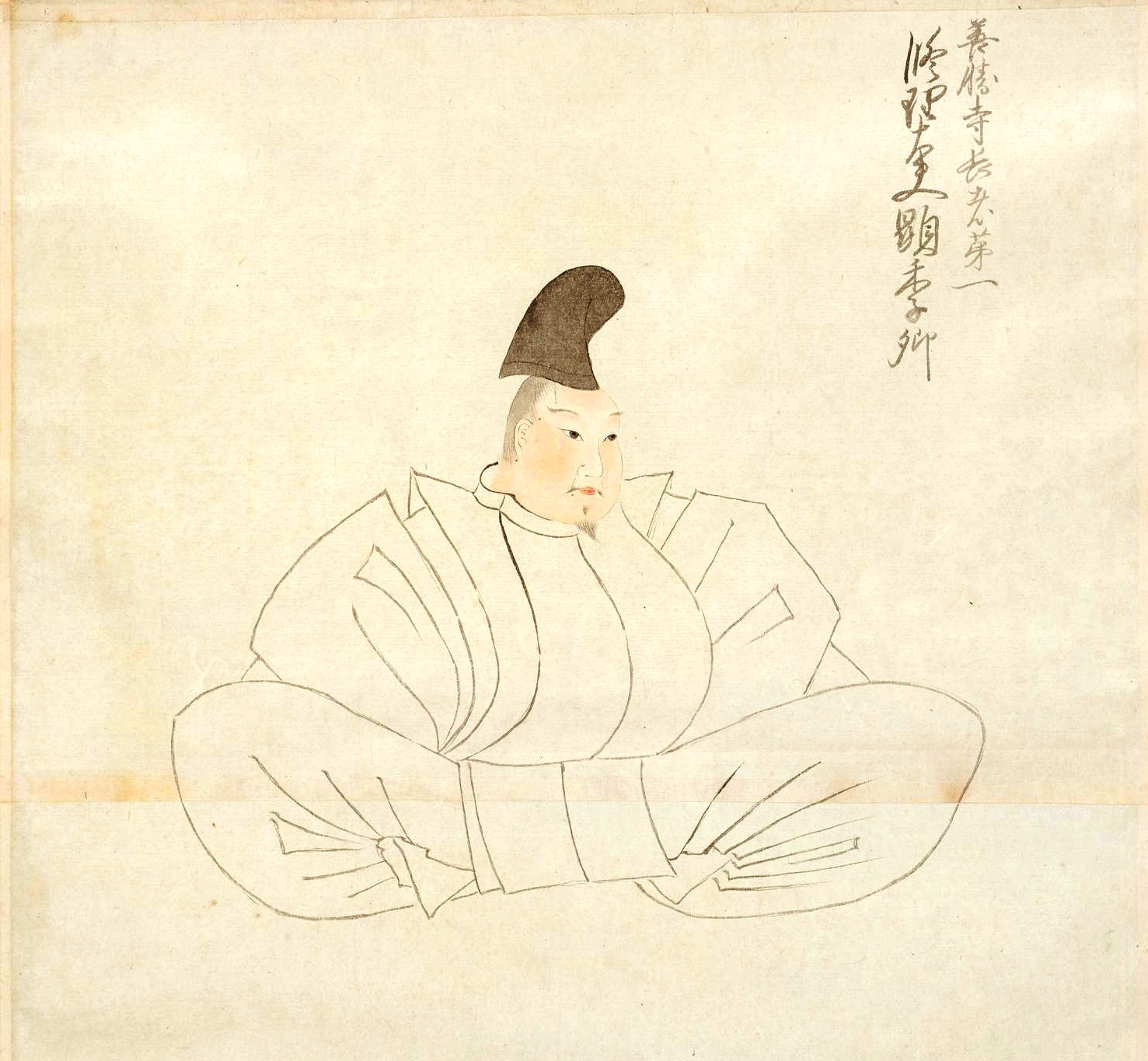

Fujiwara no Akisue (藤原 顕季; 1055 – 27 September 1123) was a noted Japanese poet and nobleman. He was active at the end of the Heian period, and the son of Fujiwara no Takatsune (藤原 隆経). He was also a member of the famous poetic and aristocratic clan, the Fujiwara.

Akisue was close to Emperor Shirakawa, as his mother was the Emperor's nurse, and due to the influence of Fujiwara no Sanesue (藤原 実季), his foster father, who was Dainagon to the Emperor. Starting in 1075, Akisue held a number of local official posts, and by 1109 was appointed as a Dazai Daini (secretary to the administrative officer of several provinces). Akisue was the father of Fujiwara no Akisuke.

== Poetry ==
In 1078 Akisue participated in The Imperial Palace Poetry Match of Shōraku-2. In 1093 he contributed a one-hundred poem set to the Horikawa-in hyakushu, and participated in several other poetry competitions (郁芳門院根合 (Ikuhômon-in neawase), 堀河院艶書合 (Horikawa-in tsuyakotobaawase), and 鳥羽殿北面歌合 (Toba-dono hokumen utaawase)), which firmly established his reputation as a poet.

== Poetry school ==
Akisue's most famous house was built in Kyoto at the crossing of two streets, Rokujō and Karasuma, and the poets of his salon used to meet there. The poetic school that he established came to be called Rokujô. Similarly his descendants formed a clan that came to be called the Rokujō family. His poetic style was very conservative. Members of his salon were many of the more conservative poets of the time, such as Fujiwara no Akisuke, Fujiwara no Kiyosuke, Fujiwara no Motosuke and Fujiwara no Ari'i.e.

Akisue was a scholar of the Man'yōshū and worked to recover and popularize the poetry of Kakinomoto no Hitomaro. Both Akisue and the Emperor revered Hitomaro, and Akisue managed to borrow a famous painting of Hitomaro from the Emperor to make a copy for his own family, which he proudly displayed. In 1118, Akisue held a celebration of Hitomaro at his Rokujô mansion which was attended by the poetry luminaries of the time including Minamoto no Shunrai and Fujiwara no Akisuke. They presented offerings before the painting of Hitomaro and recited both his poems and their own, both Japanese waka and Chinese verse, composed especially for this occasion. This was the first formal ceremony on record dedicated to the veneration of Hitomaro, and began a practice that was later for other esteemed poets.
