= Sankashū =

Collection of poems by Saigyo

Sankashū (山家集; "Collection of a Mountain Home") is a collection of poems by Saigyō, most probably made by the poet himself, and issued c. 1180.

== Dating ==
Because the collection contains no poems from the last decade of Saigyō's life, 1180–1190, he is thought to have closed it c. 1180, and circulated it thereafter.

== Divisions ==
The collection contains 1552 poems, and falls into three parts. The first (1–572) is divided into four sections containing poems of the four seasons; the second (573–1041) into two sections—Love and Miscellaneous; and the third (1042–1152) again into two sections—Miscellaneous Songs and One Hundred Songs.

== Quality ==
Where much court poetry of the time was convoluted, the Sankashū is known for its directness of utterance. His early translator, Hei-Hachuro Honda, valorised Saigyō's poems of solitude over those that were involved in more communal activities. Later critics, however, have paid more attention to how his poetry was rooted both in his private life and the public life of his society.

== See also ==
- Noh plays
- Shika Wakashū
- Tales of the Heike
- Tanka
- Waka
