= Saigyō =

Japanese poet (1118–1190)

Saigyō Hōshi (西行法師)
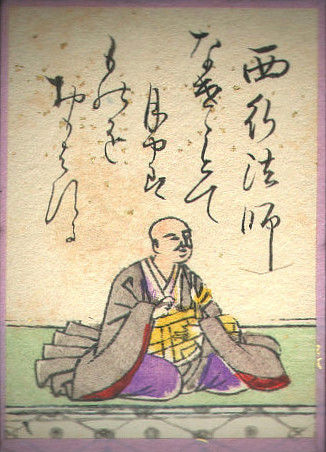
- Saigyō Hōshi in the Hyakunin Isshu
- Born: Satō Norikiyo (佐藤義清); 1118; Kyoto, Japan
- Died: 1190 (aged 71–72)
- Occupation: Poet
- Writing career
- Pen name: Saigyō

Saigyō Hōshi (西行 法師; Japanese pronunciation: [saꜜi.ɡʲoː, -ŋʲoː], 1118 – March 23, 1190) was a Japanese poet of the late Heian and early Kamakura period.

== Biography ==
Born Satō Norikiyo (佐藤義清) in Kyoto to a noble family, he lived during the traumatic transition of power between the old court nobles and the new samurai warriors. After the start of the age of Mappō, Buddhism was considered to be in decline and no longer as effective a means of salvation. These cultural shifts during his lifetime led to a sense of melancholy in his poetry. As a youth, he worked as a guard to retired Emperor Toba, but in 1140 at age 22, for reasons now unknown, he quit worldly life to become a monk, taking the religious name En'i (円位).

He later took the pen name Saigyō (西行), meaning "Western Journey", a reference to Amida Buddha and the Western paradise. He lived alone for long periods in his life in Saga, Mt. Koya, Mt. Yoshino, Ise, and many other places, but he is more known for the many long, poetic journeys he took to Northern Honshū that would later inspire Bashō in his Narrow Road to the Interior.

He was a good friend of Fujiwara no Teika.

Sankashū (山家集; "Collection of a Mountain Home") is Saigyō's personal poetry collection. Other collections that include poems by Saigyō are the Shin Kokin Wakashū and the Shika Wakashū.

He died at Hirokawa Temple in Kawachi Province (present-day Osaka Prefecture) at age 72.

== Style ==
In Saigyō's time, the Man'yōshū was no longer a big influence on waka poetry, compared to the Kokin Wakashū. Where the Kokin Wakashū was concerned with subjective experience, word play, flow, and elegant diction (neither colloquial nor pseudo-Chinese), the Shin Kokin Wakashū (formed with poetry written by Saigyō and others writing in the same style) was less subjective, had fewer verbs and more nouns, was not as interested in word play, allowed for repetition, had breaks in the flow, was slightly more colloquial and more somber and melancholic. Due to the turbulent times, Saigyō focuses not just on mono no aware (sorrow from change) but also on sabi (loneliness) and kanashi (sadness). Though he was a Buddhist monk, Saigyō was still very attached to the world and the beauty of nature.

== Poetry examples ==
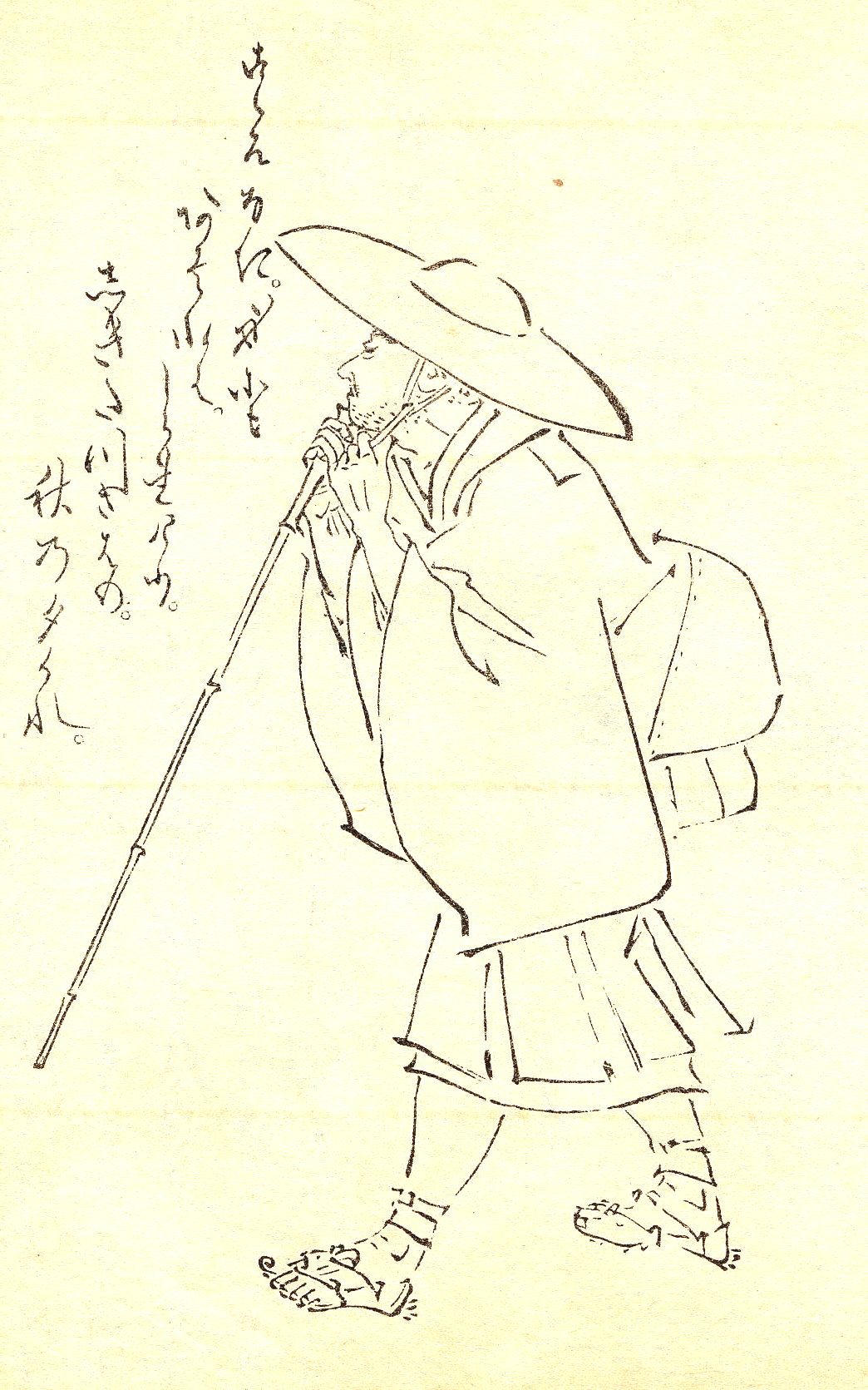
Saigyō by Kikuchi Yōsai

Many of his best-known poems express the tension he felt between renunciatory Buddhist ideals and his love of natural beauty. Most monks would have asked to die facing West, to be welcomed by the Buddha, but Saigyō finds the Buddha in the flowers:

Japanese
Rōmaji
Translation

願はくは
花の下にて
春死なむ
その如月の
望月のころ

Negawaku wa
Hana no moto nite
Haru shinan
Sono kisaragi no
Mochizuki no koro

Let me die in spring
under the blossoming trees,
let it be around
that full moon of
Kisaragi month.

To be "heartless" was an ideal of Buddhist monkhood, meaning one had abandoned all desire and attachment:

Japanese
Rōmaji
Translation

心無き
身にも哀れは
知られけり
鴫立つ沢の
秋の夕暮れ

Kokoro naki
Mi ni mo aware wa
Shirarekeri
Shigi tatsu sawa no
Aki no yūgure

Even a person
free of passion
would be moved to sadness:
autumn evening in a marsh
where snipes fly up.

Saigyō travelled extensively, but one of his favorite places was Mount Yoshino, famous for its cherry blossoms:

Japanese
Rōmaji
Translation

吉野山
こぞのしをりの
道かへて
まだ見ぬかたの
花をたづねむ

Yoshino-yama
Kozo no shiori no
Michi kaete
Mada minu kata no
Hana wo tazunen

I'll forget the trail I marked out
on Mount Yoshino last year,
go searching for blossoms
in directions
I've never been before.

== Legacy ==
- Saigyō's journeys were an inspiration for the court lady Lady Nijō, who records in her Towazugatari that she dreamed of writing a similar travel book after reading Saigyō's work at age 8. Nijō later followed in Saigyō's footsteps when she became a Buddhist nun, visiting many of the places he recorded.
- Bashō subsequently looked back to Saigyō for artistic inspiration. For example, quoting Saigyō's poem on the pine tree at Shiogoshi, he wrote "Should anyone dare to write another poem on this pine tree, it would be like trying to add a sixth finger to his hand".

== In popular culture ==
- 2003: Though her precise relation to Saigyō is unclear, Touhou Project's Saigyōji Yuyuko is certainly inspired by Saigyō; aside from sharing a name, Yuyuko is a ghost sealed to the Saigyō Ayakashi, a youkai cherry tree that was born when a "divinely talented poet" who loved nature chose to die under its blossoms. This is a direct reference to Saigyō's own stated preferences: "Offer up cherry blossoms to the honored dead, those that might mourn my death."
- 2016: The Great Passage, anime, episode 7

== See also ==
- Eguchi (play)
- The Priest and the Willow
- Shigitatsu-an in Oiso, Kanagawa

== Resources ==
- Meredith McKinney. Gazing at the Moon: Buddhist Poems of Solitude, Shambhala Publications, 2021 ISBN 978-1611809428.
- Saigyô, Poems of a Mountain Home, translated by Burton Watson, Columbia University Press, 1991 ISBN 0-231-07492-1 cloth ISBN 0-231-07493-X pbk [233 pp.]
- Saigyô, Mirror for the Moon: A Selection of Poems by Saigyô (1118-1190), translated by William R. LaFleur, New Directions 1978.
- William R. LaFleur. Awesome Nightfall: The Life, Times, and Poetry of Saigyō. Boston: Wisdom Publications, 2003 ISBN 0-86171-322-2 pbk [177 pp] This is an expanded and matured reworking of the material in Mirror for the Moon.
