= Fujiwara no Shunzei =

Japanese poet and court noble (1114–1204)

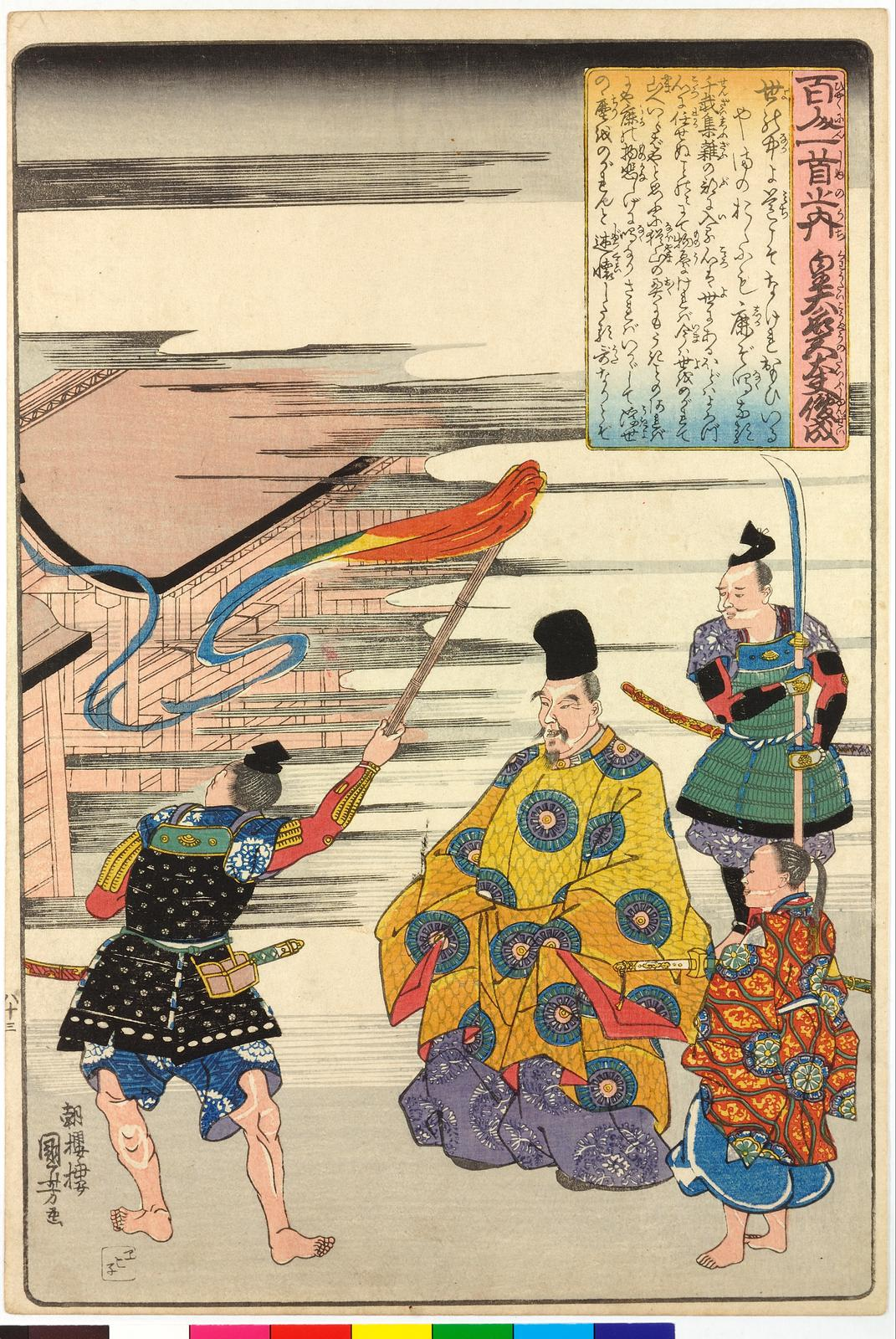
- Shunzei with page and armed attendants (Hyakunin Isshu: print by Utagawa Kuniyoshi)
- Born: 1114
- Died: December 22, 1204
- Occupations: Poet, courtier, and monk

Fujiwara no Toshinari or Shunzei (藤原 俊成; Japanese pronunciation: [ɸɯ̈̀.(ɟ̟͡)ʑí.β̞ä́.ɾä́ nó̞ | tò̞.ɕí.nä̀.ɾʲï̀, -nó̞ tó̞-, -nó̞ (|) ɕɨ́ǹ.d͡zè̞ì, -d͡zè̞è̞]; 1114 – 22 December 1204) was a Japanese poet, courtier, and Buddhist monk of the late Heian period. He was also known by his monastic name Shakua (釈阿) and when younger (1123–67) as Akihiro (顕広). He was noted for his innovations in the waka poetic form and compiling the Senzai Wakashū ("Collection of a Thousand Years"), the seventh imperial anthology of waka poetry.

== Early life ==
Fujiwara no Shunzei was born in 1114. He was a descendant of the statesman Fujiwara no Michinaga and son of Fujiwara no Toshitada of the Mikohidari branch of the influential aristocratic and poetic Fujiwara clan. His father died when he was ten years old and he was adopted by Hamuro Akiyori. As Akiyori's adopted son, he took the name Akihiro (顕広), but in 1167, when he was 53, he returned to the house he had been born into and took the name Toshinari. (Shunzei is the Sino-Japanese reading for the same characters used to write Toshinari.)

== Career ==
Shunzei attained at the imperial court the post of Kōtai Gōgū-daibu (皇太后宮大夫) and held the Senior Third Rank (non-counsellor 非参議).

He was commissioned in 1183 to compile the Senzai Wakashū ("Collection of a Thousand Years"), the seventh imperial anthology of waka poetry, by the Retired Emperor Go-Shirakawa, who despite Shunzei's low rank (he was "Chamberlain to the Empress Dowager", a nominal rank Earl Miner describes as "pitiably low"), admired him. Go-Shirakawa's trust in Shunzei is significant, as imperial anthologies were landmarks in the poetic circles of the court, second to no other events in significance; poets were willing to risk their lives just for the chance to have a poem included.

The Tale of the Heike relates that Shunzei was compiling the Senzai Wakashū during the Genpei War, and that Taira no Tadanori (1144–1184), who was on the opposing side (the one which did not hold the capital where Shunzei lived), ventured into enemy territory to Shunzei's residence, asking him to include a particular poem of his. Tadanori then managed to successfully escape back to his own forces without being apprehended. Shunzei eventually did decide to include Tadanori's poem, but attributed it ("tactfully" as Donald Keene characterizes it) to "Anonymous".

== Poetry ==
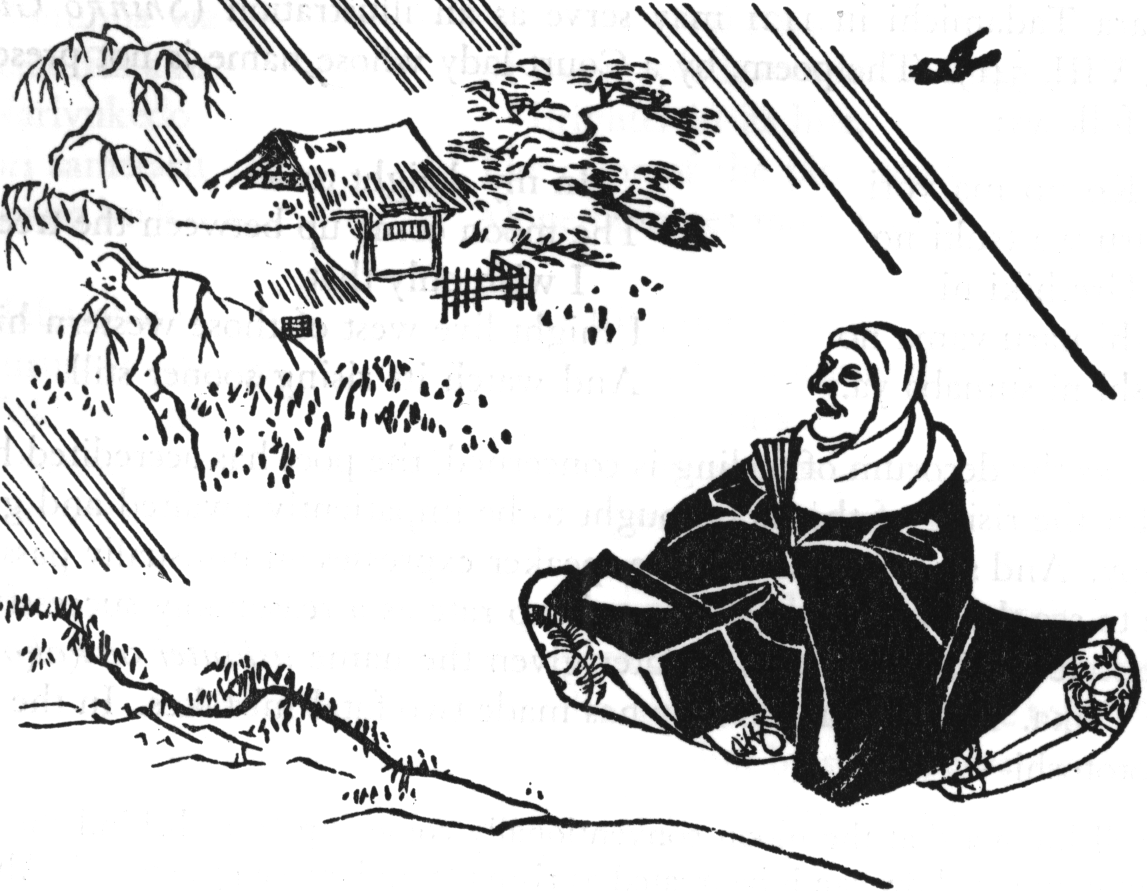
Shunzei reciting his poem on the hotogisu (bird) from the Shinkokinshu (drawing by Hishikawa Moronobu)

As Shunzei's father and grandfather and a number of other relatives were all men of literature and poetry, he began writing and composing poetry at a young age. He tended to hew to an older style of poetry such as that seen in the Man'yōshū and even wrote his first poetic commentary on Man'yōshū—Man'yōshū Jidaikō—but he also drew upon recently imported and translated Tang dynasty Chinese poetry.

From a literary criticism perspective, he notably was an early supporter of the Tale of Genji, and after his 30s and 40s, he was especially known for his criticism and judgments at various poetry gatherings and contests, where he favored poems that displayed his preferred poetic style of yugen (one of the ten orthodox styles of poetry which focused on conveying romantic emotion, with characteristic undertones of nostalgia and regret). His style was sometimes summarized as "old diction, new treatment". He wrote that poems "should somehow... produce an effect of both charm and of mystery and depth. If it is a good poem, it will possess a kind of atmosphere distinct from its words and their configuration and yet accompanying them." An example:

Yū sareba
Nobe no akikaze
Mi ni shimite
Uzura naku nari
Fukakusa no sato.

Translation:

As evening falls,
From along the moors the autumn wind
Blows chill into the heart;
And the quails raise their plaintive cry
In the deep grass of Fukakusa village.

His style was disciplined, determinedly sensitive and emotional. The poet Shinkei (1406–1475) wrote the following about his composition of poetry:

"Very late at night he would sit by his bed in front of an oil lamp so dim it was difficult to tell whether it was burning or not, and with a tattered court robe thrown over his shoulders and an old court cap pulled down to his ears, he would lean on an armrest, hugging a wooden brazier for warmth, while he recited verse to himself in an undertone. Deep into the night, when everyone else was asleep, he would sit there bent over, weeping softly."

== Monk ==
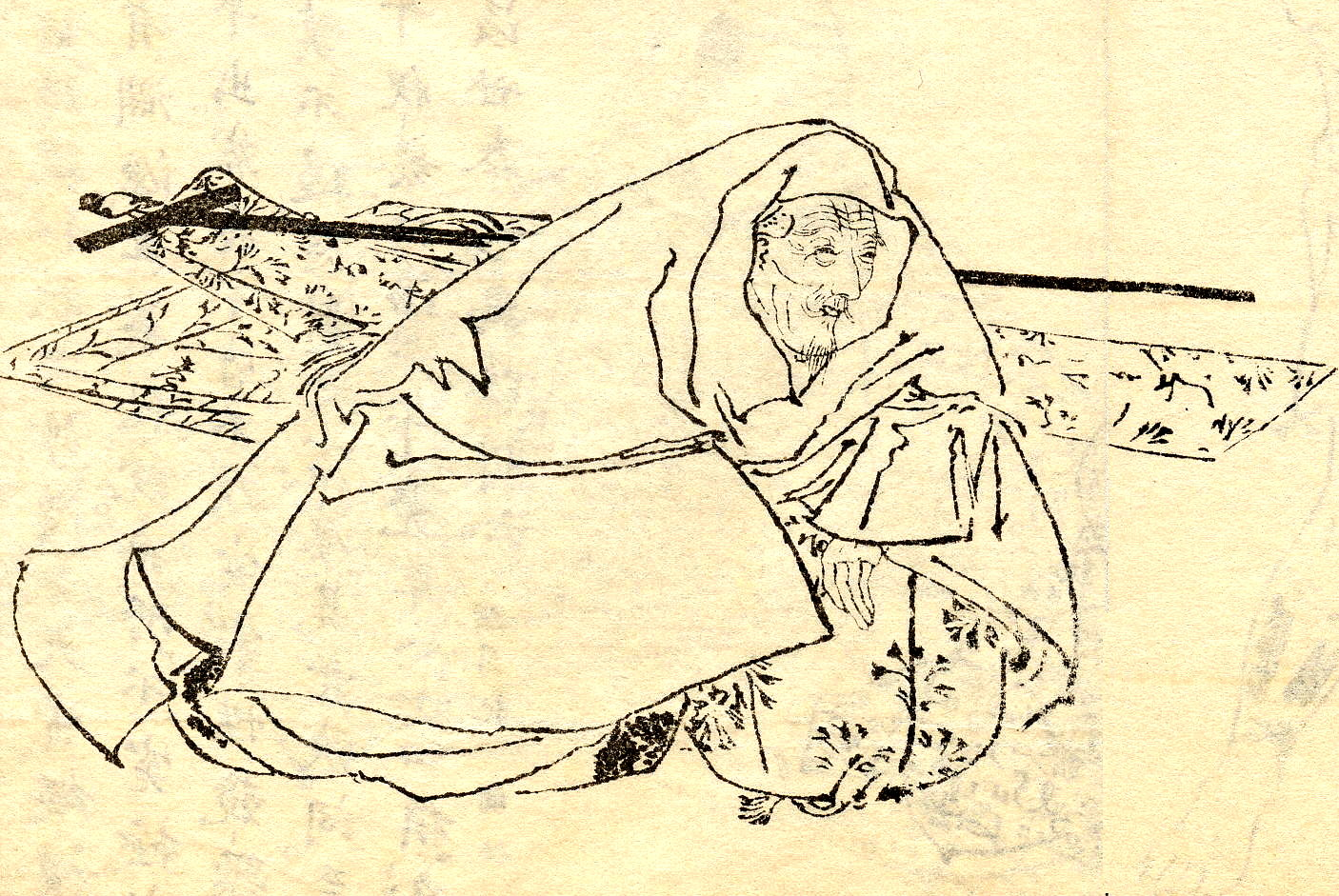
Shunzei drawing by Kikuchi Yosai

Shunzei took Buddhist vows in 1176 when he was 62. He adopted the dharma name of Shakuagaku (釈阿覚) or Shakua (釈阿). Most of his critical philosophy of poetry is known from his sole major work of criticism, written a decade (in 1197, and revised in 1201) after he was asked by the emperor to compile the anthology, Fūteishō ("Notes on Poetic Style through the Ages"). He died on December 22, 1204, at age 90.

== Children ==
Shunzei's son, Fujiwara no Teika, succeeded him in prominence as a poet, and was more successful in court politics than his father. Teika is considered one of the four best poets in Japanese history. Shunzei's granddaughter, Fujiwara Toshinari no Musume (c. 1200; often simply called "Shunzei's Daughter"), whom he raised and taught, was also successful as a poet in the vein of Teika (who sought her advice after Shunzei died).

== See also ==
- Japanese poetry
- Japanese poetry anthologies
