= Fujiwara no Akisuke =

Japanese poet

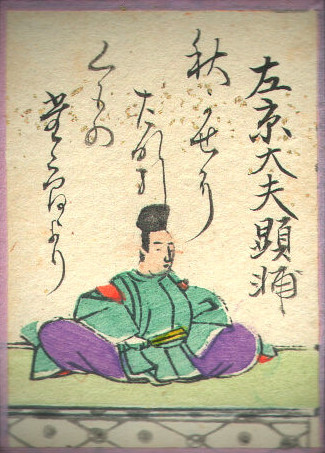
Fujiwara no Akisuke in the Ogura Hyakunin isshu

Fujiwara no Akisuke (藤原 顕輔, 1090–1155) was a waka poet and nobleman active in the Heian period Japan. One of his poems is included in the Ogura Hyakunin Isshu. A member of the Fujiwara clan, he was also known as Sakyō no Daibu Akisuke (左京大夫 顕輔). His father was Fujiwara no Akisue and his son was Fujiwara no Kiyosuke.
