= Chōyaku Hyakunin isshu: Uta Koi =

Japanese manga and television anime series

- Cover of the fourth manga volume

超訳百人一首 うた恋い
- Genre: Romance, historical
- Manga
- Written by: Kei Sugita
- Published by: Media Factory
- Original run: 14 August 2010 – present
- Volumes: 4
- Anime television series
- Directed by: Kenichi Kasai
- Produced by: Hatsuo Nara; Tomoko Takahashi; Shuko Yokoyama
- Written by: Tomoko Konparu
- Music by: Yasunori Mitsuda; Maki Kirioka
- Studio: TYO Animations
- Original network: TV Tokyo, TVO, TVQ, TSC, TVh, TVA, AT-X
- Original run: 3 July 2012 – 25 September 2012
- Episodes: 13

Chōyaku Hyakunin Isshu: Uta Koi (超訳百人一首 うた恋い) (English: "One Hundred Poems Super Translation: Love Song") is a Japanese historical Josei manga written and illustrated by Kei Sugita, and published by Media Factory. An anime adaptation by TYO Animations began airing in July 2012.

Uta Koi is a "super liberal" interpretation of the Hyakunin Isshu anthology of 100 romantic poems by 100 poets compiled during the Heian period.

== Plot ==
Uta Koi details a selection of romantic poems from the Hyakunin Isshu, including the tale of Ariwara no Narihira's affair with imperial consort Fujiwara no Takaiko, the romantic relationship between Narihira's brother Ariwara no Yukihira and his wife Hiroko, amongst others.

== Characters ==
Fujiwara no Teika (藤原 定家)
Voiced by: Yuki Kaji
Main character who introduces poems from the Hyakunin isshu.
Ariwara no Narihira (在原 業平)
Voiced by: Junichi Suwabe
A poetry-loving aristocrat depicted as a womanizing playboy who elopes with Takaiko in a forbidden romance.
Fujiwara no Takaiko (藤原 高子)
Voiced by: Saori Hayami
Daughter of Fujiwara no Nagara and later imperial consort of Emperor Seiwa, who elopes with Narihira.
Ariwara no Yukihira (在原 行平)
Voiced by: Daichi Endō
Older brother of Narihira.
Hiroko (弘子)
Voiced by: Sanae Kobayashi
Wife of Ariwara no Yukihira.
Sadaakira (貞明)
Voiced by: Shotaro Morikubo
Emperor of Japan and son of Takaiko, who is depicted as stubborn, insensitive and mischievous.
Yasuko (綏子)
Wife of Sadaakira who enjoys nature, and has a gentle personality.
Ono no Komachi (小野 小町)
Voiced by: Aya Endō
A woman of renowned beauty, favoured by the emperor. Formerly known by the name of Yoshiko.
Yoshimine no Munesada (良岑 宗貞)
Voiced by: Yuuya Uchida
A man who attempted to elope with Yoshiko, later known as Ono no Komachi, who then later became a monk.
Fun'ya no Yasuhide (文屋 康秀)
Voiced by: Susumu Chiba
A poet who specialises in wordplay.
Fujiwara no Yoshitaka (藤原 義孝)
Voiced by: Akira Ishida
Father of Fujiwara no Yukinari.

== Media ==
=== Manga ===
As of April 2014 four volumes have been published, with the most recent published in December 2013. Over 400,000 copies of the manga series have been printed. The fourth manga volume sold 28,400 copies within the first week of release, ranking within the top 50 on the Oricon comic sales charts.

=== Drama CD ===
On 24 August 2011 the first drama CD volume was released.

=== Anime ===
An anime adaptation of Uta Koi began airing on 3 July 2012. The opening song is "Love Letter from Nanika?" (ラブレター・フロム・何か？) by ecosystem, and the closing song is "Singin' My Lu" by SOUL'd OUT.

==== Episode list ====
| No. | Title | Directed by | Written by | Original release date |
|---|---|---|---|---|
| 1 | "Takaiko and Narihira - Ariwara no Narihira Ason; Yukihira and Hiroko - Chūnagon Yukihira"; Transliteration: "Takaiko to Narihira - Ariwara no Narihira Ason; Yukihira to Hiroko - Chūnagon Yukihira" (Japanese: 高子と業平 在原業平朝臣; 行平と弘子 中納言行平) | Akihisa Shinoda | Tomoko Konparu | 3 July 2012 |
Narihira becomes infatuated with Takaiko, a daughter of the Fujiwara clan, and attempts to woo her. Takaiko initially refuses, as she is to become imperial consort, however eventually engages in an affair with Narihira. The two eventually part, Takaiko becomes a consort of the emperor, and Narihira becomes a respectable general, who then watches over Takaiko and her son until his death. Narihira composes a poem about it (ちはやぶる・・・). Yukihara is assigned to Inaba, and thus will be distant to his wife. His wife bids him farewell, and Yukihara composes a poem about it (立ちわかれ・・・).
| 2 | "Sadaakira and Yasuko - Yōzei In"; Transliteration: "Sadaakira to Yasuko - Yōzei In" (Japanese: 貞明と綏子 陽成院) | Yutaka Yamamoto | Tomoko Konparu | 10 July 2012 |
The son of Takaiko, Sadaakira, becomes emperor. He is depicted as a mischievous boy who pulls pranks on a girl named Yasuko, and the two grow to dislike one another. One day, Sadaakira is relieved from his position as emperor in favour of his uncle, and is forced to marry Yasuko to keep him in check. Albeit deeply hating Sadaakira, Yasuko expresses that she is willing to be his loyal wife. Sadaakira composes a poem for her (筑波嶺の・・・).
| 3 | "Munesada and Yoshiko - Sōjō Henjō"; Transliteration: "Munesada to Yoshiko - Sōjō Henjō" (Japanese: 宗貞と吉子 僧正遍昭) | Mitsutaka Yoshitani | Yuka Yamada | 17 July 2012 |
Munesada, upon learning of his sister Yoshiko's plans to become an imperial servant, wishes to elope with her. She declines, and gives the task of having Munesada meet her for one hundred consecutive nights. Munesada attempts this task, and on the 100th night a storm almost kills him on the journey to meet Yoshiko. Yoshiko expresses that the still refuses to give up on her ambitions as an imperial servant, and Munesada gives up eloping with her. Munesada composes a poem about it (あまつ風・・・).
| 4 | "Yasuhide and Narihira - Fun'ya no Yasuhide"; Transliteration: "Yasuhide to Narihira - Fun'ya no Yasuhide" (Japanese: 康秀と業平 文屋康秀) | Yōji Satō | Yuka Yamada | 24 July 2012 |
Yasuhide is an inconfident poet who specialises in wordplay. Upon meeting Narihira during a gathering of poets, the two trespass the living quarters of Ono no Komachi, and the three engage in moon gazing. Later, whilst alone with Narihira, Yasuhide ends up in an argument with him; Yasuhide demonstrates his style of poetry by composing a wordplay poem (吹くからに・・・) upon seeing a gust of wind, demonstrating the difference in character between himself and Narihira.
| 5 | "Going East from Kyoto - Ono no Komachi; Tsurayuki and Kisen - Kisen Hōshi"; Transliteration: "Azumakudari - Ono no Komachi; Tsurayuki to Kisen - Kisen Hōshi" (Japanese: 東下り 小野小町; 貫之と喜撰 喜撰法師) | Michita Shiraishi | Tomoko Konparu | 31 July 2012 |
Yasuhide is assigned to Mikawa, and prior to departing sends Komachi a letter of his situation. Narihira, Yasuhide and Komachi spend a night together having a moon gazing session, and Komachi writes a poem (花の色は・・・) about her regrets and how old she is getting. Upon suggestion by Narihira, the three decide to travel eastward towards Mount Tsukuba. News of the trio traveling eastward is spread to Kisen, who does not think it is true. Tsurayuki is taking notes as if interviewing him. He also informs of rumors involving Ise Monogatari based on Narihira's adventures. In reaction, he recites a poem (わがいほは・・・) based on how Yasuhide visited him once, about people and poetry. Tsurayuki explains how poetry are meant to please emperors (explaining the poetry anthologies collected by them). Teika finishes the episode with the fact the Six Poetic Geniuses lived where poets were not respected, but who continue for their passion of their poems.
| 6 | "Uta Hen+"; Transliteration: "Utahen. +" (Japanese: うた変。+) | Akihisa Shinoda | Tomoko Konparu | 7 August 2012 |
A plotless filler episode involving the personas of the Hyakunin Isshu and the shenanigans that occur between them, many of them significantly anachronistic: a grand prix race around the Heian capital (using oxen and carts instead of racecars), a television interview (Teika's Room), and a trading card battle: G1 Grand Prix in Heian-kyō: Teika and Yoritsuna comment on the first ox-cart race in the Heian capital. During one of the segments, sake was drunk to one of the bulls and the entire "pit stop" is in a mess. At the end, the only cart that escaped the fighting was Munesada's, but his ox and cart fell to the Kamogawa after the wooden bridge broke down. Teika's Room (定家の部屋, Teika no heya): A television interview, featuring poets of the Hyakunin Isshu and their personas and histories. Heian card battle (平安歌人札合戦, Heian kajin-fuda gassen): During a segment of Teika's Room, Teika punches Kintō in the face. Assuming that was an attitude problem, Kintō challenges Teika to a card battle, with Teika using the Hyakunin Isshu and Kintō the compilations and divisions of the Thirty-Six Poetry Immortals. In the end, Teika's close victory was disrupted by Tsurayuki, who advises both to become friends instead of fighting. Kintō ask for an autograph from Tsurayuki.
| 7 | "Yoshitaka and Minamoto no Yasumitsu's Daughter - Fujiwaranoyoshitaka; Kō no Naishi and Michitaka - Gidōsanshinohaha"; Transliteration: "Yoshitaka to Minamoto no Yasumitsu no Musume - Fujiwaranoyoshitaka; Kō no Naishi to Michitaka - Gidōsanshinohaha" (Japanese: 義孝と源保光の娘 藤原義孝; 高内侍と道隆 儀同三司母) | Kinsei Nakamura | Mayumi Morita | 14 August 2012 |
Yoshitaka is courting a woman of the Minamoto clan, however does not meet her in person and merely writes letters, much to her dismay. Upon almost being killed in a prank, Yoshitaka realises the value of his life, and meets with his lover to elope with her. Yoshitaka writes a poem (君がため・・・ ながくもがなと・・・) about his feelings. Michitaka is seeking a wife, and attempts to elope with Ko no Naishi (also named Takako). However, she is suspicious of men and their ambitions and desires, and does not wish to mingle with a noble known for womanising. Michitaka explains that although he was a womaniser, his love for Ko no Naishi is sincere, and that he shall womanise no more. They elope, however Takako still has her fears, and she expresses this in a poem (忘れじの・・・).
| 8 | "Suenomatsuyama - Kiyoharanomotosuke; Sanekata to Nagiko - Fujiwaranosanekataason"; Transliteration: "Suenomatsuyama -Kiyoharanomotosuke; Sanekata to Nagiko - Fujiwaranosanekataason" (Japanese: 末の松山 清原元輔; 実方と諾子 藤原実方朝臣) | Akira Shimizu | Yuka Yamada | 21 August 2012 |
Before she became Sei Shōnagon, Nagiko's father is ready to move to the capital with her and her brother Munenobu, who is in love by someone named Suenomatsuyama. Later after the two lovers parted, Suenomatsuyama married another man, and Munenobu was heartbroken. The father tries to calm his feelings down by writing a letter, but he does not want to show her feelings. As witness, Nagiko reads her father's poem (契りきな・・・) about relationships. A visitor named Fujiwara no Sanekata visits the house of Nagiko, under responsibility by Motosuke. Sanekata wants to get inside her house for cold reasons, but she would feel uncomfortable. Despite, she accepts her into her home, talking about poetry for one day. Sanekata writes a poem (かくとだに・・・) about his visit.
| 9 | "Shōnagon and Yukinari - Sei Shōnagon"; Transliteration: "Shōnagon to Yukinari - Sei Shōnagon" (Japanese: 少納言と行成 清少納言) | Michita Shiraishi | Mayumi Morita | 28 August 2012 |
Yukinari has never smiled after his father's death. Then, he was called to the residence of Empress consort Teishi and was to meet the famous poet Sei Shōnagon. He also notices Sanekata, who was Shōnagon's former lover. After Teishi was banished from the capital, rumors spread of Shōnagon also leaving as well. Yukinari went to their exile and exchange advice with her. After multiple meetings, Teishi and Shōnagon return to the capital a year after the empress's exile. From there, Yukinari begins to have feelings for the famous author of Makura no Sōshi but continue to exchange advice. Then, Shōnagon writes a poem to Yukinari (夜をこめて・・・), then Yukinari replies—that her guard is always off—with another poem. They meet again at the residence, and Yukinari calls out his feelings for her. Shōnagon decides that only her heart will be open, not her love. Yukinari replies that she shows him her face. Still, Shōnagon refuses to do so.
| 10 | "Nakoso Falls - Dainagonkintō"; Transliteration: "Nakoso no taki - Dainagonkintō" (Japanese: 名古曽の滝 大納言公任) | Yōji Satō | Mayumi Morita | 4 September 2012 |
Kintō sends Sei Shonagaon the second part of a coming-of-spring poem. She has some problems with it, but is able to write the first part of the poem, completing it. Amazed, a Fujiwara poet recommends a title by the Emperor. The poem is revealed to be based on a work by the Chinese poet Bai Juyi. Kintō mentions Sanekata's visit in episode 8 and his fate, a waterfall blocked by rocks, and the Emperor's protection of Teishi. Concerning the waterfall, Kintō recites a poem to Yukinari (滝の音は・・・), remembering as to forgetting people. Meanwhile, the Emperor has two wives, Teishi and Shōshi, the latter becomes the new Empress. Shonagon decides to protect Teishi. Later, news of Teishi died after giving birth to a son spreads to the Fujiwara poets. Shonagon draws a tear to her hand as the other court ladies circle the court empress. Yukinari has been avoiding Shōshi since she became Empress. Shonagon hears clucking voices as Yukinari wants to talk with her, talking about leaving the capital. Yukinari decides to protect her, but Shonagon is worried not just Teishi's children, but also her famous work, Makura no Sōshi that also focused on Teishi's court life. They share a kiss, but Shonagon encourages to push forward. Yukinari serves Teishi's son Atsuyasu until the prince's death. Teishi's poem (夜もすがら・・・ 恋ひむ涙の・・・) from the Hyakunin Shuka was read, which Teika did not include in the Hyakunin Isshu. Instead, another of Teika's works was based on Makura no Sōshi and therefore the famous work is actually based on the empress herself.
| 11 | "Kaoriko and Fujiko - Murasaki Shikibu"; Transliteration: "Kaoriko to Fujiko - Murasaki Shikibu" (Japanese: 香子と藤子 紫式部) | Shinichi Masaki | Tomoko Konparu | 11 September 2012 |
Under Empress Shōshi (mentioned in the previous episode), Kaoriko has trouble writing The Tale of Genji, caused by both pressure and humiliation by fellow court ladies. She retells flashbacks from her childhood with her old friend Fujiko, who admires her and her poetry. Her flashbacks cut off when one of the court ladies say that Fujiko is in the capital and is going to leave soon. When Kaoriko runs to her friend, she is too late, and Kaoriko can only see a glimpse of her. A messenger gives Fujiko a letter in the form of a poem from Kaoriko (めぐりあひて・・・). Finally, Fujiko decides to write the next parts The Tale of Genji not as a romantic story but as one that expresses the strength of women, and also that Fujiko can remember her more. At the end of the episode, Kaoriko presents the next chapter of the Tale of Genji to the Empress.
| 12 | "Michimasa and Masako - Sakyōnodaibumichimasa; Ukiyo's Moon - Sanjōnoin"; Transliteration: "Michimasa to Masako - Sakyōnodaibumichimasa; Ukiyo no Tsuki - Sanjōnoin" (Japanese: 道雅と当子 左京大夫道雅; うき世の月 三条院) | Kinsei Nakamura | Yuka Yamada | 18 September 2012 |
Michimasa, descended from a house with no future, dreams of a thriving family. As he passes through the capital, he is called by a princess, Masako, who was daughter of the Emperor Sanjō and an incoming High Priestess. Masako wants to see the palace where she was born, despite her elder servant always go with her. Michimasa accepts and takes her to a good view of the palace, introduces the houses and brings simple gifts from the capital: flower, grass, meat, and dirt. Later, the reigning emperor Sanjō resigns, Masako's term as High Priestess ended. Masako receives a letter from Michimasa and the latter enters the Palace. There, they meet again but pressure builds as she wants to be with him, breaking tradition, as Michimasa thinks about what others are going to react. He decides to become worthy of her. By tradition, Masako cannot marry a man of a lower rank. As he was training his swordsmanship, it was too late, as Masako's father knows of their secret love and discharged the elder servant, who tells what happened to Michimasa. He runs to the palace gates but does not knock. Instead, he ties a poem (今はただ・・・) to a branch near the walls, who hopes that someone can bring it to Masako. After being heartbroken, Masako watches the moon with his father the former Emperor, talking about his sight and Michimasa, the latter Masako does not want to talk about more. Flashbacks from the first part of the episode are seen, then emotions change; everything was her fault, denying her place in the royal family. The retired Emperor plans to become a monk. Sanjō expresses his despair in a poem (心にも・・・) he wrote when he retired. In turn, Masako decides to seal her love with Michimasa and become a nun, following her father. But she thinks Michimasa will reunite with her and be truly in love in the second life.
| 13 | "Teika and Noriko - Shokushi Naishinnō - Gonchūnagonsadaie"; Transliteration: "Teika to Noriko - Shokushi Naishinnō - Gonchūnagonsadaie" (Japanese: 定家と式子 式子内親王 権中納言定家) | Yōji Satō | Yuka Yamada | 25 September 2012 |
Teika (who has been on minor appearances in all episodes of the anime, informing us about the Hyakunin Isshu) refuses to follow his father's footsteps of being a poet. The father is worried. A passing monk named Saigyō makes Teika a different kind of poet. Meanwhile, Teika's father teaches poetry to Noriko. His plan is to force Teika into being a poet in his favor. Teika was invited to Noriko's household and began to exchange poetry with the princess, despite their love poems are to be assumed make-believe. Meanwhile, Teika's father looks at one of Noriko's poems (玉のをよ・・・), but Teika disrupts his investigation. His father advises Teika to marry another woman. As Teika enters the princess's house, Teika begins to build up pressure as Noriko accepts Teika following his father's advice. On the other hand, Noriko's interests were only poetry, and poetry is her only form of expression. In anger, Teika confesses, but Noriko becomes angry as well. But because Noriko wants Teika to listen to his poems, Teika comes close to her. Years later, Noriko dies, and Teika is left lonely and tries to give up poetry. But on his mind, Noriko repeats that only poetry will make her (and him) free. He recites one of his own poems (来ぬ人を・・・). Diligent to continue poetry, Teika finishes the last of the poetry of Yoritsuna's house, the 100 poems on the wall now recognized as the "Hyakunin Isshu".
