= Ōe no Otondo =

Japanese courtier, Confucian scholar and kanshi poet

- 大江音人
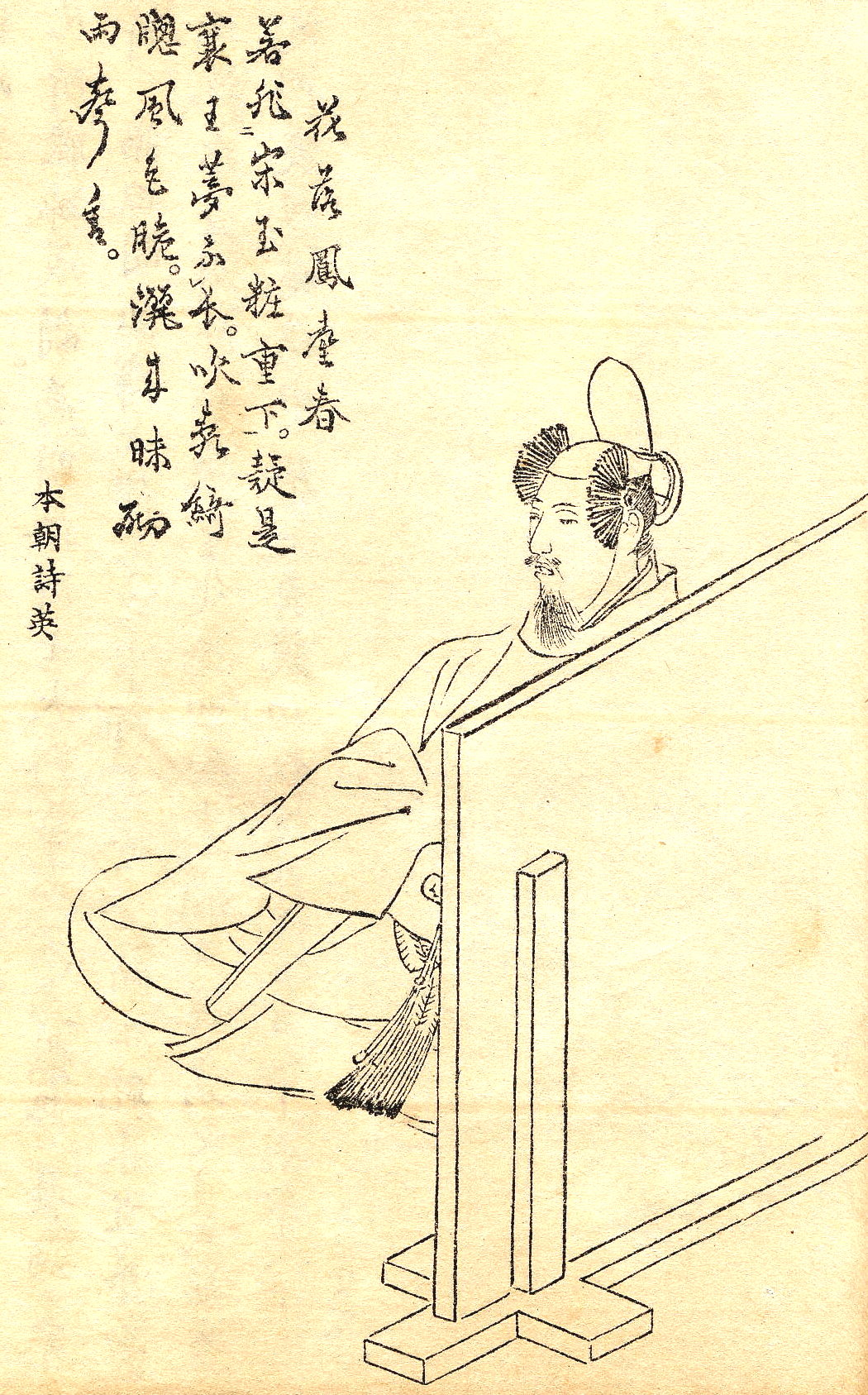
- Ōe no Otondo by Kikuchi Yōsai.
- Born: 811
- Died: November 3, 877; Kyoto
- Children: Ōe no Chisato, Ōe no Chifuru
- Relatives: Emperor Heizei (paternal grandfather), Fujii no Fujiko (paternal grandmother), Prince Abo (father), Ariwara no Yukihira (half-brother), Ariwara no Narihira (half-brother), Ariwara no Muneyana (nephew), Ariwara no Shigeharu (nephew), Ariwara no Motokata (grand-nephew)
- Writing career
- Language: Japanese, Chinese (kanbun/kanshi)
- Period: early Heian
- Genre: kanshi

Ōe no Otondo (大江音人; also known as Gōshō-kō; 811—877) was a Japanese courtier, Confucian scholar and kanshi poet of the early Heian period.

== Biography ==
Otondo was born in 811.

He was a grandson of Emperor Heizei through his father, Prince Abo. The 14th-century work Sonpi Bunmyaku refers to him as Prince Abo's grandson, but the dates do not match up, so the Zoku Honchō Ōjōden (続本朝往生伝) and other works are probably correct in calling him Prince Abo's son.

The waka poets Ariwara no Yukihira and Narihira were his brothers.

He died in 877.

=== Descendants ===
Among his children were Ōe no Chisato and Ōe no Chifuru (大江千古).

== Names ==
His clan name was initially written as 大枝, but was changed to 大江 in 866.

He is occasionally called by the honorific name Gōshō-kō (江相公).
