= Ariwara clan =

Japanese clan

Ariwara clan 在原氏
- Parent house: Imperial family
- Founding year: Kōnin (810-824)

The Ariwara clan (在原氏, Ariwara-uji; also known as the Arihara clan) was a Japanese noble family of imperial descent.

== Name ==
The name of the clan can also be read in Arihara.

== History ==
The clan was initially formed during the Kōnin era (810–824) in the reign of Emperor Saga when the two sons of former Imperial Prince Takaoka (廃太子高岳親王, hai-taishi Takaoka-shinnō), Yoshifuchi and Yasusada, were granted the name "Ariwara." In 826, following a request by Takaoka's brother Prince Abo (阿保親王, Abo-shinnō), the latter's sons Yukihira, Narihira, Morihira (守平) and Nakahira (仲平) were also given this name. The descendants of Narihira, a great waka poet, continued to flourish. However, the clan remained politically obscure due to pressure from the powerful Fujiwara clan.

== Family tree ==
Emperor Heizei
Prince Abo	Prince Takaoka
Prince Kanemi	Nakahira	Yukihira	Morihira	Narihira	Yukiyoshi	Ariwara no Yoshifuchi	Ariwara no Yasusada
Hiroshi	Princess	Tohira	Tomoyuki	Motohira	Fumiko	Muneyana	Takashina no Moranao	Shigeharu	Aiko	Katsuhira	Yoriharu
Tokiharu	Motokata	Motokiyo	Princess	Kenshin	Takashige	Yasuhira	Tokiharu	Yasuhira	Takashige	Nakashige	Aiyasu
Princess	Korenori	Shigesumi	Narimitsu	Toshinobu
Narimasa	Tsugushige	Yorihiro
Muneya	Sumimoto	Nagano Nariyori
Yorisuke	(Nagano clan)
Tomosuke
Mikuni
Hiromi
Tomotame
