= Ōe no Chisato =

Japanese poet and scholar (f. 889–923)

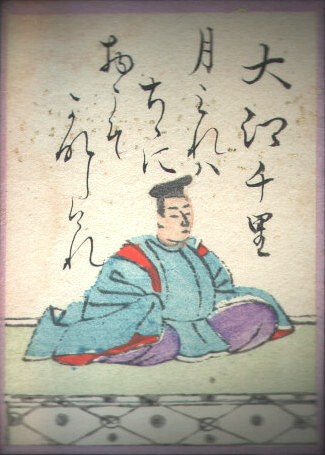
Ōe no Chisato, from the Ogura Hyakunin Isshu

Ōe no Chisato (大江千里) was a Japanese waka poet and Confucian scholar of the late ninth and early tenth centuries. His exact birth and death dates are unknown but he flourished around 889 to 923. He was one of the Chūko Sanjūrokkasen and one of his poems was included in the Ogura Hyakunin Isshu.

He was a son of Ōe no Otondo (大江音人) and a nephew of Ariwara no Yukihira and Ariwara no Narihira. Ten of his poems were included in the Kokin Wakashū and fifteen in later imperial anthologies.

He was the author of the kudai waka, also known as the chisato-shū. A selection of waka based on lines from various Chinese poems.

The following poem by him was included as No. 23 in Fujiwara no Teika's Ogura Hyakunin Isshu:

Japanese text	Romanized Japanese	English translation
月みれば ちぢにものこそ 悲しけれ わが身一つの 秋にはあらねど	Tsuki mireba chi-ji ni mono koso kanashikere wa ga mi hitotsu no aki ni wa aranedo	Looking at the moon thoughts of a thousand things fill me with sadness— but autumn's dejection does not come to me alone.

== Bibliography ==
- McMillan, Peter. 2010 (1st ed. 2008). One Hundred Poets, One Poem Each. New York: Columbia University Press.
- Suzuki Hideo, Yamaguchi Shin'ichi, Yoda Yasushi. 2009 (1st ed. 1997). Genshoku: Ogura Hyakunin Isshu. Tokyo: Bun'eidō.
