= Ariwara no Narihira =

Japanese writer, courtier and waka poet (825–880)

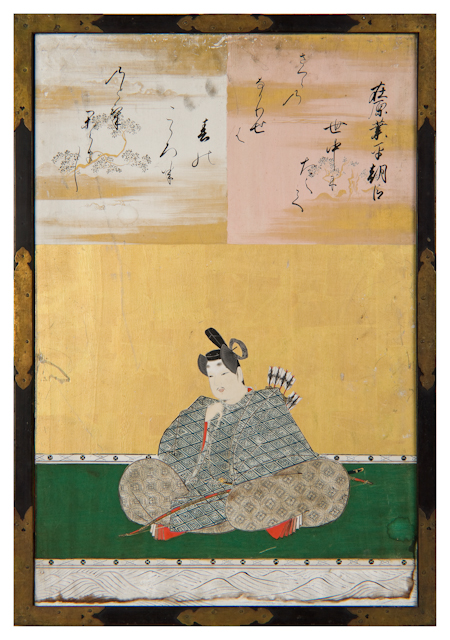
- Ariwara no Narihira (1648)
- Native name: 在原業平
- Born: 825
- Died: 9 July 880 (aged 54–55)
- Language: Early Middle Japanese
- Period: early Heian
- Genre: waka
- Subject: nature, romantic love
- Spouse: unknown
- Children: Ariwara no Muneyana; Ariwara no Shigeharu; Takashina no Moronao (according to tradition – see below); Emperor Yōzei (according to tradition – see below); Ariwara no Aiko married Fujiwara no Yasunori had 1 son: Fujiwara no Kiyotsura
- Relatives: Emperor Heizei (paternal grandfather); Fujii no Fujiko (paternal grandmother); Emperor Kanmu (maternal grandfather); Fujiwara no Minamiko (maternal grandmother); Prince Abo (father); Princess Ito (mother); Ariwara no Yukihira (half-brother); Ōe no Otondo (half-brother); Ōe no Chisato (nephew); Ariwara no Motokata (grandson)

Ariwara no Narihira (在原 業平; Japanese pronunciation: [a.ɾi.wa.ɾa no (|) na.ɾiꜜ.çi.ɾa], 825 – 9 July 880) was a Japanese courtier and waka poet of the early Heian period. He was named one of both the Six Poetic Geniuses and the Thirty-Six Poetic Geniuses, and one of his poems was included in the Ogura Hyakunin Isshu collection. He is also known as Zai Go-Chūjō, Zai Go, Zai Chūjō or Mukashi-Otoko.

There are 87 poems attributed to Narihira in court anthologies, though some attributions are dubious. Narihira's poems are exceptionally ambiguous; the compilers of the 10th-century Kokin Wakashū thus treated them to relatively long headnotes.

Narihira's many renowned love affairs have exerted a profound influence on later Japanese culture. Legends have held that he had affairs with the high priestess of the Ise Grand Shrine and the poet Ono no Komachi, and that he fathered Emperor Yōzei. His love affairs inspired The Tales of Ise, and he has ever since been a model of the handsome, amorous nobleman. Narihira was considered an avatar of Jūichi-men Kannon.

== Biography ==
=== Birth and ancestry ===
Ariwara no Narihira was born in 825. He was a grandson of two emperors: Emperor Heizei through his father, Prince Abo; (Note: The Daijisen entry "Ariwara no Narihira" names Prince Abo as his father, and its entry on the latter ("Abo-shinnō") names Emperor Heizei as his father.) and Emperor Kanmu through his mother, Princess Ito. He was the fifth child of Prince Abo, but was supposedly the only child of Princess Ito, who lived in the former capital at Nagaoka. Some of Narihira's poems are about his mother.

Abo was banished from the old capital Heijō-kyō (modern Nara) to Tsukushi Province (within modern Fukuoka) in 824 due to his involvement in a failed coup d'état known as the Kusuko Incident. Narihira was born during his father's exile. After Abo's return to Heijō, in 826, Narihira and his brothers Yukihira, Nakahira and Morihira were made commoners and given the surname Ariwara. The scholar Ōe no Otondo was also a brother of Narihira's.

=== Political career ===
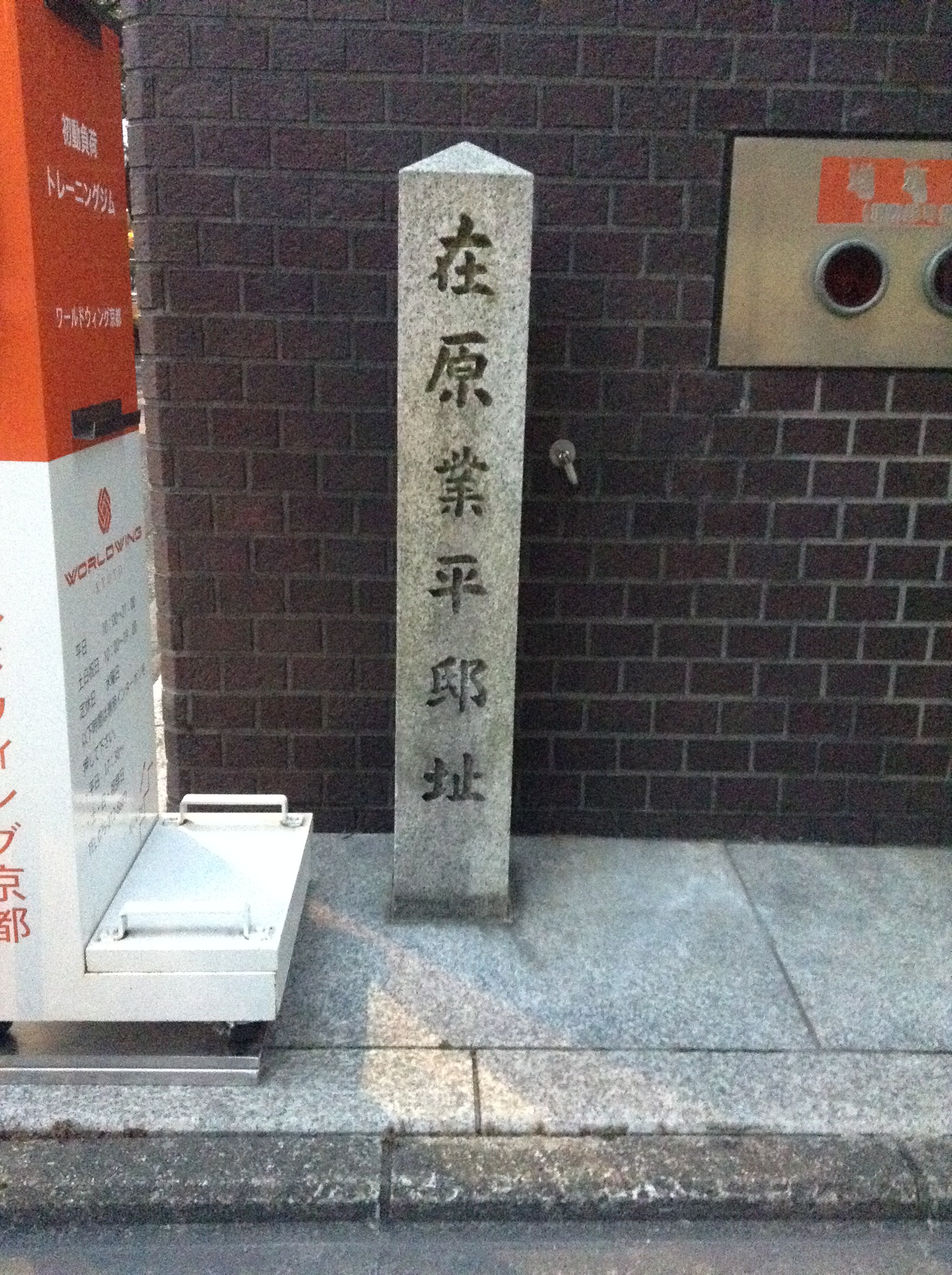
The reputed site of Narihira's residence, near Karasuma Oike Station

Although he is remembered mainly for his poetry, Narihira was of high birth and served at court. In 841 he was appointed Lieutenant of the Right Division of Inner Palace Guards, before being promoted to Lieutenant of the Left Division of Inner Palace Guards and then Chamberlain. In 849, (Note: Fukui lists Nariwara's age at this point as 25, according East Asian age reckoning.) he held the Junior Fifth Rank, Lower Grade.

Narihira rose to the positions of Provisional Assistant Master of the Left Military Guard, Assistant Chamberlain, Provisional Minor Captain of the Left Division of Inner Palace Guards, Captain of the Right Division of the Bureau of Horses, Provisional Middle Captain of the Right Division of Inner Palace Guards, Provisional Governor of Sagami, reaching the Junior Fourth Rank, Upper Grade. By the end of his life he had risen to Chamberlain and Provisional Governor of Mino.

Literary historian and critic Donald Keene observed in his description of Narihira as the protagonist of The Tales of Ise:

Narihira combined all the qualities most admired in a Heian courtier: he was of high birth (a grandson of the Emperor Heizei), extremely handsome, a gifted poet, and an all-conquering lover. He was probably also an expert horseman, adept in arms, and a competent official. These aspects of his life are not emphasized in The Tales of Ise, but they distinguish Narihira from other heroes of Heian literature, including Genji.

=== Romantic affairs ===
Narihira was known as a great lover; a third of his poems included in the Kokin Wakashū (Kokinshū) describe his various romantic affairs, and after his death the national history Nihon Sandai Jitsuroku (compiled 901) said of him: "Narihira was elegant and of handsome appearance, but he was unrestrained in his self-indulgence." (Note: 体貌閑麗。放縦不拘。)

The Tales of Ise portrays Narihira as falling in love with Fujiwara no Takaiko, a consort of Emperor Seiwa, and it is hinted that this was one of the reasons for his leaving the capital and travelling east. It has been speculated that this romantic affair with the consort of the emperor was the reason why the Sandai Jitsuroku describes his rank as going down from Junior Fifth Rank, Lower Grade to Senior Sixth Rank, Upper Grade, before again rising to Junior Fifth Rank, Upper Grade the following year. However, it has also been speculated that this may be an error in the Sandai Jitsuroku as a result of binding changing the order of events. Furthermore, Fujiwara no Takaiko reputedly had an affair with the monk Zen'yū (善祐), which may have formed the core of the otherwise fictional legend that she also had an affair with Narihira. Whether the affair was historical or not, the Reizei family's commentary on The Tales of Ise speculates that Emperor Yōzei was a product of this union, and not the previous emperor.

One of Narihira's most famous affairs—the one that gave The Tales of Ise its name—was said to be with Yasuko, high priestess of the Ise Grand Shrine and daughter of Emperor Montoku. The Tales of Ise describes the protagonist, presumed to be Narihira, visiting Ise on a hunt, and sleeping with the priestess. However, a passage in the Kokinshū describes the meeting ambiguously, in a manner that implies Narihira did not sleep with the priestess herself but rather another woman in her service. The 12th-century work Gōshidai (江次第) and the 13th-century work Kojidan claim that the product of this union was Takashina no Moronao (高階師尚), who was later adopted by Takashina no Shigenori (高階茂範). Japanologist Helen Craig McCullough stated there was "no evidence" the affair between Narihira and Yasuko was "more than a romantic myth".

A headnote to poems 784 and 785 in the Kokinshū connects Narihira to the daughter of Ki no Aritsune. (Note: Section 19 of the Tales of Ise recounts the same exchange of poems between the two, but does not explicitly name the poets.) Medieval commentaries call her Narihira's wife, and some modern scholars, such as Katagiri, do the same, although the only early source that explicitly names her is the note in the Kokinshū. In the classical Noh play Izutsu, an adaptation by Zeami Motokiyo of "Tsutsu-Izutsu" from The Tales of Ise, portrays Narihira and Ki no Aritsune's daughter as childhood playmates who eventually marry; Narihira is unfaithful to his wife, and her pining spirit appears to a monk after their deaths.

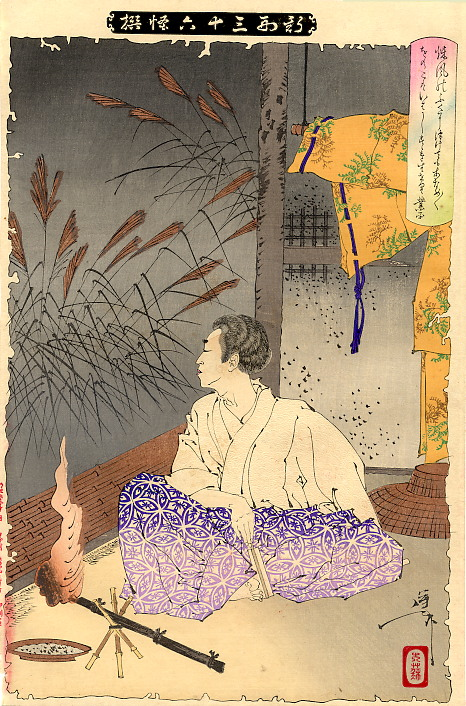
Ariwara no Narihira looking for the ghost of Ono no Komachi, in an 1891 print by Yoshitoshi

It has been speculated, based in part on their being considered the most beautiful man and woman of their age, that Narihira and the poet Ono no Komachi may have been lovers, but there is little evidence for this. Scholars of the 20th century such as Makane Sekitani (関谷真可禰, Sekitani Makane) have held up this speculation, which can be traced back at least as far as the 14th-century historian Kitabatake Chikafusa.

Chikafusa likely used Kamakura period Kokinshū commentaries such as the extant Bishamondō-bon Kokinshū-chū (毘沙門堂本古今集注), which speculates that one of Komachi's poems was left for Narihira after a tryst. The Bishamondō-bon Kokinshū-chū in turn likely worked from a then-common belief that fictional Tales of Ise was a genuine historical work detailing the actual events in Narihira's life (see above). Kamakura period commentaries on The Tales of Ise therefore tried to insert the names of real women where the original text simply said "a woman", and thus inserted Ono no Komachi into several passages of the text.

The literary scholar Yōichi Katagiri concluded, on the lack of surviving evidence, that, while it is possible that Narihira and Ono no Komachi knew each other and were lovers, there was no usable evidence to say conclusively either way.

=== Journey to the east ===
The Kokinshū, Tales of Ise and Tales of Yamato all describe Narihira leaving Kyoto to travel east through the Tōkaidō region and crossing the Sumida River, composing poems at famous places (see utamakura) along the way. The Tales of Ise implies this journey was the result of the scandalous affair between Narihira and Fujiwara no Takaiko. There are doubts as to whether this journey actually took place, from the point of view both that the number of surviving poems is quite small for having made such a trip and composing poems along the way, and in terms of the historical likelihood that a courtier could have gone wandering to the other end of the country with only one or two friends keeping him company.

=== Death ===
According to the Sandai Jitsuroku, Narihira died on 9 July 880 (the 28th day of the fifth month of Tenchō 6 on the Japanese calendar). Poem 861 in the Kokinshū, Narihira's last, expresses his shock and regret that his death should come so soon:

Japanese text

つひにゆく
道とはかねて
聞きしかど
昨日今日とは
思はざりしを

Romanized Japanese

tsui ni yuku
michi to wa kanete
kikishikado
kinō kyō to wa
omowazarishi wo

English translation

Long ago I heard
That this is the road we must all
Travel in the end,
But I never thought it might
Be yesterday or today.

=== Burial site ===
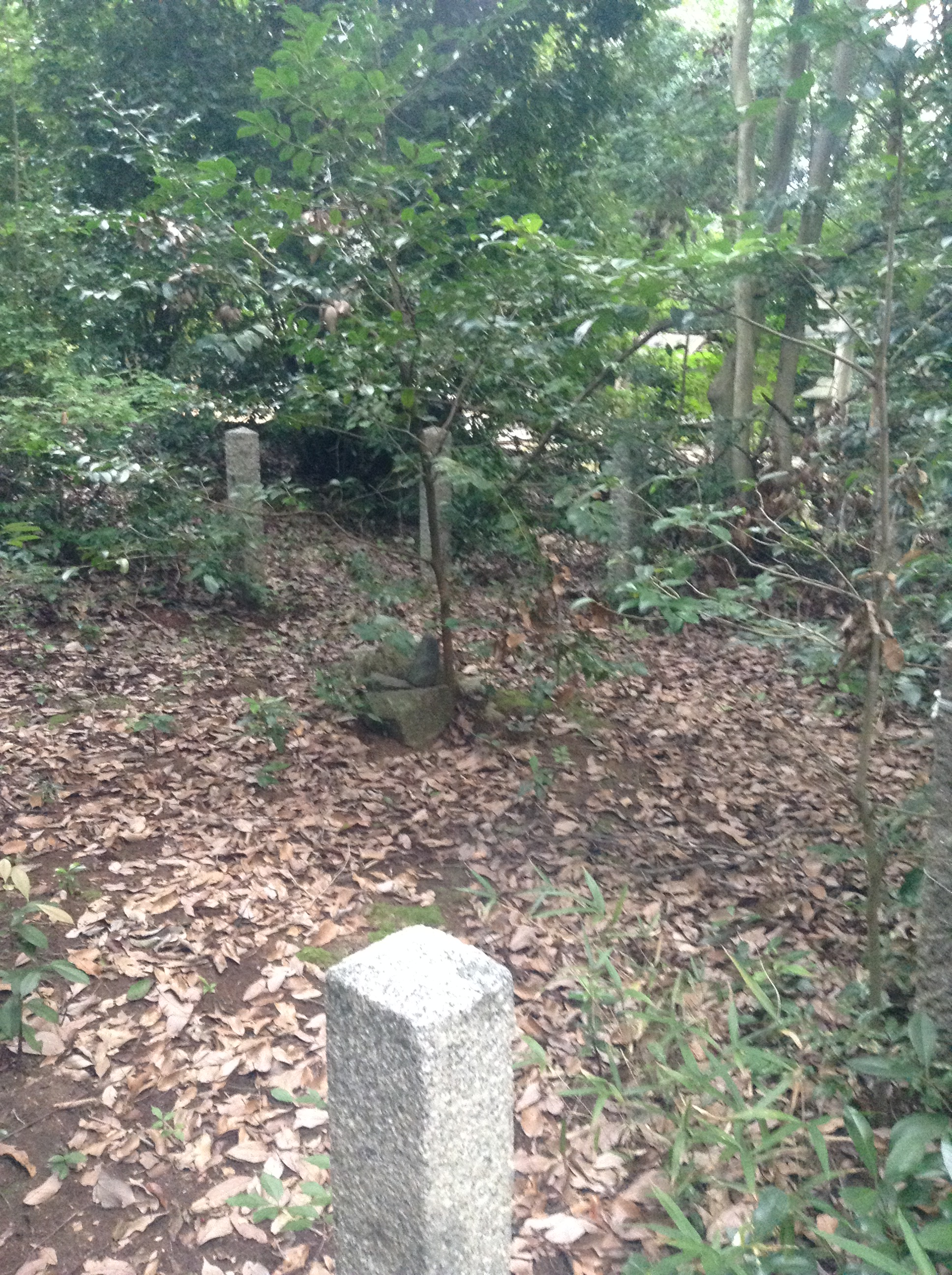
The Mount Yoshida grave site

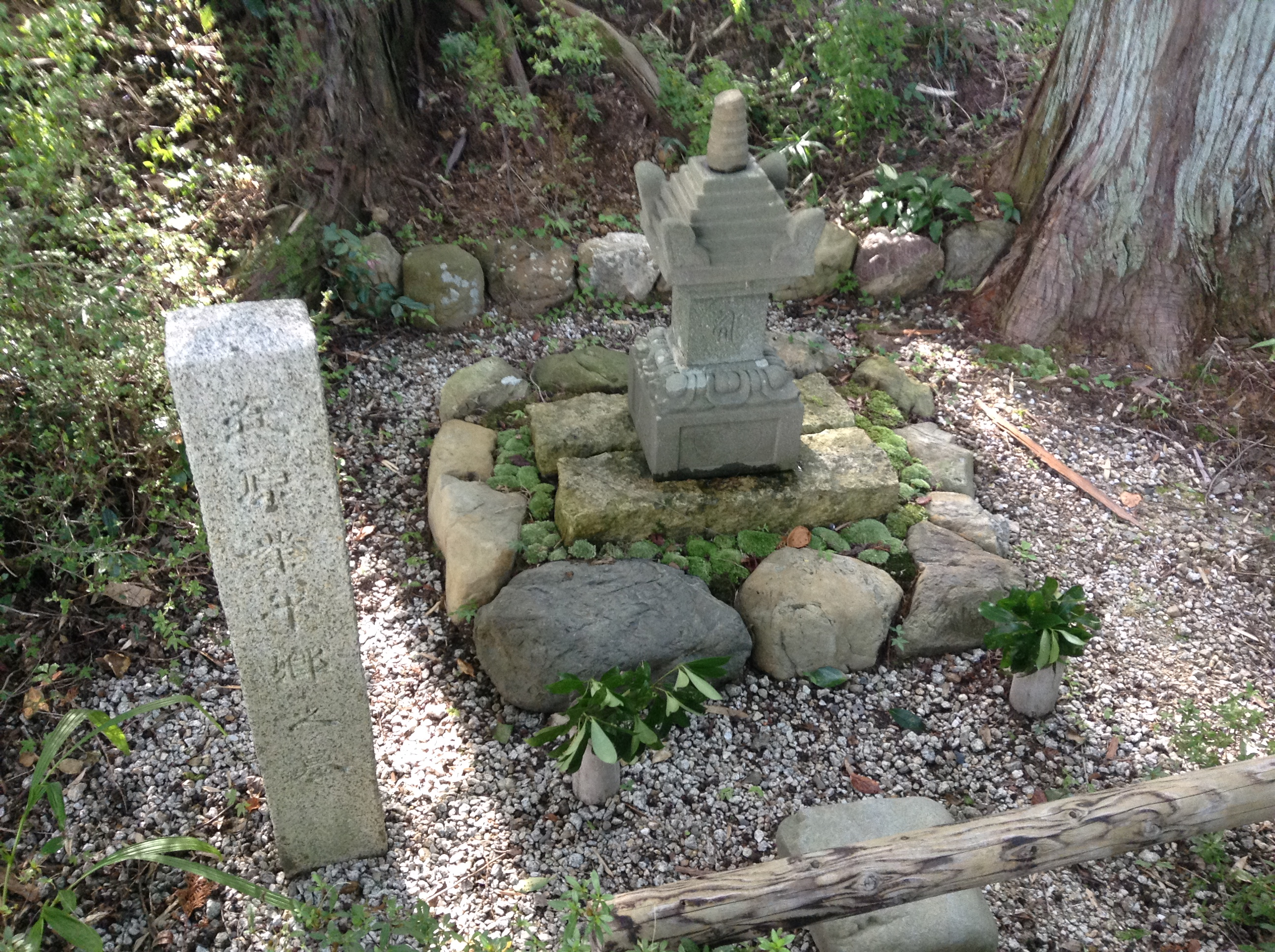
The Jūrin-ji grave site

The location of Narihira's grave is uncertain. In the Middle Ages he was considered a deity (kami) or even an avatar of the Buddha Dainichi, and so it is possible that some, that have been called graves of Narihira's, are in fact sacred sites consecrated to him rather than places where he was actually believed to have been buried. Kansai University professor and scholar of The Tales of Ise Tokurō Yamamoto (山本登朗, Yamamoto Tokurō) has speculated that the small stone grove on Mount Yoshida in eastern Kyoto known as "Narihira's burial mound" (業平塚, Narihira-zuka) may be such a site. He further speculated that the site became associated with Narihira because it was near the grave-site of Emperor Yōzei, who in the Middle Ages was widely believed to have secretly been fathered by Narihira. Another site traditionally believed to house Narihira's grave is Jūrin-ji (十輪寺) in western Kyoto, which is also known as "Narihira Temple" (なりひら寺, Narihira-dera).

=== Descendants ===
Among Narihira's children were the waka poets Muneyana (在原棟梁) and Shigeharu (在原滋春), and at least one daughter. Through Muneyama, he was also the grandfather of the poet Ariwara no Motokata. One of his granddaughters, whose name is not known, was married to Fujiwara no Kunitsune and engaged in a clandestine affair with Taira no Sadafun.

== Names ==
Narihira is also known by the nicknames Zai Go-Chūjō (在五中将), Zai Go (在五) and Zai Chūjō (在中将). Zai is the Sino-Japanese reading of the first character of his surname Ariwara, and Go, meaning "five", refers to him and his four brothers Yukihira, Nakahira, Morihira, and Ōe no Otondo. Chūjō ("Middle Captain") is a reference to the post he held near the end of his life, Provisional Middle Captain of the Right Division of Inner Palace Guards. After the recurring use of the phrase in The Tales of Ise, he is also known as Mukashi-Otoko (昔男).

== Poetry ==
Narihira left a private collection, the Narihira-shū (業平集), which was included in the Sanjūrokunin-shū (三十六人集). This was likely compiled by a later editor, after the compilation of the Gosen Wakashū in the mid-10th century.

Thirty poems attributed to Narihira were included in the early 10th-century Kokinshū, and many more in later anthologies, but the attributions are dubious. Ki no Tsurayuki mentioned Narihira in his kana preface to the Kokinshū as one of the Six Poetic Geniuses—important poets of an earlier age. He was also included in Fujiwara no Kintō's later Thirty-Six Poetic Geniuses.

Of the eleven poems the Gosen Wakashū attributed to Narihira, several were really by others—for example, two were actually by Fujiwara no Nakahira and one by Ōshikōchi no Mitsune. The Shin Kokinshū and later court anthologies attribute more poems to Narihira, but many of these were likely misunderstood to have been written by him because of their appearance in The Tales of Ise. Some of these were probably composed after Narihira's death. Combined, poems attributed to Narihira in court anthologies total 87.

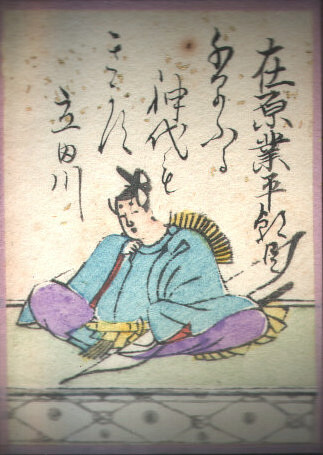
Ariwara no Narihira, from the Ogura Hyakunin Isshu

The following poem by Narihira was included as No. 17 in Fujiwara no Teika's Ogura Hyakunin Isshu:

Japanese text

ちはやぶる
神代も聞かず
竜田川
からくれなゐに
水くくるとは

Romanized Japanese

Chihayaburu
kami-yo mo kikazu
tatsuta-gawa
kara-kurenai ni
mizu kuguru to wa

English translation

Even the almighty
gods of old
never knew
such beauty:
on the river Tatsuta
in autumn sunlight
a brocade—
reds flowing above
blue water below.

As the karuta "name card" of the main character Chihaya Ayase, the poem appears frequently in the manga and anime Chihayafuru, and its history and meaning are discussed.

=== Characteristic style ===
Although at least some of the poems attributed to Narihira in imperial anthologies are dubious, there is a large enough body of his work contained in the relatively reliable Kokinshū for scholars to discuss Narihira's poetic style. Narihira made use of engo (related words) and kakekotoba (pivot words).

The following poem, number 618 in the Kokinshū, is cited by Keene as an example of Narihira's use of engo related to water:

Japanese text

つれづれの
ながめにまさる
涙河
そでのみぬれて
逢ふよしもなし

Romanized Japanese

tsurezure no
nagame ni masaru
namidagawa
sode nomi nurete
au yoshi mo nashi

English translation

Lost in idle brooding.
That swells with the long rains
A river of tears
That soaks only my sleeves:
There is no way to meet you.

The "water" engo are nagame ("brooding", but a pun on naga-ame "long rain"), namidagawa ("a river of tears") and nurete ("is soaked").

Narihira's poems are exceptionally ambiguous by Kokinshū standards, and so were treated by the anthology's compilers to relatively long headnotes. He was the only poet in the collection to receive this treatment. An example of Narihira's characteristic ambiguity that Keene cites is Kokinshū No. 747:

Japanese text

月やあらぬ
春や昔の
春ならぬ
わが身ひとつは
もとの身にして

Romanized Japanese

tsuki ya aranu
haru ya mukashi no
haru naranu
wa ga mi hitotsu wa
moto no mi ni shite

English translation

Is that not the moon?
And is the spring not the spring
Of a year ago?
This body of mine alone
Remains as it was before.

Scholars have subjected this poem, Narihira's most famous, to several conflicting interpretations in recent centuries. The Edo-period kokugaku scholar Motoori Norinaga interpreted the first part of it as a pair of rhetorical questions, marked by the particle ya. He explained away the logical inconsistency with the latter part of the poem that his reading introduced by reading in an "implied" conclusion that though the poet remains the same as before, everything somehow feels different. The late-Edo period waka poet Kagawa Kageki (香川景樹; 1768–1843) took a different view, interpreting the ya as exclamatory: the moon and spring are not those of before, and only the poet himself remains unchanged.

A similar problem of interpretation has also plagued Narihira's last poem (quoted above). The fourth line, kinō kyō to wa, is most normally read as "(I never thought) that it might be yesterday or today", but has been occasionally interpreted by scholars to mean "until yesterday I never thought it might be today"; others take it as simply meaning "right about now". But the emotion behind the poem is nonetheless clear: Narihira, who died in his fifties, always knew he must die someday, but is nonetheless shocked that his time has come so soon.

=== Reception ===
Tsurayuki's preface to the Kokinshū describes Narihira's poems as containing "too much feeling and insufficient words. They are like faded flowers whose colour has been lost but which retain a lingering fragrance". (Note: その心あまりて、ことばたらず。しぼめる花の色なくて、にほひ残れるごとし (sono kokoro amarite, kotoba tarazu. Shibomeru hana no iro nakute, nioi nokoreru gotoshi).) Ki no Yoshimochi repeats this in his Chinese preface to the Kokinshū, though according to literary scholars Rodd and Henkenius, it may not be negative criticism, and may even "be seen as complimentary". It likely refers to the subjective, emotional nature of his poetry; they say that "'insufficient' may suggest that many of his poems are misleading or unintelligible without explanatory headnotes", and perhaps indicates that "even though Narihira approached the art in an unconventional manner, his poetry succeeds".

Keene pointed out that this criticism likely reflected a change in literary tastes in the decades between Narihira's compositions and Tsurayuki's criticisms. His history of Japanese literature, Seeds in the Heart concluded its discussion of Narihira with the following:

Narihira was not a profound poet. His surviving poems are mainly occasional, and even when the expression suggests deeply felt emotion, its worldly manner keeps his poetry from attaining the grandeur of the best Man'yōshū poems in the same vein. He is nevertheless of historical importance as one who maintained the traditions of the waka during the long night of the dominance of poetry in Chinese.

Poet and translator Peter McMillan says the large number of Narihira's poems included in the Kokinshū and later court anthologies is an indicator of the high regard in which his poetry was held.

== Connection to The Tales of Ise ==
The Tales of Ise is a collection of narrative episodes, centred on Narihira, and presenting poems he had composed, along with narratives explaining what had inspired the poems.

Narihira was once widely considered the author of the work, but scholars have come to reject this attribution. Keene speculates that it is at least possible that Narihira originally composed the work from his and others' poems as a kind of inventive autobiography, and some later author came across his manuscript after his death and expanded on it. The protagonist of the work was likely modelled on him. The work itself was likely put together in something resembling its present form by the middle of 10th century, and took several decades starting with Narihira's death.

Three stages have been identified in the composition of the work. The first of these stages would have been based primarily on poems actually composed by Narihira, although the background details provided were not necessarily historical. The second saw poems added to the first layer that were not necessarily by Narihira, and had a higher proportion of fiction to fact. The third and final stage saw some later author adding the use of Narihira's name, and treating him as a legendary figure of the past.

The late 11th-century Tale of Sagoromo refers to Ise by the variant name Zaigo Chūjō no Nikki ("Narihira's diary").

== Influence on later Japanese culture ==
In later centuries Narihira has been considered the epitome of the amorous bel homme, and his romantic escapades have given rise to many later legends. He and his contemporary Ono no Komachi were considered the archetypes of the beautiful man and woman of the Heian court, and appear as such in many later literary works, particularly in Noh theatre.

It is believed Narihira was one of the men who inspired Murasaki Shikibu when she created Hikaru Genji, the protagonist of The Tale of Genji. Genji makes allusion to The Tales of Ise and draws parallels between their respective protagonists. Though not directly stated in the text, later commentators have interpreted The Tales of Ise as implying that Narihira's illicit union with the empress Fujiwara no Takaiko made him the true father of Emperor Yōzei; whether Murasaki interpreted the work this way is uncertain, but The Tale of Genji describes a very similar incident in which the protagonist, a former imperial prince made a commoner, has an affair with an empress and sires a son who ultimately becomes emperor as his true parentage is kept secret. Narihira appears in tales such as 35 and 36 of Book 24 of the late Heian-period Konjaku Monogatarishū.

Along with his contemporary Ono no Komachi and the protagonist of The Tale of Genji, Narihira figured prominently in Edo-period ukiyo-e prints and was alluded to in the ukiyo-zōshi of Ihara Saikaku.

The 16th-century warrior Ōtomo Yoshiaki used Narihira and the courtly world of The Tales of Ise as an ironic reference in a poem he composed about the severed head of his defeated enemy Tachibana Nagatoshi (立花 長俊), the lord of Tachibana Castle in Chikuzen Province, whom he killed 10 March 1550.

Japanese text

立花は
昔男と
なりにけり
うひかぶりする
心地こそすれ

Romanized Japanese

Tachibana wa
mukashi otoko to
narinikeri
uikaburi suru
kokochi koso sure

English translation

Tachibana has
Now been transformed into
A man of long ago.
He must feel as if he had
First put on an adult's hat.

== Gallery ==
Ariwara no Narihira image gallery

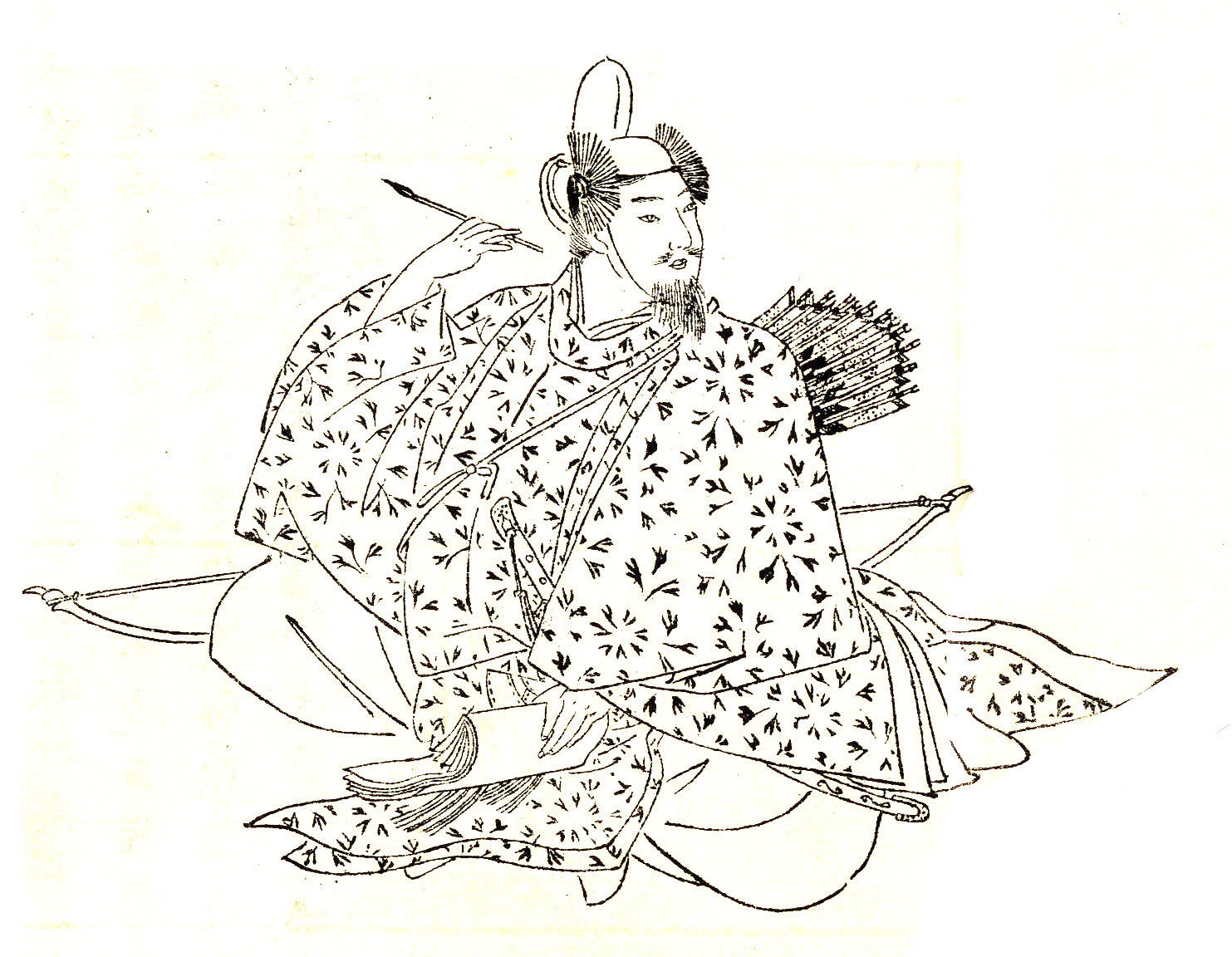
Drawing of Narihira by Kikuchi Yōsai.

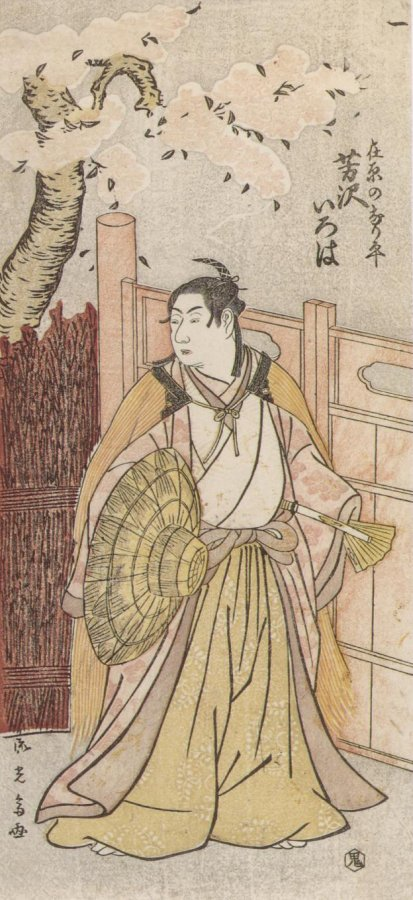
Woodblock print by Ryūkōsai Jokei of kabuki actor Yoshizawa Iroha I portraying Narihira

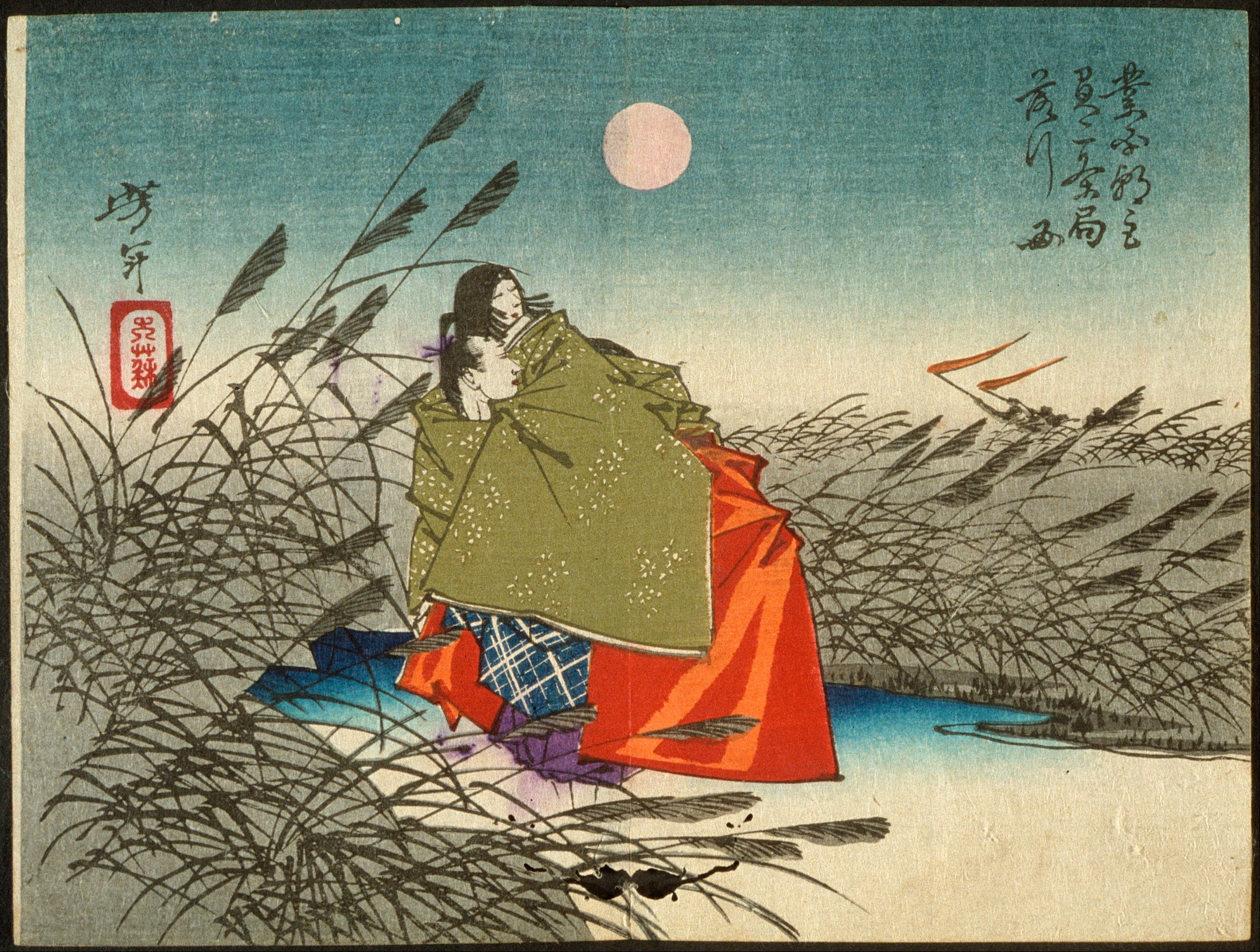
Narihira and Nijō no Tsubone at the Fuji River, woodblock print by Yoshitoshi, 1882

== Works cited ==
- Arikawa, Mikio (1983). "Komachi Sōshi". Nihon Koten Bungaku Daijiten 日本古典文学大辞典 (in Japanese). Vol. 2. Tokyo: Iwanami Shoten. p. 665. OCLC 11917421.
- Brazell, Karen; Araki, James T. (1998). Traditional Japanese Theater: An Anthology of Plays. Columbia University Press. ISBN 978-0-231-10873-7.
- "Ariwara no Narihira" 在原業平. Britannica Kokusai Dai-Hyakkajiten (in Japanese). Encyclopædia Britannica, Inc. 2014. Archived from the original on 4 March 2016.
- "Ariwara no Narihira" 在原業平. Daijisen (in Japanese). Shogakukan. 1998.
- "Mukashi-Otoko" 昔男. Daijisen (in Japanese). Shogakukan. 1998.
- Fukui, Teisuke (1983). "Ariwara no Narihira". Nihon Koten Bungaku Daijiten 日本古典文学大辞典 (in Japanese). Vol. 1. Tokyo: Iwanami Shoten. pp. 99–100. OCLC 11917421.
- Katagiri, Yōichi (2005). Kokin Wakashū (in Japanese). Tokyo: Kasama Shoin. ISBN 978-4-305-70417-7.
- Katagiri, Yōichi (2015). Shinsō-ban: Ono no Komachi Tsuiseki 新装版 小野小町追跡 (in Japanese). Tokyo: Kasama Shoin. ISBN 978-4-305-70781-9.
- Keene, Donald (1999) [1993]. A History of Japanese Literature, Vol. 1: Seeds in the Heart – Japanese Literature from Earliest Times to the Late Sixteenth Century (paperback ed.). New York, NY: Columbia University Press. ISBN 978-0-231-11441-7.
- Kido, Kuniko (2000). "Ise Monogatari kochū in okeru Ki no Aritsune no musume" 『伊勢物語』古注における紀有常の娘. Mie Daigaku Nihongo-gaku Bungaku (in Japanese). 11 (11). Mie University: 23–32. hdl:10076/6556.
- McCullough, Helen Craig (1968). Tales of Ise: Lyrical Episodes from 10th Century Japan. Stanford University Press. ISBN 0-8047-0653-0.
- Mabuchi Kazuo, Kunisaki Fumimaro, Inagaki Taiichi. 2001 (6th ed. 2006). Konjaku Monogatarishū (3) in Shinpen Nihon Koten Bungaku Zenshū series . Tokyo: Shogakukan.
- McMillan, Peter (2010). One Hundred Poets, One Poem Each. New York: Columbia University Press.
- Kawada, Jun (1943). Sengoku jidai wakashū 戰國時代和歌集 [Sengoku period waka anthology] (in Japanese). Kōchō Shorin. OCLC 40506247.
- Nishishita, Kyōichi; Sanekata, Kiyoshi, eds. (1977) [1960]. Zōho Kokugo Kokubungaku Kenkyū-shi Taisei 7: Kokinshū, Shinkokinshū (revised ed.). Tokyo: Sanseidō. ISBN 978-4-385-34422-5.
- Nishizawa, Masashi, ed. (2002). Koten Bungaku o Yomu tame no Yōgo-Jiten 古典文学を読むための用語辞典 [Terminological Dictionary for Reading Classical Japanese Literature] (in Japanese). Tokyo: Tōkyō-dō Shuppan. ISBN 978-4-490-10600-8.
- Makino, Osamu (2007). Kettei-han Kyōto no jisha 5050 wo aruku. Ge (rakusei, rakuhoku (seiiki), rakunan, rakugai hen) [決定版] 京都の寺社505を歩く. 下(洛西・洛北(西域)・洛南・洛外編) (in Japanese). PHP Kenkyūsho. ISBN 978-4-569-69248-7.
- "Ariwara no Narihira" 在原業平. My Pedia (in Japanese). Hitachi. 1996.
- Okada, Richard H. (1991). Figures of Resistance: Language, Poetry, and Narrating in The Tale of the Genji and Other Mid-Heian Texts. Duke University Press. ISBN 0-8223-1192-5.
- Rodd, Laurel Rasplica; Henkenius, Mary Catherine, eds. (1984). Kokinshū: A Collection of Poems Ancient and Modern. University of Tokyo Press. ISBN 978-4-13-087048-1.
- Schalow, Paul Gordon (2007). A Poetics of Courtly Male Friendship in Heian Japan. Honolulu: University of Hawai'i Press. ISBN 9780824861285 – via Project MUSE.
- Shirane, Haruo (2008). Early Modern Japanese Literature: An Anthology, 1600–1900, Abridged. New York: Columbia University Press. ISBN 978-0-231-14415-5.
- Suzuki, Hideo; Yamaguchi, Shin'ichi; Yoda, Yasushi (2005) [1997]. Genshoku: Ogura Hyakunin Isshu 原色小倉百人一首. Shiguma Besuto. Tokyo: Bun'eidō. ISBN 978-4-578-10082-9.
- Videen, Susan Downing (1989). Tales of Heichū. Harvard University Asia Center. ISBN 978-0-674-38715-7.
- Yamamoto, Tokurō (June 2003). "Yoshida-yama no Narihira-zuka" 吉田山の業平塚 (PDF). Reki (in Japanese): 27–30. Archived from the original (PDF) on 9 May 2016 – via Kansai University.
