= Prince Abo =

Japanese imperial prince (792–842)

Prince Abo 阿保親王
- Prince Abo
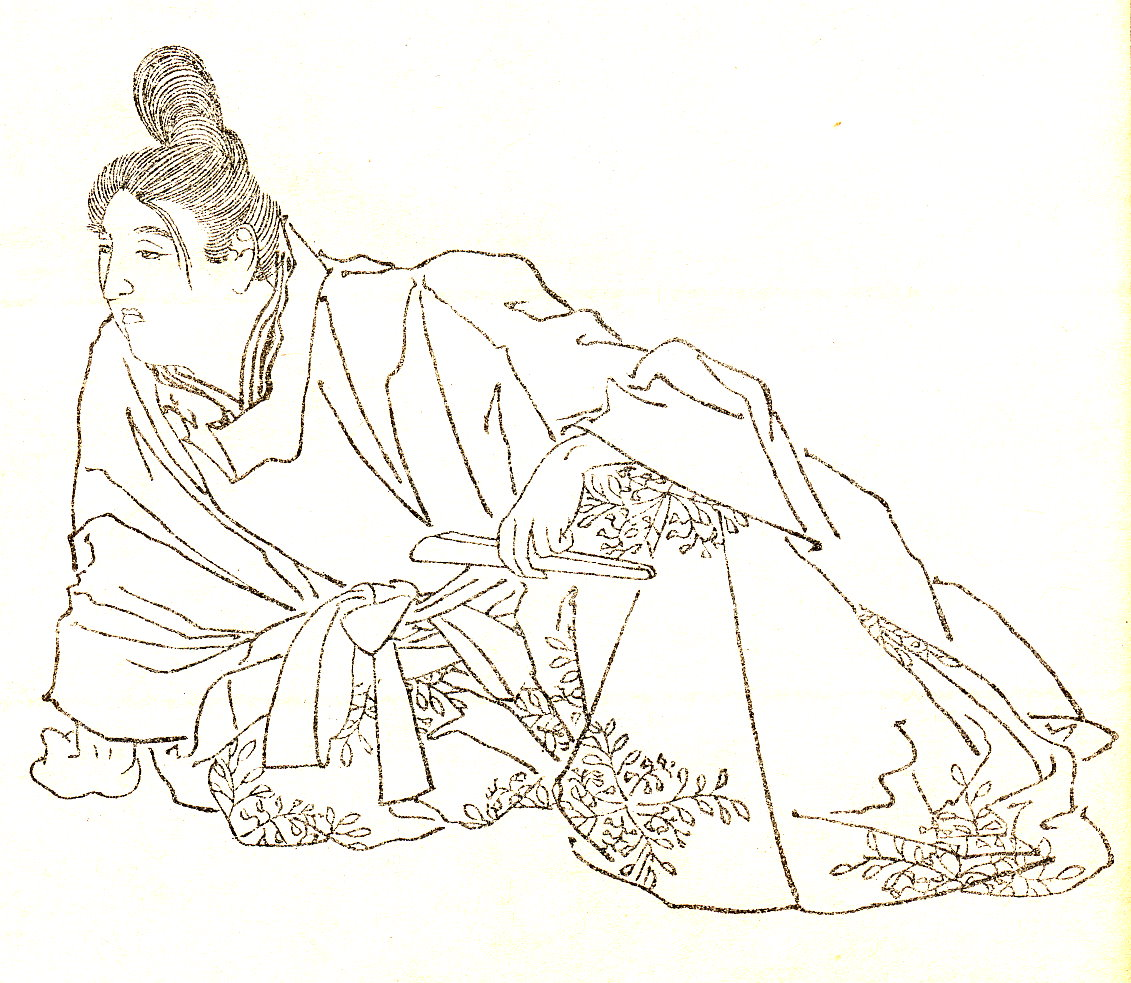
- Drawing of Prince Abo by Kikuchi Yōsai
- Born: 792; Kyoto
- Died: 22 October 842; Kyoto
- Issue: Ariwara no Yukihira; Ariwara no Narihira; Ariwara no Morihira; Ariwara no Nakahira; Ōe no Otondo
Names
- Abo (阿保)
- House: Imperial House of Japan
- Father: Emperor Heizei
- Mother: Fujii no Fujiko

Prince Abo (阿保親王, Abo-shinnō; 792–842) was a Japanese imperial prince of the early Heian period.

== Biography ==
He was born in 792 in Kyoto. His parents were Emperor Heizei and Fujii no Fujiko.

Following the Kusuko Incident (薬子の変, Kusuko no hen) of 810, in which he was complicit, he was exiled to Dazaifu in modern Fukuoka Prefecture, where he was made Deputy Governor of Dazaifu (太宰権帥, Dazai no gon no sochi). In 824, at the beginning of the Tenchō era, he received a pardon and was allowed return to the Capital.

In 826, his sons Yukihira, Narihira-both prominent poets- Morihira (守平) and Nakahira (仲平) were given the surname Ariwara. Among his other children was the scholar and poet Ōe no Otondo (大江音人; 811–877).

The Jōwa Incident (承和の変, Jōwa no hen), an 842 rebellion plot, was uncovered thanks to an anonymous report by Prince Abo. He died in the same year, on the twenty-second day of the tenth month.

== Genealogy ==
His father was Emperor Heizei and his mother was a court lady Fujii no Fujiko/Tōshi, Fujii no Michiyori's daughter

- Wife: Imperial Princess Ito (伊都内親王), eighth daughter of Emperor Kanmu
  - Third son: Ariwara no Yukihira (在原 行平, 818 – 6 September 893)
  - Fifth son: Ariwara no Narihira (在原業平, 825 – 9 July 890)
- Unknown concubine
  - Eldest son: Prince Kanemi (兼見王)
  - Second son: Ariwara no Nakahira (在原仲平)
  - Fourth son: Ariwara no Morihei (在原守平)
  - Sixth son: Gyokei (行慶)
  - First daughter: Wife of Minamoto no Hiromu (源弘), son of Emperor Saga
  - Second daughter: Unknown
