= The Tales of Ise =

Japanese collection of waka poems

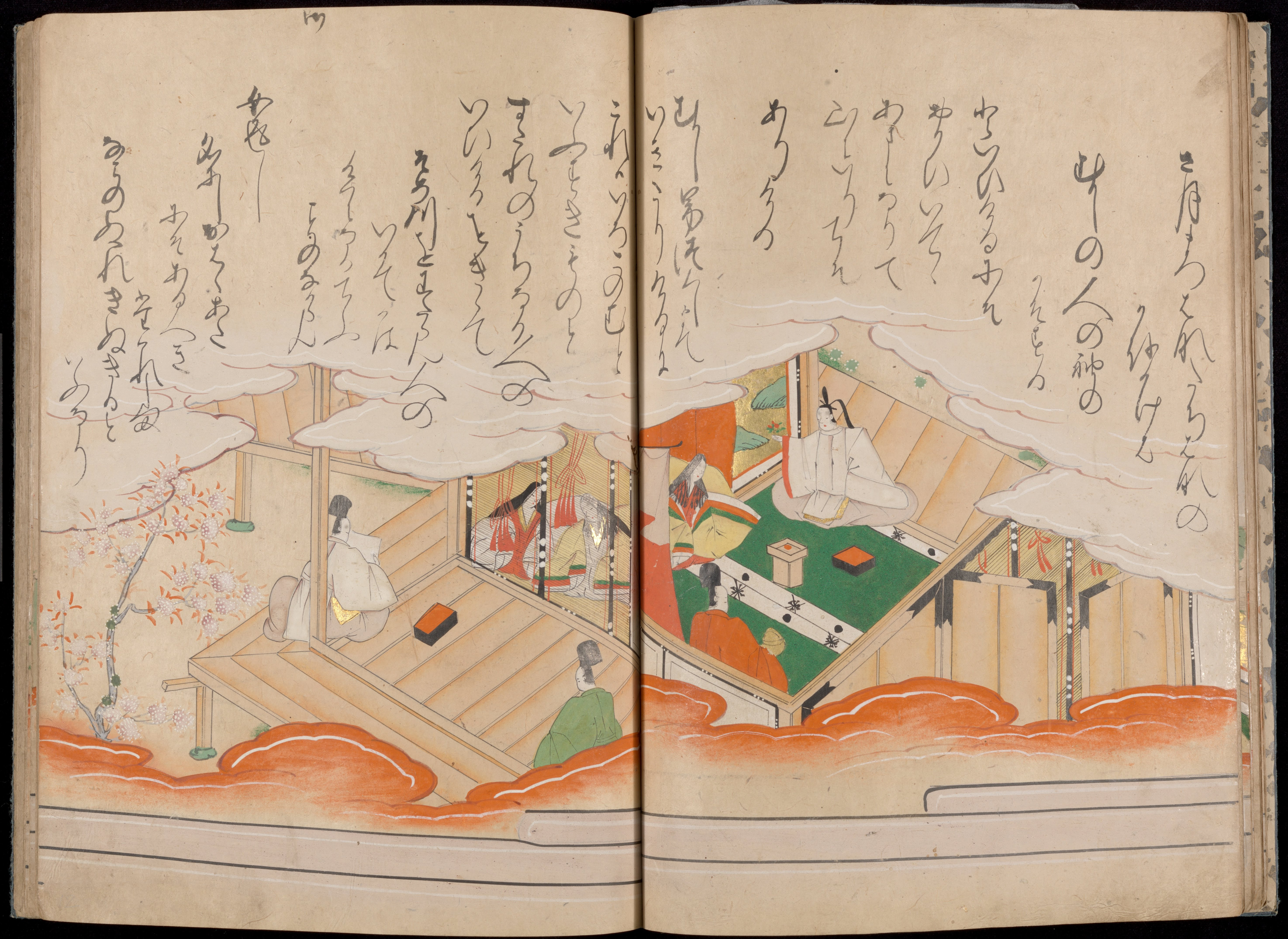
Double-page from the manuscript of The Tales of Ise. Japan, late 16th century. Chester Beatty Library

The Tales of Ise (伊勢物語, Ise monogatari) is a Japanese uta monogatari, or collection of waka poems and associated narratives, dating from the Heian period. The standard versions have 125 sections or episodes each combining poems and prose, with a total of 209 poems. The work has had decisive impact on later Japanese literature, and it is indeed considered (together with Kokin wakashū and Genji Monogatari) as one of the three fundamental works of the Heian period — if not of all of pre-modern Japanese literary history.

Concerning the exact date of composition and authorship there is only unresolved speculation. The identity of the nameless, idealised central character is unclear, though it is suggested to be Ariwara no Narihira (825–880). Thirty of the poems from The Tales of Ise appear in the Kokin Wakashū (905), with similar headnotes, all attributed to Narihira. The combination of these poems, and the similarity of some events in the tales to Narihira's life, have led to the additional suggestion that Narihira actually composed the work; however, the inclusion of material and events dating after 880 suggests otherwise.

== Title ==
The late-eleventh century work known as The Tale of Sagoromo refers to Ise by the variant name Zaigo Chūjō no Nikki (在五中将の日記; "Narihira's diary").

== Authorship ==
Theories vary on the author's identity, with some suggesting it began as an autobiographical work by Ariwara no Narihira, and others speculating that stylistic similarities to passages in the Kokin Wakashū point to Ki no Tsurayuki as the author. Others have, based on the title of the work, guessed that it may have been composed by the poet Lady Ise, but this is generally taken as unlikely, as none of the other known works of this period use the names of their authors as their principal titles.

== Origin and structure ==
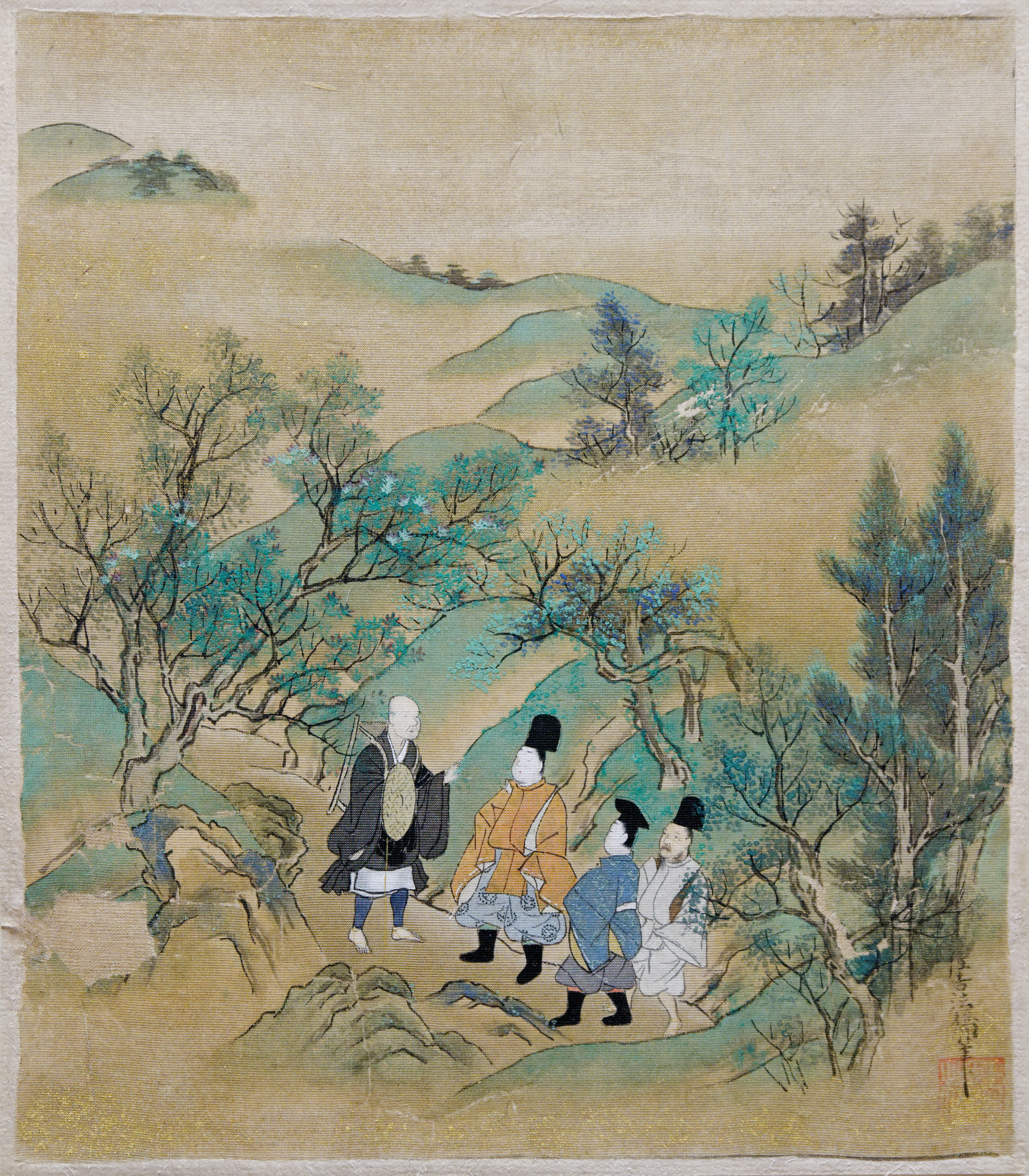
Painting by Sumiyoshi Jokei (住吉如慶) illustrating episode 9 of the Tales of Ise, British Museum

The Tales of Ise may have developed from specific poetry sets, but with accretions of later narratives intended to ground the poems in a specific historical time and place and to develop an overall theme. Kashu, private or individual poetry collections, provide a journal of selected works, with headnotes covering the circumstances of the composition; it is possible Narihira may have created such a collection, which was subsequently adapted to portray an idealised vision of the poet. Volume 16 of the Man'yōshū also contains a large selection of poems preceded by narratives in Classical Chinese, like the narrative style of the Tales of Ise.

The narrative makes little attempt to link the sections, but instead introduces or provides a scene for the poem's composition. A rough chronology of the central character's life is established through the sections, from the 'young man who came of age' in section 1, through numerous adventures and loves, to the man who fell gravely ill and 'knew in his heart that he was to die', in section 125. This neither produces a traditional biography nor even a traditional plot as seen from a Western perspective.

At least four theories for the title of the work have been proposed by commentators from the Kamakura period onwards: the work was written by Lady Ise and named after her; the title followed from section 69, as the central character visits the Saiō (high priestess of Ise Shrine); in the Nihon Shoki, the character for I reads as woman, and Se reads as man, leading to the text embodying the theme of union; the author deliberately distorted events, places, people, and times, embodying the phrase Ise ya Hyuga or 'topsy-turvy'.

Thematically, The Tales of Ise embodies the courtly miyabi aesthetic prevalent in the surviving works produced by and for the culture elite of the Heian period, such as the better-known The Tale of Genji. The poems themselves explore nature, the court society, culture, and love and relationships. A highlight can be seen in the interlude in section 9, as the central character rests beside the yatsuhashi 'eight bridges' in the famous Japanese iris marshes of Mikawa Province. The poem he composes combines these themes: the sense of loss at leaving the capital, viewed as the only place of society and culture; longing for lost loves; and the beauty of the natural environment.

から衣 きつゝなれにし つましあれば はるばるきぬる たびをしぞ思ふ
Karagoromo / kitsutsu narenishi / tsuma shi areba / harubaru kinuru / tabi o shi zo omou
I have a beloved wife / familiar as the skirt / of a well-worn robe / and so this distant journeying / fills my heart with grief

Although this is a direct translation, the meaning behind the words is more complex. In this excerpt, the author compares his wife, whom he misses while travelling, to a well-worn piece of clothing. Meaning that as you wear something for a long time, it becomes part of you and fits perfectly. So the author feels this exact way about his wife: she fits him perfectly, and he misses her profoundly.

There are additional meanings behind this phrase as well, which the author fully intended the reader to understand. The first is when the first Japanese character of each line is taken out and lined up in order:

かきつはた
kakitsuhata
Iris

The second is when the last Japanese character of each line is taken out and lined up in reverse:

うるはしも
uruwashimo
Old Japanese 'beautiful'

== Folding screens ==
Tales of Ise folding screen by Matabei School c1625 part 1

Tales of Ise folding screen by Matabei School c1650 part 2

== See also ==
- Japanese poetry
- The Tale of Genji
- The Tale of the Bamboo Cutter
- Tsutsu-Izutsu
- Rinpa school

== Bibliography ==
- Richard Bowring, 'The Ise monogatari: A short cultural history', Harvard Journal of Asiatic Studies, vol. 52, no. 2 (December 1992), pp. 401–480.
- H. Jay Harris (translator), The Tales of Ise, North Clarendon: Tuttle Publishing, 1972. ISBN 0-8048-3338-9.
- Keene, Donald (1999). A History of Japanese Literature, Vol. 1: Seeds in the Heart — Japanese Literature from Earliest Times to the Late Sixteenth Century. New York: Columbia University Press. ISBN 978-0-231-11441-7.
- Helen Craig McCullough (translator), Tales of Ise: Lyrical Episodes from Tenth-Century Japan, Stanford: Stanford University Press, 1968. ISBN 0-8047-0653-0.
- Peter MacMillan (translator), Tales of Ise. London: Penguin Classics, 2016. ISBN 978-0-14-139257-8.
- Joshua Mostow, Tokurō Yamamoto and Kurtis Hanlon (eds.), An Ise Monogatari Reader. Leiden, Boston: Brill, 2021. ISBN 978-90-04-44762-2.
