= Princess Ito =

Japanese princess (died 861)

Princess Ito 伊都内親王
- Princess Ito
- Died: 861; Kyoto
- Spouse: Prince Abo
- Issue: Ariwara no Yukihira; Ariwara no Narihira
Names
- Ito (伊都)
- House: Imperial House of Japan
- Father: Emperor Kanmu

Princess Ito (伊都内親王 or 伊登内親王, Ito-naishinnō; d. 861) was a Japanese imperial princess of the early Heian period.

== Biography ==
Ito's exact date of birth is unknown. Her father was Emperor Kanmu. She became the wife of Prince Abo, and the mother of the waka poets Narihira and possibly Ariwara no Yukihira.

The Kōfuku-ji in Nara houses a document, the Ito-naishinnō Ganmon, which records her donation of incense and sutras to the temple, and is dated to 833.

She died in Kyoto, in 861.
