= Ariwara no Motokata =

Japanese poet

- 在原元方
- Relatives: Emperor Heizei (great-great grandfather), Fujii no Fujiko (great-great grandmother), Emperor Kanmu (great-great grandfather), Fujiwara no Minamiko (great-great grandmother), Prince Abo (great grandfather), Princess Ito (great grandmother), Ariwara no Narihira (paternal grandfather), Ariwara no Muneyana (father)
- Writing career
- Language: Japanese
- Period: early Heian
- Genre: waka

Ariwara no Motokata (在原元方; dates unknown, fl. late 800s – 900s CE) was a Japanese waka poet of the early Heian period.

He was included in the Late Classical Thirty-Six Poetic Geniuses, and thirty-three of his poems were included in poetry collections commissioned by the court.

== Biography ==
His birth and death dates are unknown, and the details of his life are also uncertain, but he was the son of Ariwara no Muneyana (died 898), the first son of Ariwara no Narihira (825—880). Who his mother was is also unknown.

According to the Kokin Wakashū Mokuroku (古今和歌集目録), he was adopted by his brother-in-law Fujiwara no Kunitsune (藤原国経).

As a courtier, he held the Senior Fifth Rank, although the 14th century Chokusen Sakusha Burui (勅撰作者部類) attributes to him the Sixth Rank.

== Poetry ==
He was listed as one of the Late Classical Thirty-Six Poetic Geniuses. Thirty-three of his poems were included in court anthologies: fourteen the Kokin Wakashū, eight in the Gosen Wakashū, two in the Shūi Wakashū, and nine more in later anthologies from the Shin Kokin Wakashū on.

The following poem was included as the very first entry in the Kokin Wakashū, indicating the high regard in which the compilers likely held his poetry.

Japanese text

年のうちに
春は来にけり
一年を
去年とやいはむ
今年とやいはむ

Romanized Japanese

toshi no uchi ni
haru wa ki ni keri
hitotose o
kozo to ya iwan
kotoshi to ya iwan

English translation

During the old year
spring has come.
The day that is left:
should we call it last year
or should we call it this year?

Between one and three of his poems survive in the records of each of several uta-awase gatherings: the Ninna Ninomiya Uta-awase (仁和二宮歌合; 893 or earlier), the Kanpyō no Oontoki Kisai no Miya no Uta-awase (寛平御時后宮歌合; also written 寛平御時中宮歌合; 893 or earlier), the Teiji-in no Uta-awase (亭子院歌合; 913) and the Taira no Sadafun ga Ie no Uta-Awase (平定文家歌合; also read Taira no Sadafumi-ke Uta-Awase). Some of these overlap with the Motokata poems preserved in court anthologies.

In the middle ages there was apparently a private collection of his poems, the Motokata-kashū (元方家集), but only a four-leaf fragment is known to exist today.

=== Characteristic style ===
His poems are characterized by an intellectual style. They make frequent use of simile (見立て, mitate).

His poems clearly display the features of the so-called "Kokinshū style".
