= Izutsu =

井筒
- English title: The Well Cradle (wooden frame around well)
- Written by: Zeami Motokiyo
- Category: 3rd — katsura mono
- Mood: mugen
- Characters: shite daughter of Ki no Aritsune waki priest aikyōgen villager
- Place: Ariwara Temple, Nara
- Time: Autumn
- Sources: Ise monogatari

Izutsu (井筒, The Well Cradle) is a classic Noh play written by Zeami, the dominant figure in the early history of Noh theatre.

Izutsu is based on an old story, Tsutsu-Izutsu (筒井筒), from the Ise monogatari, a 10th-century collection of stories, many of which are based on stories about the romantic encounters of a "certain man", traditionally identified as the poet Ariwara no Narihira.

== Tsutsu-Izutsu ==
A boy and a girl knew each other from early childhood. They were good friends and one of their games was to see who was taller by measuring each other against the local well. As they grew older, they began to feel more self-conscious in each other's company and they drifted apart, although they continued to love each other.

The girl's parents offered to find her a husband, but she declined as she still had feelings for the boy.

The boy eventually composes a tanka:

筒井筒 井筒にかけし まろがたけ 生いにけらしな 妹見ざる間に
The wooden frame [of the well]... I was shorter than the frame [when we last compared our heights], but I have outgrown it in your absence.

The girl replies:

くらべこし ふりわけ髪も 肩過ぎぬ 君ならずして 誰かあぐべき
We compared the lengths of our hair also, but my hair has grown past my shoulders. If not you, who will be there to tie it up for me?

So it was that they were married.

However, the man later fell in love with another woman, who lived behind Mount Tatsuta and he took to making visits to this woman's house. After many visits, the affair could no longer be kept a secret; but his wife made no protest. He concluded that his wife had herself fallen in love with another man.

One stormy night, he was just setting out on one of these visits, when he decided to turn back to find out the identity of his wife's lover. Peeping into the house, he saw that his wife was all alone. Unaware that he was watching, she was applying her make-up and composing a tanka:

風吹けば おきつ白波 龍田山 夜半にや君が 一人越ゆらん
The sea near Mount Tatsuta becomes rough when the wind is so gusty. That my husband should be climbing Tatsuta on such a stormy night! [I'm anxious about my husband.]

He realised then how much he was loved and never went back to the other woman.

== Izutsu ==
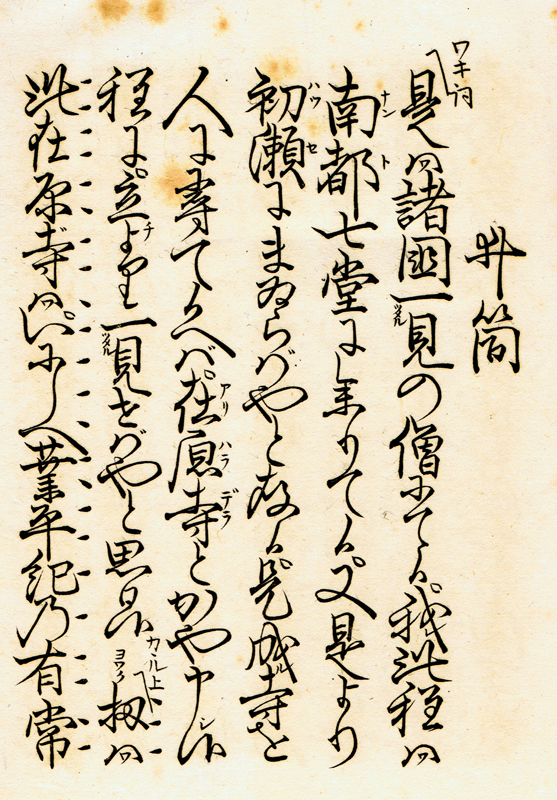
The song book of Izutsu, Kanze school.

A priest is visiting the famous temples of Nara. On his way to Hatsuse, he stops at Ariwara Temple and recognises the locale as Isonokami, where Narihira and Ki no Aritsune's daughter lived long ago.

A village woman arrives to tend a grave in the garden. She draws offertory water from a wooden-framed well and, as he watches her, the priest becomes intrigued. He asks her why she is tending the grave and she says there is a story behind the place. She begins to tell the story Tsutsu-Izutsu from the Ise Monogatari.

When she has finished the story, the village woman looks at the priest and says she is the wife in the old 10th century story. She disappears. He has seen her ghost. The priest asks a village man about the place and hears the story more plainly. The villager suggests that, as a priest, he could offer a prayer to her soul. So he decides to settle down for the night on a bed of moss in the garden. She comes to him again in a dream. This time she is wearing her husband's cap and gown over her kimono. She dances and sings about how much she loves her husband and how much she yearns for him. She looks into the well that they had stood beside as children and sees his reflection. She then cries and disappears.
