= Kojidan =

The text is six volumes in length and contains 462 setsuwa stories many of which focus on monks, the aristocracy, and the imperial palace. It was extremely popular and influenced a number of following collections beginning with the 1219 text Zoku Kojidan and Uji Shūi Monogatari.

The Kojidan is the source of words still used in modern Japanese including 別荘 (bessō), a summer house.

== Contents ==
One setsuwa included in the Kojidan was of a woman who committed adultery with the bishop (sōjō (僧正) Ninkai and gave birth to a boy. Out of fear that the relationship with Ninkai would be discovered, the mother let the infant drink mercury, thinking that if the child survived, he would not be able to have sexual intercourse, which was forbidden to monks. The story illustrated that while the mother's behavior was unacceptable, Ninkai, who was at the highest rank of official monk, was guilty of breaking a precept of Buddhism. The episode notes that as an adult, the son, Jōson, who also became a monk, did not have sexual relations with either men or women. Japanese historian Kenji Matsuo suggests that this was noted because homosexual relationships were common in monk communities.

Another account describes a woman known as the Gion Consort, the daughter of Gion-no-Shōnin Hōshi, who became the consort of Emperor Go-Shirakawa as a reward for her virtue after she was sent by her father to bring offerings to Ninkai as he worshipped Dakiniten for one thousand days at Mount Inari. In the Kojidan, the Gion Consort was described as such an extraordinary lover of meat that she sent out people to hunt every day so she could have fresh meat, at a time when the former emperor was rigorously following the Buddhist precepts against the taking of a life.

The Kojidan also contains a version of the Japanese folkstory Urashima Tarō, which had been published in many older Japanese chronicles including the Nihon Shoki and the Man'yōshū. The version in the Kojidan is titled Urashimako Den and is believed to be a much older version dating back to the Nara or Hakuhō period, based on vocabulary usage. Additionally the Urashima version of the Kojidan differs significantly from other Urashima stories in how it places more emphasis and embellishes the role of Emperor Junwa.
