= Peter MacMillan =

Irish translator

- Born: 1959 (age 66–67); Kildare, Ireland
- Occupation: translator
- Known for: Japanese to English translations
- Notable work: Ogura Hyakunin Isshu

Peter MacMillan is an Irish translator living in Japan. His 2008 English language translation of Ogura Hyakunin Isshu (One Hundred Poets, One Poem Each) has won translation awards in Japan and the United States and his 2018 work of ‘’The Tales of Ise’’ in 2018 was nominated for the PEN International Poetry Translation Prize.

== Early life ==
MacMillan grew up in the countryside around Kildare, one of eight children. His father was an art dealer and died in 2008. MacMillan was very close to his mother growing up. He left Ireland to work first in the USA, before moving to Japan. He was forced to leave Ireland due to a lack of job opportunities there in the late 1980s.

== Professional activities ==
Macmillan has lived in Japan since the late 1980s , working as a translator, lecturer at the University of Tokyo and an interpreter of Japanese culture. One of his works on Japanese consumerism caught the attention of Akie Abe, wife of then Prime Minister Shinzo Abe. She was very interested in works promoting Japanese culture and was drawn to MacMillan's books. He has also worked as a cultural commentator on Japanese television, hosting a program called “Magical Japanese” on NHK.

His column “To the Forest of the Stars", appeared in the Asahi Shimbun newspaper, starting in 2019 until 2024. It was described as “column that breaks in the depths of the Japanese world view while rebirthing Yamato in English”.

He has dabbled in the visual arts, hosting an art exhibition both inside and outside, at the Sony Building in Tokyo in 2013. He also published a karuta card game in English, designed to teach Japanese culture, first presented to the public with American ambassador Caroline Kennedy in 2017.

== Honors ==
Japanese scholar Donald Keene has said that MacMillan is “the premier translator of Japanese literature of his generation.” He was also nominated for a PEN Translation award in 2018.
