= Ariwara no Yukihira =

Japanese Heian period courtier and bureaucrat

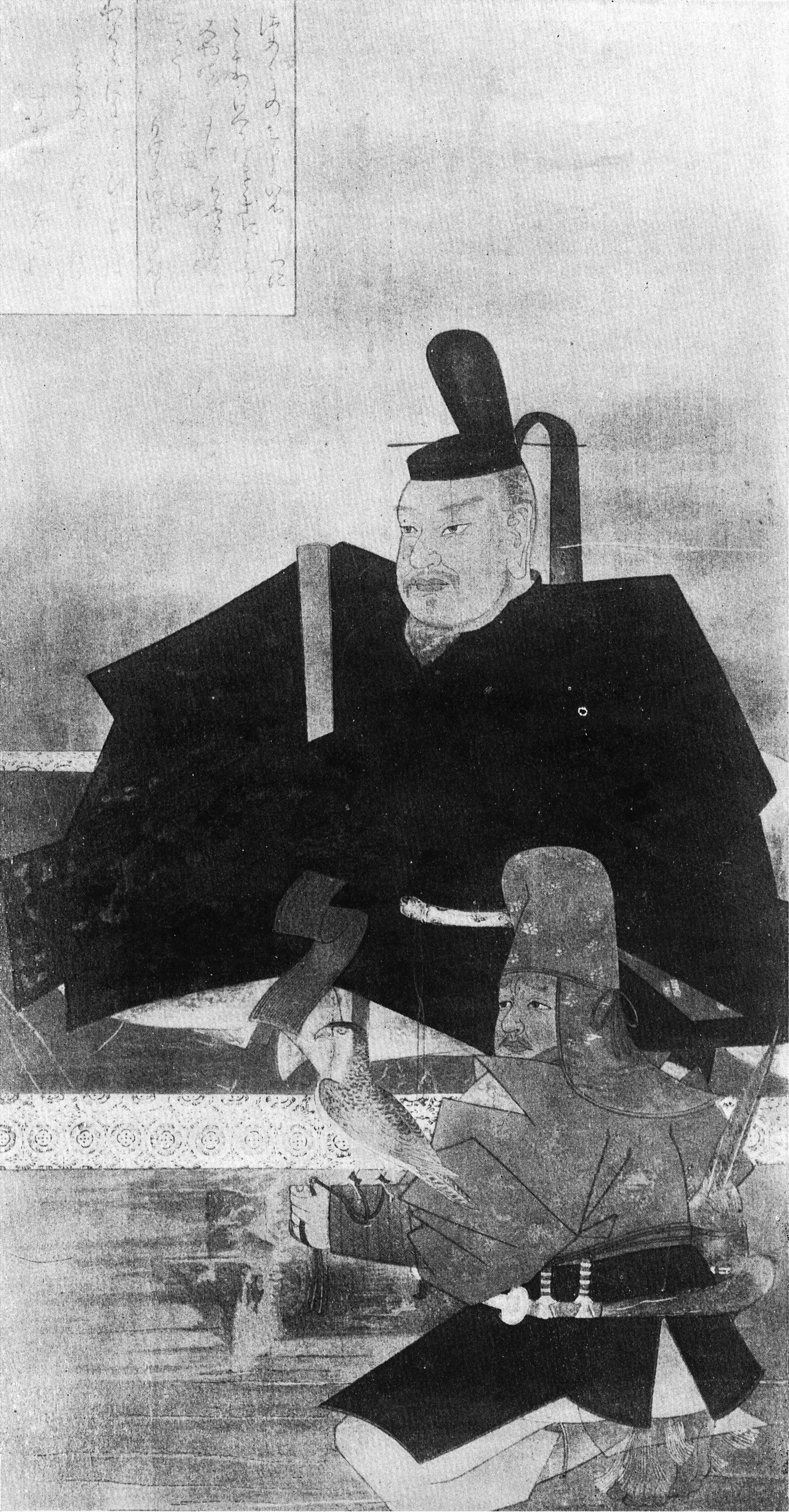

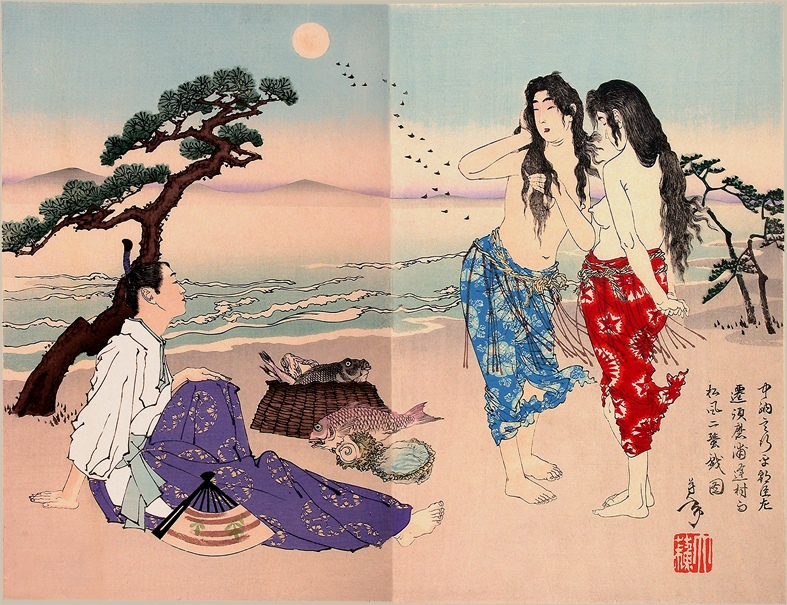
Ariwara no Yukihira (left) in exile on Suma Island with Matsukaze and Murasame, depicted in an 1887 woodblock print by Yoshitoshi.

Ariwara no Yukihira (在原 行平; 818 – September 6, 893) was a Japanese Heian period courtier and bureaucrat, who held a number of positions over the course of his life. At one time or another, he was governor of the provinces of Harima, Bizen, Shinano, and Bitchū. He also served as Councillor (中納言, chūnagon), Minister of Agriculture (民部卿, minbukyō), and inspector (azechi) of Mutsu and Dewa provinces.

Yukihira was also a poet, many of his works being published alongside those of his brother, Narihira. He also established a school, called Shogaku-in, for the purpose of educating members of the Ariwara family.

His most famous poem, no. 16 in the Ogura Hyakunin Isshu is as follows:

Japanese text	Romanized Japanese	English translation
立ち別れ いなばの山の 峰に生ふる まつとし聞かば 今帰り来む	Tachi-wakare inaba no yama no mine ni ouru matsu to shi kikaba ima kaeri kon	Though I may leave for Mt. Inaba, famous for the pines covering its peak, if I hear you pine for me I'll come straight home to you.

== Bibliography ==
McMillan, Peter (2010). One Hundred Poets, One Poem Each: A Translation of the Ogura Hyakunin Isshu. New York: Columbia University Press. ISBN 9780231143998.
