= Kandani Shrine =

Shinto shrine in Sakaide, Kagawa, Japan

Coordinates: 34.3248°N 133.9167°E

- 神谷神社
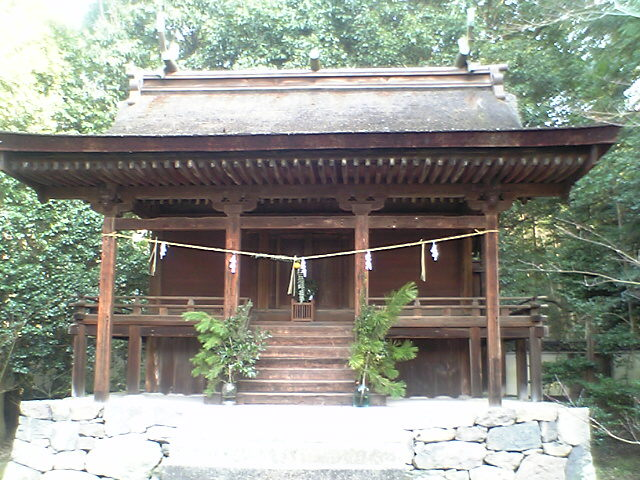
- Main Hall

Religion
- Affiliation: Shinto
- Prefecture: Kagawa
- Deity: Kagu-tsuchi, Okitsuhiko no Mikoto, Okitsuhime no Mikoto
- Type: Shikinaisha; Formerly Gō-sha

Location
- Location: 621 Kandanicho, Sakaide, Kagawa 762-0018, Japan
- Municipality: Sakaide
- Country: Japan
- Interactive map of Kandani Shrine
- Prefecture: Kagawa

Architecture
- Style: 3-bay (4-column) Nagare-zukuri
- Established: 812; 1214 years ago

Kandani Shrine (神谷神社, Kandani jinja) is a Shinto shrine located in Sakaide, Kagawa Prefecture, Japan. It enshrines the kami Kagu-tsuchi (火結命), Okitsuhiko no mikoto (奥津彦命), and Okitsuhime no mikoto (奥津姫命). According to legend, this shrine was established in 812. The shrine's main hall (本殿, honden) has been designated a Japanese National Treasure.

== See also ==
- List of Shinto shrines in Japan
