= Sunport Takamatsu =

Coordinates: 34°21′10.4″N 134°2′47.3″E

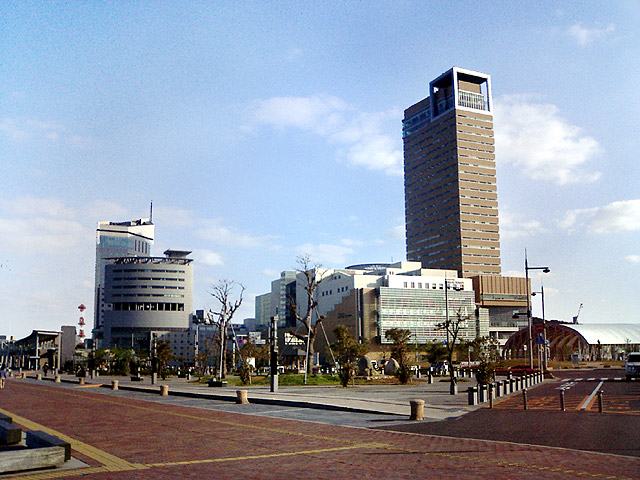
Sunport-Takamatsu complex in Takamatsu City.

Sunport Takamatsu (サンポート高松, Sanpōto Takamatsu) is a commercial and residential area in Hamanochō, Takamatsu, Kagawa Prefecture, Japan. It is a redevelopment district located on the site of the former Takamatsu Freight Depot in Hamanochō. The development includes a shopping mall, hotel, apartments, convenience stores and several restaurants. Sunport also acts as the passenger terminal for JR Shikoku's Takamatsu Station, the ferries at Port of Takamatsu, a wide range of taxi and bus companies, and offers bicycle and car rentals. The headquarters of JR Shikoku is located here as well.

== Nearby attractions ==
- Ritsurin Garden
- Takamatsu Castle (Sanuki)

== Access ==
- Takamatsu Station
- Takamatsu Chikkō Station (Kotohira Line)

== See also ==
- Port of Takamatsu
