= Port of Takamatsu =

Port of Takamatsu 高松港
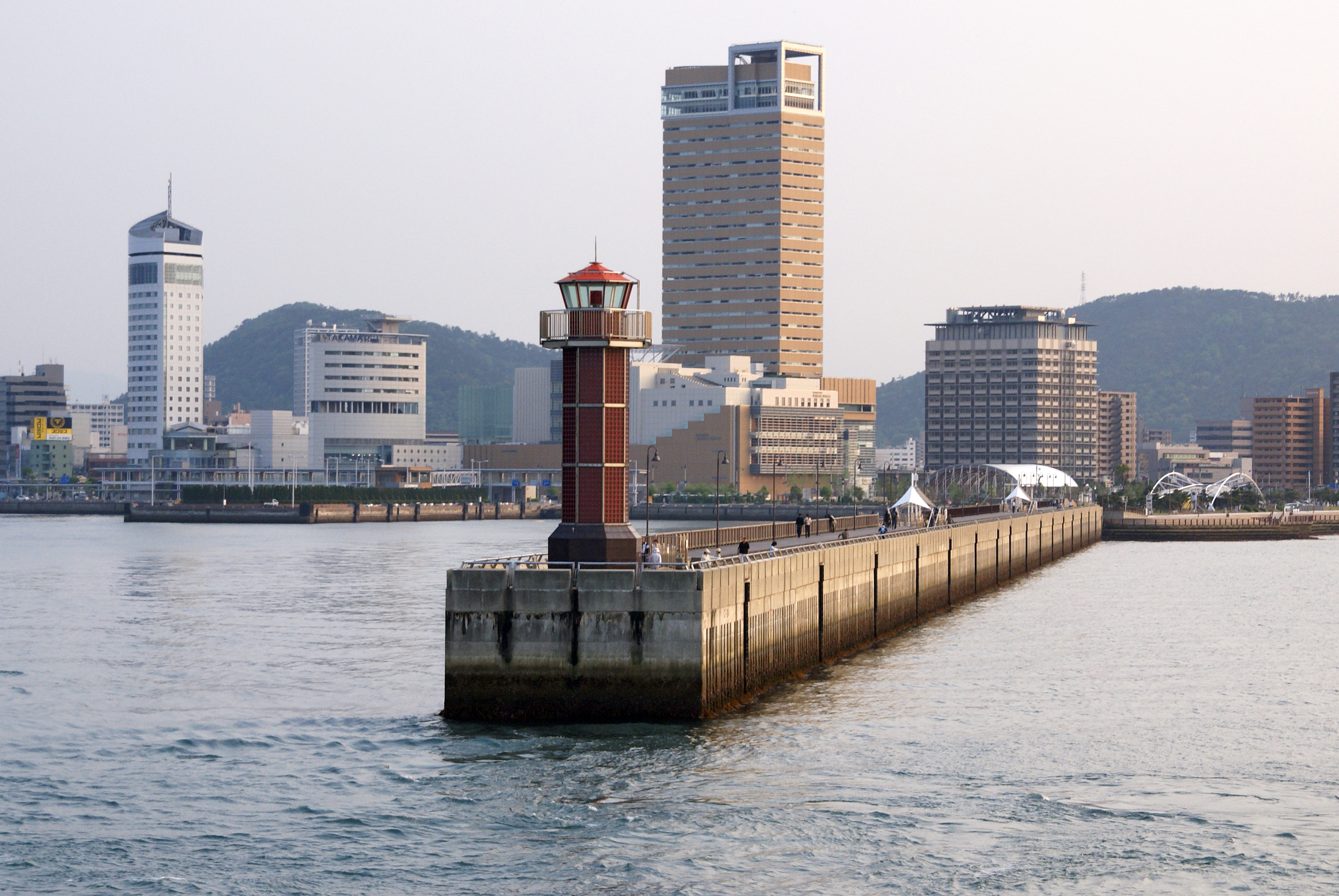
- Port of Takamatsu
- Interactive map of Port of Takamatsu 高松港

Location
- Country: Japan
- Location: Takamatsu, Kagawa
- Coordinates: 34°22′N 134°3′E

The Port of Takamatsu (高松港, Takamatsu-kō) is a seaport in Takamatsu, Kagawa Prefecture, Japan. The port serves the islands of the Seto Inland Sea with car ferries and passenger-only high-speed ferries. Major routes include those to Shodoshima and Naoshima.

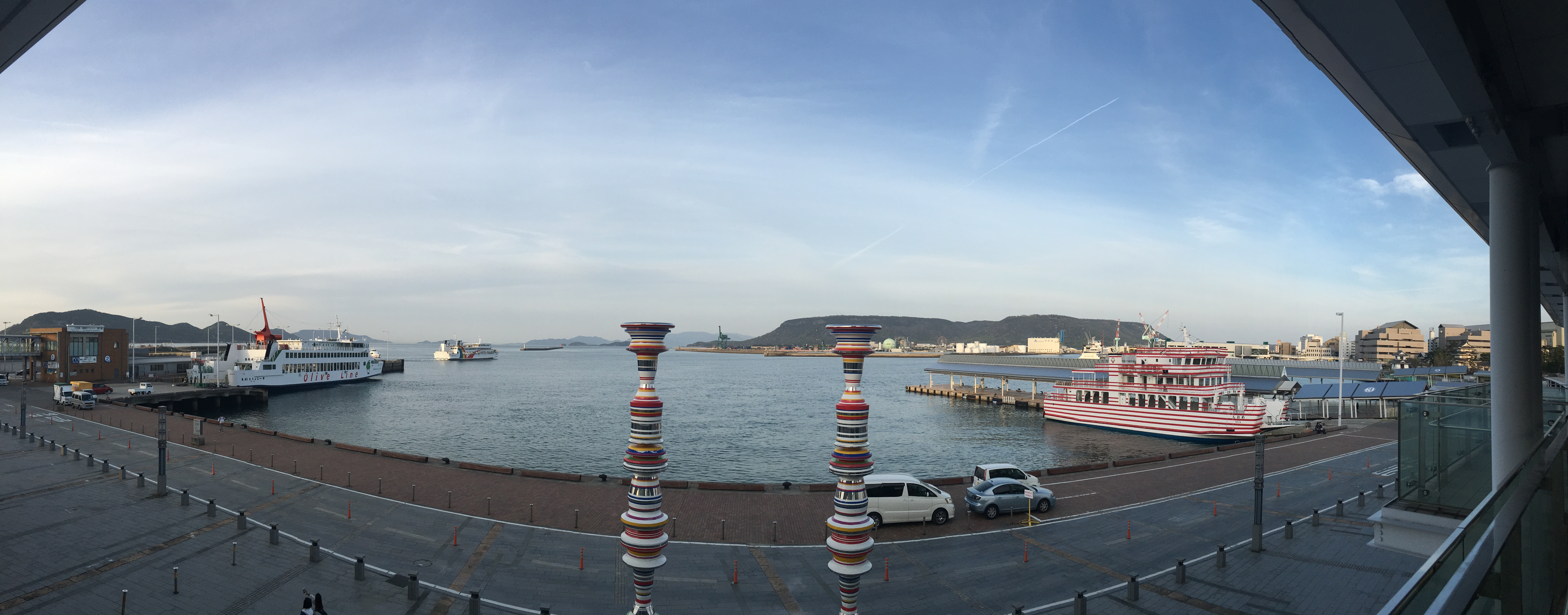
Panorama view of the Port of Takamatsu

== See also ==
- Sunport Takamatsu
