= Mount Iino =

Mountain in Japan

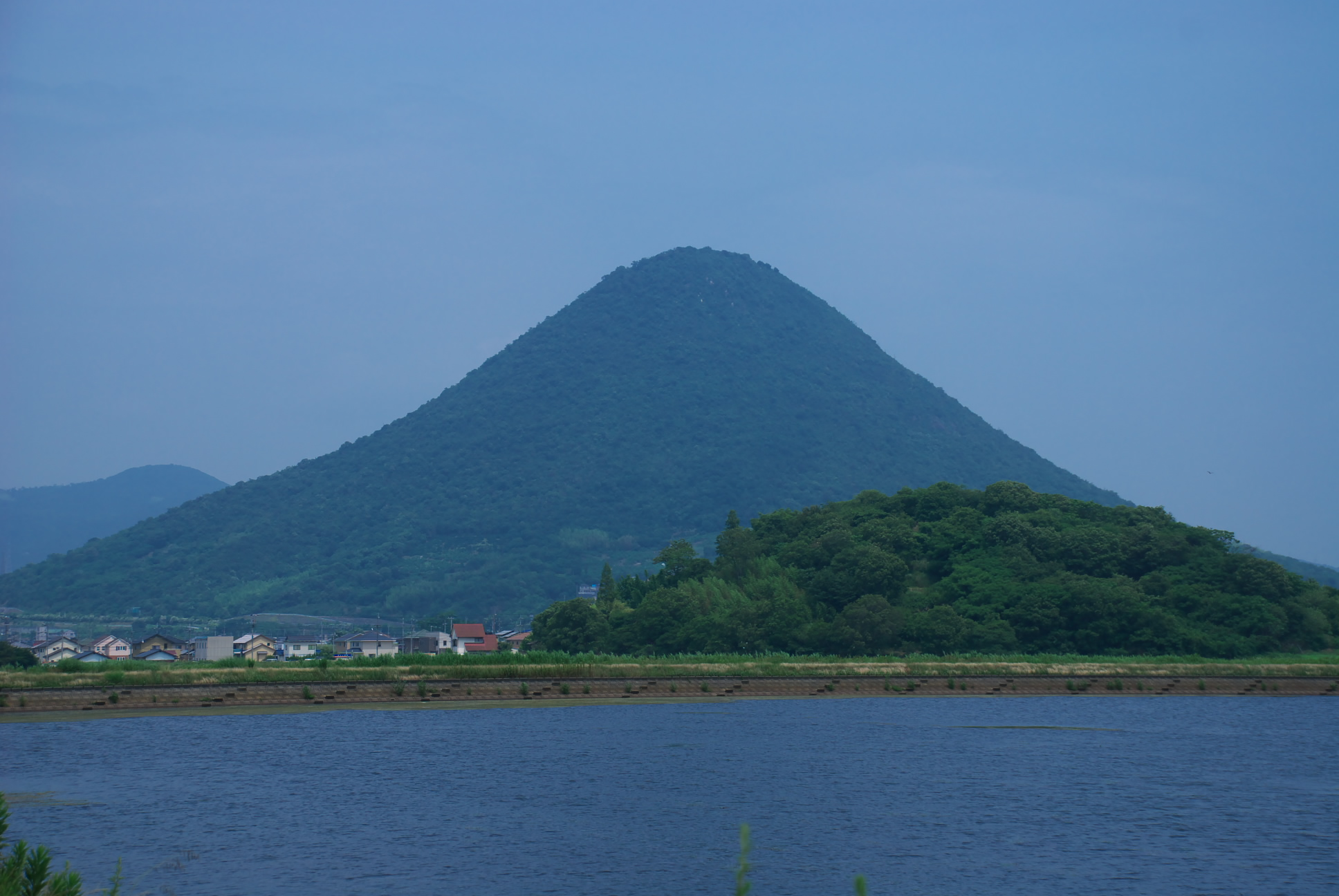
- Mount Iino

Highest point
- Elevation: 422 m (1,385 ft)
- Coordinates: 34°16′27″N 133°50′45″E

Geography
- Location within Japan
- Country: Japan
- Prefecture: Kagawa
- Cities: Sakaide and Marugame

Geology
- Mountain type: Butte

Climbing
- First ascent: unknown

Mount Iino (飯野山, Iino-yama) is a 422-metre-high (1,385 ft) mountain on the border of Sakaide and Marugame in Kagawa Prefecture, Japan.

== Outline ==
Mount Iino is also called Sanuki Fuji because of its resemblance to Mount Fuji.

This mountain is one of the Continued 100 Famous Japanese Mountains.

== Access ==
By bus or walk from Sakaide Station or Marugame Station.
