= Sakaide =

Sakaide 坂出市
- City
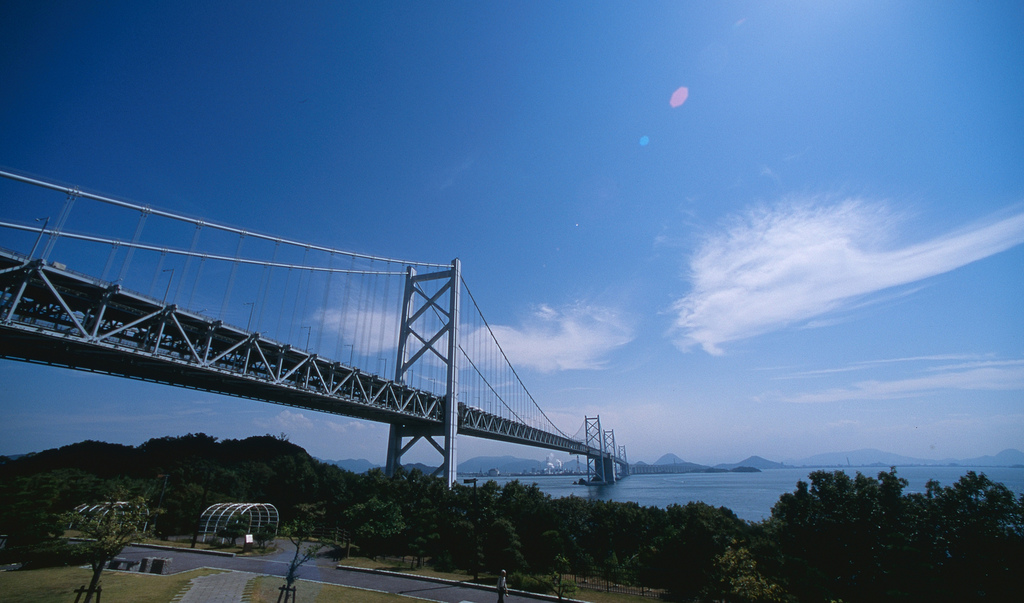
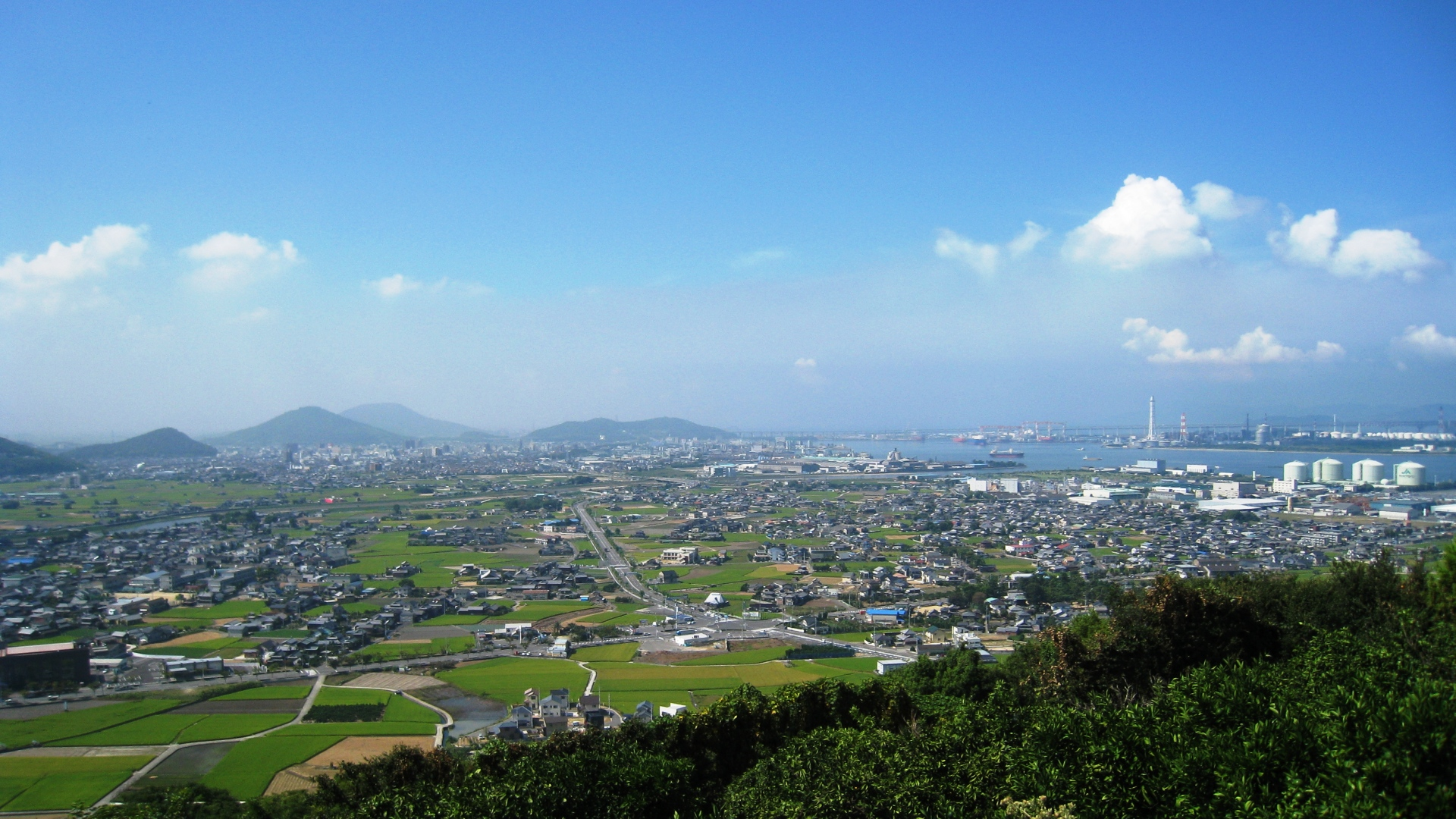
- Upper stage: Great Seto Bridge; Lower stage: Skyline of Sakaide city

- Flag Seal
- Location of Sakaide in Kagawa Prefecture

- Location in Japan
- Coordinates: 34°19′0″N 133°51′37″E
- Country: Japan
- Region: Shikoku
- Prefecture: Kagawa

Government
  - Mayor: Tetsuji Arifuku

Area
  - Total: 92.49 km^{2} (35.71 sq mi)

Population (October 1, 2022)
  - Total: 49,439
  - Density: 534.5/km^{2} (1,384/sq mi)
- Time zone: UTC+09:00 (JST)
- City hall address: 2-3-5, Muromachi, Sakaide-shi, Kagawa-ken 762-8601
- Website: Official website
- Symbols
- Flower: Sakura and Cosmos
- Tree: Sangoju (Viburnum odoratissimum var. awabuki))

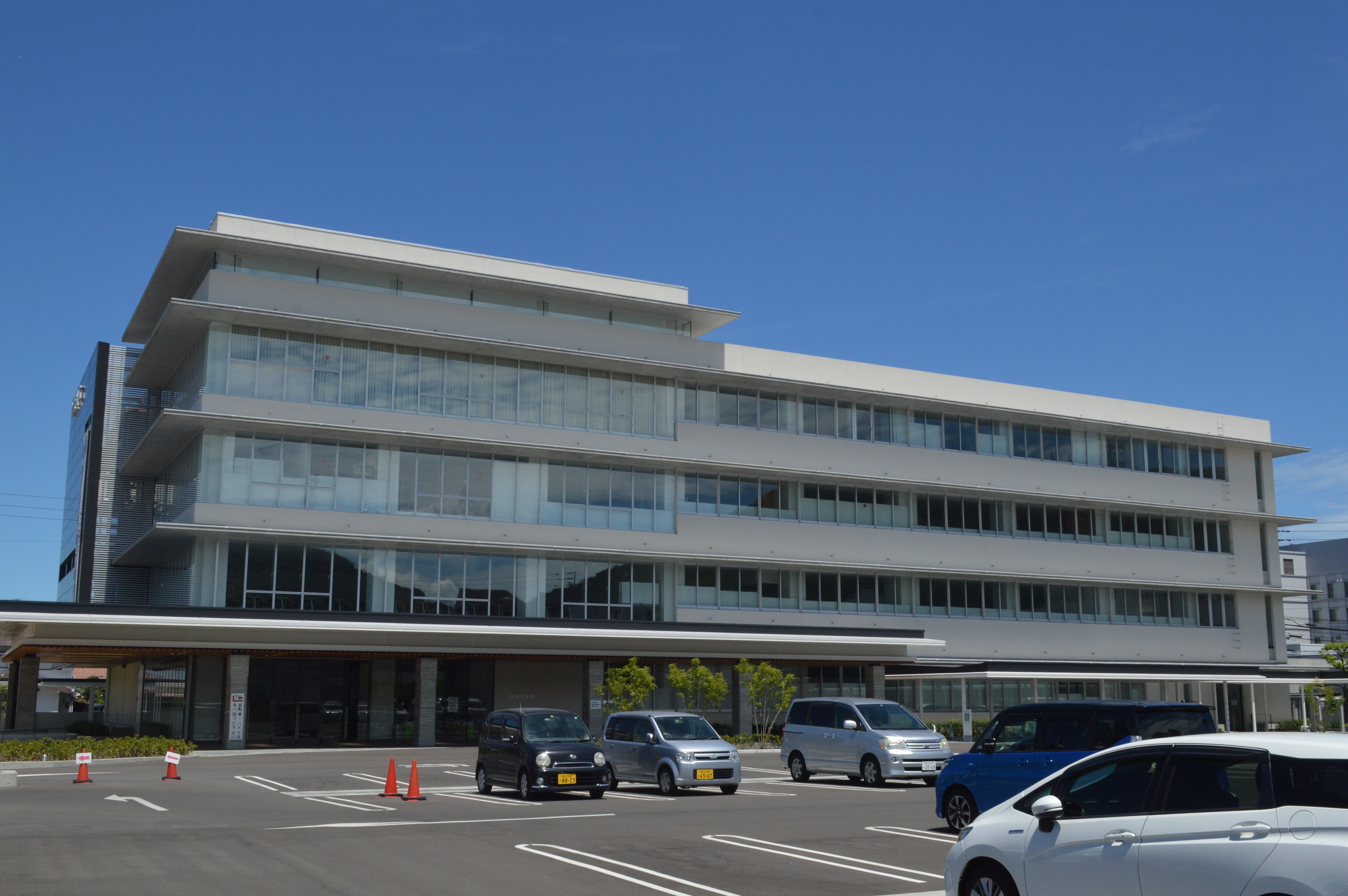
Sakaide City Hall

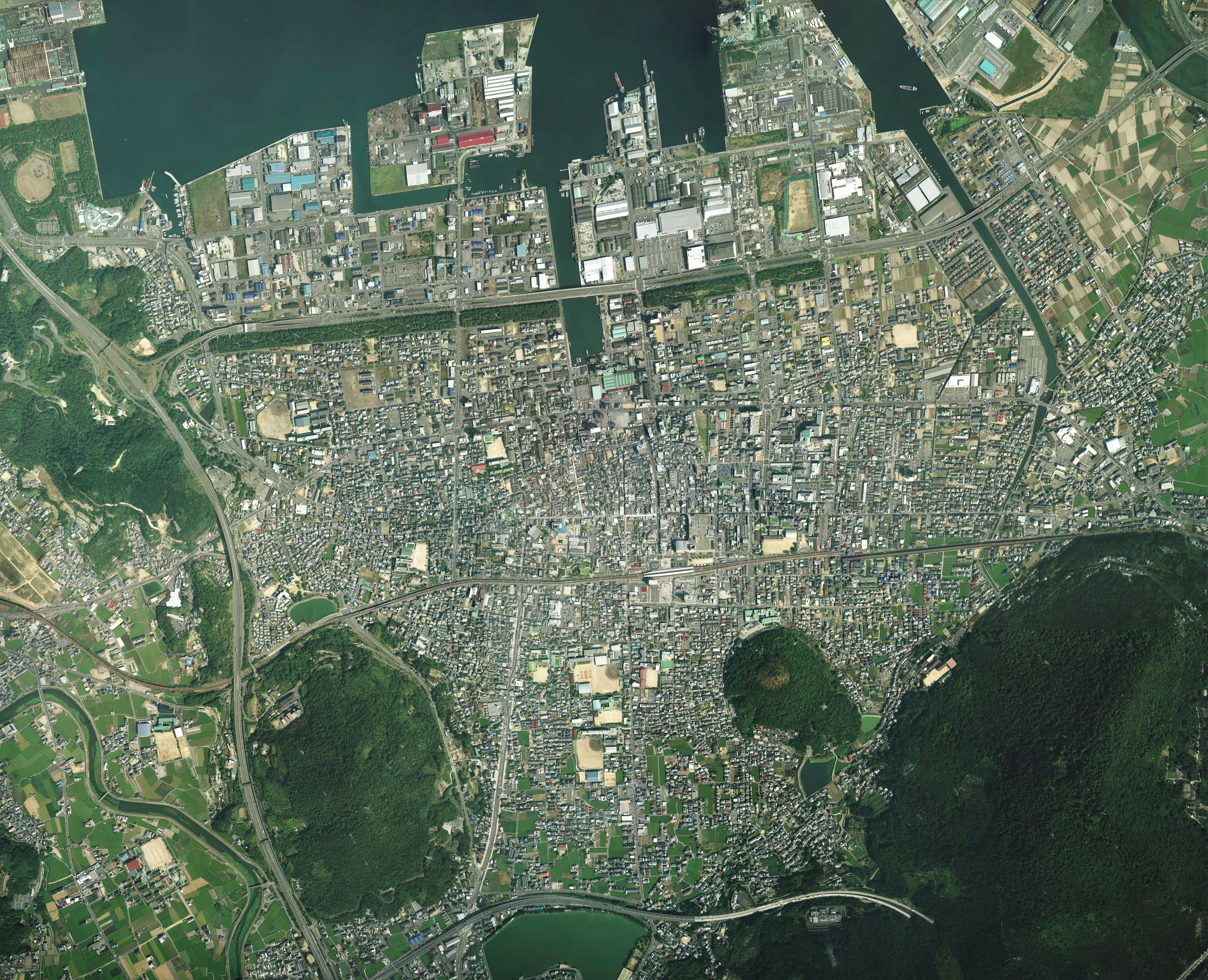
Aerial view of Sakaide city center

Sakaide (坂出市, Sakaide-shi) is a city located in Kagawa Prefecture, Japan. As of 1 October 2022, the city had an estimated population of 49,439 in 21,347 households and a population density of 530 persons per km^{2}. The total area of the city is 92.49 square kilometres (35.71 sq mi).

== Geography ==
Sakaide is located in north-center Kagawa Prefecture, on the island of Shikoku, facing the Seto Inland Sea to the north. The northern part of the city is flat and low elevation, with parts on reclaimed land. The city includes part of the Shiwaku Islands, including a number of islands which are connected by the Great Seto Bridge. The southern part of the city is hill, and as with many other cities and towns in Kagawa Prefecture, there are many reservoirs. Fuchu Dam constructed on the main stream of the Ayagawa River, creates Lake Fuchu. Mount Iino, nicknamed Sanuki Fuji located on the border between Marugame and Sakaide and is one of the "Sanuki Seven Fujis". The Great Seto Bridge connects the city with Kurashiki, Okayama Prefecture across the Seto Inland Sea.

=== Neighbouring municipalities ===
Kagawa Prefecture

- Ayagawa
- Marugame
- Takamatsu
- Utazu

=== Climate ===
Sakaide has a humid subtropical climate (Köppen Cfa) characterized by warm summers and cool winters with light snowfall. The average annual temperature in Sakaide is 15.6 °C. The average annual rainfall is 1,439 mm with September as the wettest month. The temperatures are highest on average in August, at around 26.5 °C, and lowest in January, at around 5.4 °C.

== Demographics ==
Per Japanese census data, the population of Sakaide has been declining steadily since the 1980s.

Historical population
Year	Pop.	±%
1950	66,572	—
1960	62,142	−6.7%
1970	64,147	+3.2%
1980	66,290	+3.3%
1990	63,876	−3.6%
2000	59,228	−7.3%
2010	55,621	−6.1%
2020	50,624	−9.0%

== History ==
The area of Sakaide was part of ancient Sanuki Province and has been inhabited since ancient times, with many kofun burial mounds found within the city limits. During the Asuka period the fortress of Kiyama was constructed to guard against the possibility of invasion from Tang dynasty China. During the Edo Period, the area was part of the holdings of Takamatsu Domain, and once flourished as a center for salt production. Following the Meiji restoration, the town of Sakaide was established with the creation of the modern municipalities system on February 15, 1890. It was elevated to city status on July 1, 1942.

== Government ==
Sakaide has a mayor-council form of government with a directly elected mayor and a unicameral city council of 20 members. Sakaide, together with Utazu, contributes three members to the Kagawa Prefectural Assembly. In terms of national politics, the city is part of Kagawa 2nd district of the lower house of the Diet of Japan.

== Economy ==
Sakaide is an industrial city, with shipbuilding and chemical industries, refineries and power stations located in the Bannoshu Rinkai Industrial Park, Hayashida-Agawahama Rinkai Industrial Park and other areas along the coast. Due to its position at the Shikoku end of the Great Seto Bridge, many logistics companies are concentrated are also concentrated in these areas.

== Education ==
Sakaide has 12 public elementary schools and five public middle schools operated by the city government, and one each by the national government. The city has three public high schools operated by the Kagawa Prefectural Board of Education, and the prefecture also operates one special education school for the handicapped.

== Transportation ==
=== Railways ===
JR Shikoku - Yosan Line / Seto-Ōhashi Line - Marine Liner

- Sanuki-Fuchū - Kamogawa - Yasoba - Sakaide

=== Highways ===
- Seto-Chūō Expressway
- Takamatsu Expressway
- National Route 11
- National Route 30
- National Route 438

== Sister cities ==
- Sausalito, California, United States, since February 2, 1988
- Lansing, Michigan, United States, friendship city since April 12, 1996

== Local attractions ==
- Fuchu Dam (Lake Fuchu)
- Great Seto Bridge
- Kagawa Prefectural Higashiyama Kaii Setouchi Art Museum, (Kaii Higashiyama`s Art Museum)
- Kandani Shrine
- Kiyama (A castle ruin of Yamato court)
- Mount Iino (Kagawa's Mount Fuji)
- Shiromine-ji, 81st temple on the Shikoku Pilgrimage
- Shōtsu-ji Castle (A castle ruin, Ikoma Chikamasa and Sengoku Hidehisa were commander of the castle)
- Tennō-ji, 79th temple on the Shikoku Pilgrimage.
- Tomb of Emperor Sutoku

== Gallery ==
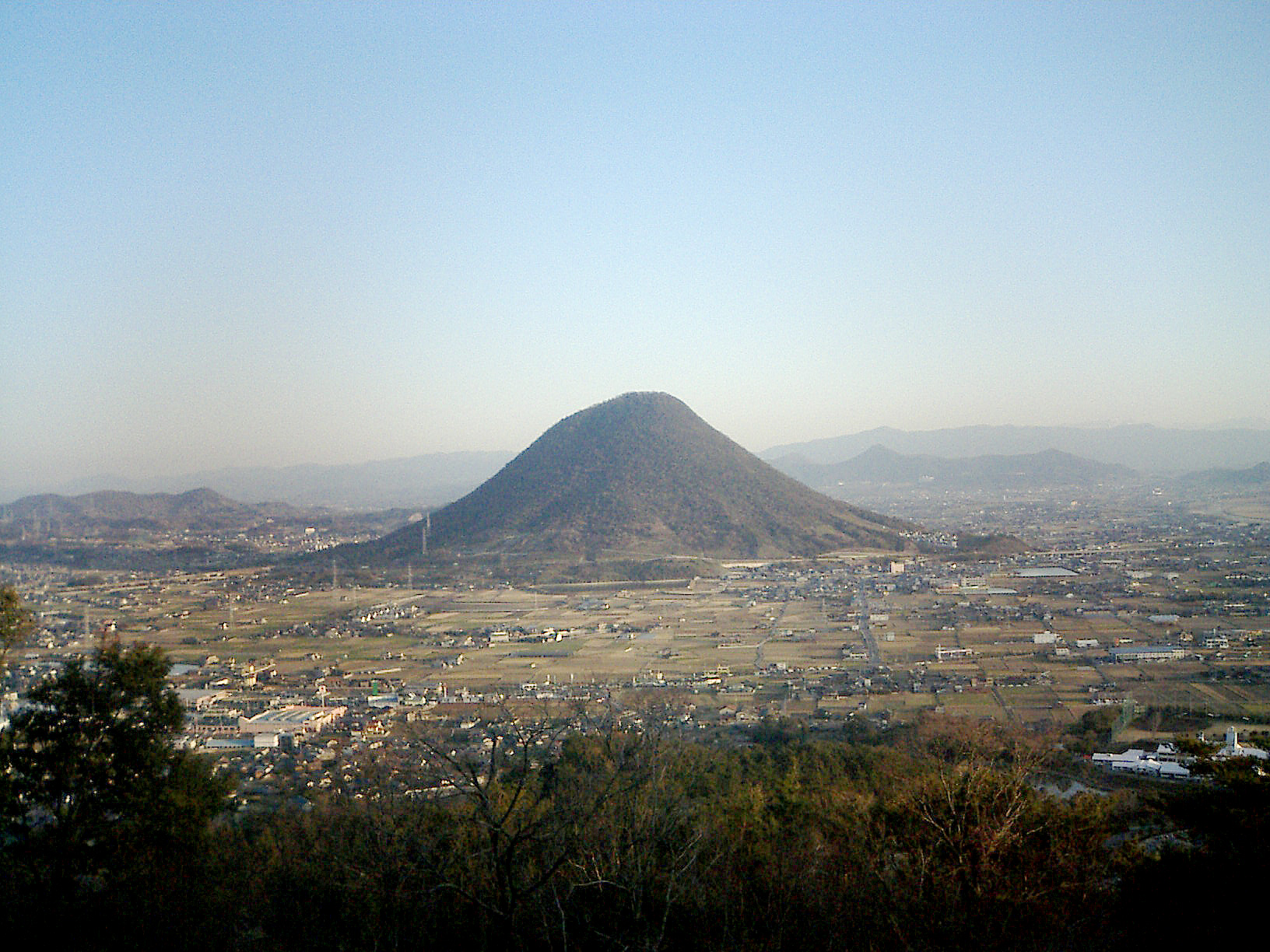
Mountain Iino

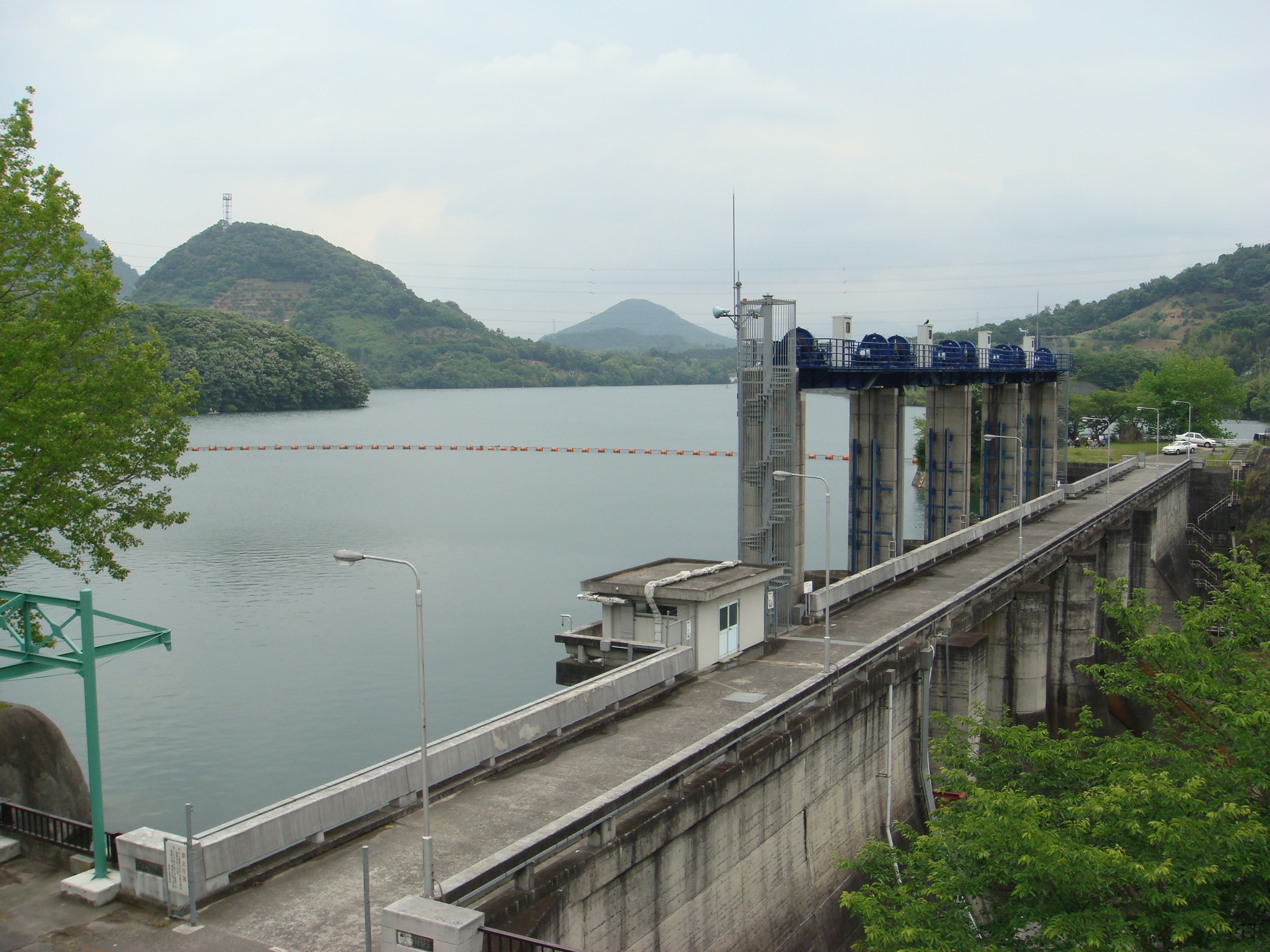
Lake Fuchu

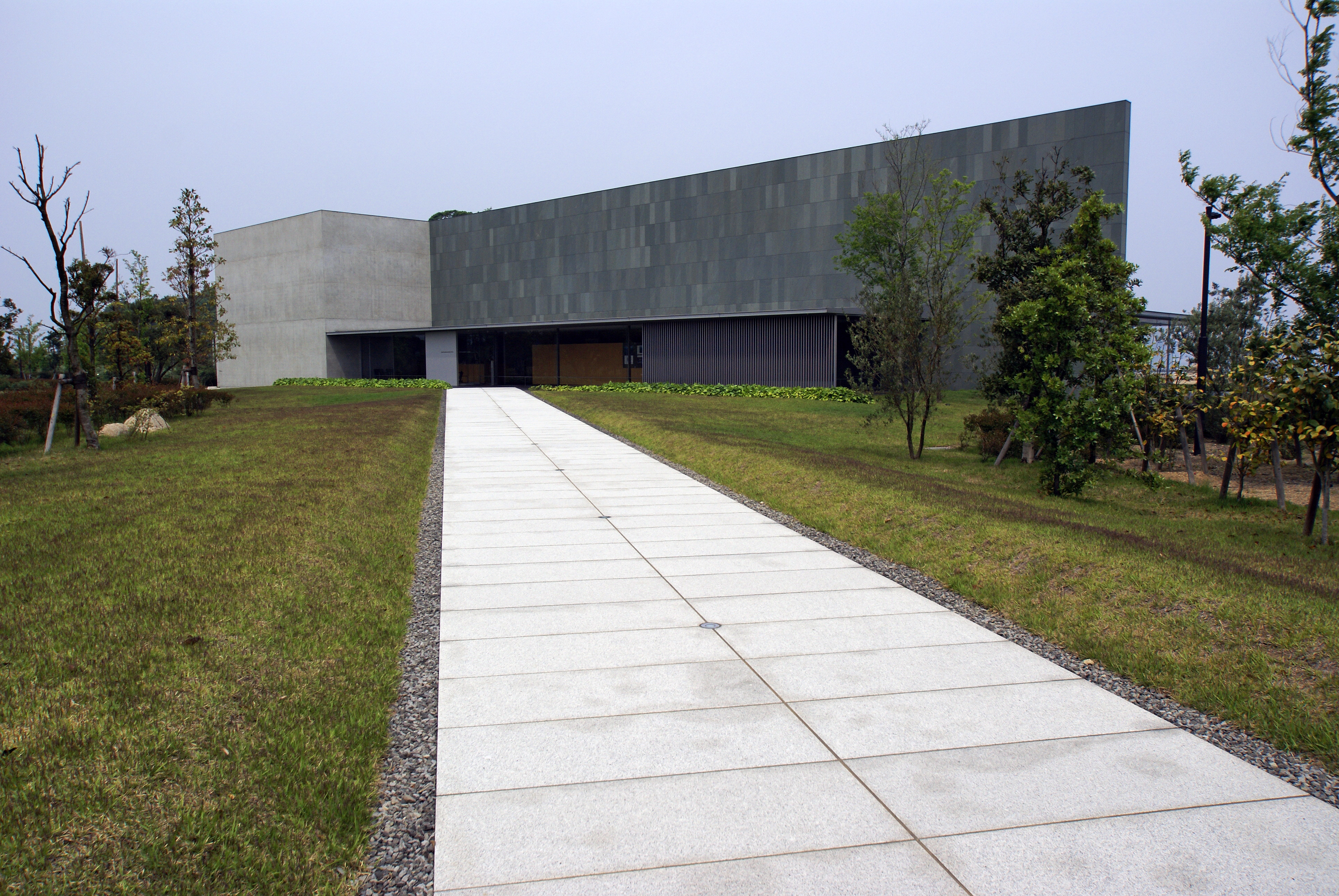
Kaii Higashiyama Art Museum

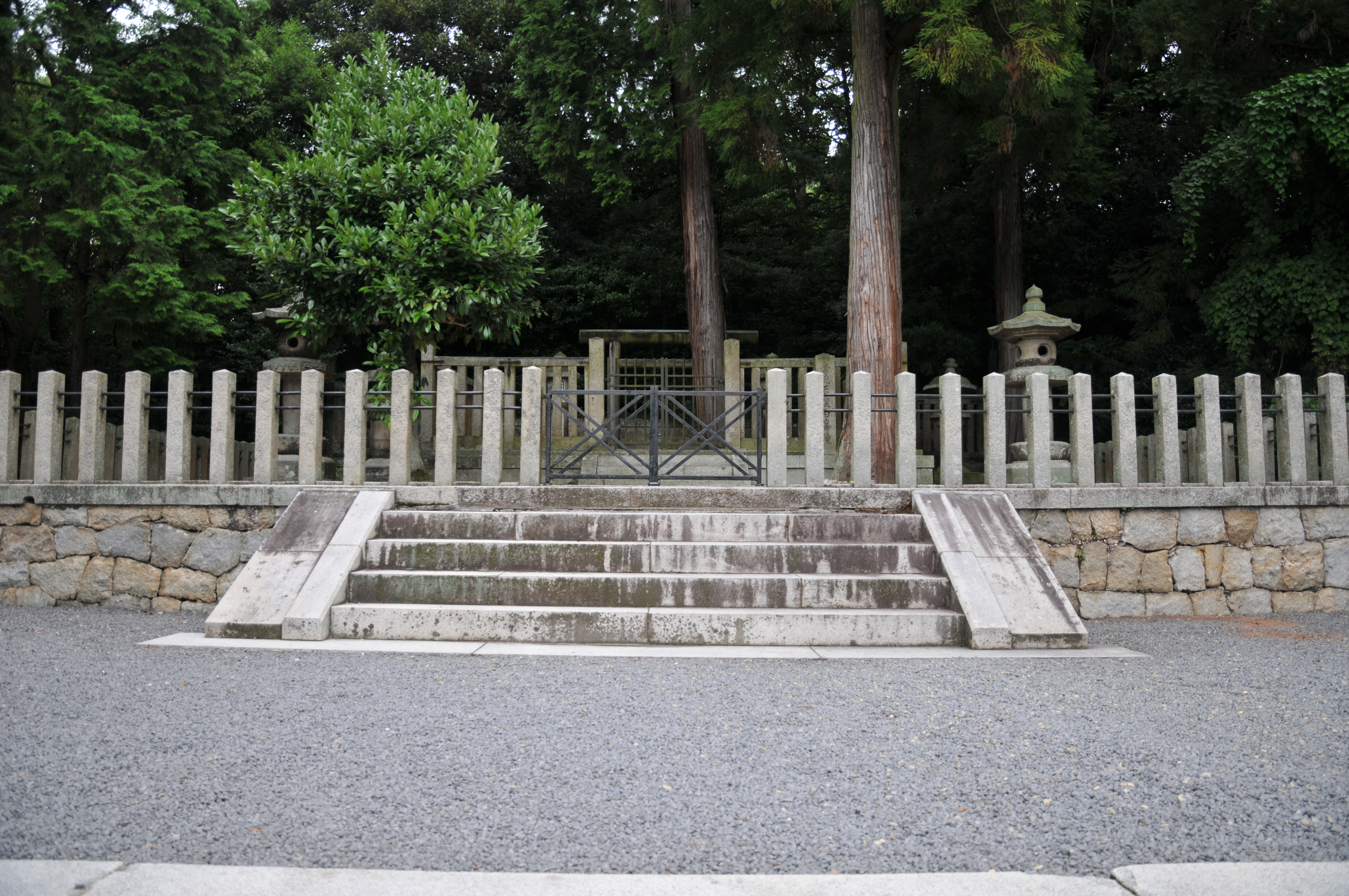
Memorial Shinto shrine and mausoleum honoring Emperor Sutoku

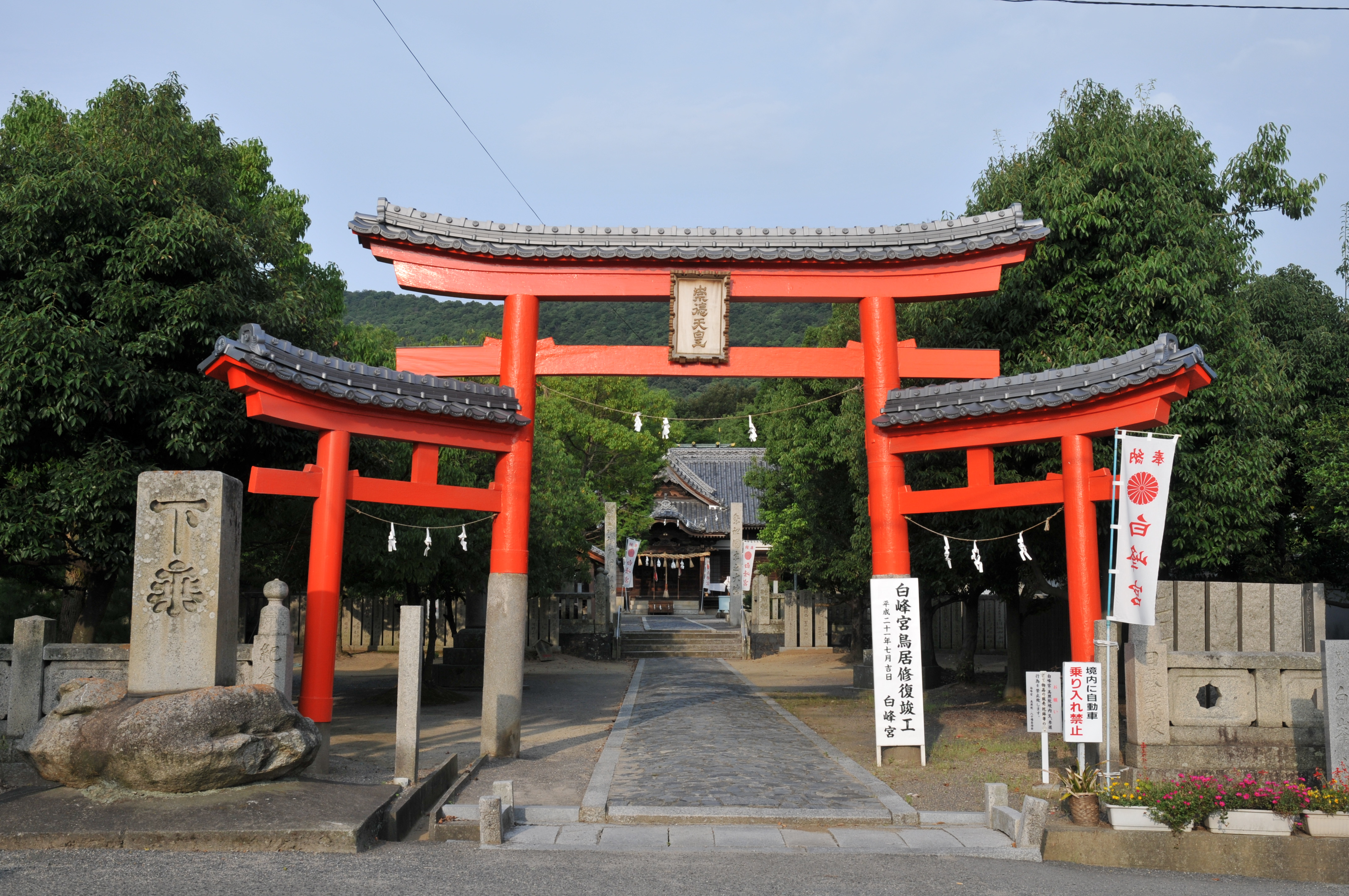
Shiramine Shrine

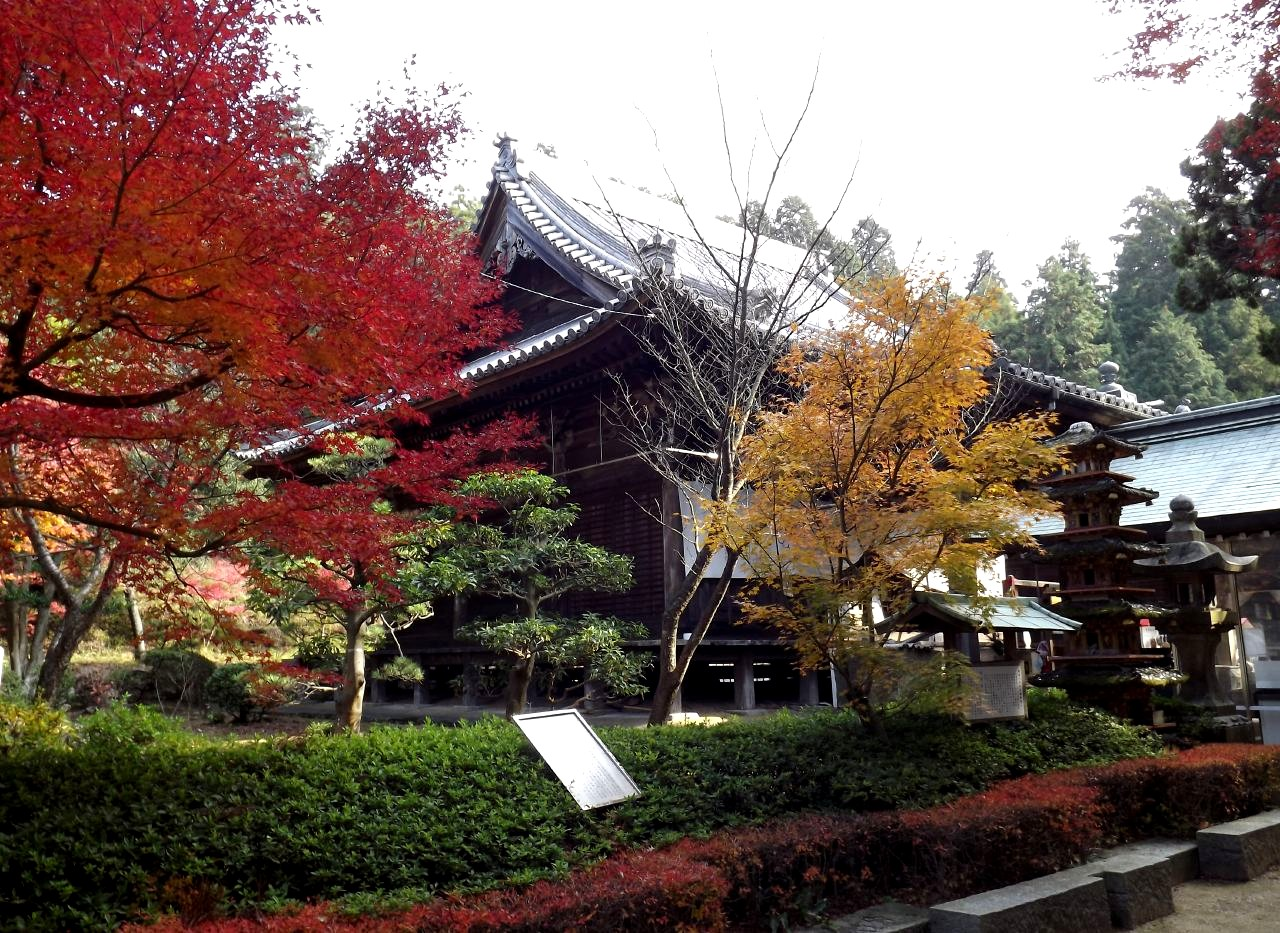
Shiromine-ji Temple

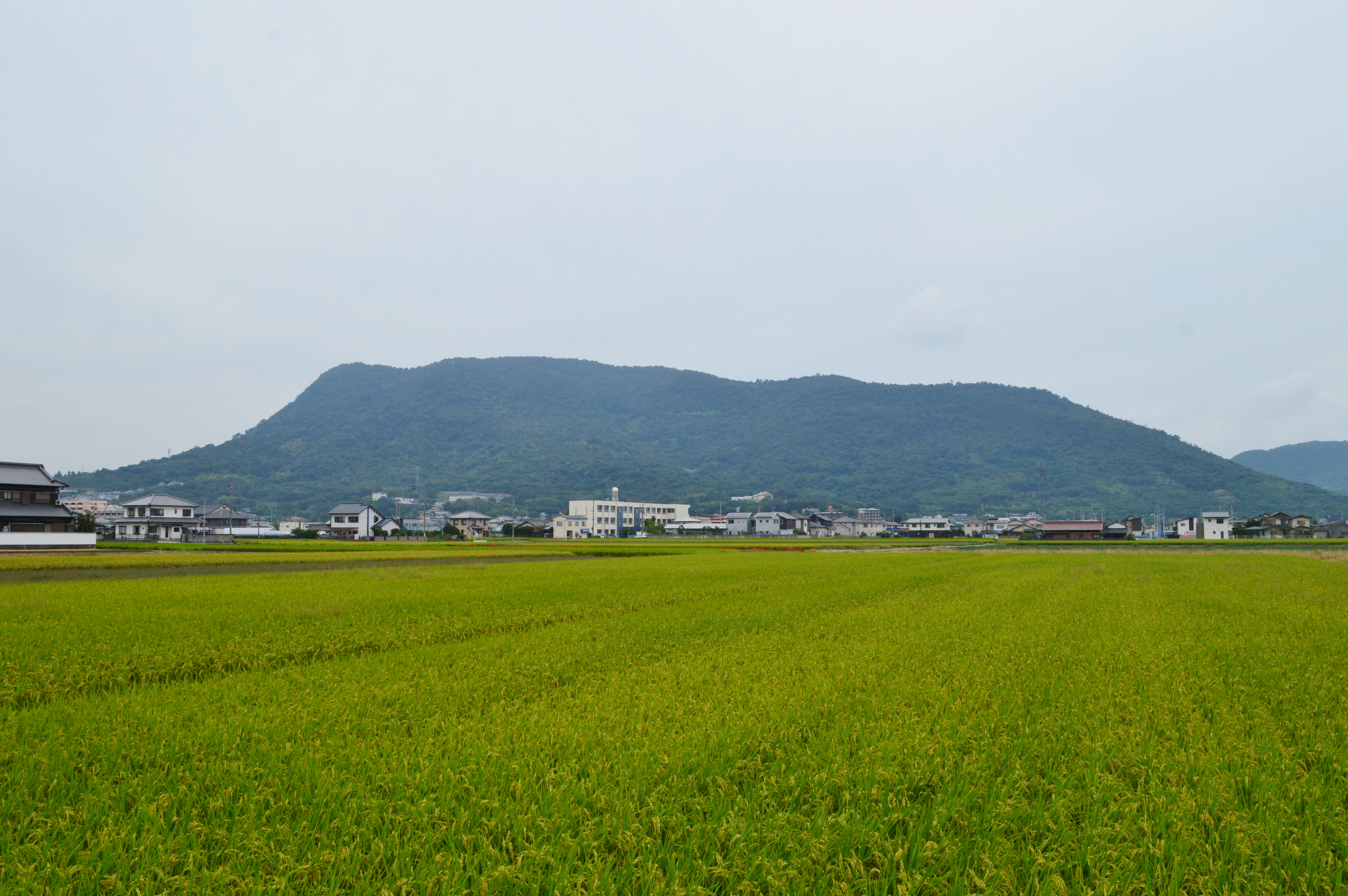
Kiyama

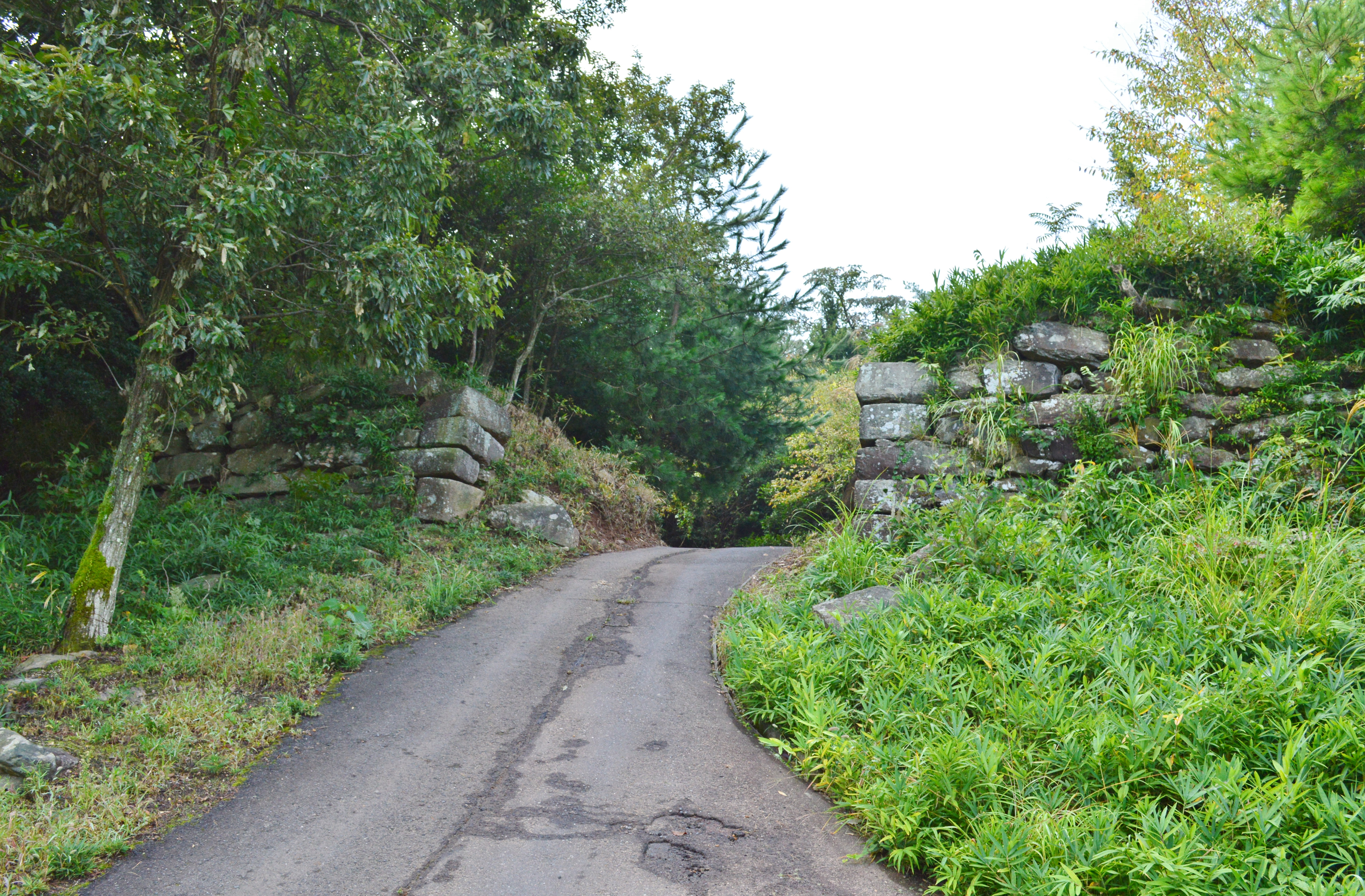
Kiyama's gate and stone wall

=== Festivals ===
- Sakaide Tengu Festival
- Sakaide Salt Festival (May)
- Sakaide Ohashi Festival (August)

== Noted people from Sakaide ==
- Juichi Tsushima, former Head of the Japan Olympic Committee
