= Fuchu Dam =

Coordinates: 34°17′04″N 133°55′17″E

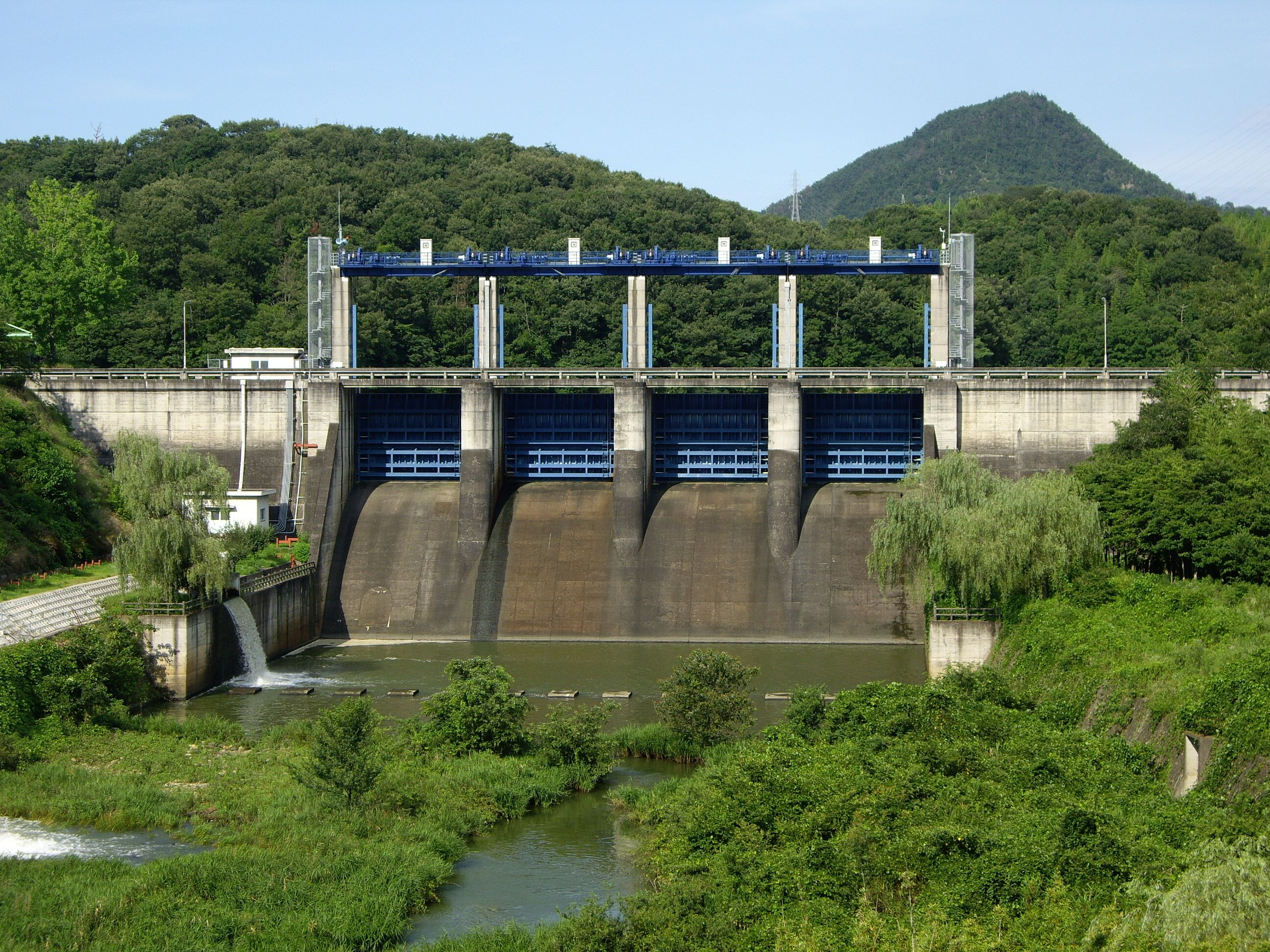
- Interactive map of Fuchu Dam
- Location: Kagawa Prefecture, Japan
- Construction began: 1962
- Opening date: 1966
- Construction cost: 2,400,000,000 JPY
- Operator: Kagawa Prefecture

Dam and spillways
- Type of dam: Concrete gravity dam
- Impounds: Aya River
- Height: 27.5 m (90 ft)
- Length: 131 m (430 ft)
- Dam volume: 39,000 m^{3}

Reservoir
- Creates: Lake Fuchu
- Total capacity: 8,000,000 m^{3}
- Catchment area: 122.7 km^{2}
- Surface area: 121 ha

Fuchu Dam (Japanese: 府中ダム) is a dam in Fuchu Town, Sakaide, Kagawa, Japan, completed in 1966. It dams the Aya River in the Aya River drainage system.

== Lake Fuchu ==
Fuchu Dam's reservoir, Lake Fuchu, along with Taki no Miya, was some of the picturesque scenery chosen as one of the "Timeless 100 Famous Views." This reservoir was called "Lake Fuchu" starting in the 1990s, and maps from before showed the lake as Fuchu Reservoir.

Lake Fuchu has canoe and rowboat competitions which are popular among high schools and employees of companies in the prefecture. It is being maintained as the East Shikoku Athletic Meet's venue for canoe competitions, a site of about 3 hectares with the Sakaide Canoe Training Center (boat-house and training room) and judge's chair and embark-disembark wharf for competitions. The course can be set at up to 9 lanes of 1000 meters, so it was designated by the JOC (Japan Olympic Committee) as a canoe race training facility, and players compete in Japanese championships and international athletes are sent to compete in international championship trials and such meetings there on a large scale. In August 2008, Finland's team used the same lake to practice before the Beijing Olympics.

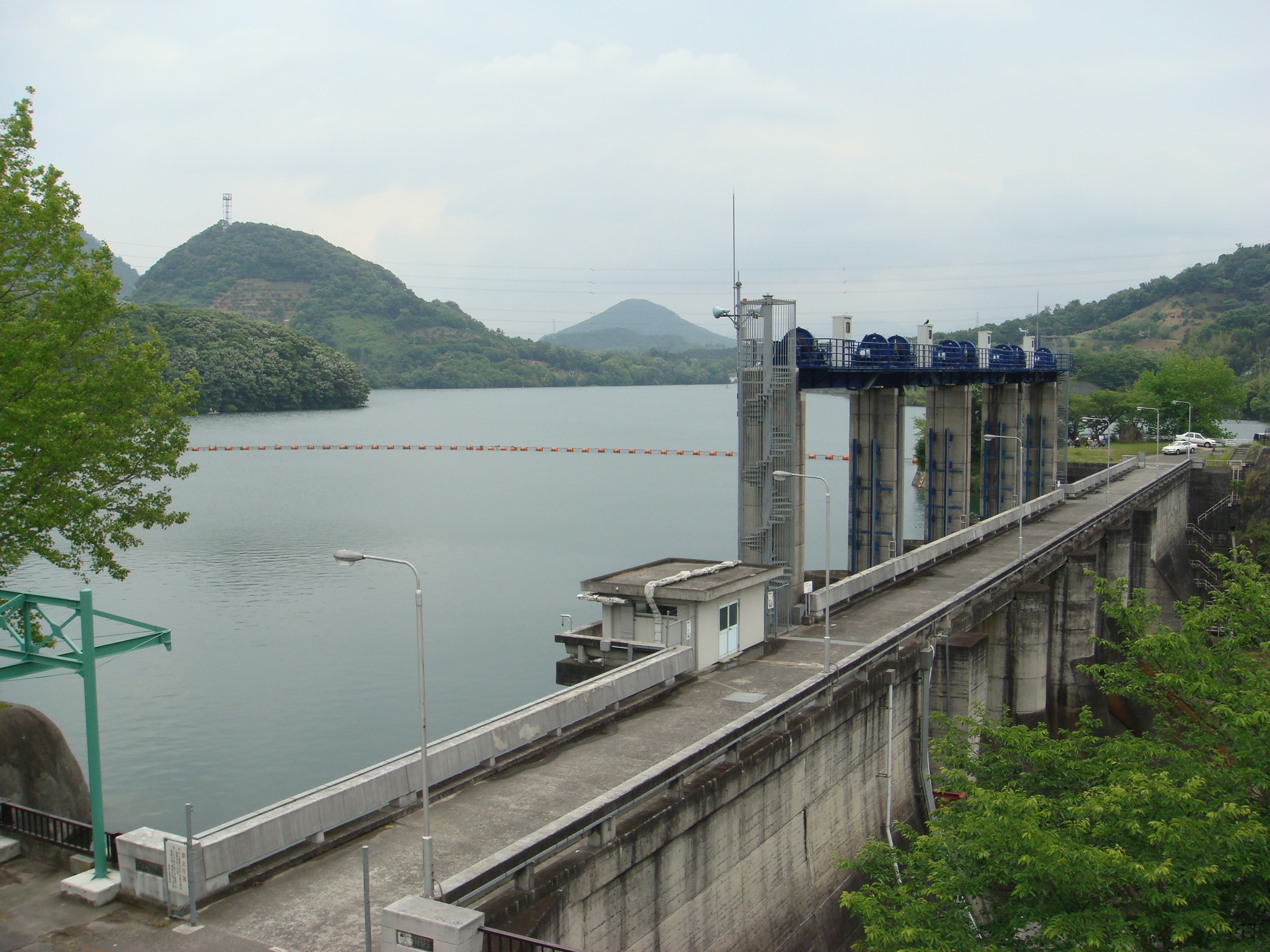
Lake Fuchu

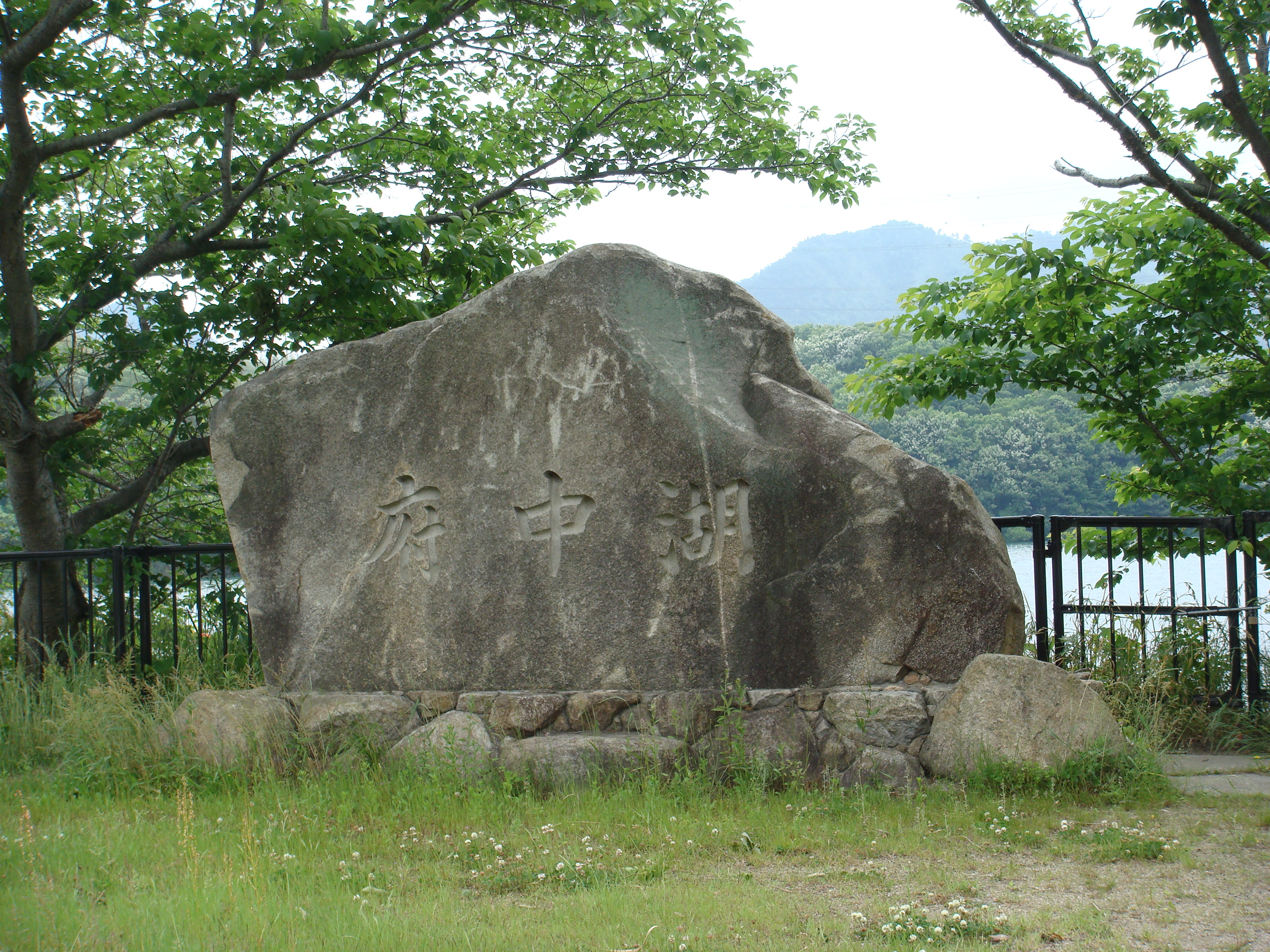
Stone monument for Lake Fuchu

== Main Competitions and Events Held ==
- East Shikoku Athletic Meet's Canoe Competition
- Japan National High School Rowing Competition of 1998
- Japan Canoe Racing Championship Title Meet
- Water Festival in Lake Fuchu
- Sakaide Lake Fuchu Dragon Canoe Meet
- National "Dowluck" Fishing Championship in Lake Fuchu
