= Kagawa Prefectural College of Health Sciences =

Higher education institution in Kagawa Prefecture, Japan

Coordinates: 34°19′19″N 134°09′28″E

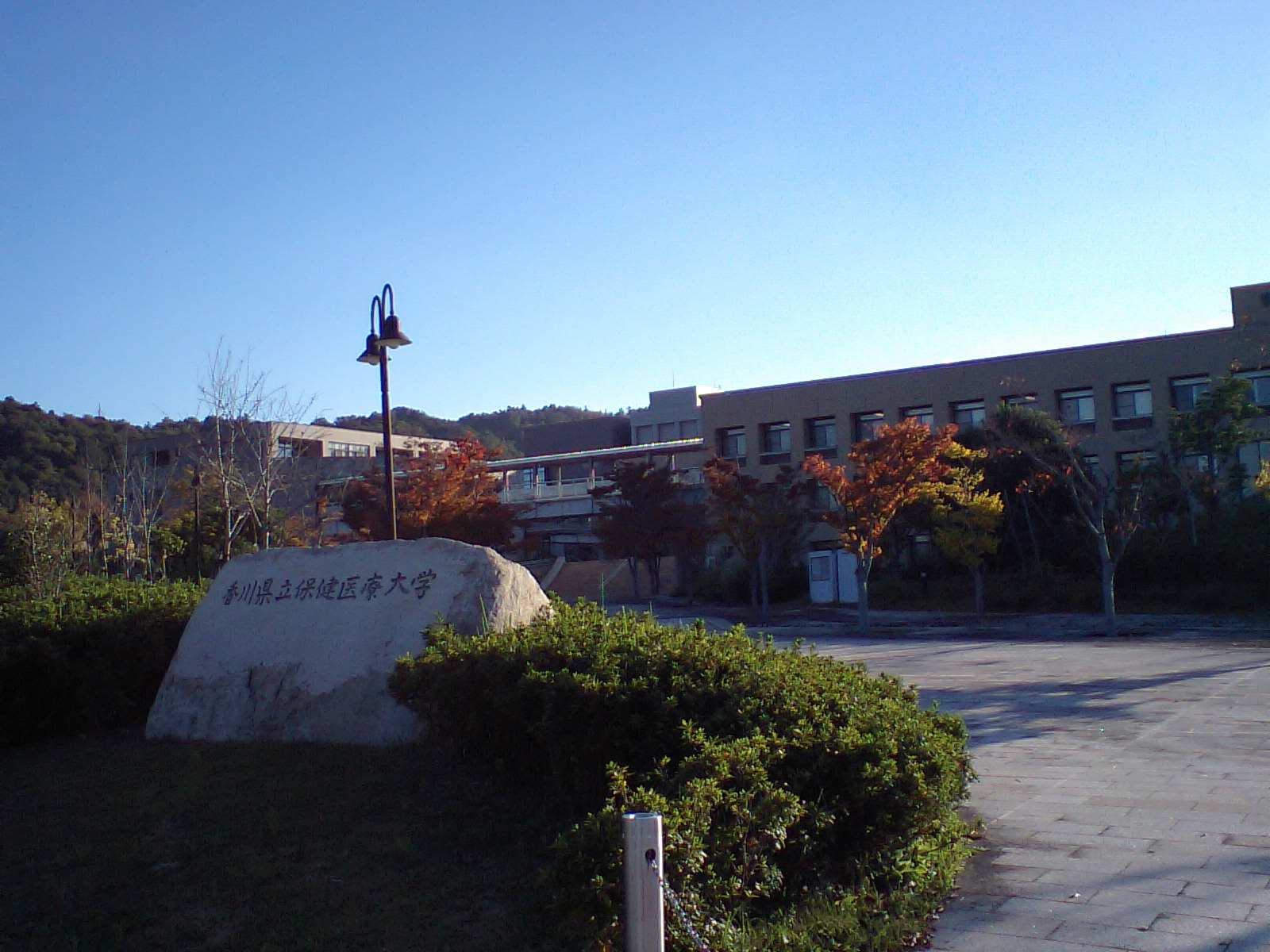
Kagawa Prefectural College of Health Sciences.

Kagawa Prefectural College of Health Sciences (香川県立保健医療大学, Kagawa kenritsu hoken iryō daigaku) is a public university in Takamatsu, Kagawa, Japan. The predecessor of the school was founded in 1999, and it was chartered as a university in 2004.
