= Kagawa Prefecture =

Prefecture of Japan

Coordinates: 34°16′N 133°57′E

Kagawa Prefecture 香川県
- Prefecture

Japanese transcription(s)
  - Japanese: 香川県
  - Rōmaji: Kagawa-ken
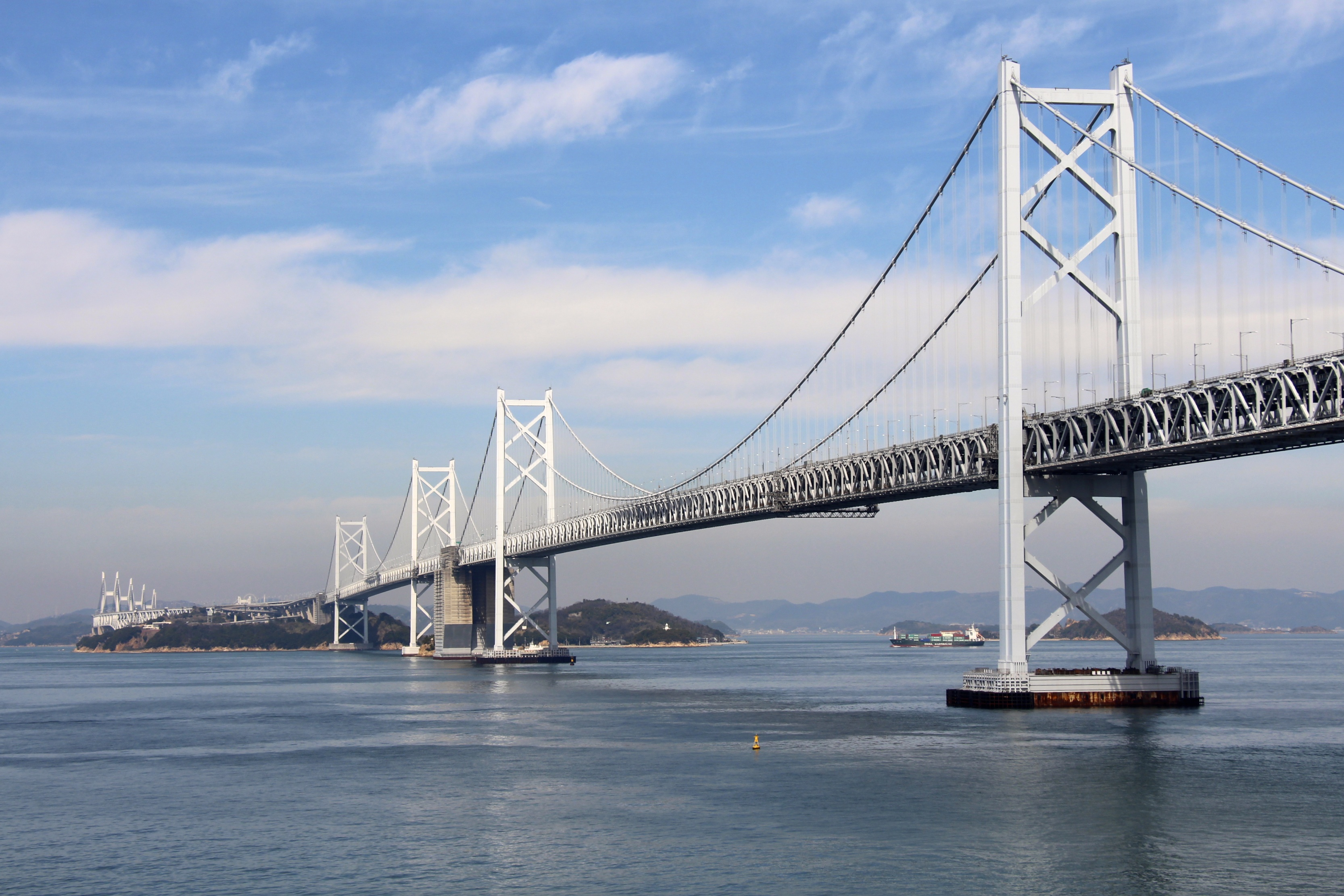
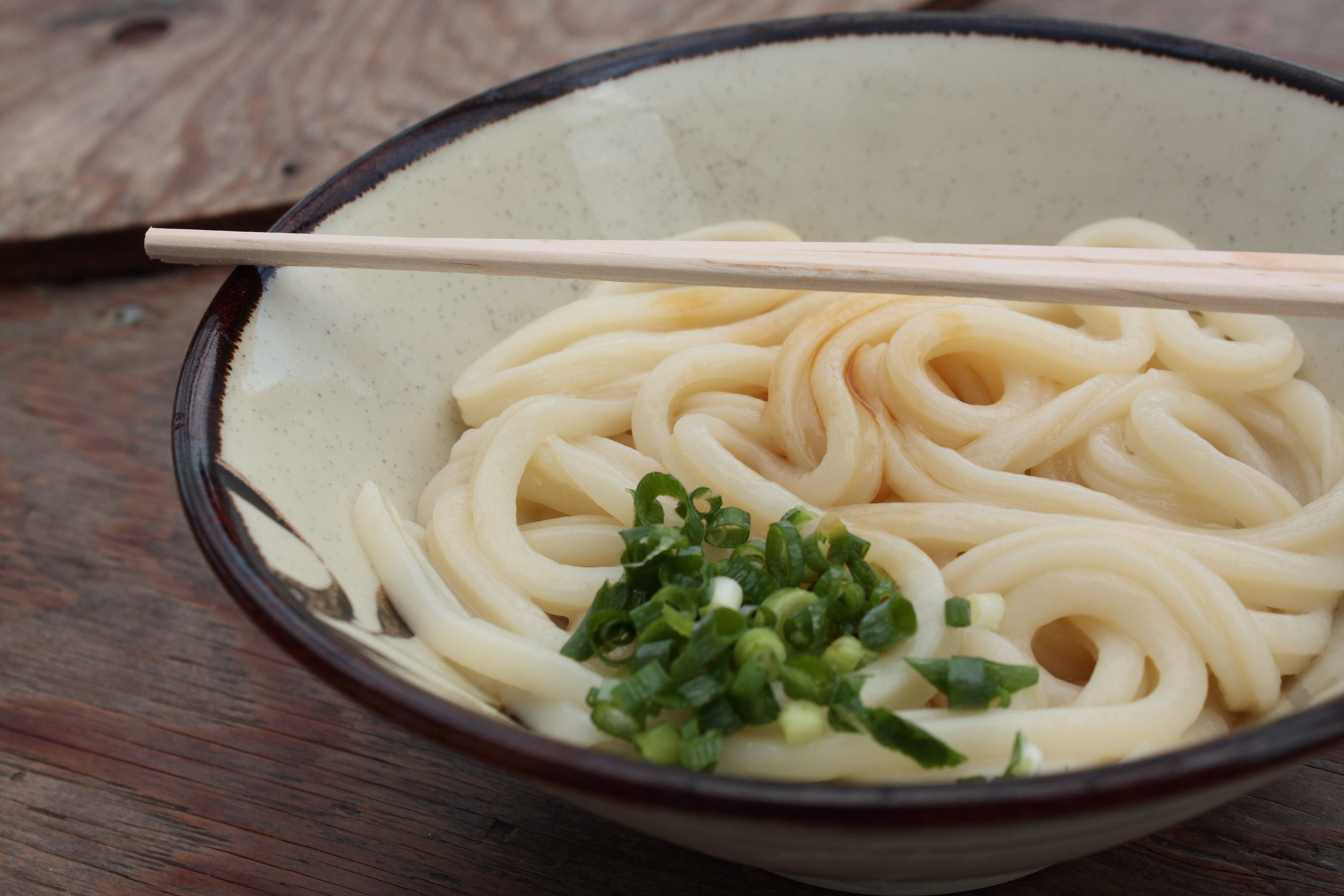
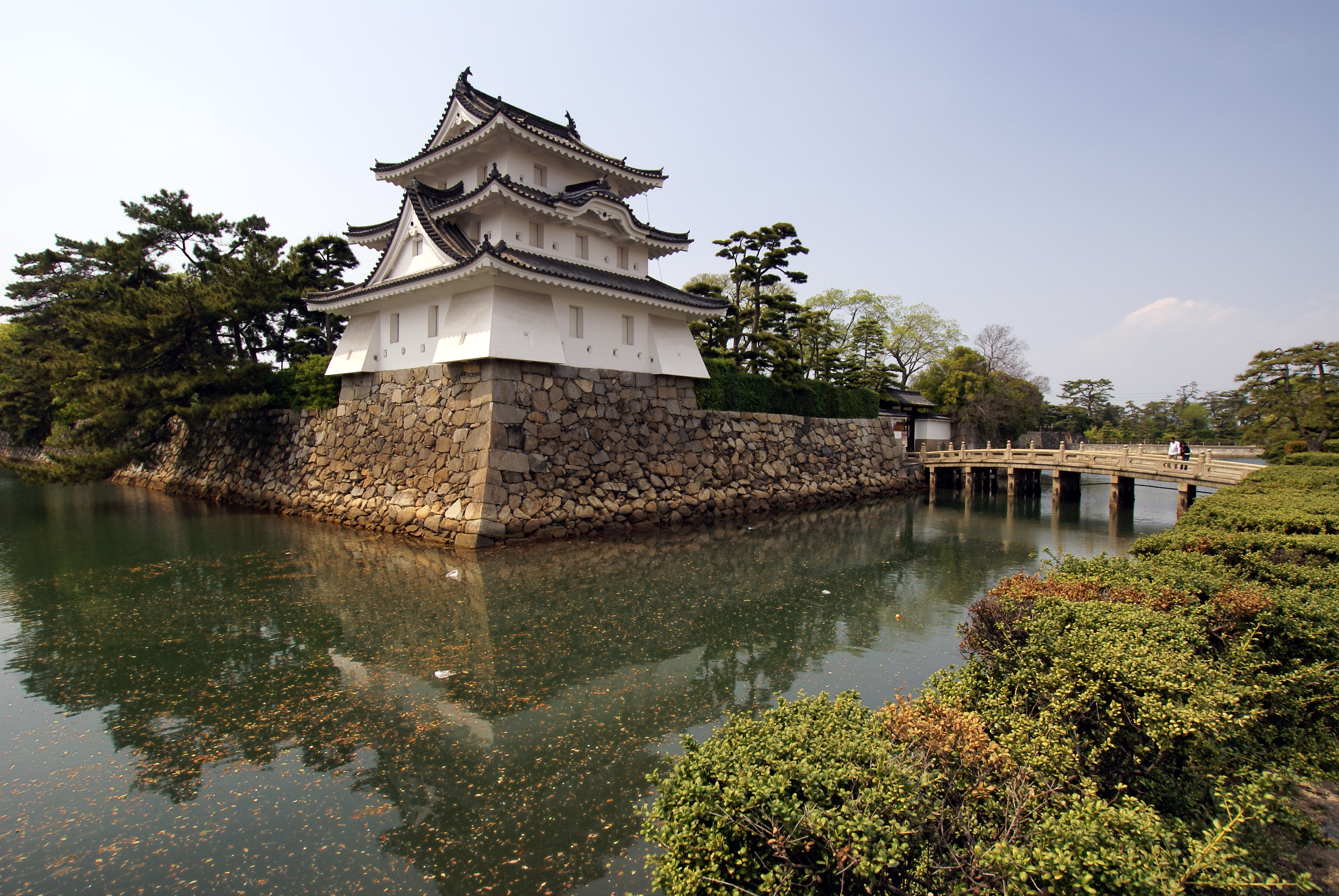
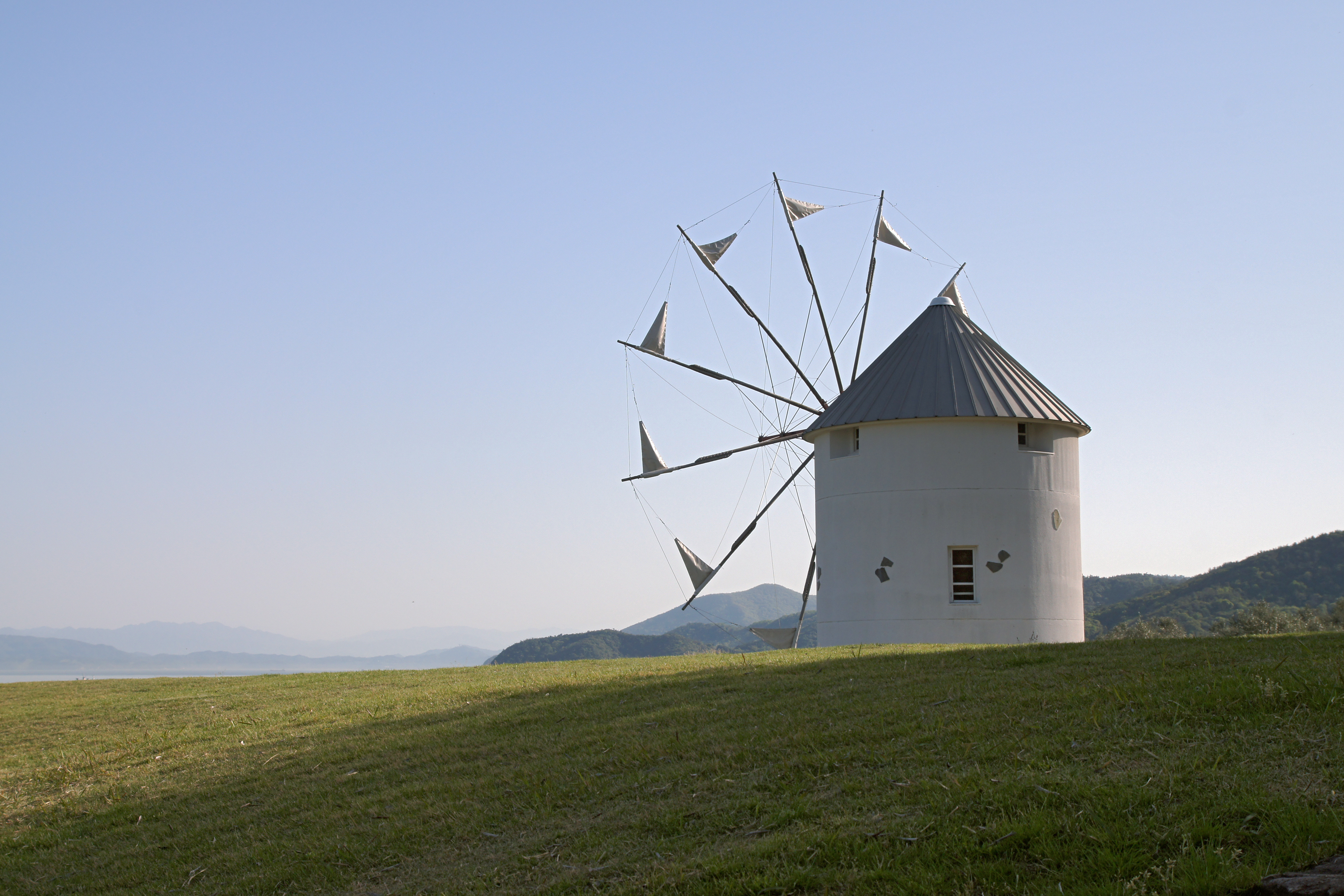
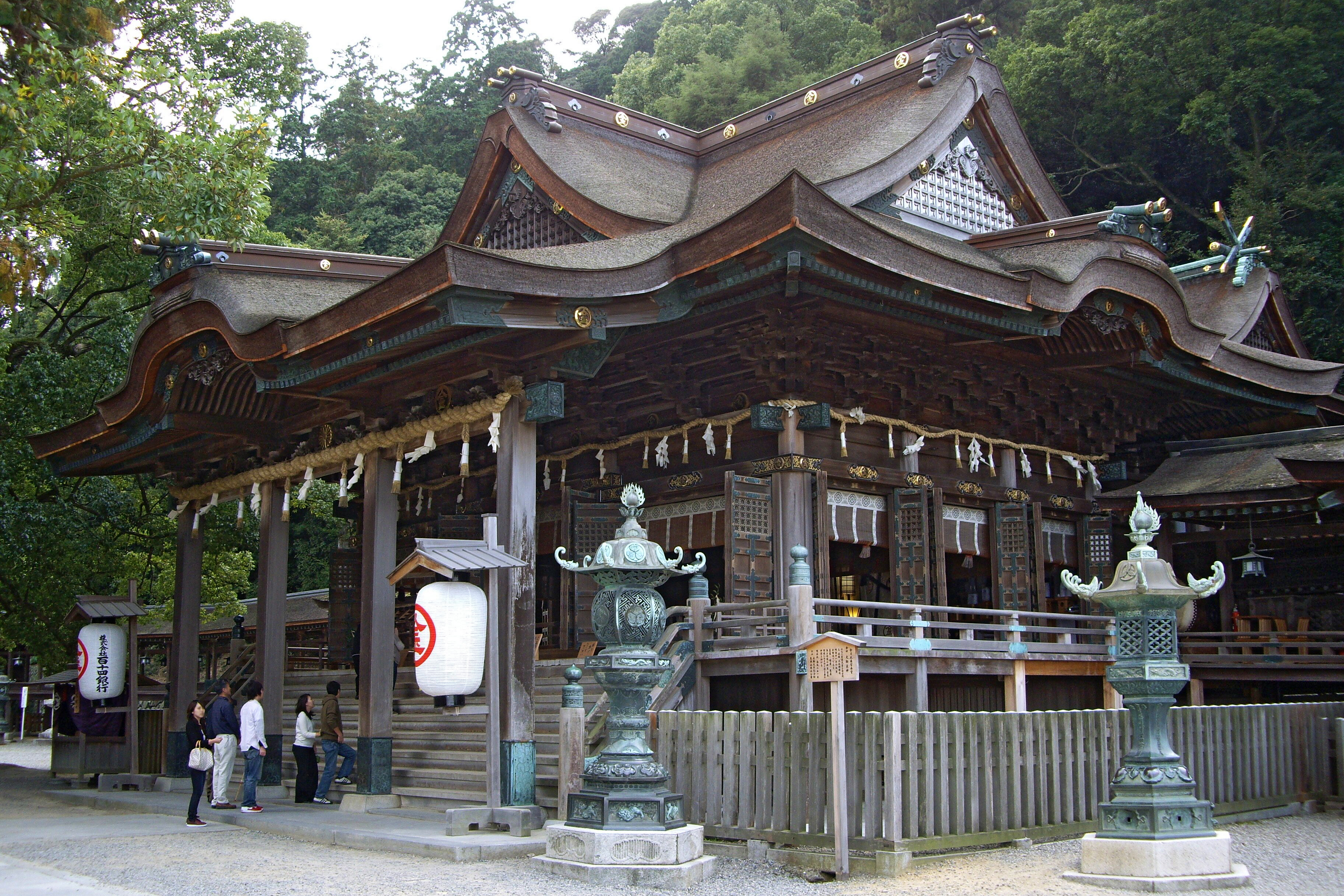
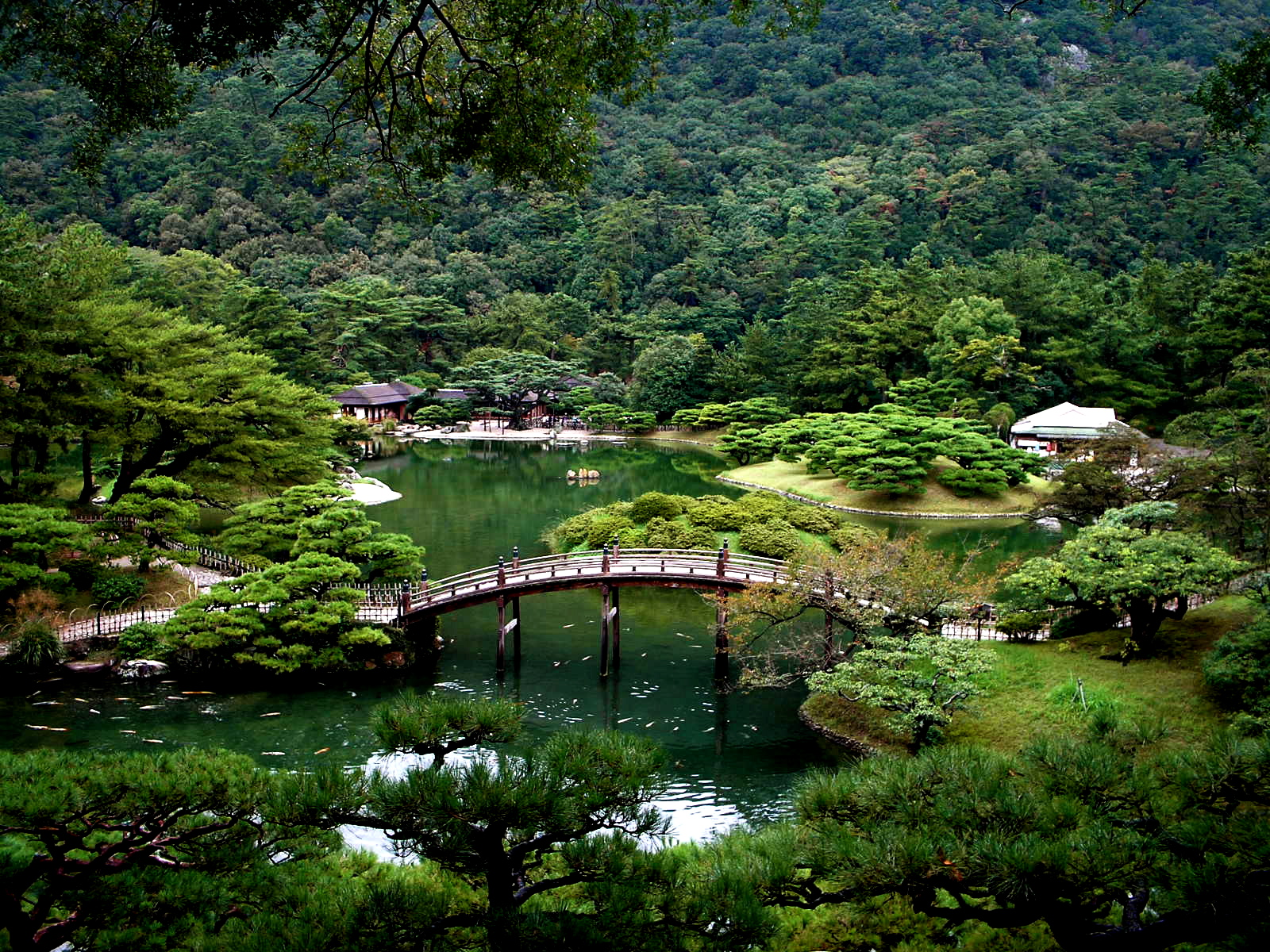
- Great Seto Bridge Sanuki udon Takamatsu Castle Shōdoshima Olive Park Kotohira-gū Ritsurin Garden

- Flag Symbol
- Anthem: Kagawa kenminka
- Country: Japan
- Region: Shikoku
- Island: Shikoku
- Capital: Takamatsu
- Subdivisions: Districts: 5, Municipalities: 17

Government
  - Governor: Toyohito Ikeda

Area (Note: Estimate. Part of boundary between Okayama and Kagawa is undefined.)
  - Total: 1,876.8 km^{2} (724.6 sq mi)
  - Rank: 47th

Population (September 1, 2020)
  - Total: 949,358
  - Rank: 40th
  - Density: 505.84/km^{2} (1,310.1/sq mi)

GDP
  - Total: JP¥3,972 billion US$29.3 billion (2022)
- ISO 3166 code: JP-37
- Website: www.pref.kagawa.lg.jp
- Symbols of Japan
- Bird: Lesser cuckoo (Cuculus poliocephalus)
- Flower: Olive (Olea europaea)
- Tree: Olive (Olea europaea)

Kagawa Prefecture (香川県, Kagawa-ken; Japanese pronunciation: [kä́.ɡä̀.β̞ä̀, -ŋä̀.β̞ä̀, kä̀.ɡä́.β̞ä́.kè̞ɴ̀, -ŋä́.β̞ä́-]) is a prefecture of Japan located on the island of Shikoku. Kagawa Prefecture has a population of 949,358 (as of 2020) and is the smallest prefecture by geographic area at 1,877 square kilometres (725 sq mi). Kagawa Prefecture borders Ehime Prefecture to the southwest and Tokushima Prefecture to the south.

Takamatsu is the capital and largest city of Kagawa Prefecture, with other major cities including Marugame, Mitoyo, and Kan'onji. Kagawa Prefecture is located on the Seto Inland Sea across from Okayama Prefecture on the island of Honshu, which is connected by the Great Seto Bridge. Kagawa Prefecture includes Shōdoshima, the second-largest island in the Seto Inland Sea, and the prefecture's southern land border with Tokushima Prefecture is formed by the Sanuki Mountains.

== History ==
Kagawa was formerly known as Sanuki Province.

For a brief period between August 1876 and December 1888, Kagawa was made a part of Ehime Prefecture.

=== Battle of Yashima ===
Located in Kagawa's capital city, Takamatsu, the mountain of Yashima was the battlefield for one of the best-known struggles between the Heike and Genji clans.

== Geography ==
Kagawa comprises the northeast corner of Shikoku, bordering Ehime Prefecture on the west and Tokushima Prefecture on the south, with a coastline on the Seto Inland Sea facing Okayama Prefecture and the Kansai. The Sanuki Mountains run along the southern border.

Kagawa is currently the smallest prefecture, by area, in Japan. Kagawa is a relatively narrow prefecture located between the mountains of Shikoku and the sea.

As of April 1, 2012, 11% of the total land area of the prefecture was designated as Natural Parks, namely Setonaikai National Park and Ōtaki-Ōkawa Prefectural Natural Park.

=== Cities ===
Map of Kagawa Prefecture. City Town

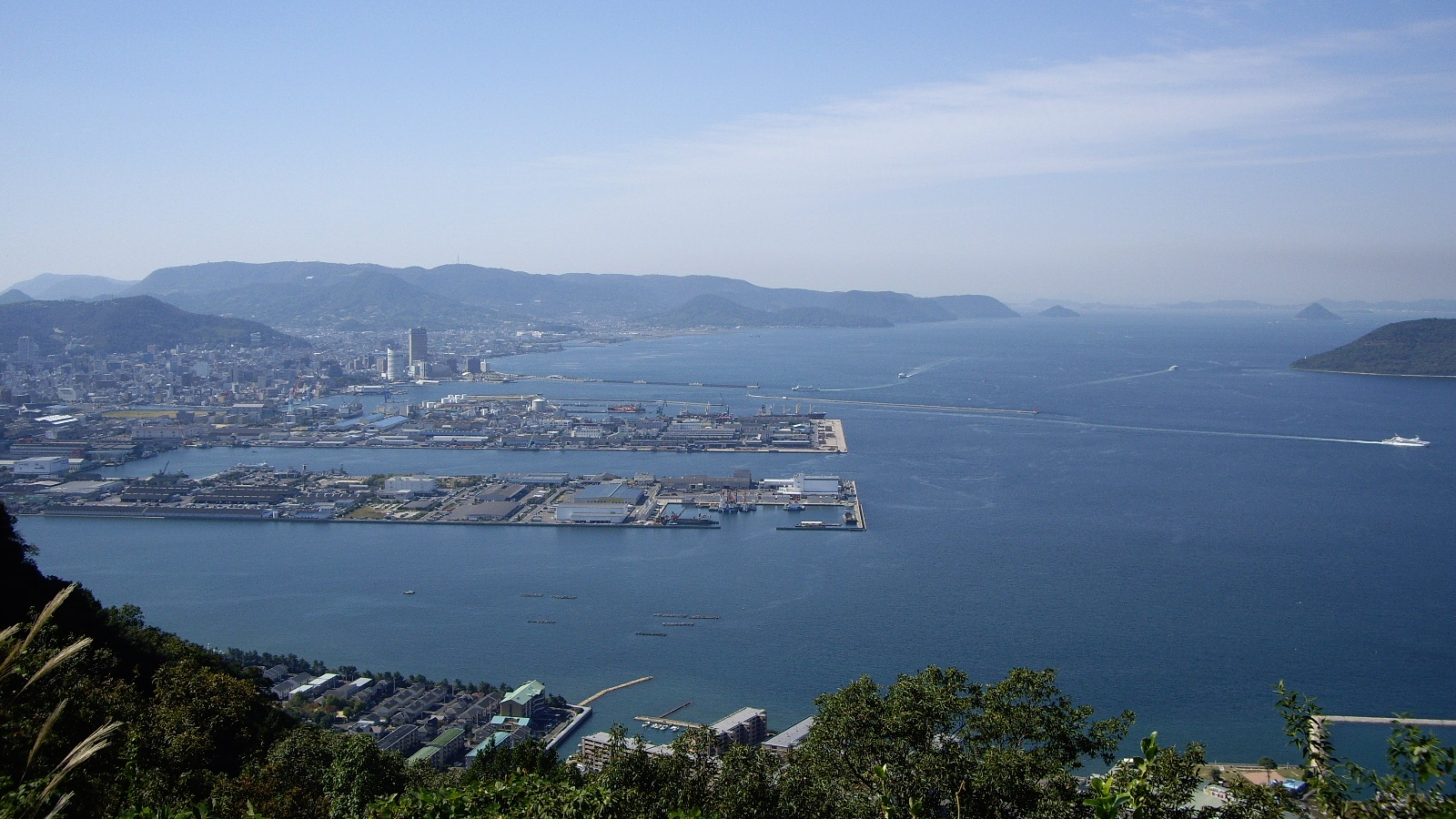
Takamatsu

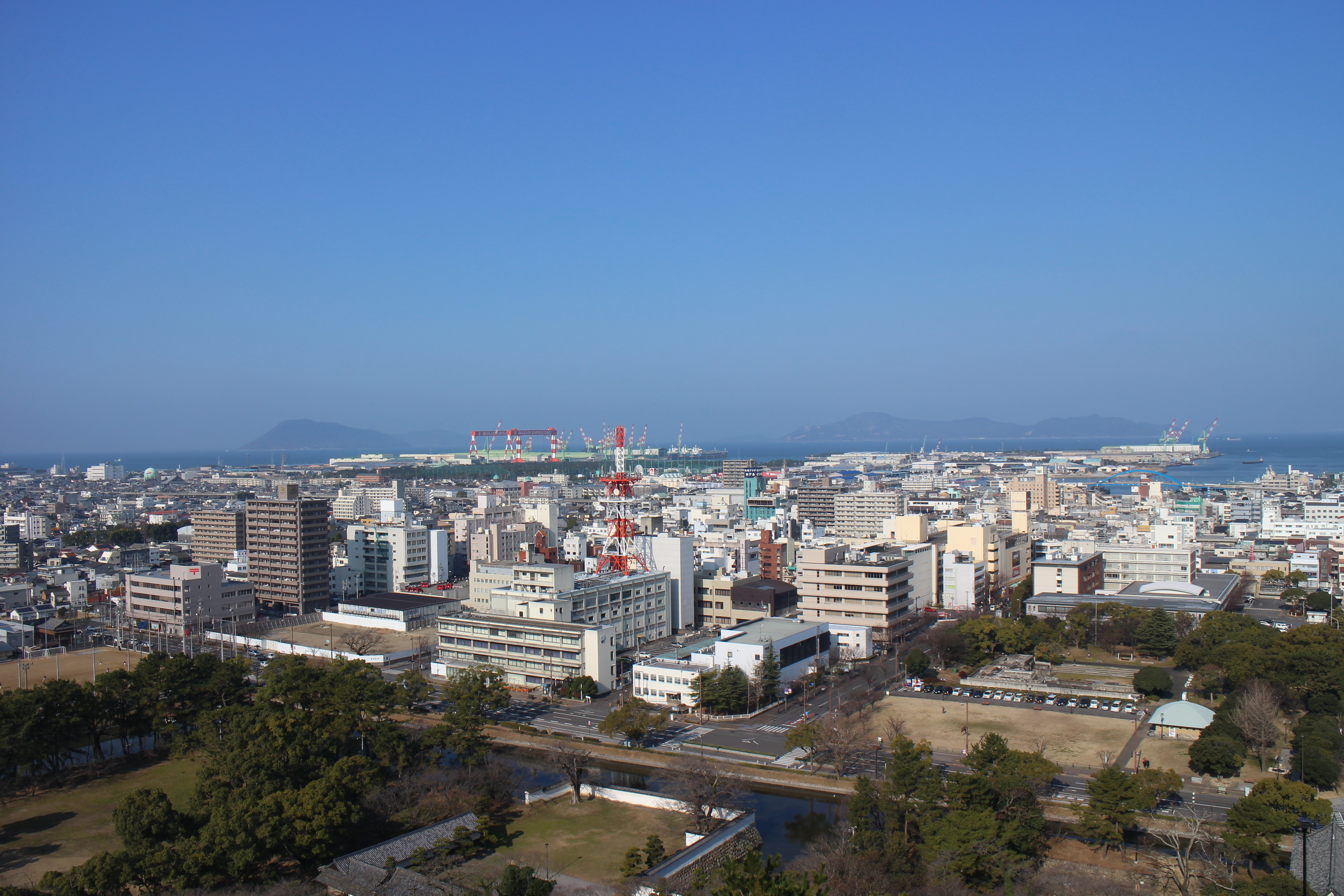
Marugame

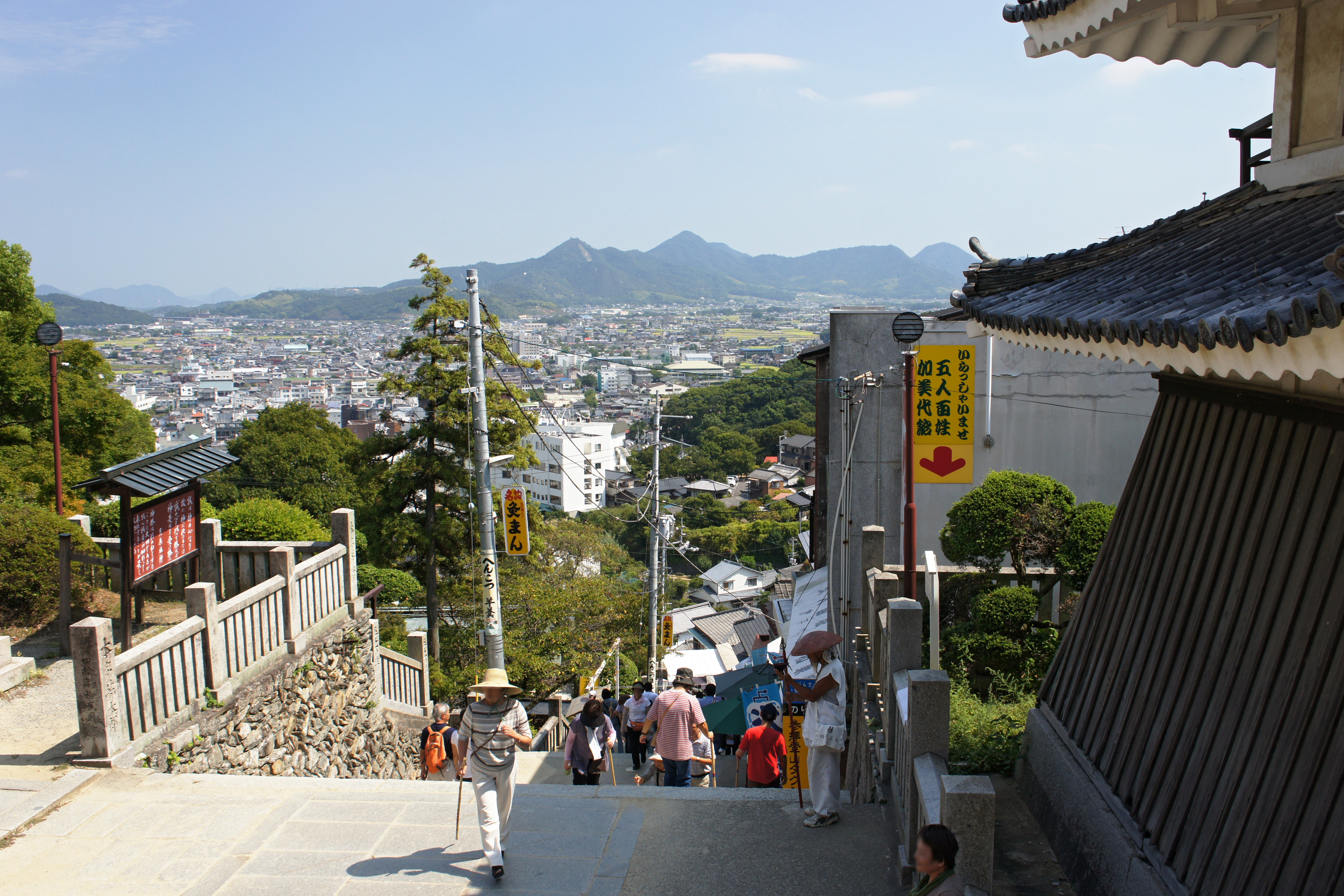
Kotohira

Eight cities are located in Kagawa Prefecture:

Place name		Area (km^{2})	Population (2020)	Map
Rōmaji	Kanji	Area (km^{2})	Population (2020)	Map
Higashikagawa	東かがわ市	152.86	28,305	
Kan'onji	観音寺市	117.83	56,639	
Marugame	丸亀市	111.83	109,165	
Mitoyo	三豊市	222.70	61,839	
Sakaide	坂出市	92.49	50,577	
Sanuki	さぬき市	158.63	46,723	
Takamatsu (capital)	高松市	375.42	417,814	
Zentsūji	善通寺市	39.93	31,620	

=== Towns ===
Kagawa has eight towns organized into five districts. Many were created after 1999 through mergers, as part of a national effort to reduce the number of small towns and villages.

Place name		Area (km^{2})	Population (2020)	District	Map
Rōmaji	Kanji	Area (km^{2})	Population (2020)	District	Map
Ayagawa	綾川町	109.75	22,730	Ayauta	
Kotohira	琴平町	8.47	8,466	Nakatado	
Mannō	まんのう町	194.45	17,324	Nakatado	
Miki	三木町	75.78	26,859	Kita	
Naoshima	直島町	14.22	3,026	Kagawa	
Shōdoshima	小豆島町	95.59	13,646	Shōzu	
Tadotsu	多度津町	24.39	22,813	Nakatado	
Tonoshō	土庄町	74.38	12,915	Shōzu	
Utazu	宇多津町	8.10	18,897	Ayauta	

== Economy ==
Kagawa has a nominal GDP of approximately 3,802 billion yen. Kagawa's major export industries, in order of export value, include transportation equipment, electrical equipment, chemical products, general machinery, mineral fuels, manufactured goods, raw materials, and foodstuff.

== Food ==
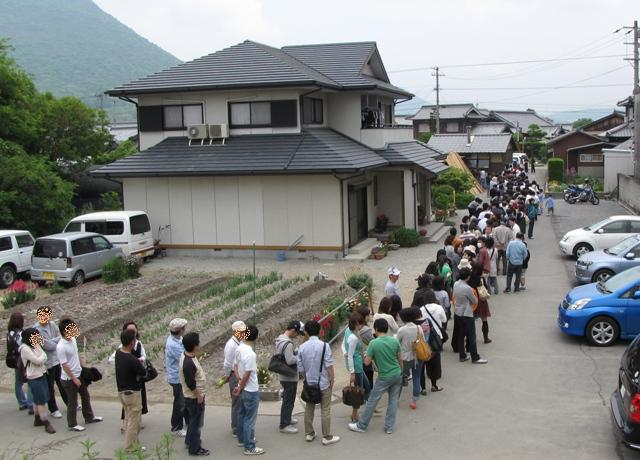
People queuing for udon in Kagawa

Sanuki udon (a type of udon noodle) is the most famous local food of Kagawa Prefecture. In 2008, there were over 700 udon restaurants in this prefecture alone.

Aside from udon, Kagawa is also famous for "hone-tsuki-dori", seasoned chicken thigh cooked on the bone. Originating from Marugame City, the dish has now become a popular dish in izakaya restaurants across the country.

Olives and olive-related products have also come to be recognized as Kagawa foods. As the first place in Japan to successfully cultivate olives, Kagawa has been producing olive-related products since 1908. As well as winning both domestic and international awards for the quality of its olive oil, Kagawa has also created two offshoot food brands from its olive industry - "olive beef" and "olive yellowtail". Waste organic matter from olive pressing is used as feed for cattle and yellowtail amberjack. Due to the high amount of polyphenols in the olive waste, the flesh of the respective meats does not oxidize or lose color easily.

Other local specialties include wasanbon sugar sweets, sōmen noodles and shōyu soy sauce.

== Demographics ==
Kagawa prefecture population pyramid 2020

As of October 2020, Kagawa Prefecture had an estimated population of 950,244. This was 7.1% lower than the population in the 2000 census, being 1,022,890. The area of the prefecture is 1,877 km, and the population density is 506.3/km.

== Education ==
=== Universities ===
- Kagawa Prefectural College of Health Sciences
- Kagawa University in Takamatsu
- Shikoku Gakuin University in Zentsuji
- Tokushima Bunri University in Sanuki
- Takamatsu University

== Sports ==
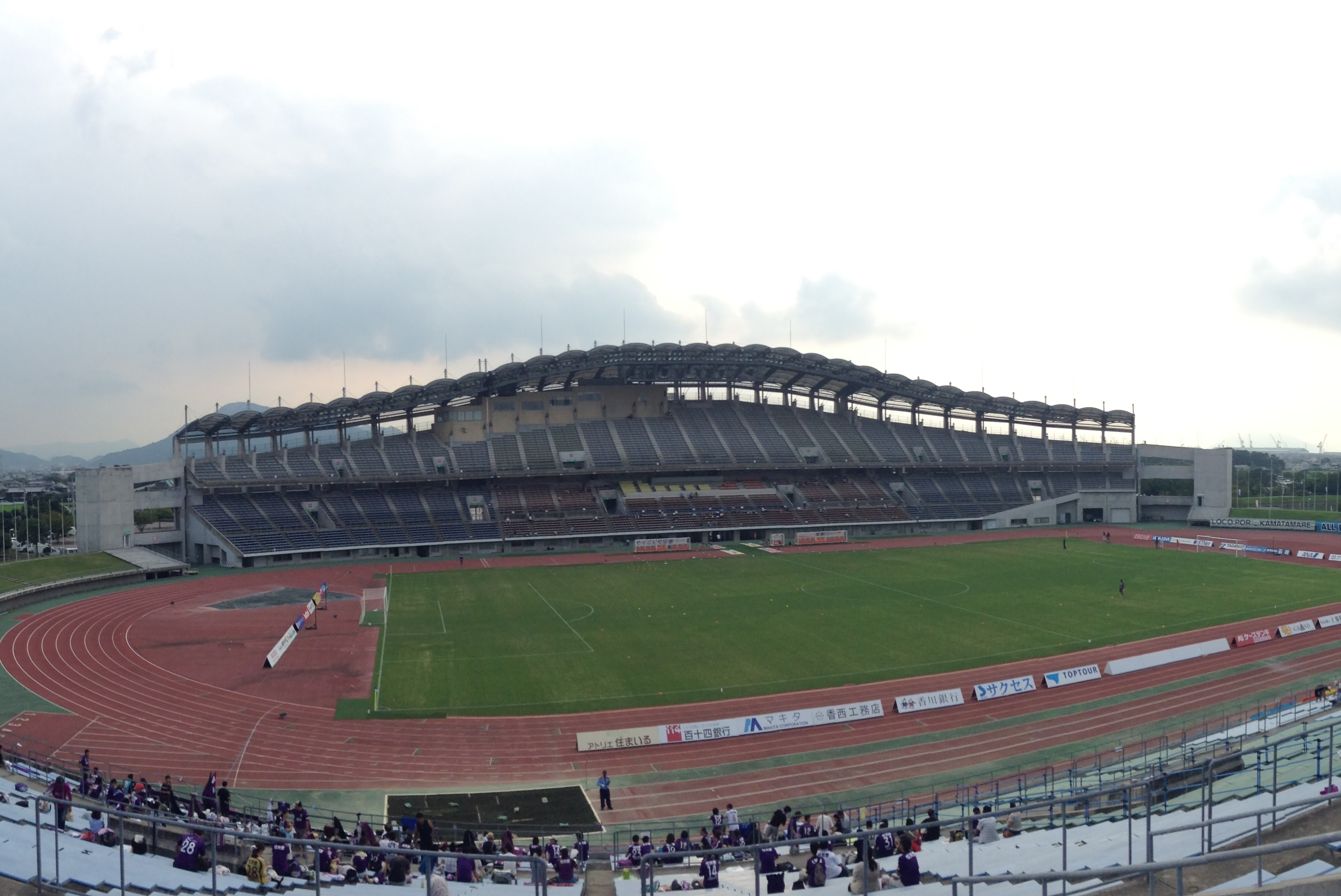
Pikara Stadium in Marugame.

The sports teams listed below are based in Kagawa.

Baseball

- Kagawa Olive Guyners

Basketball

- Kagawa Five Arrows (Takamatsu)

Football (Soccer)

- Kamatamare Sanuki (Takamatsu)

Volleyball

- Shikoku Eighty 8 Queen

Ice Hockey

- Kagawa Ice Fellows (see Japan Ice Hockey Federation)

== Tourism ==
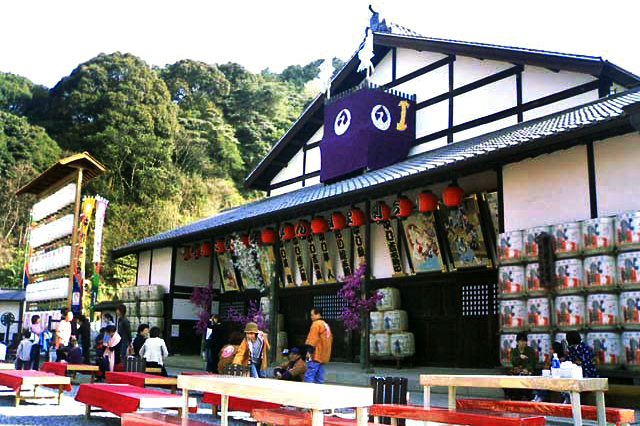
Kanamaruza Kabuki Theatre

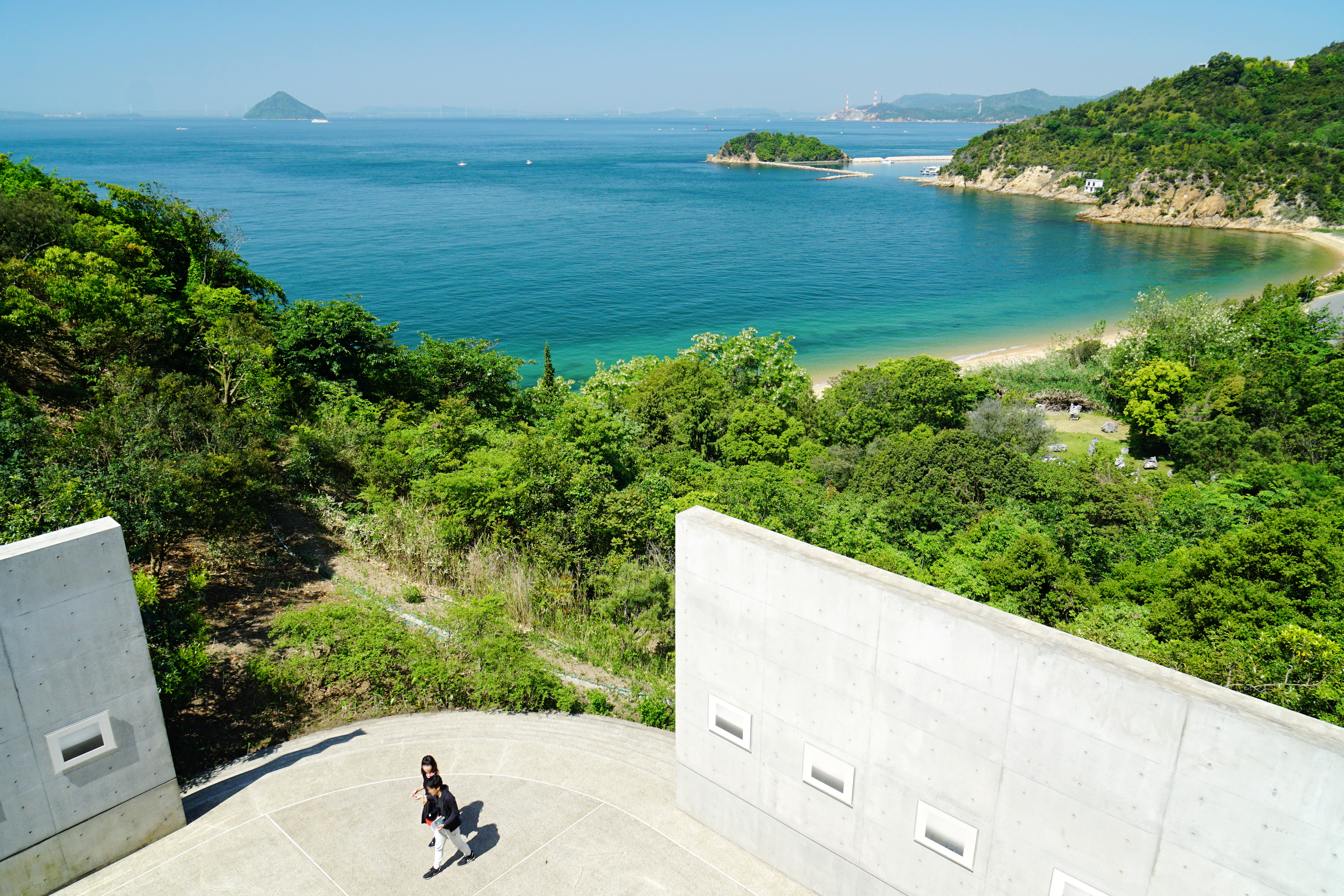
Benesse House, Naoshima

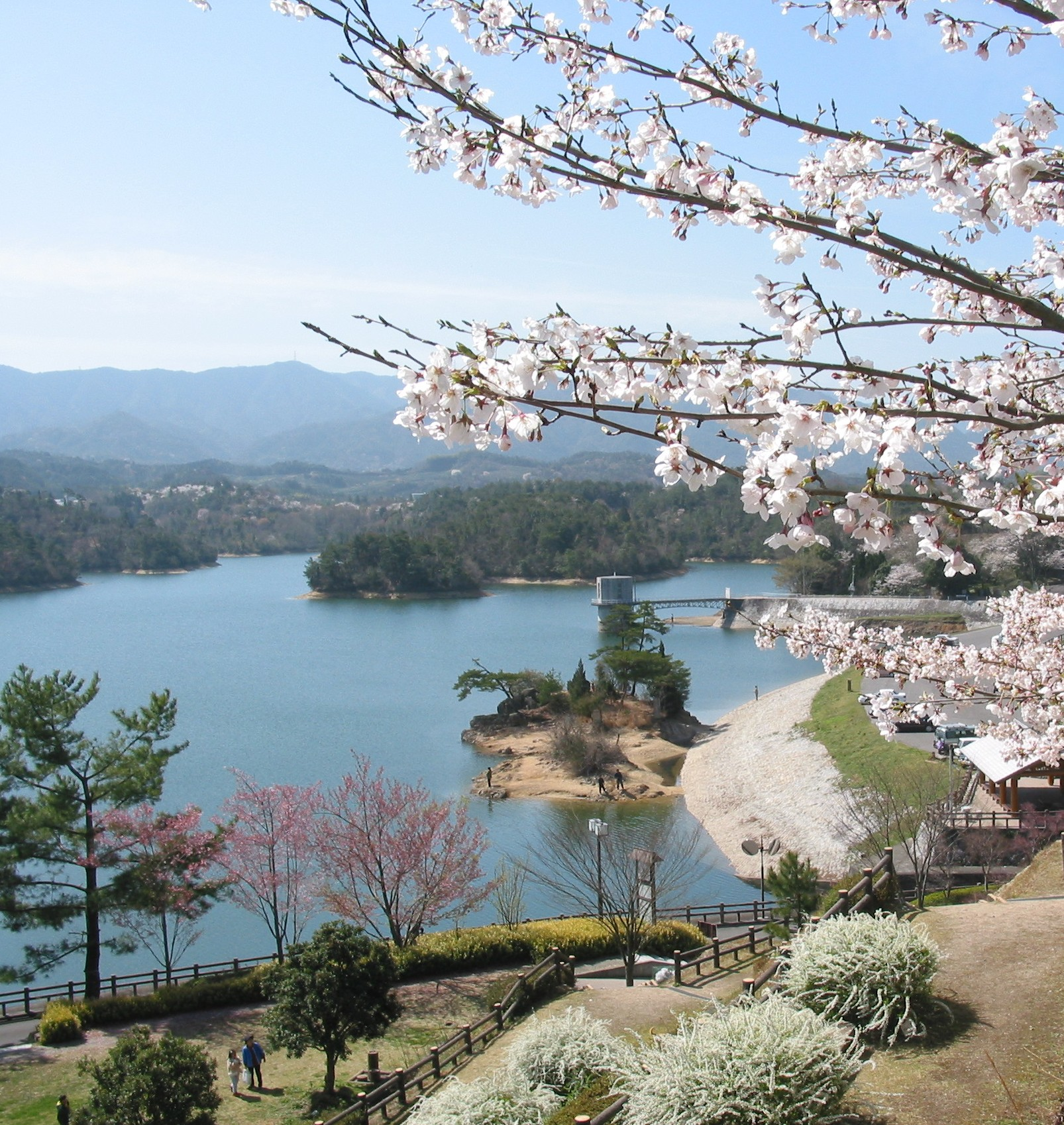
Manno Lake

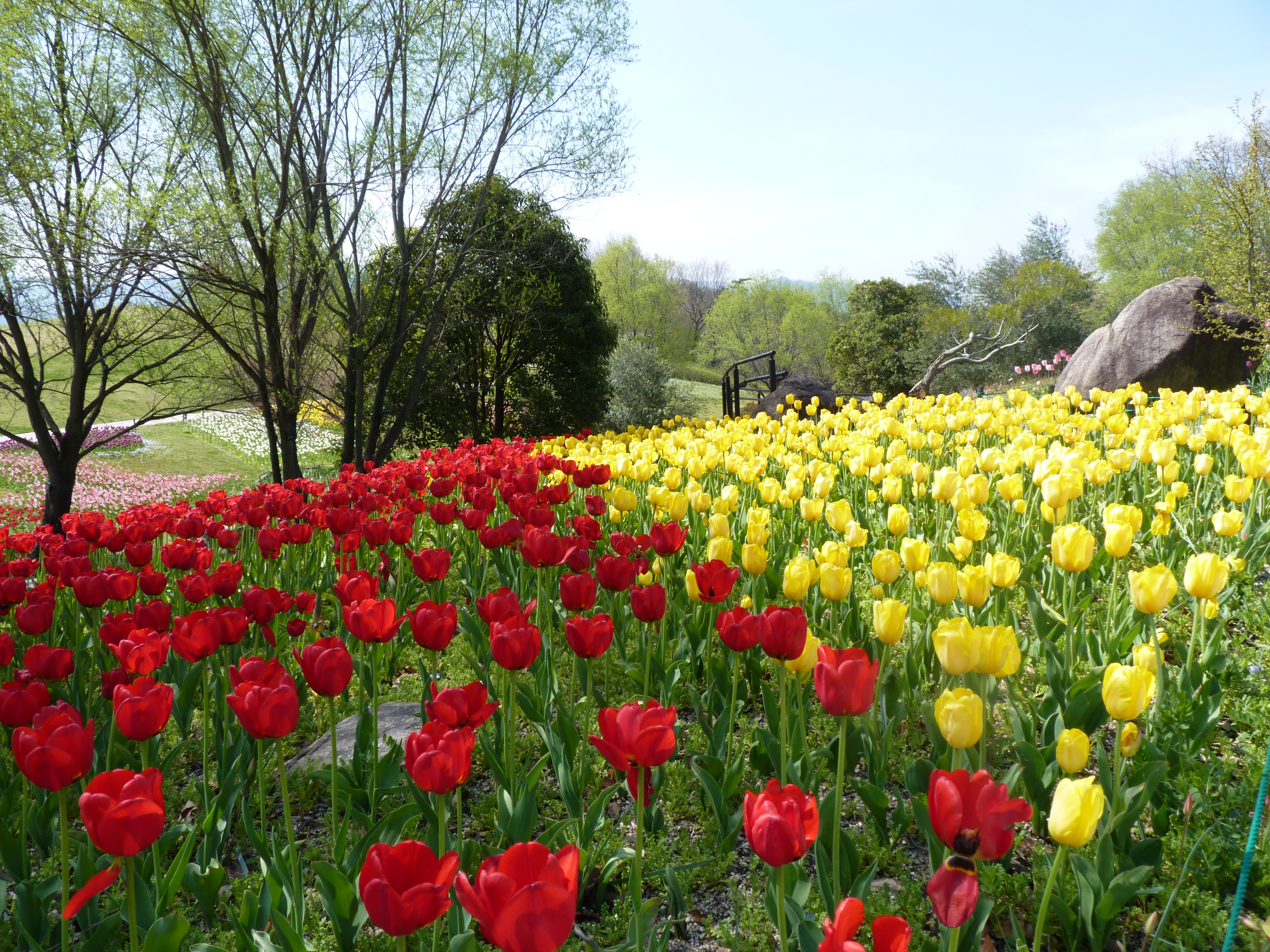
Sanuki Manno National Park

- Kotohira
  - Kanamaruza Kabuki Theatre
  - Konpira Shrine
- Manno
  - Manno Lake
  - Sanuki Manno National Park
- Marugame
  - Marugame Castle
  - Marugame Genichiro-Inokuma Museum of Contemporary Art
- Sakaide
  - Kagawa Prefectural Higashiyama Kaii Setouchi Art Museum (Kaii Higashiyama`s Art Museum)
  - Mount Iino (Kagawa's Mount Fuji)
  - Kiyama (a castle ruins)
  - Shinto shrine (misasagi) (Emperor Sutoku's Tomb)
  - Fuchu Dam
  - Great Seto Bridge
- Mitoyo
  - Chichibugahama Beach
  - Takaya Shrine
- Higashi Kagawa
  - Hiketa Castle - A castle ruin, one of the Continued 100 Fine Castles of Japan in 2017.
- Naoshima Island
  - Ando Museum
  - Benesse House
  - Chichu Art Museum
  - Lee Ufan Museum
- Setonaikai National Park
- Shikoku Pilgrimage – Zentsū-ji, Motoyama-ji, Yashima-ji, etc.

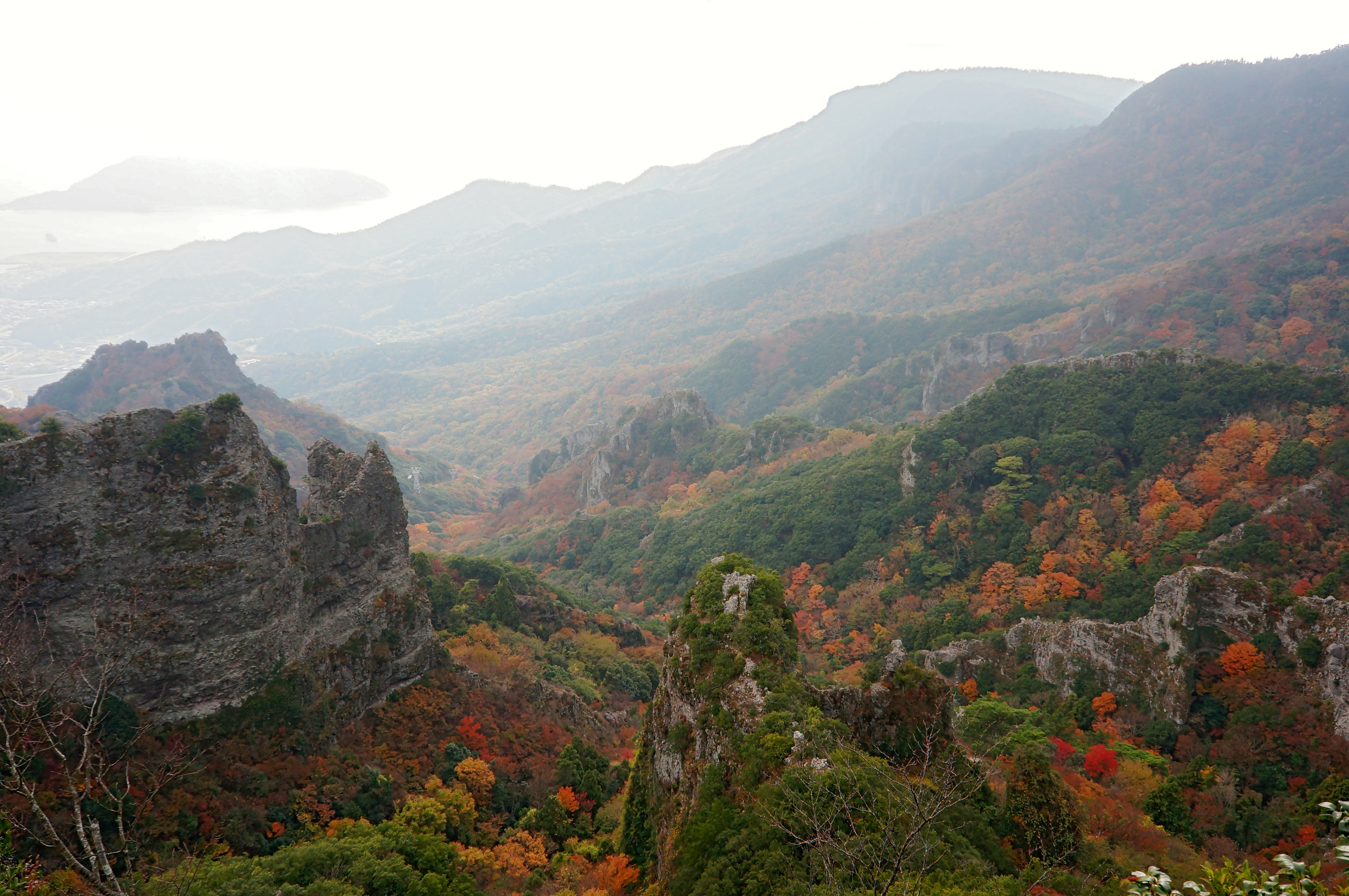
Kankakei

- Shodoshima
  - Kankakei Gorge
  - Shodoshima Olive Park
  - Nakayama Senmaida
- Takamatsu
  - Megijima and Ogijima
  - Ritsurin Garden
  - Takamatsu Castle
  - Yashima, the island on which the Battle of Yashima was fought
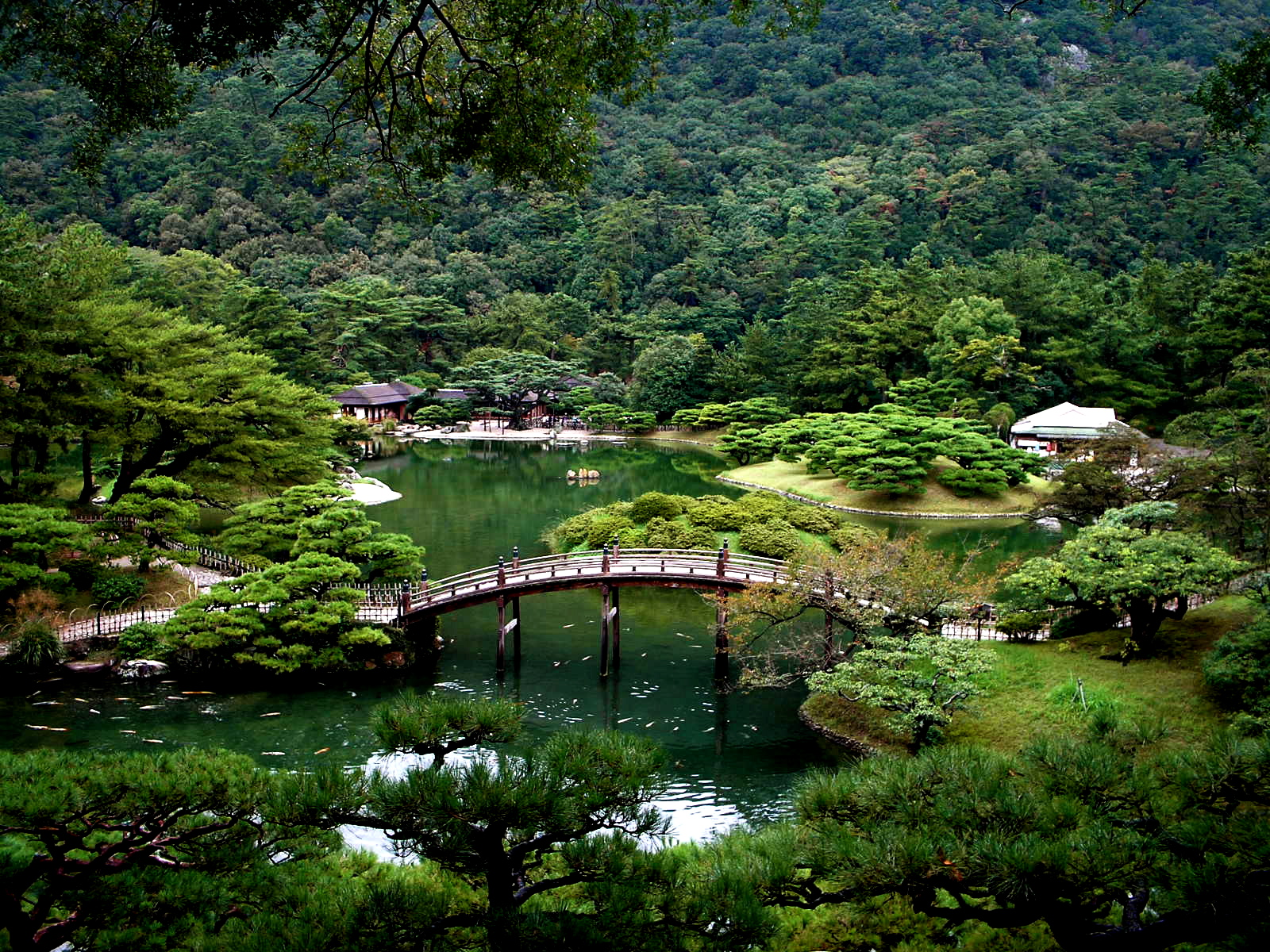
    Ritsurin Garden
- Teshima Island
  - Shima Kitchen
  - Teshima Art Museum
- Kan'onji
  - Kotohiki Park
- Zentsūji
  - Amagiri Castle

== Transportation ==
=== Railroad ===
- JR Shikoku
  - Dosan Line
  - Kotoku Line
  - Seto-Ōhashi Line
  - Yosan Line
- Kotoden (Takamatsu Kotohira Electric Railroad)
  - Kotohira Line
  - Nagao Line
  - Shido Line

=== Bus ===
==== Departure from Takamatsu ====
- Fukuoka
  - Kokura Station
  - Hakata Station
  - Tenjin Station
- Hachioji
- Hiroshima
- Kansai Int'l Airport
- Kōchi
- Kobe
  - Sannomiya
  - Maiko Bus Stop
- Kyoto Station
- Matsuyama
- Nagoya
- Osaka
  - Nanba
  - Umeda
- Shinjuku
- Tokyo Disneyland
- Tokyo Station
- Tokushima
- Yawatahama
- Yokohama

=== Road ===
==== Expressway ====
- Seto-Chūō Expressway
- Takamatsu Expressway
- Matsuyama Expressway

==== National highways ====
- National Route 11 (Tokushima-Takamatsu-Marugame-Niihama-Maysuyama)
- National Route 30
- National Route 32 (Takamatsu-Kotohira-Kochi)
- National Route 193
- National Route 318
- National Route 319
- National Route 377
- National Route 436
- National Route 438

=== Port ===
- Port of Marugame
- Port of Tadotsu
- Port of Takamatsu – Ferry route to Uno, Tonoshō (Shōdoshima Island), Kobe, Naoshima
- Port of Tonoshō – Ferry route to Okayama, Himeji, Kobe and Osaka.

=== Airport ===
- Takamatsu Airport

== In popular culture ==
- Shōdoshima is the setting of the novel Twenty-Four Eyes by Sakae Tsuboi and its subsequent film adaptations.
- In Pom Poko, the tanuki Tamasaburo Onigamori travels to Shikoku to ask the Transformation Masters to come to Tokyo to save Tama Hills from destruction, but he marries and settles there for three years.
- The manga Teasing Master Takagi-san is also set on Shōdoshima, in Tonoshō the native place of the creator, Sōichirō Yamamoto
- The novel Battle Royale by Koushun Takami was set in the fictional town of Shiroiwa ('Castle Rock') in Kagawa Prefecture. Okishima, the fictional island on which much of the novel takes place, is placed in the Seto Inland Sea. The manga also places Shiroiwa in Kagawa, while the film moves Shiroiwa to Kanagawa Prefecture.
- The city of Takamatsu is the main setting of the book Kafka on the Shore by Haruki Murakami.
- Kan'onji is the setting of the early parts of the manga My Bride Is a Mermaid as well as the anime series Yuki Yuna Is a Hero.
- Poco's Udon World is set here.
