= 1899 in poetry =

Take up the White Man's burden,

Send forth the best ye breed —

Go, bind your sons to exile

To serve your captives' need;

— Opening lines of Rudyard Kipling's White Man's Burden, first published this year

This article covers 1899 in poetry.Nationality words link to articles with information on the nation's poetry or literature (for instance, Irish or France).

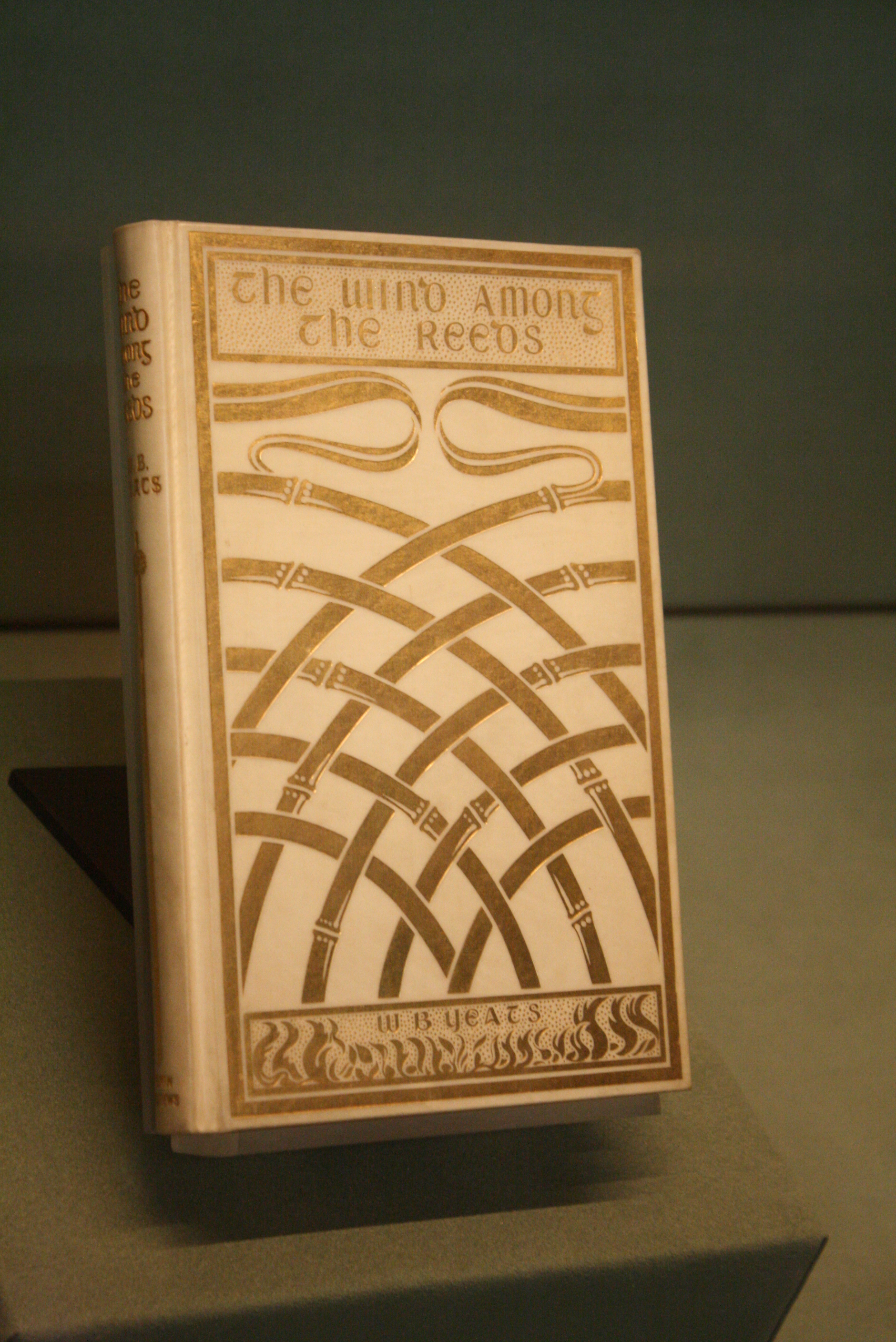

== Events ==
- February 4 – Rudyard Kipling's poem "The White Man's Burden" is first published in The Times. A response to the United States occupation of the Philippine Islands, and exhorting members of the White race to be responsible for benevolent civilising of the world's "non-white" people, the poem is reprinted in The New York Sun the next day.
- March 20 – Welsh "tramp-poet" W. H. Davies loses his foot trying to jump a freight train at Renfrew, Ontario.
- William Hughes Mearns writes "Antigonish" this year; it won't be published until 1922.
- Romesh Chunder Dutt's translation of the Ramayana into English verse is first published, in London.
- Shinshisha ("New Poetry Society") founded by Yosano Tekkan in Japan.

== Works published ==
=== Australia ===
- W. T. Goodge, Hits! Skits! and Jingles!

=== Canada ===
- Frances Jones Bannerman, Milestones. London.
- William Wilfred Campbell, Beyond the Hills of Dream. Boston: Houghton, Mifflin.
- Fidelis, Lays of the "True North," and Other Canadian Poems.
- John Frederic Herbin, The Marshlands
- Archibald Lampman, Alcyone, including "City of the End of Things", the author died while the book was being printed.
- Thomas O'Hagan, Songs of the Settlement
- Frederick George Scott, Poems Old and New (Toronto: William Briggs).
- Francis Sherman, 'The Deserted City: Stray Sonnets. Boston: Copeland and Day.
- Arthur Stringer, The Loom of Destiny.

Anthologies

- Northland Lyrics, William Carman Roberts, Theodore Roberts & Elizabeth Roberts Macdonald; selected and arranged with a prologue by Charles G.D. Roberts and an epilogue by Bliss Carman. Boston: Small, Maynard & Co. ISBN 0-665-12501-1

=== United Kingdom ===
- Hilaire Belloc, A Moral Alphabet
- Laurence Binyon, Second Book of London Visions (see also First Book of London Visions 1896)
- Wilfrid Scawen Blunt, Satan Absolved
- Gordon Bottomley, Poems at White-Nights
- Robert Buchanan, The New Rome: Poems and ballads of our empire
- John Davidson, The Last Ballad, and Other Poems
- Lord Alfred Douglas (anonymously in 1st edition), The City of the Soul
- Ernest Dowson, Decorations: in Verse and Prose
- Rudyard Kipling:
  - "The Absent-Minded Beggar"
  - "The White Man's Burden", appears first in McClure's Magazine in the United States; it is parodied this same year in "The Brown Man's Burden", by Henry Labouchère in Truth, a publication in London; the parody is reprinted in the United States in Literary Digest 18 (February 25)
- Dora Sigerson, Ballads and Poems
- Arthur Symons:
  - Images of Good and Evil
  - The Symbolist Movement in Literature, first collected edition of essays
- W. B. Yeats, The Wind Among the Reeds including "Aedh Wishes for the Cloths of Heaven"; Irish poet published in the United Kingdom, (John Lane/Bodley Head)

=== United States ===
- Stephen Crane, War is Kind
- Paul Laurence Dunbar, Lyrics of the Hearthside, which included his poem "Sympathy"
- Hamlin Gillette, The Trail of the Goldseekers
- Louise Imogen Guiney, The Martyrs' Idyl
- Rudyard Kipling, "The White Man's Burden", appears first in McClure's; it is parodied this same year in "The Brown Man's Burden", by Henry Labouchère in Truth, a publication in London; the parody is reprinted in the United States in Literary Digest 18 (February 25)
- Edwin Markham, The Man with the Hoe and Other Poems
- Howard Llewellyn Swisher, Briar Blossoms: Being a Collection of a Few Verses and Some Prose
- Henry Timrod (died 1867), Complete Poems

=== Other in English ===
- John Le Gay Brereton, Landlopers, mostly prose, based on a walking tour with Dowell Philip O'Reilly; Australia
- W. B. Yeats, The Wind Among the Reeds including "Aedh Wishes for the Cloths of Heaven"; Irish poet published in the United Kingdom, The Wind Among the Reeds, (John Lane/Bodley Head)

== Works published in other languages ==
=== France ===
- Francis Jammes:
  - Le Poète et l'oiseau ("The Poet and the Bird")
  - La Jeune Fille nue, France
- Stéphane Mallarmé (died 1898), Poésies, originally published 1877, new edn with commentary by the poet
- Oscar Milosz, also known as O. V. de L. Milosz, Le Poème des décadences

=== Other languages ===
- José Santos Chocano, La epopeya del Morro, Peru
- Stefan George, Teppich des Lebens ("The Carpet of Life"); German
- Gregorio Martínez Sierra, Diálogos fantásticos ("Fantastic Dialogues"), Spain

== Births ==
Death years link to the corresponding "[year] in poetry" article:

- January 23 – Carlo Betocchi (died 1986), Italian poet
- January 26 – May Miller (died 1995) African American poet, playwright and educator
- February 17 – Jibanananda Das (died 1954), popular Bengali poet
- March 7 – Jun Ishikawa 石川淳 pen name of Ishikawa Kiyoshi, Ishikawa (died 1987), Japanese, Shōwa period modernist author, translator and literary critic
- March 25 – Jacques Audiberti (died 1965), French playwright, poet, novelist and exponent of the Theatre of the Absurd
- March 27 – Francis Ponge (died 1988), French academic, journalist and poet
- May 18 – D. Gwenallt Jones (died 1968), Welsh poet
- May 24
  - Kazi Nazrul Islam (died 1976), Bengali poet and composer best known as the Bidrohi Kobi ("Rebel Poet"), popular among Bengalis and considered the national poet of Bangladesh
  - Henri Michaux (died 1984), Belgian, French-language artist, writer and poet who became a French citizen
- May 27 – Raymond Knister died (1932), Canadian poet, novelist and short story writer
- June 6 – Hildegarde Flanner (died 1987), American poet, author and activist
- June 8 – Kaoru Maruyama 丸山 薫 (died 1974), Japanese
- July 4 – Benjamin Péret (died 1959), French poet and writer
- July 7 – Margaret Larkin (died 1967), American poet
- July 21 – Hart Crane (died 1932), American poet
- August 1 – F. R. Scott (died 1985), Canadian poet, intellectual and constitutional expert
- September 30 – Hendrik Marsman (died 1940), Dutch poet
- August 5 – Sakae Tsuboi 壺井栄 (died 1967), Japanese novelist and poet
- November 19 – Allen Tate (died 1979), American poet and member of the Fugitives and later the Southern Agrarians.
- December 9 – Léonie Adams (died 1988), American poet and Poetry Consultant to the Library of Congress
- Date not known:
  - Jammuneshwar Khataniyar (died 1920), Indian, Assamese-language poet; a woman
  - Dimbeshwar Neog (died 1966), Indian, Assamese-language poet
  - Constance Woodrow (died 1937), English-born Canadian poet

== Deaths ==
Birth years link to the corresponding "[year] in poetry" article:

- February 10 – Archibald Lampman, 37 (born 1861), Canadian poet who dies while his book, Alcyone, is being printed (see "Works", above)
- April 16 – Emilio Jacinto, 23 (born 1875) Filipino revolutionary general and poet, of malaria
- April 26 – Dragotin Kette, 23 (born 1876), Slovene poet, of TB
- July 20 – Frances Laughton Mace, 63 (born 1836) American poet
- November 16 – Vincas Kudirka, 40 (born 1858), Lithuanian physician, poet and national hero, of TB
- November 25 – Robert Lowry, 73 (born 1826), American hymnodist
- December 1 – Dolores Cabrera y Heredia, 71 (born 1828), Spanish Romantic poet and novelist, member of Hermandad Lírica

== See also ==
- 19th century in poetry
- 19th century in literature
- List of years in poetry
- List of years in literature
- Victorian literature
- French literature of the 19th century
- Symbolist poetry
- Young Poland (Młoda Polska) a modernist period in Polish arts and literature, roughly from 1890 to 1918
- Poetry
- Fin de siècle
