= Tread softly =

Tread softly or tread-softly may refer to:

- Cnidoscolus stimulosus, bull nettle or tread-softly, a perennial herb covered with stinging hairs
- Solanum carolinense, Carolina horsenettle or tread-softly, a perennial herbaceous plant with spines
- Tread Softly (1952 film), a British crime film
- Tread Softly (1965 film), or The Violin Case Murders a German thriller
- Tread softly (composition), by Nina C. Young, 2020

== See also ==
- Soft Tread Enterprises, an Australian production company
- "Speak softly and carry a big stick", American President Theodore Roosevelt’s foreign policy
- Tread Softly in This Place, a 1972 novel by Brian Cleeve
- "Tread softly because you tread on my dreams", a line from Yeats' poem "Aedh Wishes for the Cloths of Heaven"
