= Nina C. Young =

American composer

- Born: December 8, 1984 (age 41); Nyack, New York, United States
- Genres: Contemporary classical, electro-acoustic, orchestral, experimental
- Occupations: Composer, sound artist
- Instruments: violin, laptop
- Years active: 2007–present
- Website: www.ninacyoung.com

Nina C. Young (born 1984) is an American electro-acoustic composer of contemporary classical music who resides in New York City. She won the 2015 Rome Prize in musical composition, a 2021 Guggenheim Fellowship, and a 2014 Charles Ives Prize from the American Academy of Arts and Letters.

== Biography ==
Young was born in Nyack, New York, and raised throughout Rockland County. In 2003 she graduated from Clarkstown High School North and then moved to Cambridge, Massachusetts, to study engineering and music at the Massachusetts Institute of Technology. In 2007 Young received two degrees from MIT: a B.S. in ocean engineering and a B.S. in music (studying primarily with Keeril Makan). She continued to work as a research assistant to Tod Machover at the MIT Media Lab. Young attended McGill University's Schulich School of Music from 2008 to 2011, receiving a M.Mus. She studied composition with Sean Ferguson, orchestration with Jean Lesage, and mixed music with Philippe Leroux. While in Montreal, Young worked as a research assistant in CIRMMT's (the Centre for Interdisciplinary Research in Music Media and Technology) Expanded Musical Practice Project and as a studio and teaching assistant at the McGill Digital Composition Studios. Young holds a doctorate in music composition from Columbia University, where she studied with Brad Garton, Georg Friedrich Haas, George Lewis, and Fred Lerdahl. At Columbia, she taught electronic music at the Computer Music Center (CMC).

Young has held residencies at Montalvo Arts Center, the Civitella Ranieri Foundation, and Arts Letters and Numbers.

In 2024, Young was appointed to the composition department faculty effective in the 2024-25 academic year at the Juilliard School in New York City. She previously taught at the Sarah and Ernest Butler School of Music at the University of Texas at Austin, in the Arts Department at the Rensselaer Polytechnic Institute, and at the University of Southern California Thornton School of Music. She has also been a visiting composer at Johns Hopkins University's Peabody Institute.

In addition to her contributions as an educator and composer, Young is a promoter of contemporary music. She served as general manager of the composer collective and publisher APNM (The Association for the Promotion of New Music) from 2011-2015 and is Co-Artistic Director of the new music sinfonietta Ensemble Échappé. Young's music is published by Peermusic Classical.

== Music ==
Young's compositions explore the intersection of instrumental and electroacoustic music.

The Boston Globe has described Young's "John Cage-like boldness in experimentation" and "complex instrumental and electronic soundscapes".

WQXR-FM's Q2 named Young one of the "10 Imagination-Grabbing, Trailblazing Artists of 2014" with contributor Brad Balliett writing, "Nina's music is constantly surprising, but at the same time, seems predestined. Every event seems so well-placed and inevitable that one is left with the feeling that the piece could have gone only the way she has it mapped out. Echoes of Stravinsky and something spectral give way to an intensely personal voice cut through with an ear for color and balance."

== Selected works ==
=== Orchestral ===
- Tread softly (2020) for orchestra
- Out of whose womb came the ice (2020) for baritone voice, orchestra, and electronics
- Agnosco Veteris... (2015) for orchestra
- Fata Morgana (2014) version for orchestra
- Remnants (2012) for orchestra
- Adieu (2009) for orchestra

=== Large ensemble ===
- ...Vestigia Flammae (2014) for 15 musicians
- Fata Morgana (2014) for symphonic brass ensemble
- Traced Upon Cinders (2014) for 13 musicians
- Kashchei (2011) for 9 musicians and electronics

=== Chamber ===
- Touch (2020) for piano four hands
- The Glow that Illuminates, the Glare that Obscures (2019) for brass quintet and electronics
- Tarnish (2019) for saxophone quartet
- Tête-à-Tête (2017) for two toy pianos, video projection, and electronics
- Fleeting Musings and Restless Paise: A Bassoon Pocket Concerto (2015) for solo bassoon and flute, viola, contrabass, and harp
- Rising Tide (2015) for flute, clarinet, percussion, piano, violin, viola, and cello
- Spero Lucem (2015) for piano quartet
- l'heure bleue (2013) for flute and viola
- Meditation (2013) for violin and cello
- Memento Mori - Phase I (2013) for string quartet
- Etched in Sand (2013) for percussion sextet
- Tethered Within (2013) for alto flute, bass clarinet, piano, percussion, 2 violins, viola, cello
- Waltz in Sepia (2013) a theatrical work for violin, viola, and electronics
- Remains (2012) for 2 pianos and 2 percussion
- Kolokol (2010) for 2 pianos and electronics

=== Solo ===
- Mezzanine (2020) for piano
- There had been signs, surely (2020) for violin
- Heart.throb (2019) for solo snare drum and electronics
- If You are... a liar... (2016) for harp
- À bout de souffle (2016) for piano scordatura
- Ainsi soit-il (2016) for cello
- Temenos (2016) for violin and electronics
- Metal Works (2014) for piano and electronics
- Sun Propeller (2012) for violin and electronics (2017, for version for viola)
- Chatter (2011) for trumpet and electronics

=== Vocal ===
- Swan Song (2018) for soprano and piano
- Prelude (2015) from Making Tellus: An Opera for the Anthropocene for bass voice, piano, and contrabass
- Out of whose womb came the ice, Parts 1&2 (2017, 2020) for baritone voice, orchestra, and electronics
- Void (2015) for soprano, viola, and piano
- Not Waving But Drowning (2009) for viola, piano and mixed choir

=== Electronic ===
- drink rain (2021)
- present perfect (2020)
- Torsion Series (2019)
- Fool's paradise 2.0 (2019)
- Fool's paradise (2018)
- Sol (2016)
- Mark As Unsent (2015)
- Bayu-bayu (2011)
- Incubus (2010)

== Selected awards and grants ==
- 2021 Guggenheim Fellowship in Music Composition
- 2015 Koussevitsky Music Foundation Commission
- 2015 Rome Prize, The American Academy in Rome, Italy
- 2015 American Composers Forum National Composition Contest, wild Up ensemble commission
- 2014 Aspen Music Festival Jacob Druckman Prize, orchestral commission
- 2014 Nouvel Ensemble Moderne's 12th International Forum, Montreal, QC
- 2014 Charles Ives Prize (Charles Ives Scholarship) American Academy of Arts and Letters
- 2014 Salvatore Martirano Memorial Composition Award (Traced Upon Cinders)
- 2014 Milwaukee Symphony Orchestra Composer Institute
- 2014 Libby Larsen Prize (Remnants) from the International Alliance for Women in Music.
- 2013 American Composers Orchestra Underwood New Music Readings (Remnants) Audience Choice Award
- 2011 Pauline Oliveros Prize (Kolokol) from the International Alliance for Women in Music.
- 2011 17th International Young Composers Meeting with the Orkest de ereprijs.
- 2010 BMI Foundation Student Composer Award (Kolokol)
