= University of Texas Longhorn Band =

College marching band in Austin, Texas

Longhorn Band
- Nickname: Showband of the Southwest
- School: University of Texas at Austin
- Location: Austin, Texas
- Conference: SEC
- Founded: 1900
- Director: Dr. Cliff Croomes
- Associate Director: Dr. Marc Sosnowchik
- Assistant Directors: Dr. Mike Lebrias and T.J. Anderson
- Members: 420
- Rehearsal space: Longhorn Band Hall; Music Building and Recital Hall
- Practice field: "The Bubble"
- Fight song: "Texas Fight"

Uniform
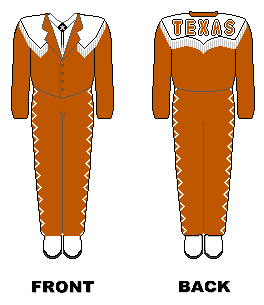
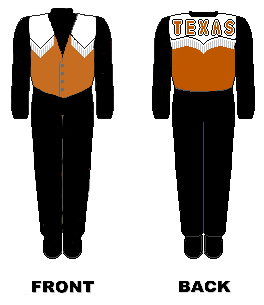
- The standard Uniform of the Longhorn Band Uniform of the Texas Silks
- Website: sites.utexas.edu/longhornband/

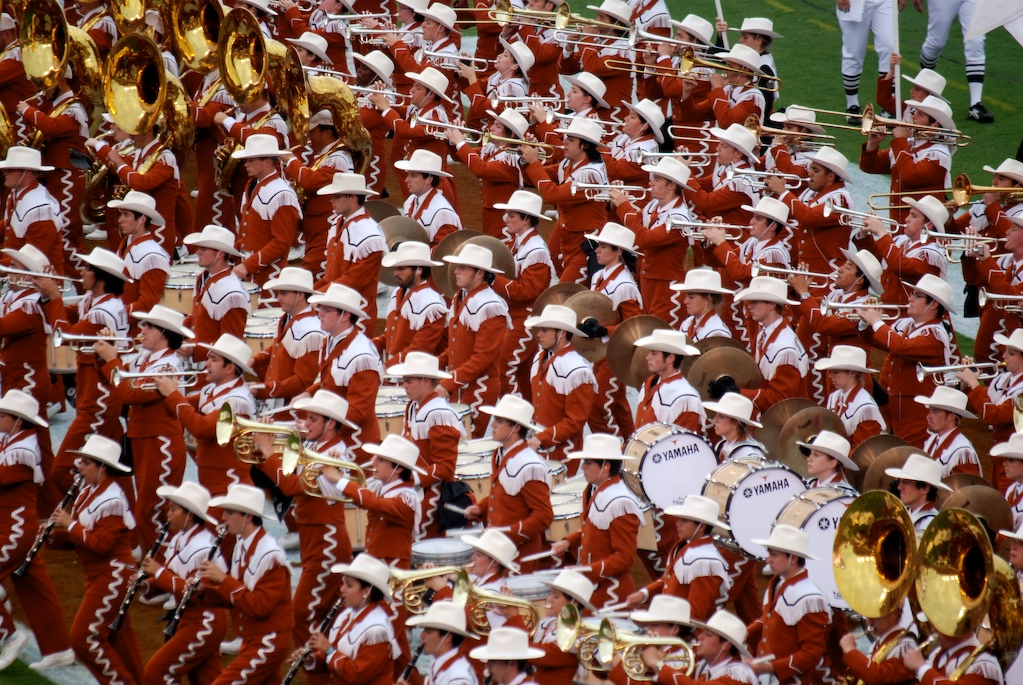
The Longhorn Band on the field at a football game vs Baylor in 2006

The Longhorn Band's characteristic uniform

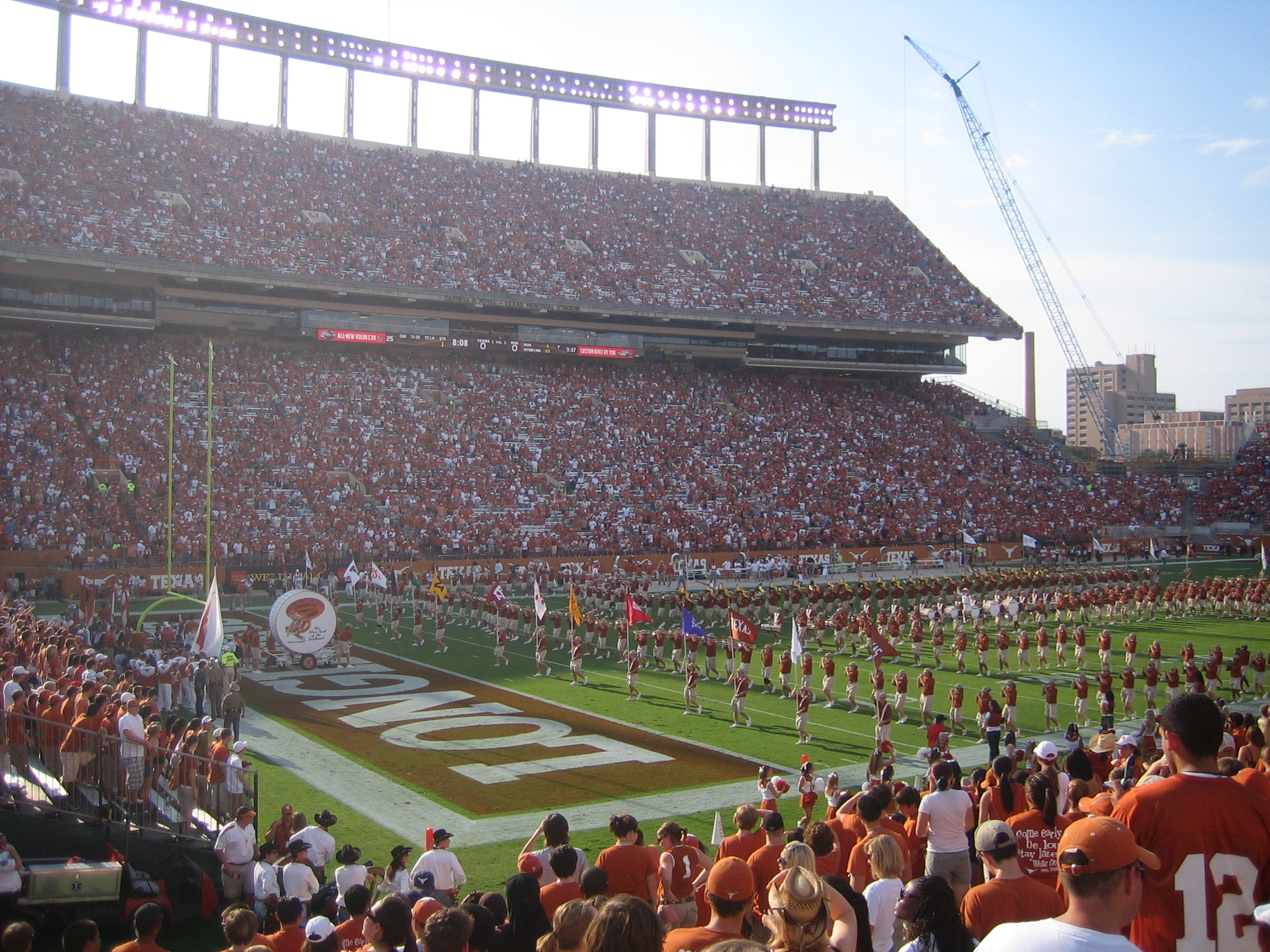
The Showband of the Southwest performs at Darrell K. Royal-Texas Memorial Stadium in 2007

The University of Texas Longhorn Band (LHB), also known as the Showband of the Southwest, is the marching band of The University of Texas at Austin. The Longhorn Band was founded in 1900 by distinguished professor of chemistry, Dr. Eugene P. Schoch. The band is currently under the direction of Dr. Cliff Croomes. The band performs at all in-state football games, for various Texas Longhorn Athletics teams, and at special pep rallies and parades throughout the year. The band includes about 425 students, all of whom must register for a year-round course offered by the Sarah and Ernest Butler School of Music.

The Longhorn Band has received prestigious honors, such as the Sudler Trophy, in 1986 and performed at many notable occasions, including Super Bowl VIII and the inaugural parades of five presidents: John F. Kennedy, Lyndon B. Johnson, Ronald Reagan, George H. W. Bush, and George W. Bush.

== History ==
=== Founding and early years (1900–1955) ===
The Longhorn Band was founded in 1900 by distinguished professor of chemistry, Dr. Eugene P. Schoch. With Dr. H. E. Baxter, the first director of the Longhorn Band, they purchased $150 worth of instruments from a local pawn shop and recruited 16 students to make up the band. Dr. Baxter served as the director for five years before stepping aside, after which Dr. Schoch took full control of the band. Dr. Schoch stepped down as director after five years, but continued to serve as a chaperone for the band. For the next seven years, the Longhorn Band was run by students.

In 1921, Mr. Burnett "Blondie" Pharr became the director of the Longhorn Band. Pharr developed the young band and led it on a tour through 17 states, performing at the Chicago World's Fair, Madison Square Garden, and Washington, D.C. Colonel George E. Hurt became director in 1936. Under his tenure, the Longhorn Band grew to over 200 members. After Col. Hurt suffered a stroke in 1949, Moton Crockett assumed the directorship of the Longhorn Band. In his final year as director, Mr. Crockett oversaw the purchase of the large bass drum that is today known as Big Bertha and affectionately called the "Sweetheart of the Longhorn Band". Big Bertha was purchased from the University of Chicago for $1. The drum had sat in storage in the school's stadium after UChicago disbanded their varsity football program. Big Bertha was radioactively contaminated by testing for the Manhattan Project that occurred at the stadium.

=== Vincent R. DiNino era (1955–1975) ===
In 1955, Vincent R. DiNino was hired as the director of the Longhorn Band. He is credited with shaping the band into the organization it is today. DiNino's time as director saw the introduction of many traditions and characteristics of the band, such as the western-style uniforms, Big Flags Brigade, the Longhorn Alumni Band, and cowbells. DiNino oversaw the introduction of women into the band in a position besides majorette in 1956 and the integration of the band in 1962. The adoption of the moniker "Showband of the Southwest" also occurred during this time.

Under the direction of Mr. DiNino, the Longhorn Band performed in the inaugural parades of Presidents John F. Kennedy and Lyndon B. Johnson.

=== Late 20th century (1975–2001) ===
Tom C. Rhodes served as director of the band from 1975 to 1980. Glenn A. Richter, an alumnus of the University of Texas, returned to his alma mater as director of the Longhorn Band from 1980 to 1995. Paula Crider became director in 1995 and remained until 1999. Kevin Sedatole served as director for the short span from 1999 to 2001.

=== Present day (2001–present) ===
The Longhorn Band at Circuit of the Americas prior to the start of the 2026 United States Grand Prix

Dr. Robert Carnochan assumed the directorship of the Longhorn Band in 2001. He served as director until 2015, leaving the Longhorn Band for a position as the Director of Bands at the University of Miami.

Dr. Scott Hanna became the 14th director of the Longhorn Band in 2015. Dr. Hanna had served as the associate director of the band for the sixteen years prior to his appointment as director.

In May 2021, Dr. Hanna announced his retirement, effective May 31. Dr. Cliff Croomes, then assistant director of bands at Louisiana State University was chosen to succeed as the 15th director of the Longhorn Band and the first Black director. Dr. Croomes graduated with his Bachelor of Music from the UT Butler School of Music in 2001 and is a former member of the Longhorn Band.

=== Directors ===
Years	Name
1900–1905	Dr. H. E. Baxter
1905–1910	Dr. Eugene P. Schoch
1910–1911	None identified
1911–1915	Walter S. Hunnicutt
1915–1917	Raymond Myers
1917–1918	H. H. Hudson
1919–1920	Leon C. Stanley
1921	Sidney P. Chandler
1921–1936	Burnett "Blondie" Pharr
1936–1949	Col. George E. Hurt
1949–1955	Moton H. Crockett, Jr.
1955–1975	Vincent R. DiNino
1975–1980	Tom C. Rhodes
1980–1995	Glenn A. Richter
1995–1999	Paula Crider
1999–2001	Kevin Sedatole
2001–2015	Dr. Robert Carnochan
2015–2021	Dr. Scott Hanna
2021–present	Dr. Cliff Croomes

=== Drum Majors, Presidents, and Twirlers ===
Year	Drum Major	Band President	Feature Twirlers
1900–1902	No Record		
1902–1904	Walker Stephens	No Record	
1904–1919	No Record	No Record	
1919–1920	No Record	Leon C. Stanley	
1920–1922	No Record	D.T. Stafford	
1922–1923	No Record	J.M. Maloney	
1923–1924	Harold Broome	Royal Calder	
1924–1926	No Record		
1926–1927	Allan C. Steere	G.A. Toepperweir	
1927–1928	Allan C. Steere	Carl L. Olsen	
1928–1929	Allan C. Steere	W.R. Moyers	
1929–1930	Allan C. Steere	Weldon Fielder	
1930–1931	Allan C. Steere	Fred B. Becker	
1931–1932	Neal Owen	Fred B. Becker	
1932–1933	Neal Owen	Ben A. Parkinson	
1933–1934	Neal Owen	Millard Shaw, Jr.	
1934–1935	Neal Owen	Jack Dulliam	
1935–1936	Charles Daniel	Aubrey Fielder	
1936–1937	Charles Daniel	No Record	
1937–1938	Charles Daniel	Maurice Hoffman	
1938–1939	Charles Daniel	John C. Dunlop	
1939–1940	Curtis Popham	Basil Bell	
1940–1941	Curtis Popham	George P. Blevins, Jr.	Becky Havens
1941–1942	Curtis Popham	James B. Newman	No Record
1942–1943	Curtis Popham		No Record
1943–1944	Moton H. Crockett, Jr.	Phil Rogers	No Record
1944–1945	Moton H. Crockett, Jr.	Tom L. Robinson	No Record
1945–1946	Moton H. Crockett, Jr.	Pat M. Baskin	No Record
1946–1947	James R. Underwood, Jr.	Moton H. Crockett, Jr.	No Record
1947–1948	James R. Underwood, Jr.	C. Dewey Crowder, Jr.	Justine Havens
1948–1949	Pete Schram	William F. Needham, Jr.	No Record
1949–1950	Fred A. Steffey, Jr.	Norman L. Kiefer	No Record
1950–1951	Fred A. Steffey, Jr.	Frederick Edmond Lewis	No Record
1951–1952	Hal W. Atkins	I. Field Roebuck, Jr.	No Record
1952–1953	Hal W. Atkins	Wallace Leon Swenson	No Record
1953–1954	Jacky P. Gilbert	C.C. Crutchfield, Jr.	No Record
1954–1955	Jacky P. Gilbert	Sims Allen Buckley	Margaret Ann Smith
1955–1956	Jacky P. Gilbert	Bobby Daffern	Elizabeth Ann Mullenix
1956–1957	Edward Robertson; Hewlett	Bill Whited	Elizabeth Ann Mullenix; Shirley Snipes Hewlett
1957–1958	Edward Robertson; Hewlett	Fred Anderson	Elizabeth Ann Mullenix; Shirley Snipes Hewlett
1958–1959	Edward Robertson; Hewlett	Jay Don Gensler	Shirley Snipes Hewlett
1959–1960	Edward Robertson; Hewlett	Arnold Birdsong	Shirley Snipes Hewlett
1960–1961	Edward Robertson; Hewlett	Robert Foster	B. Carolyn Porter; Irene Reeb Meitzen
1961–1962	Edward Robertson; Hewlett	Budge Mabry	B. Carolyn Porter; Irene Reeb Meitzen
1962–1963	Bobby Don Hart	Kenneth Nietenhoeffer	B. Carolyn Porter; Irene Reeb Meitzen; Carolyn Jane Swerk; Carol Reeb Nietenhofer
1963–1964	Bobby Don Hart	Michael D. Sandgarten	B. Carolyn Porter; Irene Reeb Meitzen; Carol Reeb Nietenhofer; Mimi Jansen
1964–1965	Bobby Don Hart	Bruce A. Kowert	Carol Reeb Nietenhofer; Mimi Jansen
1965–1966	Bobby Don Hart	Newman Smith	Carol Reeb Nietenhofer
1966–1967	Bobby Don Hart	Tommy Neal Cowan	Lynn Kohlenberg
1967–1968	Dick Robinson	Richard Coan Robinson	Lynn Kohlenberg
1968–1969	Dick Robinson	Malcolm Nelson	Lynn Kohlenberg; Carla Feuerbacher
1969–1970	Tom Waggoner	Gordon Middleton	Lynn Kohlenberg; Carla Feuerbacher
1970–1971	Tom Waggoner	Glenn Richter	Carla Feuerbacher
1971–1972	Steve Rode	Steve Rich	Carla Feuerbacher; Debora Jo Porter
1972–1973	Scott Harmon		Debora Jo Porter; Deborah Lee Kirkham
1973–1974	Scott Harmon	Lane Littrell	Adana Teresa Willman; Nancy Crosby Elliott
1974–1975	Eric Hagstette	Randy Roundtree	Adana Teresa Willman; Nancy Crosby Elliott
1975–1976	Eric Hagstette	Mike Figer	Adana Teresa Willman; Nancy Crosby Elliott
1976–1977	Eric Hagstette	Michael McFarland	Adana Teresa Willman; Nancy Crosby Elliott; Janice Crosby Stone
1977–1978	Sam Carr	Ken Crone	Diedra Dodson; Dore Tubbs; Lynn Dell Harrell; Janice Crosby Stone
1978–1979	Gary Myers	John Berry	Diedra Dodson; Dore Tubbs; Lynn Dell Harrell; Janice Crosby Stone
1979–1980	Paul Scott Patterson	Billy Haehnel	Diedra Dodson; Dore Tubbs; Lynn Dell Harrell; Dawn Dodson
1980–1981	Scott Cherry	Ron Munn	Lynn Dell Harrell; Dawn Dodson
1981–1982	Gregory A. Wilson	Carey Dietert	Lynn Dell Harrell; Dawn Dodson
1982–1983	Douglas E. Bakenhaus	Scott Sigler	Dawn Dodson; Debbie Fritz
1983–1984	David Walshak	Kathy Gatton	Debbie Fritz
1984–1985	Wayne Martin	Kathy Gatton	Debbie Fritz
1985–1986	Scott Hastings	John Loessin	Debbie Fritz; Kristie Kriegel Peterman
1986–1987	Scott Duran	Malcolm Randig	Debbie Fritz; Kristie Kriegel Peterman
1987–1988	David Dubose	Tara Bernhard	Debbie Fritz; Kristie Kriegel Peterman
1988–1989	Chris Carter	Kent Kostka	Kristie Kriegel Peterman
1989–1990	Chris Carter	Kevin Brown	Kristie Kriegel Peterman
1990–1991	John Fleming	Warren Schick	Kristie Kriegel Peterman; Susan Tyroch Lynn
1991–1992	John Fleming	Julia Cook	Susan Tyroch Lynn; Amy Ray
1992–1993	Julia Cook	Lisa Epifani	Susan Tyroch Lynn; Amy Ray
1993–1994	Mike Webber	Christi Cuellar	Amy Ray; Dr. Coral Noonan-Terry
1994–1995	Christi Cuellar	Ray Joseph	Dr. Coral Noonan-Terry
1995–1996	Roger Simmons	Jimmy Maas	Dr. Coral Noonan-Terry
1996–1997	Judd Frieling	Ken Johnson	Dr. Coral Noonan-Terry
1997–1998	Rob Hower	Jennifer Hay	Dr. Coral Noonan-Terry
1998–2000	Brandon J. Allen	Maegan Casey	Dr. Coral Noonan-Terry; Mandy Hampton Wray
1999–2000	Brandon J. Allen	Ben Lee Schneider	Dr. Coral Noonan-Terry; Mandy Hampton Wray
2000–2001	Doug Henderson	Alex Hernandez; Robert Kevin Jones	Dr. Coral Noonan-Terry; Mandy Hampton Wray; Paige Pattillo-Brown
2001–2002	Doug Henderson	Marc Anthony Johnson	Mandy Hampton Wray; Paige Pattillo-Brown
2002–2003	Ryan Zysk	Adonis Directo; Leslie Hollingsworth	Paige Pattillo-Brown
2003–2004	Mack Wood	Jennings McClarty	Paige Pattillo-Brown
2004–2005	Mack Wood	Derek Deas	Whitney Coons
2005–2006	Kim Shuttlesworth	Sarah Voges	Whitney Coons
2006–2007	Sean Wahrmund	Brian Schnittker	Whitney Coons
2007–2008	Robert Selaiden	Zack Allen	Alexa Bourdage
2008–2009	John Brady	Colin Barnett	Alexa Bourdage
2009–2010	Tyler Dube	Liz Prentice	Alexa Bourdage
2010–2011	David Forinash	Sam Clark	Alexa Bourdage
2011–2012	David Forinash	Mariana Fanous	Alexa Bourdage
2012–2013	Alex Judd	Sophia Sherman	Ashley Dolan
2013–2014	Alex Judd	Alison Goodwin	Ashley Dolan
2014–2015	Thomas Grothouse	Erin McAtee	Ashley Dolan
2015–2016	Mason Hurtte	Kody Jones	Ashley Dolan
2016–2017	Kevin Kwaku	Henry Merschat	Erica Kuntz
2017–2018	Jeff Bell	Pamela Hildebrand	Erica Kuntz
2018–2019	Jessica Martinez	Jasmine Iafeta-Lelauti	Erica Kuntz
2019–2020	Ally Morales	Canyon Evenson	Caroline Carothers
2020–2021	Ally Morales	Karissa Ismael	Caroline Carothers
2021–2022	Christian Douglas	Justin Phan	Aidyn Mentry
2022–2023	Paula Boothman	Molly Mathis	Aidyn Mentry
2023–2024	Paula Boothman	Azili Omar	Aidyn Mentry
2024–2025	Jaiden Walker	Sarah Campa	Aidyn Mentry
2025–2026	Hailey Hickerson	Brennan Stein	Gracie Williams
2026–2027	Madison Bookman	Ashley Young	Gracie Williams

== Organizational structure ==
=== Audition Process ===
Instrumentalists

Membership in the Longhorn Band is contingent upon a multi-step audition process. Prospective members must first submit a video playing audition. Upon approval of the video audition by band staff, the prospective member is invited to Band Week, which immediately precedes the start of the fall semester, and are sent traditional music and selected halftime music. At Band Week, prospective members are taught the band's marching style and attend multiple music rehearsals to prepare for the final marching and playing audition. This final audition determines membership in the band and field placement.

==== Feature Twirler ====
Auditions for feature twirler are held only when the position is open. These auditions occur separately from the auditions for the main band and are generally held in the spring.

==== Colorguard ====
Texas Silks auditions involve a video audition round in the spring, demonstrating spinning fundamentals and dance skill. Following the video round, and attendance at a summer clinic, prospectives perform a final marching and flag audition at Band Week. Big Flags are often composed of non-marching instrumentalists (double reeds, strings).

===== Bertha Crew =====
Originally called Drum Wranglers and historically managed by members of the Big Flags section with high marching scores, recently the position has gone to instrumentalists, determined during Band Week. The title of Head Bertha goes to a Big Flag Section Leader.

=== Instrumentation and Auxiliaries ===
Rather than mellophones, baritones, and tubas, LHB has Mellos, SOB's (Society of Baritones), and TUBA!s. Also, the band does not march flutes, only piccolos or Piccs.

Section	Number
Picc	36
Clarinet	44
Saxophone	54
Trumpet	70
Mello	36
Trombone	36
SOB	25
TUBA!	28
Percussion	31
Big Flags	15
Silks	18
Bertha Crew	5

== Marching ==
The Longhorn Band performs a different show at each home football game throughout the year. These shows include 'Traditional Shows', which feature signature music and drill, and 'Non-Traditional Shows', which feature contemporary music and a modern marching style.

=== 2024–2025 Marching Shows ===
Game	Halftime
8/31 vs. Colorado State University	Get the Led Out: All Gas No Brakes Featuring the music of Led Zeppelin
9/7 at University of Michigan	N/A (Travel Band)
9/14 vs. University of Texas at San Antonio	LHB 125
9/21 vs. University of Louisiana at Monroe	LHB 125 with Longhorn Alumni Band Joint Performance
9/28 vs. Mississippi State University	LHB 125
10/12 Texas vs. Oklahoma	Wall to Wall
10/19 vs. University of Georgia	The Music of Gregg Rolie Featuring Gregg Rolie, Josie Tolson, and Gary Brown
10/26 at Vanderbilt University	N/A (Travel Band)
11/9 vs. University of Florida	USO Tour
11/16 at University of Arkansas	N/A (Travel Band)
11/23 vs. University of Kentucky	USO Tour
11/30 at Texas A&M University	USO Tour
12/7 vs. University of Georgia (SEC Championship)	Get the Led Out: All Gas No Brakes Featuring the music of Led Zeppelin
12/21 vs. Clemson University (Playoff First Round)	Get the Led Out: All Gas No Brakes Featuring the music of Led Zeppelin
1/1/25 vs. Arizona State University (Peach Bowl)	Get the Led Out: All Gas No Brakes Featuring the music of Led Zeppelin
1/10/25 vs. Ohio State University (Cotton Bowl)	Get the Led Out: All Gas No Brakes Featuring the music of Led Zeppelin

=== Curl-on entrance ===
The curl-on entrance is a traditional entrance in which the marchers enter from both east and west sidelines. To reach this position, the section is positioned on the field, divided in the center, and then the marcher closest to the sideline begins a spiral towards the nearest end zone until all marchers are in a tight spiral with the last marcher on the sideline. This entrance is utilized for Wall-to-Wall Band performances, as well as other special occasions. Marchers enter with a Taps 8 to 5 stride, but adjust to a 6 to 5 interval for downfield marching.

Execution

After 4 whistles, the percussion will play eight "dead beats," during which time the band remains at attention. The function of these 8 counts is to establish tempo in a noisy stadium. Following the 8 dead beats, the person on the sideline leads on the marchers to the field. Marchers kick off from the sideline every two steps. After a designated number of counts, a 9-count halt cadence will be played.

=== Script Texas ===
First performed in 1957, "Script Texas" is a traditional halftime show performed every year. The Drum Major leads the band onto the field in a single-file line, spelling "Texas" in script writing. The band is split into two blocks at the start of the performance and begins by playing "The Yellow Rose of Texas." The Drum Major marches over to the front of block one and block one begins spelling out the T-E-X of "Texas". They only spell out the bottom part of the T and the / of the X, though. While the first block follows the Drum Major out onto the field, the color guard who are in block one march in a large circle to the side of the band before putting the top on the T after block one has marched to their positions. At the end of "The Yellow Rose of Texas," the band goes straight into "March of the Longhorns" and the rest of "Texas" is spelled out. Once "March of the Longhorns" is over, "Calypso" starts and the Drum Major leads the Saxophones, who are by themselves, into an arc that comes down and below A and S. This concludes Script Texas, and "Texas Fight" is played while the band marches off of the field. As of 2019, Script Texas has not been performed as a Halftime Show.

=== Wall-to-Wall Band/Shotgun Texas ===
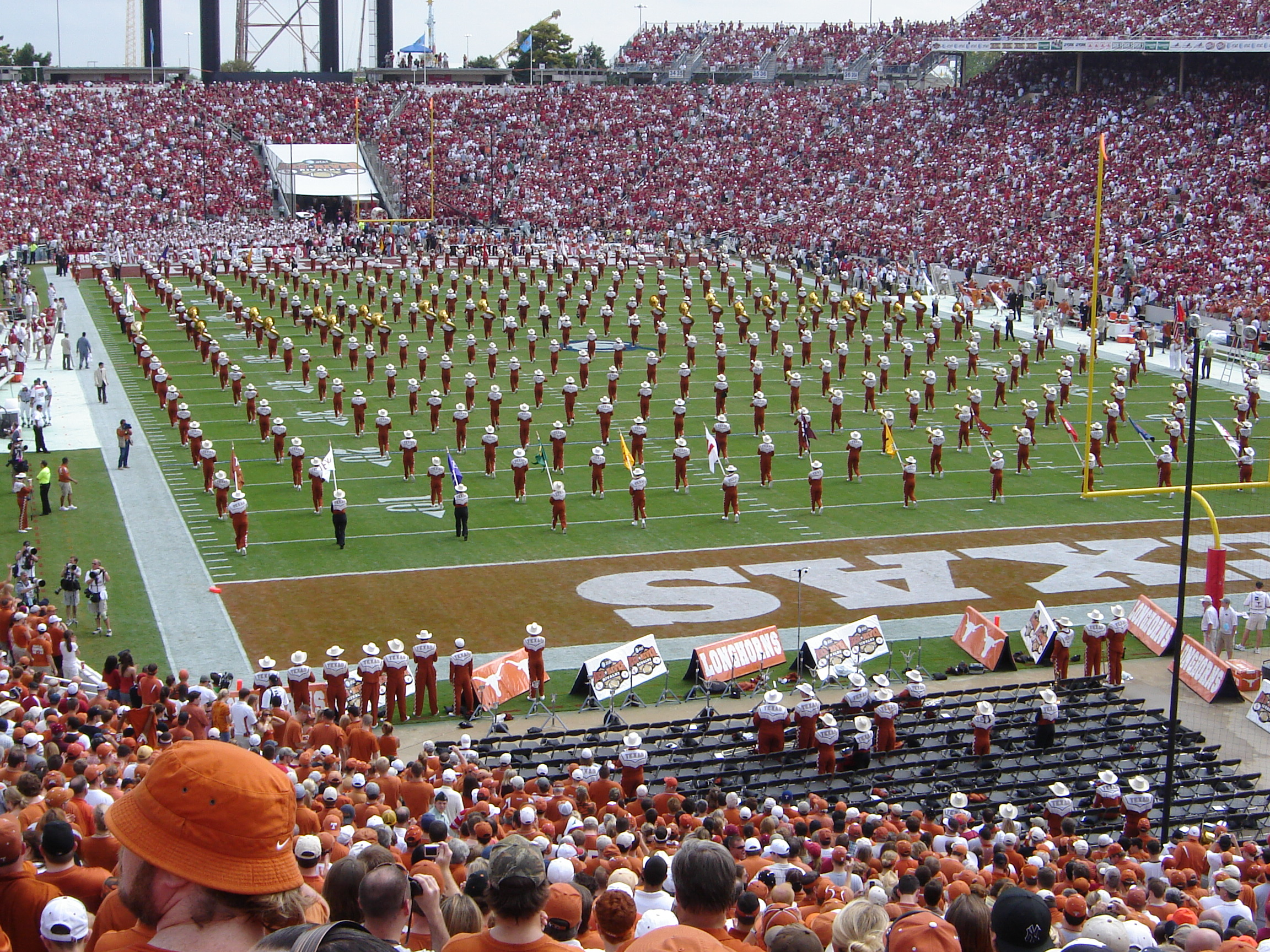
The Longhorn Band performing Wall-to-Wall at the 2007 Red River Shootout

"Wall to Wall Band" is another traditional drill performed annually by Longhorn Band. The drum line starts in the end zone while the band is off on each of the sidelines curled into spirals. The drum line marches onto the field, playing a cadence while the band usually jumps up and down over on the sides. After the drum line reaches their starting position, the Drum Major calls the band to attention, followed by another cadence that brings the band onto the field. The spirals are unrolled and the band marches straight down the yard lines and form into fronts. A roll off ensues, and "March Grandioso" begins. Every six counts, parts of fronts step off, marching in a six-to-five step, and form less dense fronts that still span the width of the field. Halfway through "March Grandioso," the band halts for 4 counts of silence, followed by a proclamation to beat the hell out of Texas' opponent. The band then continues down the field playing the rest of "March Grandioso" and transitioning straight into "March of the Longhorns." Once a front reaches the opposite end zone, a counter-march is performed to bring the band back the way it came. Before the counter-march, the Longhorn band covers the entire football field, putting meaning to the name Wall-to-Wall band. At the trio of "March of the Longhorns," the band contracts into larger fronts that span the width of the football field, then condense into smaller ones that span a little more than the distance between the hashes. At the end of "March of the Longhorns," Wall-to-Wall Band is officially finished, though it is typically followed by Shotgun Texas, in which several condensed fronts quickly shift to spell "TEXAS" in block letters. To start Shotgun Texas, another roll off starts and the band goes straight into "Texas Fight." After the Intro of "Texas Fight," the band spells out each letter of "TEXAS," leaving the fronts every 8 counts of "Texas Fight." In 2007, a twist was added to Shotgun Texas where, during the Interlude of "Texas Fight," the Longhorn band flipped the "Texas" from its traditionally facing west direction to spell it to the east side for the student section of the stadium. After the Interlude, the band marches off the field, concluding Shotgun Texas.

== Pregame ==
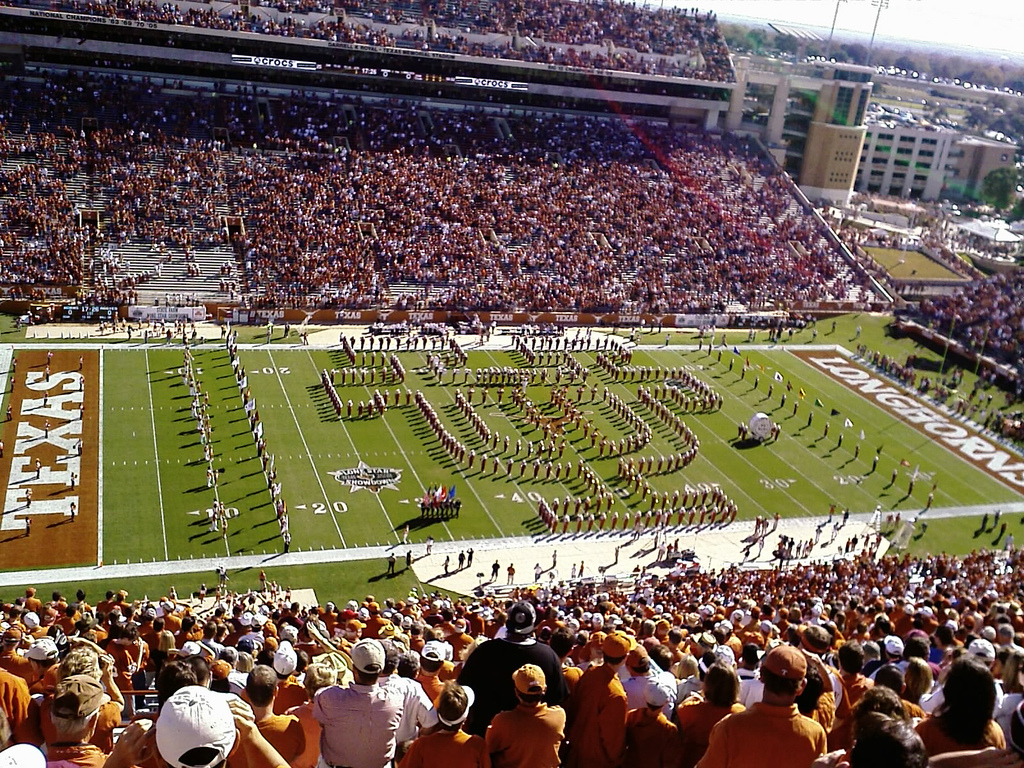
The Longhorn Band performing their pregame show at the 2006 Texas A&M game

Current Pregame (as of 2023) The band fills the end zone during Hook 'Em Herd. When Big Bertha enters the field, the Drum Major begins the call to attention. Pregame begins with a march out in fronts and is followed by the "Eyes of Texas Fanfare". The fronts close in and the band plays the entirety of "Texas Fight". Following Texas Fight, the third down cheer is played as the band drag-turns in all directions of the stadium. The band then begins playing a rendition of "Texas Our Texas". Following the conclusion of the first segment of pregame the National Anthem and the Eyes of Texas are performed. As the University mascot, Bevo, enters the stadium, the Band begins playing "Ecstasy of Gold" from The Good, the Bad, and The Ugly, followed by Deep in the Heart of Texas and March Grandioso. At this point, the band forms a T formation and marches facing toward the South endzone to conclude pregame with Texas Fight as the football team enters the field.

Prior Pregame Shows The band marches through the north tunnel and fills the north end-zone with fourteen fronts. Instruments are held above the heads of the band members while they march in before coming down to play the fight song. The fronts cross the field using a modified high-step, called Taps Stride. The fronts march through the duration of "Texas Fight" and 8 counts afterwards, then halt and perform "Eyes Fanfare" to the east, north, and finally west side. Afterwards, the band begins "Texas Fight" again and marches the rest of the way down the field, turning once each front hits the 15 yard line and performing a counter-march toward the opposite end zone until stopping at the end of "Texas Fight." The band turns to face the west stands and performs an up-tempo arrangement of "Texas our Texas", the official state song, and the fronts then adjust to form an interlocking UT. The band stays at this position for announcements, the opponent's school song, and finally "The Star Spangled Banner" is played. Since some opponents travel long distances, they can't bring their band. If this is the case, the Longhorn band plays the opponents school song. After "The Star Spangled Banner" and the presentation of the colors, the band starts "Deep in the Heart of Texas" and marches to form a block T. After "Deep in the Heart of Texas," the sideways block T is then floated toward the south end zone while the band plays "Calypso." About a third of the way through "Calypso," the band halts and faces toward the 25 or 35 yard line. Normally, the top of the T stops at the back of the south end zone. However, due to stadium construction, for the 2007 season, the visiting team uses a locker room at the south end of the stadium, so the band stops at the front of the end zone to give the visiting team room to run to their side line. Once stopped, there are a few more announcements that take place, followed by the possible performance of "March Grandioso." "March Grandioso" is only played if enough time is left before the football team comes out. If not, the band goes straight into "The Eyes of Texas." Right after this, a short video is shown, followed by the entrance of the football team, accompanied by "Texas Fight." After this, the band marches through the south end zone before entering the stand for the game.

TXOU Pregame At the annual TXOU rivalry game, Wall to Wall Band is usually performed as pregame.

=== Non-traditional shows ===
The Longhorn Band performs four non-traditional shows each year. The band typically selects music that highlights a wide variety of musical artists and thematic ideas. The music and drill for these performances are arranged by current and former staff of the University of Texas School of Music. Thanks to the high general level of musical talent in the Longhorn Band, complex arrangements of popular tunes appear many times every year.

Selected recent non-traditional shows

- Grammy's Show – "Get Lucky", "Happy", "Can't Hold Us", "Black Dog", and "Kashmir" Performed November 27, 2014
- Buble Show – "It Had Better Be Tonight", "Fever", and "Theme from Spiderman" Performed October 4, 2014
- LHBeyoncé Show – "End of Time", "Crazy in Love", "Single Ladies", "Love on Top", "Countdown", and "Love on Top" Performed September 7, 2014
- Les Misérables Show – "Look Down", "On My Own", "Plummet Attack", and "One Day More" Performed October 12, 2013
- Funk Show – "Living in America", "Superstition", "Uptight", and "Fantasy" Performed November 28, 2013
- Disney Show – "The Incredibles", "Pirates of the Caribbean", and "Circle of Life" – Performed September 14, 2013
- The Who Show – "Who Are You", "Pinball Wizard", "I Can See for Miles", "Won't Get Fooled Again" Performed November 22, 2012
- Music from West Side Story – "Mambo", "Maria", "Tonight" Performed October 20, 2012
- Queen Show – "Somebody to Love", "We Are the Champions", "Bicycle Race", "Fat Bottomed Girls", "Bohemian Rhapsody" Performed November 19, 2011
- Led Zeppelin Show – "Rock and Roll", "Heartbreaker", "Black Dog", "Kashmir", "Stairway to Heaven" Performed January 5, 2009 at the Fiesta Bowl
- Heroes Show – "Batman/ Superman", "The Incredibles", "Robin Hood: Prince of Thieves" Performed November 10, 2007
- Channel One Suite – Buddy Rich's "Channel One Suite" Performed October 20, 2007
- TV Show – Theme from "Hawaii Five-O", "The A-Team", "The Simpsons", "Family Guy" Performed November 4, 2006
- 70s/80s Rock Show – "Any Way You Want It", "25 or 6 to 4", "Carry On Wayward Son" Performed September 2, 2006
- The Beatles Show – "Help!", "Got to Get You In My Life", "She Loves You", "I Want to Hold You Hand", "Hey Jude" Performed January 4, 2006 at the Rose Bowl
- Malagueña – Ernesto Lecuona's "Malagueña" Performed October 7, 2006
- Secret Agent Show – Theme from "James Bond", "Austin Powers", "Inspector Gadget" Performed October 22, 2005
- Video Game Show – Theme from "Tetris", "The Legend of Zelda", "Super Mario Bros." Performed November 6, 2004

== Music ==
In attendance at all home and away football games, the band performs signature songs. Many have been rooted in the band for many years.

- "The Eyes of Texas"
- "Texas Fight"
- "Taps in One" (a version of Texas Fight played in 3, played after a win)
- "Wabash Cannonball" (first played at the request of Darrell K Royal), coincidentally a main fight song of former Big 12 Conference rival Kansas State and usually performed at the conclusion of the third quarter
- "March Grandioso"
- "March of the Longhorns"
- "Deep in the Heart of Texas"
- "Calypso"
- "William Tell Overture"
- "UT Detroit"
- "Victory"
- "Ghost Riders in the Sky"
- "Respect"
- "Rawhide"
- "Bone Tell" (a version of William Tell Overture arranged for the trombone section and performed at all home games, sometimes for fans around the stadium)
- "Strong Eyes"
- "Mickey Mouse March" (played to make fun of the Texas A&M Aggies; the Longhorn Band discontinued this practice after the 1999 Aggie Bonfire collapse)
- Dudley Do-Right

Newer repertoire the LHB songbook includes tunes such as:

- Orange and White
- Swag Surfin
- Hurricane Season
- Still Fly
- Neck
- Big Ballin
- Right Above It
- Baile Inolvidable

== Features ==
=== Big Bertha ===
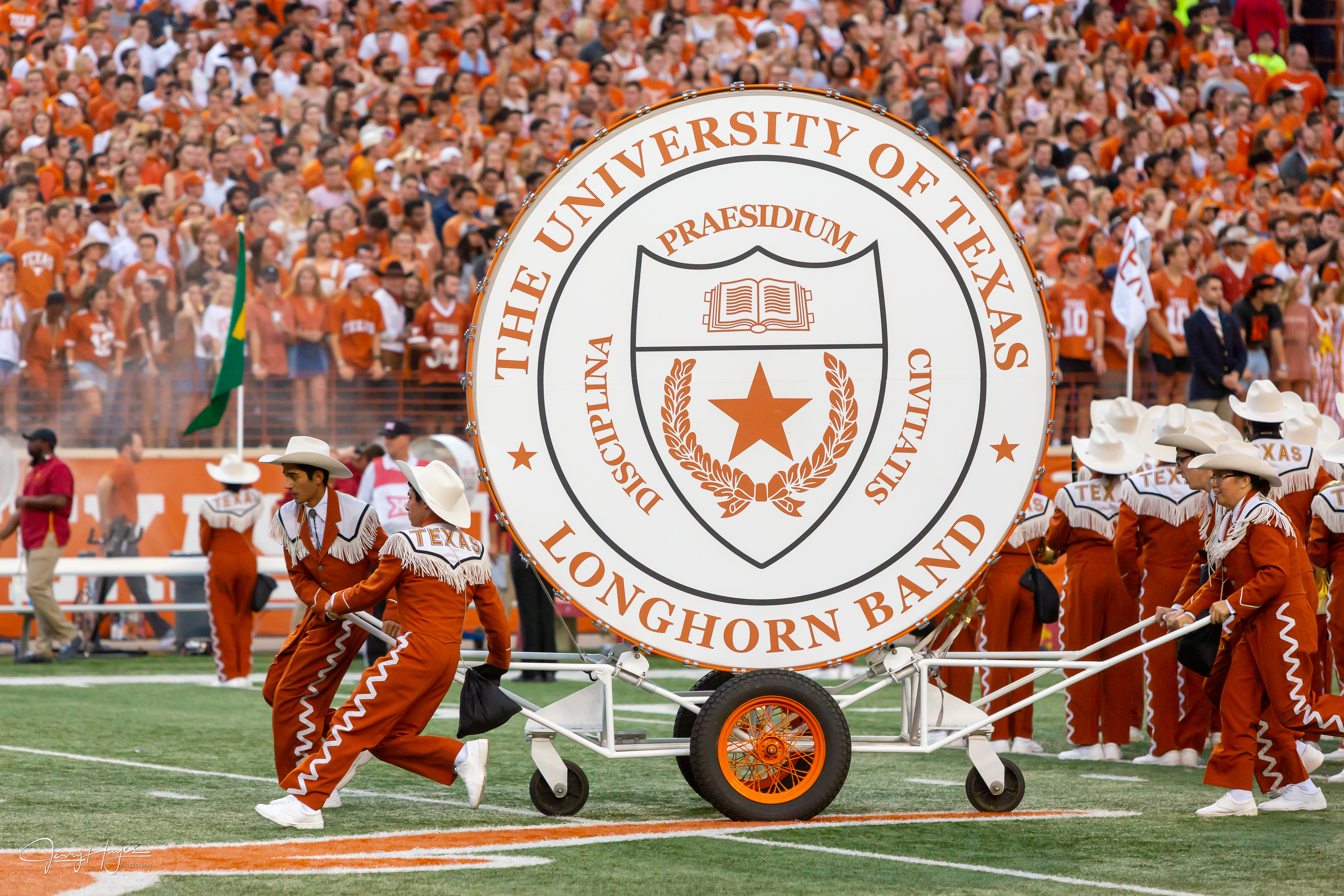
Big Bertha – Fall 2018

The band features Big Bertha, which is considered to be one of the world's largest bass drums. The drum is managed by the Bertha Crew, sometimes called "drum wranglers". The crew moves the drum around the field during performances, and twirls it when the team scores. Big Bertha was nicknamed the "Sweetheart of the Longhorn Band" when it arrived at The University of Texas campus in 1955. In 1955, the director of the Longhorn Band was Colonel D. Harold Byrd who purchased Big Bertha from the University of Chicago, then for only one dollar. Big Bertha performs in the traditional Longhorn Band pregame show performed before kickoff at every home game. She also performs in 'Script Texas', another LHB traditional show. She makes appearances at other events, such as appearing outside Gregory Gymnasium before volleyball games.

The drum was retired on October 15, 2022, after 100 years of service, making its last appearance during the halftime show in the football game with the Iowa State Cyclones alongside its replacement, Big Bertha II. The new drum measures 9.5 ft in diameter, making it the largest bass drum in the world.

=== Cowbells ===
During football games, members of the Longhorn Band shake cowbells to create noise in the stadium while the opposing team has the ball. The bells are rung only after the opposing team snaps the ball or in conjunction with drum cadences. When the opposing team is in the "red zone", the drumline will, at times, call a cadence that simply calls for the band to create as much noise as possible with the cowbells.

=== Travel Band ===
While the entire band traditionally travels to all in-state football games and bowl games, a smaller travel band composed mainly of section leaders is taken to out-of-state games.

== Traditions ==
The Longhorn Band is the largest organization on The University of Texas campus, and is associated with numerous traditional events.

=== "Shake the Fringe" ===
Performed in conjunction with certain drum cadences, "Shake the Fringe" refers to the effect that results from a Longhorn Band member moving their shoulders back and forth in quick, violent motions. The "Fringe" of the uniform then flails wildly in the air.

=== "Home on the Range" ===
Sung during the last two minutes of every home football game, the members of the Longhorn Band place their arms around each other, begin swaying from side to side and then jump up-and-down as they sing their own colorful take on a traditional state song:

Home, home on the range,
where the deer and the antelope play [shout: with themselves!]
Where seldom is heard,
a discouraging word,
and the skies are not cloudy all day. [Hey, hey, hey]

The tradition started in the 1970s when the band would often sing dirty songs in the stands. The director at the time yelled at the band to sing something nice like "Home on the Range", and so the version now sung was created.

=== "Hup...hup...hup" ===
Innocent and unsuspecting pedestrians may find themselves as objects of entertainment for the Longhorn Band members. After targeting an individual, LHB members will yell "hup" every time the target takes a step. Once the individual realizes what is happening they typically adjust their strides in an effort to confuse, trick, evade, or hoodwink the band. The "hups" continue until the individual stands still, at which point the band lets out a long sigh, or if the individual trips and falls down.

=== In The Stands ===
The Longhorn Band follows many traditions while in the stands for Longhorn football games. Most of all, all members stand for the entire game and yell before every play in conjunction with ringing their cowbells. Numerous times throughout the game, the "Texas! . . . Fight!" chant is yelled by the entire stadium. Also, the drumline plays cadences between almost every play, all of which are accompanied by dancing or chanting, such as "Go, Horns, Go", "Where my horns at?", "Defense!", and "Texas, Texas, yeehaw!" Texas Colorguard members do not use flags in the stands, and instead perform dance routines to LHB Stand Tunes.

=== New Member Beanie ===
After audition results are posted, the new members are presented with the traditional Longhorn Band New Member Beanie. There is then a contest held to see which of the new members can consecutively wear the beanie to practices the longest. The male and female new members who wear their beanie the longest are traditionally rewarded with a steak dinner.

=== Spring Banquet ===
Each spring, usually the first weekend in May, the Longhorn Band Spring Awards Banquet takes place. This event is not only a celebration of the previous year's achievements but also the event that passes the torch to the next generation of LHB by the presentation of scholarships and traditional honors such as:

- Scholarships awarded by the Alumni Band
- Lettering awards for LHB's First and Veteran Members
- Passing of the President's Ring to the new council president
- Passing of the Freshman Advisor Beanies to the new Advisors
- Announcement of the next year's Drum Major, and presentation of the Drum Major Buckle
- Presentation of various other awards for service, achievement, or other significance.

=== President's Ring ===
One tradition of LHB is the "Passing of the President's Ring." During this ceremony, which takes place at the annual Spring Banquet, the former Band President presents the ring to the new president. The tradition began at the close of World War II when the parents of Curtis Popham, Longhorn Band Drum Major, who was killed in the war, gave Curtis' University ring to the Band for this purpose.

=== Drum Major's belt buckle ===
The Drum Major's belt buckle is passed on to the new Drum Major at the annual Spring Banquet. Engraved on the back are the names of past Longhorn Band Drum Majors beginning in 1969.

== Alumni and related organizations ==
=== Longhorn Alumni Band ===
The Longhorn Alumni Band, or LHAB, was founded in 1964 by 5 couples and former director Vincent R. DiNino and his wife Jane. LHAB is composed of former members of the Longhorn Band. The Longhorn Alumni Band plays at many events, services, and celebrations around the state as well as Alumni Band Day. On Alumni Band Day, many former Longhorn Band members come together for a special halftime performance during one of the football games. During the combined performance, LHB and LHAB share the field, with over 1,000 musicians. The Longhorn Alumni Band is the largest in the world, with over 5,000 members among its ranks, scattered around the globe. In 2015, LHAB performed in London's New Year's Day Parade as the featured band and Big Bertha led the parade. In 2019, LHAB was featured at the 75th Anniversary of D-Day in Normandy, performed a parade in Sainte-Mère-Église, and a public performance in Paris at the Jardin d'Acclimatation. Members of the Longhorn Alumni Band also were instrumental in the formation of the National Association of Alumni Bands in 2020. Since its inception, LHAB has raised over $2,000,000 in scholarships to help Longhorn Band students with tuition and school expenses.

=== Longhorn Band Student Association ===
The Longhorn Band Student Association (LHBSA) is the group responsible for organizing student activities within the Longhorn Band. Its main purpose is to serve the Longhorn Band by helping members become acquainted and accustomed to working with one another. The LHBSA is a registered student organization with the U.T. dean of students office. Membership is open to any Longhorn Band member, and the active fees are determined by the members each year. The LHBSA sponsors social events throughout the year and the annual Longhorn Band Awards Banquet in the spring.

The officers of LHBSA are collectively termed the Band Council. Election of officers is held during the spring semester at a general meeting of the members of the LHBSA. The Freshman Advisors are elected by the LHBSA members during a general meeting in the fall. The Presidents of Kappa Kappa Psi and Tau Beta Sigma are elected by their respective organizations and the Drum Major is determined by audition. Freshman Representatives are elected by the first year members of Longhorn Band at a special meeting following the posting of the final Longhorn Band audition results. The Parliamentarian, if deemed beneficial, is appointed by the President.

=== Kappa Kappa Psi/Tau Beta Sigma ===
The band is supported by a service fraternity and sorority, the Alpha Tau chapter of Kappa Kappa Psi and the Beta Gamma chapter of Tau Beta Sigma, respectively.

=== Longhorn Pep Band ===
Historically referred to as the Basketball Band, The Longhorn Pep Band plays at all home volleyball and men's and women's basketball games. While technically a separate ensemble from the Longhorn Band, it falls under the same umbrella of leadership and shares many members with the Longhorn Band.

=== Supporting organizations ===
External videos
- Longhorn ROTC Band

The Longhorn Air Force Reserve Officer Training Corps (AFJROTC) Detachment 825 maintains a small military band that also supports the Longhorn Marching Band.

== Awards and honors ==
- In 1974, the Longhorn Band was selected to perform at Super Bowl VIII in Houston, Texas.
- In 1986, the Longhorn Band was awarded the prestigious Louis Sudler Intercollegiate Marching Band Trophy.
- The Longhorn Band was selected and performed for inaugurations of Presidents Theodore Roosevelt, John F. Kennedy, Lyndon B. Johnson, Ronald Reagan, George H. W. Bush and the two inaugurations of George W. Bush.

== Honorary members ==
On May 7, 2007, for the first time in Longhorn Band history presented Coach Mack Brown and Athletic Director DeLoss Dodds with Honorary Membership for their outstanding spirit, pride, and leadership. The Longhorn Band Honorary Membership honor was established by then President of Kappa Kappa Psi Eddie Lopez.

== Notable alumni ==
- Rex Tillerson — 69th United States Secretary of State and former ExxonMobil CEO
- Alan Bean — NASA astronaut and fourth man to walk on the Moon
- Michael Webber — distinguished engineering professor, author, and energy scientist
- Carl Meade — NASA astronaut and mission specialist on STS-38, STS-50, and STS-64
