= Pride of Niner Nation Marching Band =

Marching band of UNC Charlotte

The Pride of Niner Nation Marching Band
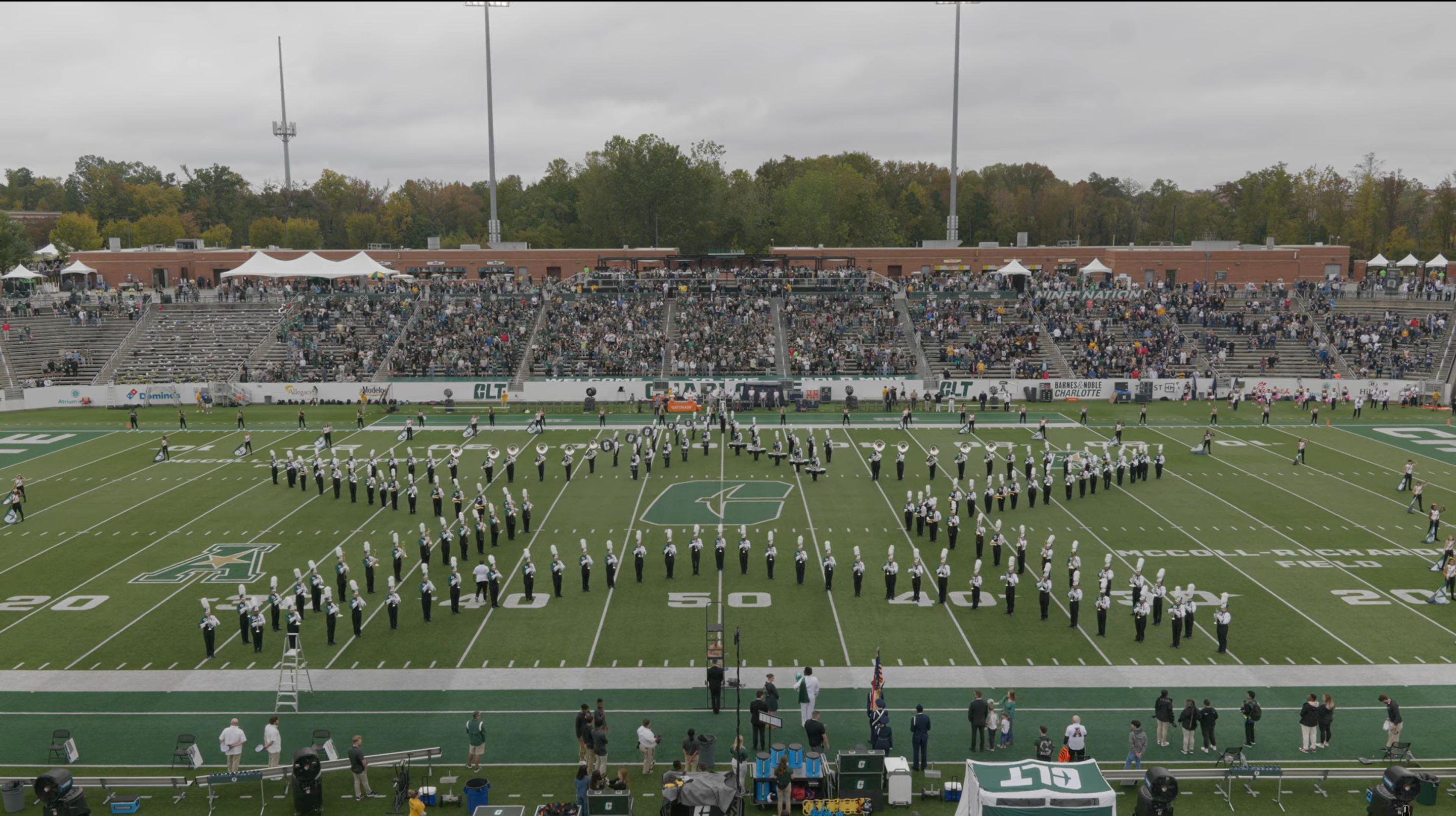
- PNNMB Pregame Show 2023
- School: University of North Carolina at Charlotte
- Location: Charlotte, North Carolina
- Conference: The American
- Founded: 1946-1950, 2015-
- Director: Brian Taylor
- Members: 225+

The University of North Carolina at Charlotte Pride of Niner Nation Marching Band, also known as The Pride of Niner Nation, and PNNMB is the official marching band for the University of North Carolina at Charlotte. They perform at every Charlotte 49ers home football game at Jerry Richardson Stadium and also at various other events such as away football games, pep rallies, parades, and special observances. A partial band usually travels to at least one away game a year. The band includes a color guard and a baton twirler. Members of the PNNMB also participate in Wind Ensemble, Symphonic Band, Jazz Ensemble, and the 49ers Basketball Band.

== History ==
The first marching band at the University of North Carolina at Charlotte was founded in 2015. With the restart of UNC Charlotte's football program in 2013, the university had no immediate plans to start a marching band. Alumnus and former UNC Charlotte Board of Trustees chairman Gene Johnson and his wife Vickie, also an alum, helped to organize several donations for the purchase of equipment and staff for a twenty-five-person drumline, with corresponding scholarships for the drummers. The drumline debuted with the team in 2013. The positive response to these efforts encouraged the university to develop a plan to debut a full marching band for the 2015 season. This included raising $2,000,000 for construction of a permanent home for the band and $4,500,000 to endow scholarships for band members.

In fall 2014 Jeff Miller was hired as the first Director of Athletic Bands and, under UNC Charlotte Director of Bands Shawn Smith, began recruiting the inaugural band class. With an additional gift of $2,000,000 from the Johnsons ground was broken on the Vickie and Gene Johnson Marching Band Center. The members of the drumline and the pre-existing Basketball Pep Band, who would soon merge into the larger marching band, chose the name Pride of Niner Nation Marching Band for the new entity.

The Pride of Niner Nation Marching Band debuted in the 2015 football season alongside the 49ers' move up to FBS level and the inaugural season of C-USA play.

=== Director of Athletic Bands ===
- Jeff Miller (2014–2018)
- Joseph Schievert (2018–2019)
- Shayna Stahl (2019–2021)
- Daniel Fischer (2021–2022)
- Brian Taylor (2023–current)

=== 2018 D-Day anniversary ===
The Pride of Niner Nation Marching Band was invited and accepted to perform in Normandy for the 2018 D-Day anniversary observance. The band was invited in their second year of existence in 2016.
PNNMB in Normandy

== Tradition ==
=== Forty Niners Fight song ===
Music for the fight song was first composed by music faculty member Dr. Harry Bulow in 2001 to replace the original fight song used since the 1960s, University of Texas's "Texas Fight", without lyrics. Lyrics were subsequently added to the new tune in 2006 by then University Directory of Bands Dr. Lawrence Marks.
PNNMB Playing Charlotte 49er Fight Song

Lyrics

Hail, Charlotte 49ers, proud as we can be
We stand to fight for the green and white,
Til we win the Victory (Go Niners!)
We pledge our trust in you,
And wave your colors high
The loyal Niner Nation cheers,
Forever! We'll Fight-Fight-Fight!

=== Pregame ===
==== Niner Walk ====
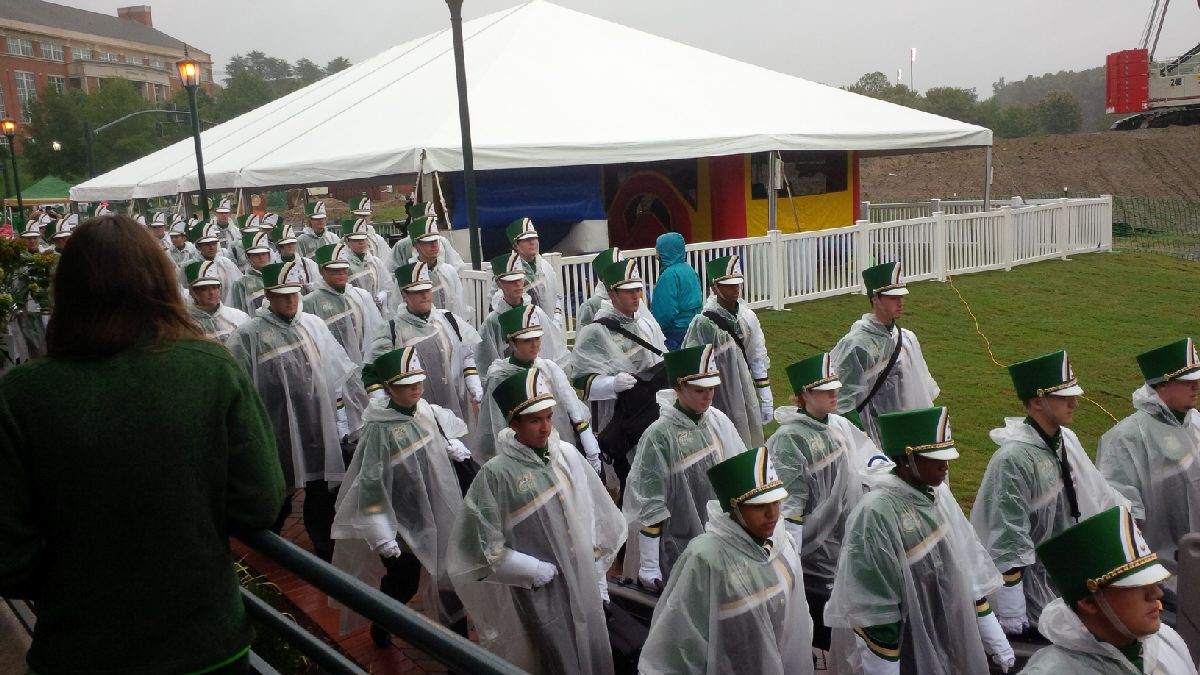
PNNMB Niner Walk

Starting from the Inaugural football season drumline in 2013, the PNNMB has carried on the tradition of leading the Charlotte 49ers football team pre-game Niner Walk.
Niner Walk and Team Intro

==== Pregame Show ====
The show begins with the band high-step marching out from the Rose Football Center to a cadence. The band forms up at midfield, performing "Niner Fanfare" before transitioning into a forward march and playing "UNC Charlotte Fight Song" down the field. "Let's Go Niners" and "Go 49ers" are then played, with drill spelling out "NINERS." The band then regroups into a star formation for "Star-Spangled Banner." This is followed by that year's specific pregame music and formations before marching off back to the Rose Football Center to "Glory 49ers."
2023 PNNMB Pregame Show

Traditional pre and post-game music includes the following:

- Niner Fanfare — Thurston
- Charlotte 49ers Fight Song — Bulow/Campbell/Miller
- Let's Go Niners Cheer — Traditional
- UNC Charlotte Alma Mater — Sutcliffe/Rieke/Haldeman/Miller
- Star-Spangled Banner — Key/Fillmore
- 49ers Musical Cheer — Thurston
- Glory 49ers — Traditional/Miller

=== In the Stands ===
The PNNMB play during in-game action breaks from the top of section 122 of Jerry Richardson Stadium.

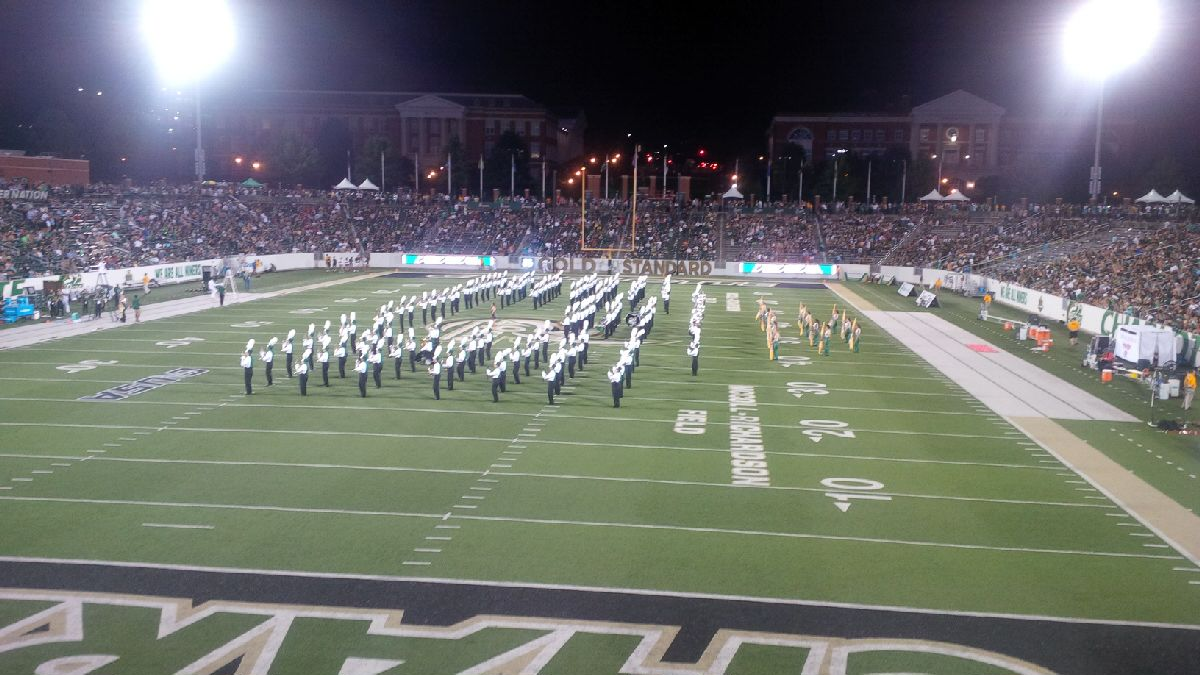
PNNMB 2019 Halftime Show

=== Halftime Show ===
The team marches across the field from the away side and form various formations while playing that year's musical selections. The halftime show has included musical genres featuring Latin, Rock-n-roll, Symphonic Classics, R&B, and Patriotic fare. It has also featured the music of Michael Jackson, Queen, Elton John, Star Wars, and 90's Classics.
2023 PNNMB - Show #2 - The Music of Queen

=== End of the Game ===
The Charlotte 49ers Fight Song and Alma Mater are played at the conclusion of the game.
Post-game Alma Mater

== See also ==
- UNC Charlotte
- Charlotte 49ers
