= Music Building and Recital Hall =

Building in Austin, Texas, U.S.

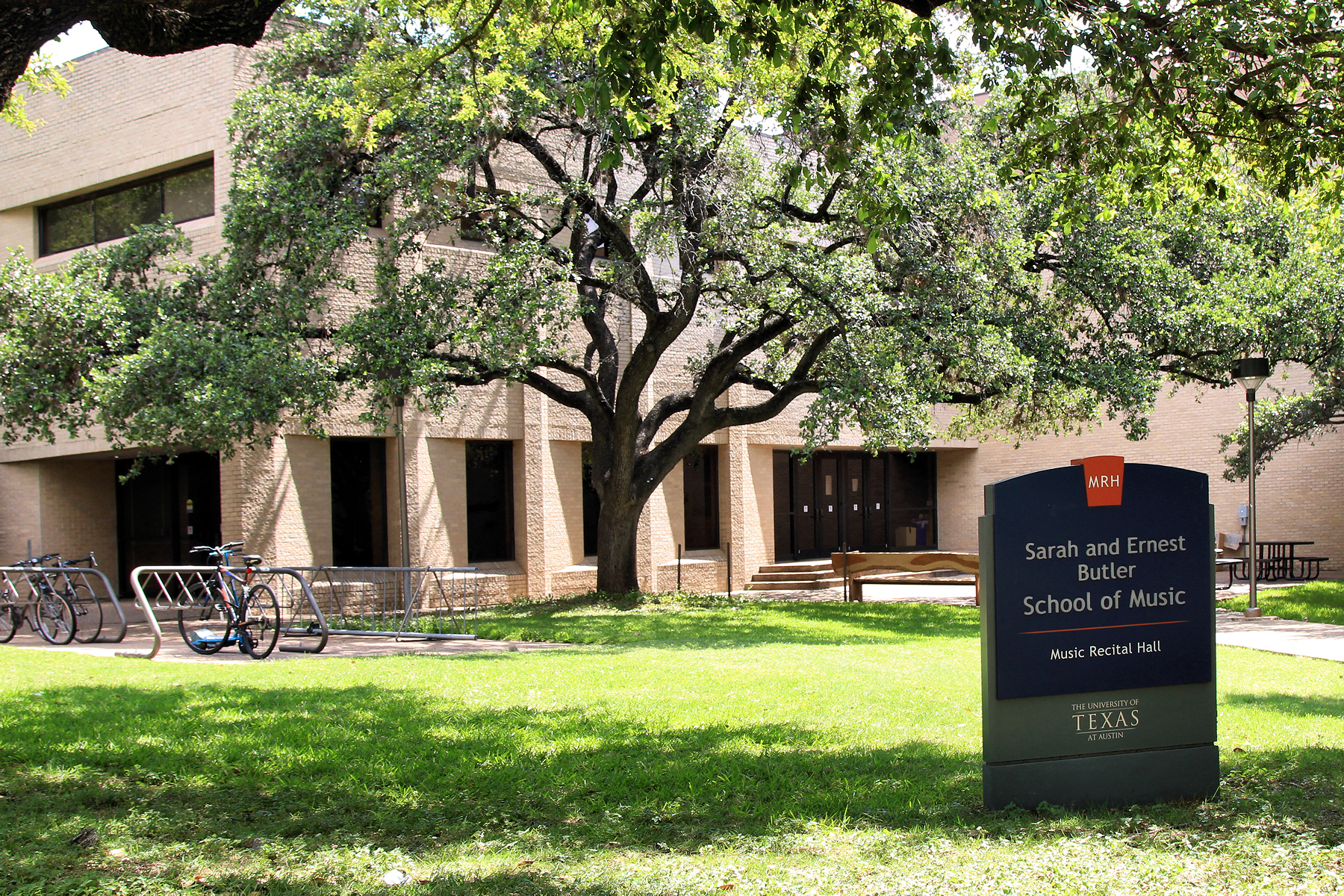
- The Music Building and Recital Hall
- Interactive map of the Music Building and Recital Hall area
- Alternative names: MRH

General information
- Location: University of Texas at Austin, 2406 Robert Dedman Drive, Austin, Texas, United States
- Coordinates: 30°17′14″N 97°43′50″W
- Current tenants: Sarah and Ernest Butler School of Music; Longhorn Band
- Completed: 1969
- Owner: University of Texas at Austin

Technical details
- Floor count: 9
- Floor area: 216,697 sq ft (20,131.8 m^{2})

Design and construction
- Architecture firm: Fisher and Spillman Architects
- Main contractor: Zapata Warrior Constructors

Website
- utdirect.utexas.edu/apps/campus/buildings/nlogon/facilities/utm/mrh/

The Music Building and Recital Hall (MRH) is a building on the University of Texas at Austin campus, in the U.S. state of Texas. The building was completed in 1969.

Bates Recital Hall, part of the University of Texas Performing Arts Center, which seats 700, is housed in the Music Recital Hall.

The Longhorn Band hall is located inside MRH.
