= Tread softly (composition) =

Tread softly is a composition for orchestra by the American composer Nina C. Young. The work was commissioned by the New York Philharmonic as the first part of their "Project 19," an initiative commissioning new works by 19 female composers in honor of the centennial of the ratification of the Nineteenth Amendment to the United States Constitution. It was first performed by the New York Philharmonic under the direction of Jaap van Zweden at David Geffen Hall on February 5, 2020.

== Composition ==
Tread softly is cast in a single movement and has a duration of roughly fourteen minutes in performance. The work's title comes from the final line of poem "Aedh Wishes for the Cloths of Heaven" by W. B. Yeats. In the score program note, Young wrote:

One hundred years after the 19th Amendment was ratified, it still seems radical that I can have a voice, that women can be heard, and taken seriously as equal weavers of the tapestry of American culture. Ideas fly rapidly through my head and paint a dreamscape that, despite all language of equality, always risks being thwarted too soon, edited, erased. We protect ourselves, or we acquiesce, and our pedestal becomes a cage. In the coming seasons, 19 women will work with this illustrious orchestra. And so I ask you, as we spread our sounds into your minds, tread softly, because you tread on our dreams.

=== Instrumentation ===
The work is scored for a large orchestra comprising three flutes (one doubling piccolo), three oboes (one doubling English horn), two clarinets, bass clarinet, two bassoons, contrabassoon, four horns, two trumpets, three trombones, tuba, timpani, percussion (crotales, orchestra bells, vibraphone, suspended cymbals, tam-tam, tambourine, temple blocks, snare drum, bass drum) harp, piano, and strings.

== Reception ==
Reviewing the world premiere, Anthony Tommasini of The New York Times praised Tread softly, describing it as "a good start to the Philharmonic's ambitious and timely project." Jay Nordlinger of The New Criterion wrote, "The piece has plenty of soft percussion, and a 'wash,' at least for a while. I'm talking about an aural sheen. From the brass section, there are interesting sounds, including shudders, mutings, and slidings. There are some fluttering, Debussyan woodwinds—and an extended violin solo, almost a cadenza. It smacks of the Gypsy, and I wrote in my notes, 'Czardas?'" He added, "There are many musical ideas in Tread softly, and whether they cohere, I'm not sure. The work is about ten minutes long—our program booklet said so—but it sounded longer to me. Then again, many new works do (and not a few old ones, to be sure). I also had the feeling that the music was deeply personal to the composer, in ways a listener could not imagine." George Grella of the New York Classical Review was somewhat less favorable, however, describing the work as "an acceptable and fairly predictable commission, a work with skilled notation and a rote conception, the kind of thing that makes up the bulk of new music from professional composers." He added:

The structure was intuitive, and Young's transitions from one idea to the next were skillful—including an exceptionally clever quote from the Scherzo of Beethoven's Ninth Symphony—but the destinations didn't always resonate. This was like listening to someone's dreams, a private and necessarily obscure experience, and the arch form—rising to a late climax and colorful, misty, denouement—was so standard that it caught the piece at a difficult halfway point between an intriguing surrealism and a conventional neo-romantic narrative. Even full of ringing, beguiling sounds, Tread softly still failed to make a strong individual impression.
