= University of Texas Performing Arts Center =

Performance halls in Austin, Texas

Coordinates: 30.286058°N 97.731268°W

Nancy Lee and Perry R. Bass Concert Hall
- Bass Concert Hall
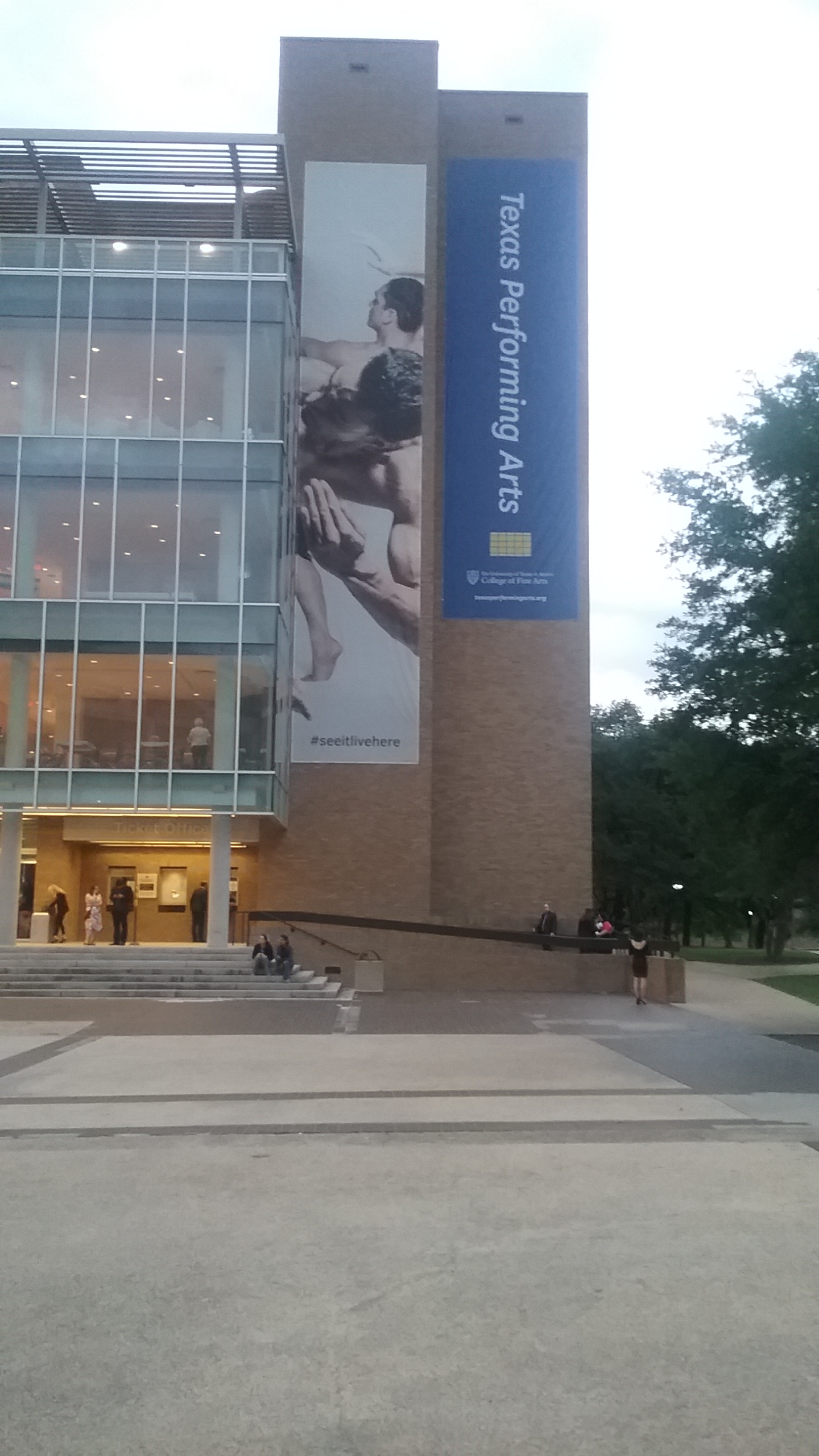
- Interactive map of Nancy Lee and Perry R. Bass Concert Hall
- Address: 2350 Robert Dedman Dr; Austin, TX
- Owner: University of Texas at Austin
- Operator: University of Texas at Austin
- Capacity: 2,900
- Type: Concert hall

Construction
- Opened: 1981
- Rebuilt: 2007

Website
- Official website

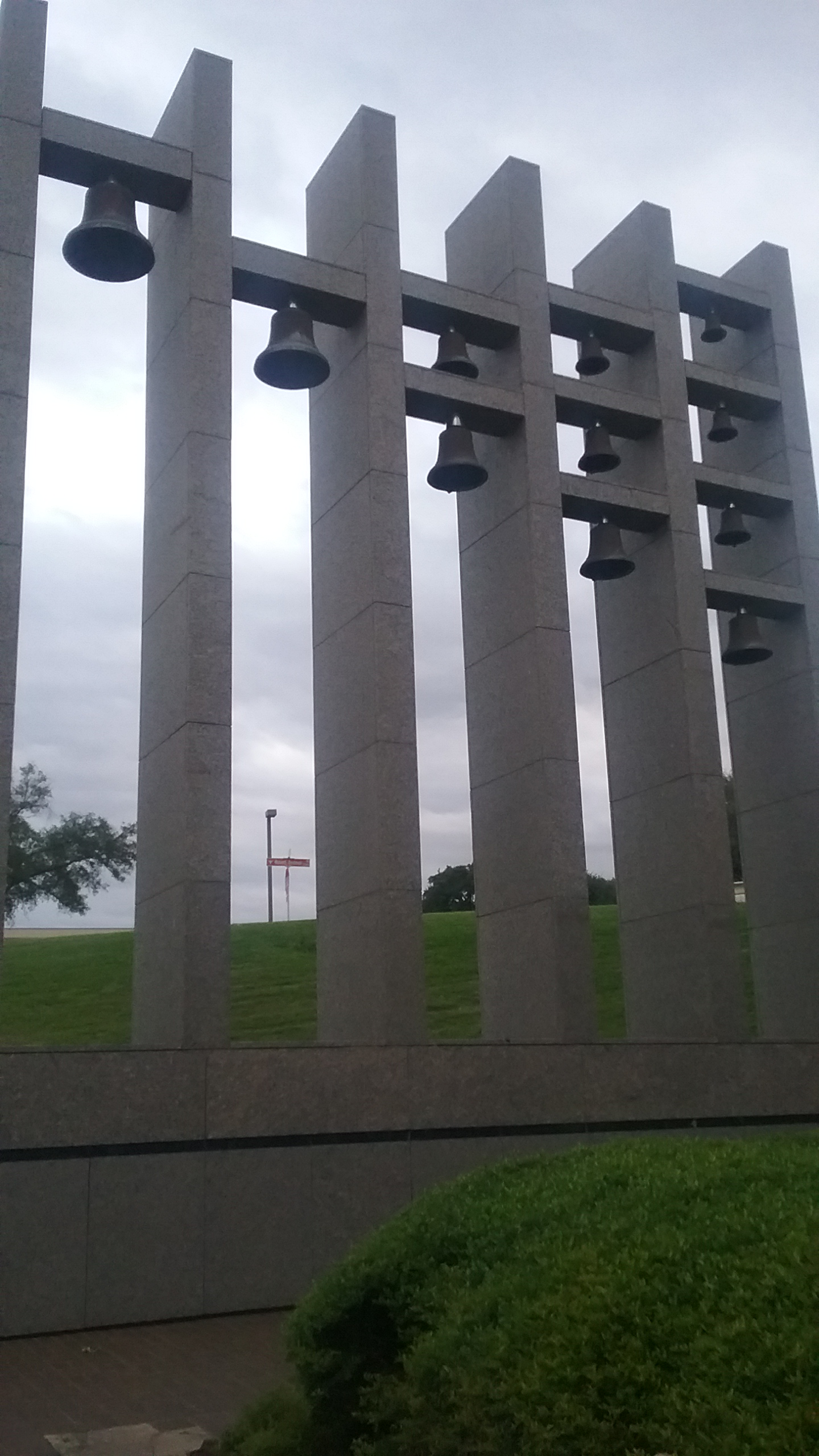
Burleson Bells at the Bass Concert Hall. Retired and placed at this site in 1981.

The University of Texas Performing Arts Center (PAC) is a collective of five theaters operated by The University of Texas at Austin, College of Fine Arts. The theaters are the Bass Concert Hall, McCullough Theatre, Bates Recital Hall, B. Iden Payne Theatre and Oscar Brockett Theatre. Theaters range in size from the Oscar G. Brockett Theatre, which has 244 seats, to the Bass Concert Hall, which seats 2,900. In addition to the theaters, the PAC also has offices and meeting rooms, rehearsal spaces and shops which are located in the PAC building and across the campus.

== History ==
The Center was first opened in 1981. Between 1992 and January, 2008, the Center was directed by Pebbles Wadsworth, who was declared an Honorary Texan in 1987 for her contributions through PAC. Under Wadsworth's supervision, in 2002 PAC launched its multicultural ArtesAméricas program in conjunction with the Teresa Lozano Long Institute of Latin American Studies. Wadsworth conceived of the program in response to a 1998 request by former University of Texas president Larry Faulkner to "strengthen ties between the United States and Latin America." Among other activities, the program facilitates performances by Latin American artists across the United States, at the PAC and at the 52 institutions that partner it.

The Burleson Bells are located in a monument just outside the Bass Concert Hall in Austin, Texas. The bells were donated to the University of Texas at Austin as part of an anonymous gift by Albert Sidney Burleson. They were moved to their present location in 1981.

== Venues ==
=== Bass Concert Hall ===
The Nancy Lee Bass and Perry Richardson Bass Concert Hall opened in 1981 on the site of the former Clark Field home of the Texas Longhorns Baseball team from 1928-1974. It is the largest of the five theaters for Texas Performing Arts. Bass Concert Hall routinely attracts top tier performers and full-scale productions such as Broadway Across America. The hall seats 2,900 and has an orchestra pit capable of holding 100 musicians.

In 2007, Bass Concert Hall began a $14.7 million dollar renovation and facelift. These upgrades included: state-of-the-art acoustics, a glass-front façade and larger lobby, an expanded five-story lobby and atrium, increased restroom capacity, more bars and concession areas, new flooring, sidewalls and décor, and a sixth-level outside deck with expansive campus views.

=== McCullough Theatre ===
Located adjacent to Bass Concert Hall, part of the Performing Arts Center complex, is the McCullough Theatre, home of The University of Texas Opera. The theatre contains 400 seats and a 30-foot proscenium stage and orchestra pit for 35 musicians.

=== Bates Recital Hall ===
Housed in UT's Music Recital Hall, Bates Recital Hall seats 700, and is capable of hosting everything from symphony orchestras, major choral presentations and concert bands to ensembles and solo recitals.

The hall houses the country's third largest tracker organ. Based on an 18th-century Dutch design, the Visser-Rowland organ is three stories tall, weighs 24 tons and has 5,315 pipes.

=== Oscar G. Brockett Theatre ===
The smallest theatre in Texas Performing Arts, located inside the Winship Drama Building, this intimate space seats 244. Since it opened in 1964, it is utilized for student productions of the Department of Theatre & Dance. In April 2001 it was formally dedicated as the “Oscar G. Brockett Theatre,” after Dr. Oscar G. Brockett. Dr. Brockett is former Dean of the College of Fine Arts, the senior professor in the Department of Theatre and Dance, and an authority on theatre history.

=== B. Iden Payne Theatre ===
The 466-seat theatre, located inside the Winship Drama Building, is for plays and dance performances. The theater stages productions by theatre companies and dance troupes, as well as productions by students of the UT Department of Theatre & Dance.

Payne Theatre has hosted Houston’s Alley Theatre, the National Theatre of the Deaf and the 1999 world premiere of Tennessee Williams' "Spring Storm."
