= Michael Webber (engineer) =

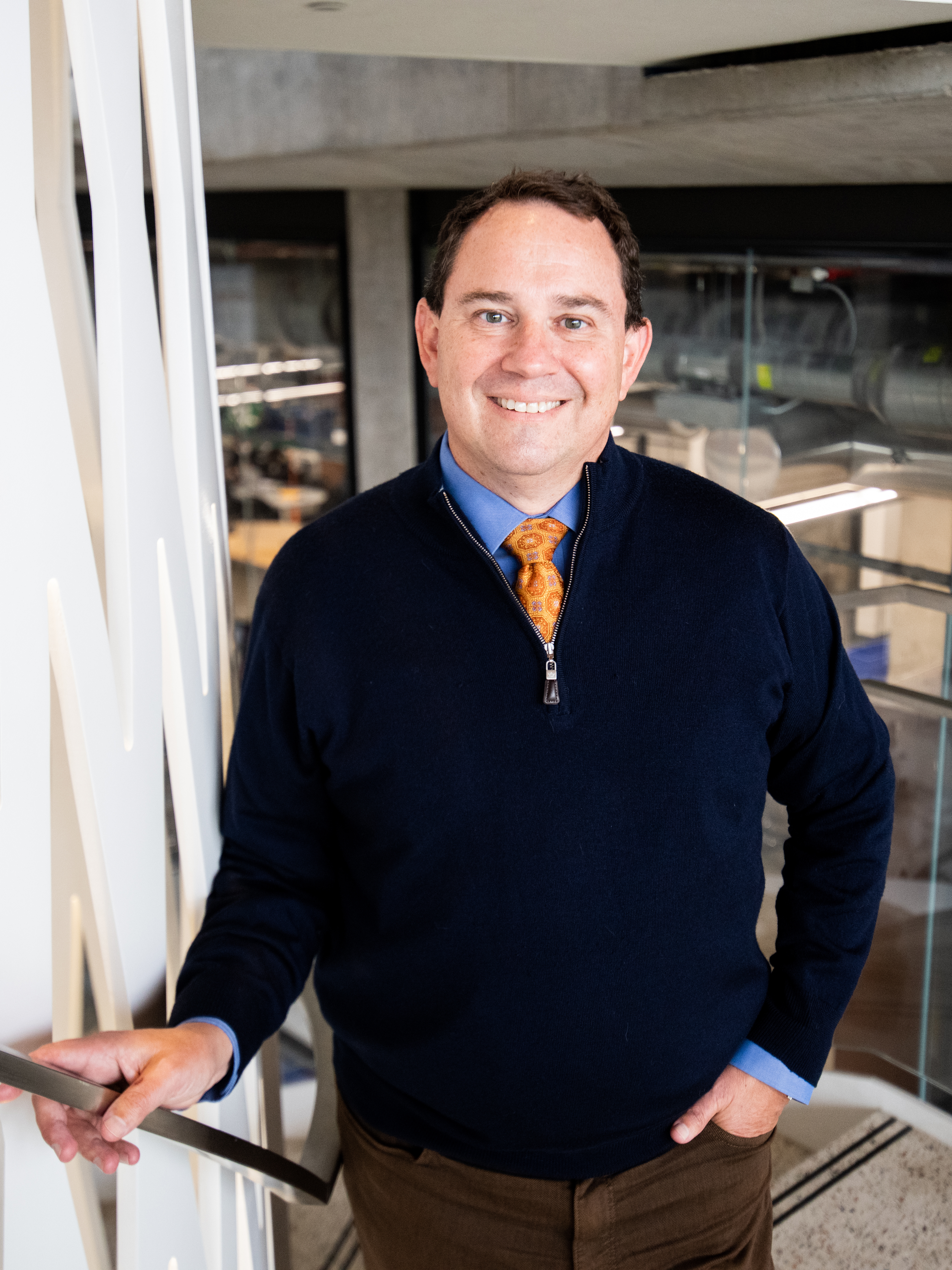
- Born: 1971 (age 54–55); Austin, Texas
- Education: Westlake High School
- Alma mater: University of Texas, B.S. and B.A. Stanford University, M.S. and Ph.D.
- Scientific career
- Fields: Energy Resources
- Institutions: University of Texas at Austin
- Thesis: (2001)

Michael Evan Webber (born 1971) is a professor of mechanical engineering at The University of Texas at Austin and the CTO of a clean-technology venture fund. Webber serves on the advisory board for Scientific American and is the author of Power Trip: The Story of Energy

== Biography ==
Webber was born in Austin, Texas, in 1971 to Stephen and Josephine Webber. His father was professor of Chemistry at the University of Texas at Austin and his mother a self-described bureaucrat. After graduating from Westlake High School in 1989, he attended the University of Texas at Austin where he played in the Longhorn Band, eventually serving as Drum Major. In 1995, he received a B.S. in Aerospace Engineering and a B.A. in Plan II Honors. He went to Stanford University in Palo Alto, California, to pursue a M.S. in mechanical engineering. He continued at Stanford where he was a National Science Foundation Fellow from 1995 to 1998. He completed his Ph.D. at Stanford in 2001 in mechanical engineering with a Ph.D. minor in electrical engineering with advisor Ron K. Hanson. He currently lives in Austin, TX, with his wife and children.

== Career ==
=== Corporate career ===
After completing his Ph.D., Webber shifted into private research first at Pranalytica and then at the RAND Corporation where he conducted research on energy and industrial topics. He currently holds six patents as a result of his innovations, mostly related to environmental monitoring and trace gas sensing. With the Austin Technology Incubator, Webber helped originate the Pecan Street Project in 2008. Now, Pecan Street Inc., a public private partnership, supports the innovation and development of smart grid solutions. He serves on the editorial board of advisors for Scientific American.

Webber has served in senior leadership positions in industry. From 2018 to 2021 he was Chief Science and Technology Officer of ENGIE Group in Paris. He later became Chief Technology Officer of Energy Impact Partners, a cleantech venture capital fund, from 2021 to 2024. Earlier in his career he worked at RAND Corporation (2004–2006), Pranalytica (2000–2004), and as a research fellow at NASA Ames Research Center.

== Academic career ==
Webber joined the University of Texas at Austin in 2006 as a research associate in mechanical engineering and was appointed assistant professor the following year. He was promoted to associate professor in 2012 and to full professor of mechanical engineering in 2016. In 2024 he also became professor of public affairs in the LBJ School of Public Affairs. Over the course of his career at UT Austin, he has held several endowed chairs and fellowships, including the Josey Centennial Fellow in Energy Resources (2012–2016), Josey Centennial Professor in Energy Resources (2016–2023), John J. McKetta Centennial Energy Chair in Engineering (2023–2025), Sid Richardson Chair in Public Affairs (2024–present), and the Cockrell Family Chair #16 in Mechanical Engineering (2025–present).

In addition to his teaching and research roles, Webber has directed or co-directed a interdisciplinary programs at UT Austin. These include service as associate director of the Center for International Energy and Environmental Policy (2006–2012), co-director of the Clean Energy Incubator (2009–2018), deputy director (2013–2018) and director (2018) of the Energy Institute, and engineering co-director of the Kay Bailey Hutchison Energy Center beginning in 2023.

=== Professional service ===
Webber has served on numerous professional, industrial, and governmental committees. At the national level, he was a member of the Roundtable on Science and Technology for Sustainability at the U.S. National Academies from 2012 to 2018, and previously served on the National Research Council’s Committee on Transitions to Alternative Vehicles and Fuels from 2011 to 2012. He has held editorial positions with several leading journals and publications, including membership on the editorial boards of Progress in Energy (2018–present) and Environmental Research Letters (2008–2020). He was editor-in-chief of Current Sustainable/Renewable Energy Reports (2013–2018), a member of the Board of Advisers for Scientific American (2009–2018), a contributing editor for Earth Magazine (2007–2018), and a contributing author to ASME’s Mechanical Engineering magazine.

He has been a member of the Independent Expert Panel of the Open Hydrogen Initiative since 2023 and serves on the Technical Review Panel of the Energy Systems Integration Division at the National Renewable Energy Laboratory beginning in 2021. He has also been a board member of Sustainable America since 2013, served on the board of Pecan Street Inc. from 2018 to 2022, and was a board member of Engineering One Planet from 2020 to 2022.

== Works ==
=== Scholarly works and research ===
Webber’s first book, Thirst for Power: Energy, Water and Human Survival, was published in 2016 by Yale University Press and was later adapted into a one-hour documentary film broadcast nationally on PBS. His second major book, Power Trip: The Story of Energy, appeared in 2019 with Basic Books and was accompanied by a 12-part companion television series over two seasons that premiered on PBS, Amazon Prime, and Apple TV on Earth Day 2020.

He has also published Powering Humanity: Essays on Energy and Society (2022), The Future of Buildings, Transportation and Power (2010, with Roger Duncan), From Athletics to Engineering: 8 Ways to Support Diversity, Equality, and Inclusion for All (2021, with Johnnie Johnson), and Changing the Way America Thinks About Energy: A Compendium of Commentary (2017). In addition, he has developed interactive educational materials, including the open-access textbooks Energy 101 and Resourcefulness: An Introduction to the Water-Energy Nexus.

Webber’s research and publications span energy technology, policy, and commercialization, with a focus on grid reliability, electrification, hydrogen systems, the built environment, and the food energy water waste nexus. He has authored or co-authored more than 600 scientific publications, written The New York Times, The Wall Street Journal, The Washington Post, and Scientific American, and holds six patents. His scholarly articles have appeared in leading journals, including Science, Nature, and Environmental Science & Technology.

=== Media work ===
His book Power Trip was adapted into a 12-part documentary series that aired on PBS, Amazon Prime, and Apple TV, reaching more than 10 million viewers in more than 30 countries worldwide. His book Thirst for Power was also adapted into a feature-length documentary, broadcast nationally on PBS in 2025. In addition, he hosted the PBS special Energy at the Movies.

== Awards ==
- Energy Thought Leader: Higher Education, American Energy Society (2024)
- Fulbright Technical Specialist, U.S. Department of State (2024–2027)
- Fellow of ASME (2014)
- Presidential Leadership Scholar, 4th class (2018)
- Rockefeller Foundation Bellagio Residency (2022)
- American Fellow, German Marshall Fund
- Four University of Texas teaching awards

== Selected publications and speeches ==
Over his career, Webber has published more than 400 articles, columns, reports, commentaries, and books and delivered more than 200 lectures, speeches, and seminars.

=== Books ===
- Webber, M. E. (2024). Powering humanity: Essays on energy and society. Book Baby. (eBook released December 18, 2023; print edition February 14, 2024).
- Johnson, J., & Webber, M. E. (2021). From athletics to engineering: 8 ways to support diversity, equity, and inclusion for all. Johnber Multimedia.
- Duncan, R. D., & Webber, M. E. (2020). The future of buildings, transportation and power.
- M. E. Webber. Thirst for Power: Energy, Water, and Human Survival (2016)
- M.E. Webber, Power Trip: The Story of Energy, Basic Books, February 5, 2019.
- Webber, M. E. (2009). Changing the way America thinks about energy. Petroleum Extension (PETEX), The University of Texas at Austin.
- Cotton, S. K., Petersohn, U., Dunigan, M., Burkhart, Q., Zander-Cotugno, M., O’Connell, E., & Webber, M. E. (2010). Hired guns: Views about armed contractors in Operation Iraqi Freedom. RAND Corporation.
- M. E. Webber. Changing the Way America Thinks About Energy, Petroleum Teaching Extension (PETEX), The University of Texas at Austin (2009)

=== Select Peer-Reviewed Journal Articles ===
M.E. Webber, D.S. Baer, and R.K. Hanson, "Ammonia Monitoring Near 1.5 μm with Diode Laser Absorption Sensors," Applied Optics, 40(12), pp. 2031– 2042, 2001

C.W. King and M.E. Webber, "Water Intensity of Transportation," Environmental Science and Technology, 42(21), pp 7866–7872 (7pp) (September 24, 2008)

A.D. Cuellar and M.E. Webber, "Cow Power: The Energy and Emissions Benefits of Converting Manure to Biogas," Environmental Research Letters, 3 034002 (8pp) July 2008.

J.S. Vitter and M.E. Webber, "Water Event Disaggregation Using Sub-metered Water and Coincident Electricity Data," Water 10, 714. https://doi:10.3390/w10060714

Y.R. Glazer, F.T. Davidson, J.J. Lee, and M.E. Webber, "An Inventory and Engineering Assessment of Flared Gas and Liquid Waste Streams From Hydraulic Fracturing in the USA," Current Sustainable/Renewable Energy Reports, October 2017.
