= William Hughes Mearns =

American poet

Hughes Mearns
- Born: William Hughes Mearns; September 28, 1875; Philadelphia, Pennsylvania, US
- Died: March 13, 1965 (aged 89); Bearsville, New York, US
- Education: Harvard University; University of Pennsylvania
- Occupations: Educator, poet
- Spouse: Mabel Gledhill Fagley
- Children: 1

William Hughes Mearns (September 28, 1875 – March 13, 1965), better known as Hughes Mearns, was an American educator and poet. A graduate of Harvard University and the University of Pennsylvania, Mearns is remembered as the author of the poem "Antigonish" (or "The Little Man Who Wasn't There"). However, his ideas about encouraging the natural creativity of children, particularly those age 3 through 8, were novel at the time. It has been written about him that, "He typed notes of their conversations; he learned how to make them forget there was an adult around; never asked them questions and never showed surprise no matter what they did or said."

== Career ==
Mearns was a professor at the Philadelphia School of Pedagogy from 1905 to 1920. Starting in 1920, he served as head of the Lincoln School Teachers College at Columbia University. He was a proponent of John Dewey's work in progressive education.

Mearns wrote two influential books: Creative Youth 1925 and Creative Power 1929. Essayist Gabriel Gudding credits those books with "[lighting] a fuse" under the teaching of creative writing, influencing a generation of scholars.

== Antigonish ==
Mearns is credited with the well-known rhyme, composed in 1899 as a song for a play he had written called The Psyco-ed. The play was performed in 1910, and the poem was first published as "Antigonish" in 1922.

Yesterday upon the stair
I met a man who wasn’t there
He wasn’t there again today
I wish, I wish he’d go away

When I came home last night at three
The man was waiting there for me
But when I looked around the hall
I couldn’t see him there at all!
Go away, go away, don’t you come back any more!
Go away, go away, and please don’t slam the door

Last night I saw upon the stair
A little man who wasn’t there
He wasn’t there again today
Oh, how I wish he’d go away

"Antigonish" (1899)

Mearns also wrote many parodies of this poem, entitled Later Antigonishes, such as "Alibi":

As I was falling down the stair
I met a bump that wasn't there;
It might have put me on the shelf
Except I wasn't there myself.

== Other works ==
- Richard Richard. Illustrated by Ralph L Boyer. Philadelphia: Penn Publishing. 1916.
- The Vinegar Saint. Illustrated by Ralph L Boyer. Philadelphia: The Penn Publishing Company. 1919.
- I Ride in My Coach. Illustrated by W T Schwartz. Philadelphia: The Penn Publishing Company. 1923.
- Night Goblins. Illustrated by Ralph L. Boyer. 1923.
- H. D. - One of the Pamphlet Poets. New York: Simon & Schuster. 1926.
- Lions in the Way. New York: Simon and Schuster. 1927.
- Edna St. Vincent Millay. Hughes Mearns (Editor). New York: Simon & Schuster. 1927.
- St. Vincent Millay, Edna (1927). The Pamphlet Poets. Hughes Mearns (Introduction). New York: Simon and Schuster.
- The Creative Adult. New York: Doubleday, Doran & Co. 1940.
- Smith, Gibbs M. (2016). All Hallows' Eve: A Haunting Companion. Hughes Mearns (Contributor). Gibbs Smith. p. 64.

== Personal life ==
Mearns was born on September 28, 1875, in Philadelphia, the son of James H Mearns and Lelia Cora (née Evans).

On December 22, 1904, he married Mabel Gledhill Fagley at St Mark's Church, Philadelphia. They had a daughter.

Mearns died on March 13, 1965, in Bearsville, New York.
