= Texas Fight =

Fight song for the University of Texas

"Texas Fight" is the official fight song of the University of Texas at Austin and was written by Colonel Walter S. Hunnicutt in collaboration with James E. King, then director of the Marlin High School Band. The words, as finally adopted by the school, were written by Burnett "Blondie" Pharr, the director of the Longhorn Band from 1917 to 1937.

It is sung to a fast tempo version of "Taps", a song played at many military funerals. "Texas Fight" is played following touchdowns and extra points at University of Texas (UT) football games, other Longhorn sports events, as well as on other occasions of celebration. The repeated strain contains portions of "The Eyes of Texas," the school's alma mater. It is also played at Austin-Bergstrom International Airport at the top of every hour.

== History and usage ==
Hunnicutt wrote "Texas Fight" in response to the song used by their longtime rivals, Texas A&M University. One of the Aggie songs then was Farmers Fight, which consisted of the words "Farmers Fight" sung to "Taps", a song played at many military funerals. Impressed by the song, Hunnicutt figured he would write "Texas Fight" also sung to "Taps", but making the song more march-like and having "Texas" throughout instead of "Farmers." In 1952, Hunnitcutt, stated that "[he] wrote 'Texas Fight'... in an attempt to counteract the songs and yells of the Texas Aggies, which were not too complimentary to our Student Body and some of which tended to ridicule 'The Eyes of Texas'."

The words of the song as finally adopted were written by Burnett "Blondie" Pharr, director of the Longhorn Band from 1917 to 1937. "Texas Fight" is played following touchdowns and extra points at University of Texas (UT) football games, other Longhorn sports events, as well as on other occasions of celebration.

The repeated strain contains portions of "The Eyes of Texas," the school's alma mater. This modification was made in the summer of 1967 at the suggestion of Charles "Buster" Griffith, a member of the trumpet section, and was premiered - unannounced - at the first football game that fall, after which it became tradition.

== Lyrics ==
The wording of the song is as follows.

Texas Fight, Texas Fight,
And it's goodbye to A&M.
Texas Fight, Texas Fight,
And we'll put over one more win.
Texas Fight, Texas Fight,
For it's Texas that we love best.
Hail, Hail, The gang's all here,
And it's good-bye to all the rest! (YELL)

Yea Orange! Yea White!
Yea Longhorns! Fight! Fight! Fight!
Texas Fight! Texas Fight,
Yea Texas Fight!
Texas Fight! Texas Fight,
Yea Texas Fight!

The Eyes of Texas are upon you,
All the livelong day.
The Eyes of Texas are upon you,
You cannot get away.
Texas Fight, Texas Fight,
For it's Texas that we love best.
Hail, Hail, The gang's all here,
And it's good-bye to all the rest!

=== Alternate Lyrics ===
"Hail, Hail, the gang's all here" is rarely, if ever, sung in modern practice. It is almost always replaced with "Give 'em hell, give 'em hell! Go, Horns, go!" Another version often used at football games, particularly by students, is "Give 'em hell, give 'em hell! Make 'em eat shit!"., which was intended originally as a jab at the Arkansas Razorbacks. Another version used at the annual Texas-OU game is "Give 'em hell, give 'em hell! OU sucks!" In a commercial for ESPN's College GameDay, Kirk Herbstreit improvised "Yeah, we're Texas, just north of Mexico. Home of the armadillo, black gold and El Arroyo..." before Longhorns coach Mack Brown says, "we don't freestyle 'Texas Fight', Big Boy." The A&M in "And it's goodbye to A&M" is often replaced by the current opponent of Texas if it is not A&M.
