= Antigonish (poem) =

1899 William Hughes Mearns poem

"Antigonish" is a poem by the American educator and poet William Hughes Mearns, written in 1899. It is also known as "The Little Man Who Wasn't There" or "The Man Who Wasn't There", and has been adapted in song under the former title.

== History of the verse ==
Inspired by reports of a ghost of a man roaming the stairs of a haunted house in Antigonish, Nova Scotia, Canada, the poem was originally part of a play called The Psyco-ed, which William Hughes Mearns had written for an English class at Harvard University, circa 1899. In 1910, Mearns staged the play with the Plays and Players, an amateur theatrical group, and on March 27, 1922, the newspaper columnist F.P.A. printed the poem in "The Conning Tower", his column in the New York World. Mearns subsequently wrote many parodies of this poem, giving them the general title of Later Antigonishes.

== Editions of the verse ==
Yesterday, upon the stair,
I met a man who wasn't there!
He wasn't there again today,
I wish, I wish he'd go away!

When I came home last night at three,
The man was waiting there for me
But when I looked around the hall,
I couldn't see him there at all!
Go away, go away, don't you come back any more!
Go away, go away, and please don't slam the door... (slam!)

Last night I saw upon the stair,
A little man who wasn't there
He wasn't there again today
Oh, how I wish he'd go away....

== In popular culture ==
In 1939, "Antigonish" was adapted as a popular song titled "The Little Man Who Wasn't There", by Harold Adamson with music by Bernie Hanighen, both of whom received the songwriting credits.

In 1939, two other notable big band recordings of the song were Larry Clinton & His Orchestra with vocals by Ford Leary and, Bob Crosby & His Orchestra with vocals by Teddy Grace.

Antigonish is believed to have partially inspired the lyrics for David Bowie's 1970 track "The Man Who Sold the World," which describes an encounter "upon the stairs" between Bowie (who "wasn't there") and the titular figure.

The Coen Brothers film, The Man Who Wasn't There, was given its title based on the poem.

== See also ==
- Extensional and intensional definitions
- Plato's beard
- The Man Who Sold the World (song), a song by David Bowie
