= Aedh Wishes for the Cloths of Heaven =

1899 poem by William Butler Yeats

- by William Butler Yeats
- First published in: 1899
- Language: English

Full text
- He wishes for the Cloths of Heaven at Wikisource

"Aedh Wishes for the Cloths of Heaven", also known as "He Wishes for the Cloths of Heaven" in later publications, is a poem by William Butler Yeats. It was published in 1899 in his third volume of poetry, The Wind Among the Reeds.

== Commentary ==
The speaker of the poem is the character Aedh, who appears in Yeats's work alongside two other archetypal characters of the poet's myth: Michael Robartes and Red Hanrahan. The three characters, according to Yeats, represent the "principles of the mind;" whereas Robartes is intellectually powerful and Hanrahan represents Romantic primitivism, Aedh is pale, lovelorn, and in the thrall of La belle dame sans merci.

== Text ==
Had I the heavens' embroidered cloths,
Enwrought with golden and silver light,
The blue and the dim and the dark cloths
Of night and light and the half light,
I would spread the cloths under your feet:
But I, being poor, have only my dreams;
I have spread my dreams under your feet;
Tread softly because you tread on my dreams.

== Cultural influence ==
=== Landmark ===
There is a blue plaque dedicated to Yeats at Balscadden House in Howth near Dublin, which was his cottage home from 1880 to 1883. The plaque contains the last couplet from the poem.

=== Art and literature ===
The poem appears as a recurrent metaphor in the relationship between a father and son in William Nicholson's novel The Secret Intensity of Everyday Life (2009). Furthermore, the poem is quoted in Chris Killip's photographic book In Flagrante (1988) and John Irving's A Widow for One Year (1998). The final couplet also appears in Brian Friel's The Loves of Cass McGuire.

=== Music ===
The poem has been set to music by many composers and musical groups, including Thomas Dunhill (1904), John Tavener (1983), Z. Randall Stroope (1984), Ivor Gurney, Dave Stewart and Barbara Gaskin (1991), Virginia Astley (1996), Claire Roche (1998), Richard B. Evans (1999), Howard Skempton (2004), North Sea Radio Orchestra (2006), Tosca (2009), Alan Bullard (2010), Tiny Ruins and Hamish Kilgour (2015), the Blue Devils Drum and Bugle Corps (2022) and Celestria (2026).

=== Film and television ===
The poem is featured in the films 84 Charing Cross Road (1987), Equilibrium (2002), Dasepo Naughty Girls (2006), as well as in the Ballykissangel episode "Amongst Friends" (1998) and in the second series of Rivals (2026) where it is recited by Delcan O'Hara, who is making a documentary about Yeats.

== See also ==
- 1899 in poetry
