= Claire Roche =

Musician

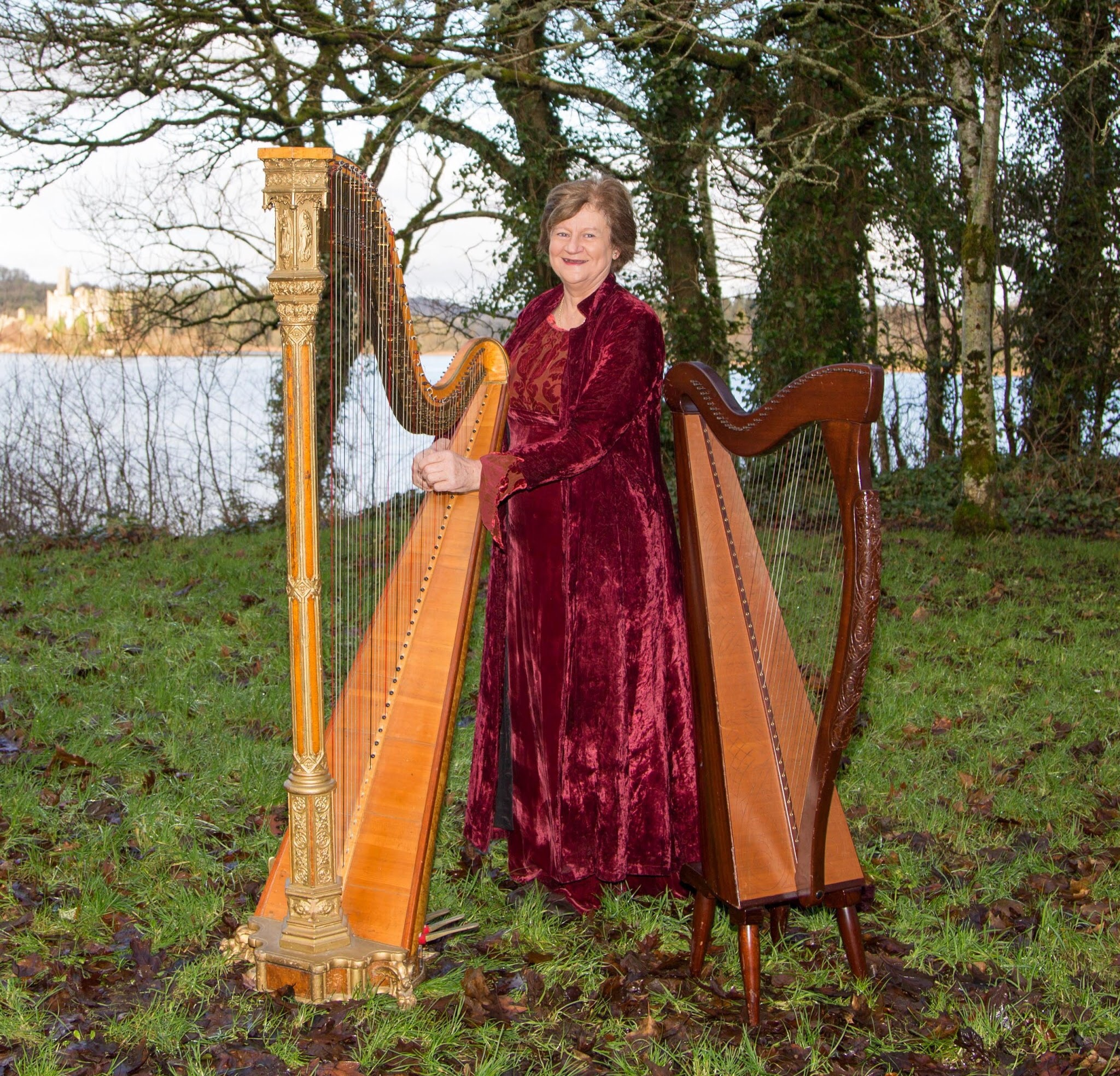
Claire Roche at Lough Key Forest Park, Co. Roscommon, Ireland

Claire Roche is a singer harpist based in County Dublin, Ireland. She plays the concert harp as well as the Irish harp. Roche has performed as an opening artist for The Chieftains and The Fureys and has performed at venues including The Florida Folk Festival in White Springs, Florida, and at Stephen Foster Memorial Park, on the banks of the Suwannee River in the Southern United States and at Old Government House, Parramatta in Australia.

== Recordings ==
- Dancing in the Wind: poetry of W.B. Yeats set to music
- Lilt of the Banshee: traditional Irish, Welsh and English songs, tunes and poetry set to music
- Songs of Love & Loss: haunting originals
- Out of the Ordinary
- An Irish Wedding Ceremony
