= Frances Laughton Mace =

American poet (1836–1899)

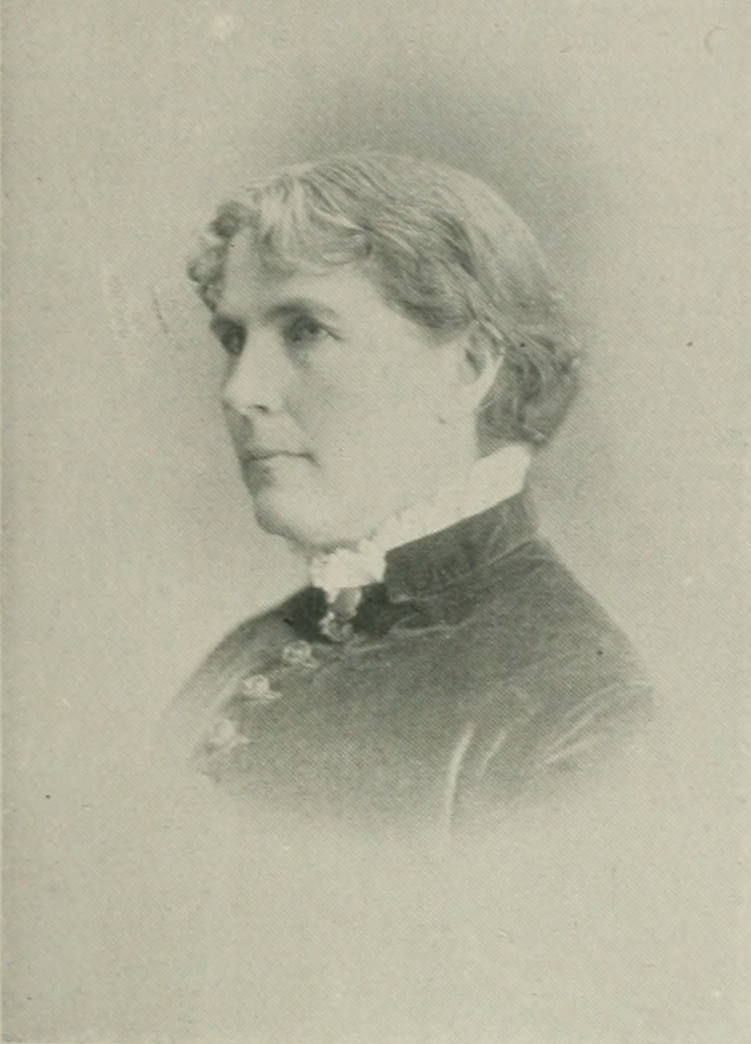
- Photo in A Woman of the Century
- Born: Frances Parker Laughton; January 15, 1836; Orono, Maine, U.S.
- Died: July 20, 1899 (aged 63); Los Gatos, California, U.S.
- Occupation: Writer
- Spouse: Ernest Warner Arnold (m. 1886)
- Writing career
- Pen name: Inez
- Notable work: "Only Waiting"

Frances Laughton Mace (née Frances Parker Laughton; pen name: Inez; January 15, 1836 – July 20, 1899) was an American poet. Her poems first appeared in The Journal of Commerce. She was best remembered for the poem and hymn "Only Waiting", written when she was 18, and published in the Waterville Mail. Its authorship, for a time, was confused. The work was included in her volume Legends, Lyrics, and Sonnets (Boston, 1883). Her later work was included in Under Pine and Palm (1888) and Wild Roses of Maine (1896).

== Early life and education ==
Frances Parker Laughton was born in Orono, Maine, January 15, 1836. Her father was Dr. Sumner Laughton. Her grandfather, John Laughton, was one of the early settlers of Norridgewock, Maine. Her siblings included Edward Sumner (born 1838), Henry Herbert, and Frederick Malvern (born 1844).

In 1837, the family moved to Foxcroft where she was educated. At the age of 10, she studied Latin and other advanced subjects. At the age of 12, she wrote verses that were published. Some of them appeared in the New York "Journal of Commerce." After the family moved to Bangor, she took courses in German and music with private teachers, and graduated from Bangor High School in 1852. Of her early years, she recollected, "Mine was a silent dreamy childhood haunted by visions of impossible poems."

== Career ==
At the age of 18, Mace published her best-known hymn, "Only Waiting till the shadows" in the Waterville, Maine Mail, under the signature "Inez", the text of which was developed after a friend's recital of the story of a very aged man at the alms-house, who, being asked what he was doing now, replied, "Only waiting!" Her hymn became popular in the United States and Britain, and its authorship was disputed, by a certain U.S. woman, whose right for a time was almost unquestioned. In 1878, 25 years after its first appearance, full proofs of Mace's authorship were accepted by Dr. James Martineau.

In 1855, she married Benjamin F. Mace, a lawyer of Bangor, remaining in that city until 1885, when they removed to San Jose, California, residing at Palmtree Lodge. Four of her eight children died young. After the eighth child turned two, she began writing again after a quiet period of about 20 years. "Israfil" appeared, with illustrations, in Harper's Magazine, gaining for her quick recognition and advancing her toward the front rank of singers. After that, her poems found place in the leading magazines and journals, including Century, Atlantic, and Lippincott's.

In 1883, she published a collection of poems in a volume entitled Legends, Lyrics and Sonnets, soon followed by a second edition, enlarged and extended. In 1888, a volume of work was published with the title Under Pine and Palm, adding to her reputation.

== Death ==
Frances Laughton Mace died in Los Gatos, California on July 20, 1899, aged 63. (Note: According to Appleton (1900), Mace died in August 1899.)

== Literary review ==
In Cottage Hearth: A Magazine of Home Arts and Home Culture of 1885, Augusta Moore spoke up regarding the poem, "Only Waiting":—

More than thirty years ago a young lady, daughter of Dr. Laughton, of Bangor, Maine, and now known as Frances Laughton Mace, wrote the beautiful lyric " Only Waiting," beginning as follows: Only waiting till the shadows Arc a little longer grown, Only waiting till the glimmer Of the day's last beam is flown. It was in 1850 when Miss Laughton, then a young girl, was paid the very highest prices on our list for her poetic contributions to our columns, and our readers have welcomed everything that else come from her pen in all the years since that date. During the last few years the Harpers' have published in their magazine many choice poems written by Mrs. Mace, and the volume of her poems published at Boston has found a ready sale, exhausting more than one edition. A few years ago a Western woman, now Known as Mrs. F. A. F. Wood-White, who has written some verses, or at least published some over her own name, and is at present engaged in some literary work at Chicago, gave out to the world that she was the author of "Only Waiting," and it was published as her composition. We exposed the misstatement at the time, and several publishers who had been imposed on by the assumption corrected their error. We are very much astonished to learn that a work just issued by D. Lothrop & Co., entitled " Women in Sacred Song," edited by Mrs. G. C. Smith of Springfield, Ill., again ascribes this " world-renowned Only Waiting " to Mrs. Wood-White, and appends a note from her in which she insists that it is her composition. There is no foundation whatever for her statement, but like the woman who insisted that she wrote William Allen Butler's "Nothing to Wear," she has probably told the falsehood so often that she has come to believe it herself, and has succeeded in imposing upon others so as to make them participators in her folly.

== Selected works ==
- A poem, 1880
- Legends, lyrics and sonnets, 1883
- Under pine and palm, 1887
- Wild Roses of Maine, 1896

=== Hymns ===
- "In counting all the precious boons"
- "Only waiting till the shadows"
- "Throw open the gates"
