= Sarah and Ernest Butler School of Music =

Music school of the University of Texas at Austin

Coordinates: 30°17′15″N 97°43′50″W

The Sarah and Ernest Butler School of Music is a department-level school within the College of Fine Arts at the University of Texas at Austin.

With over 100 faculty members and more than 750 students, it ranks among the top 3% of music institutions in the country by size and is recognized as one of the best public music schools.

Founded in 1914, the school began offering graduate courses in 1924. By 1938, it had grown to a faculty of nine, led by Dr. Ezra William Doty, and began offering doctoral degrees.

Present facilities date to 1968 with the construction of Music Building East. In 1980 construction of Music Recital Hall, now known as Bates Recital Hall, seating 700, was added to Music Building East, united the entire school in one building complex. McCullough Theatre, seating 400, is used by the Butler Opera Center and other concerts and Jessen Auditorium, in the old Music Building across campus, seating 300, is used for recitals and chamber music concerts. The Butler School is led by Dr. Mary Ellen Poole.

== Sarah and Ernest Butler ==
The School of Music was renamed in honor of the Butlers following 25 years of philanthropic support to the school and a donation of $55 million in the spring of 2008. The endowment is one of the largest ever given by private donors to a university, and is the second largest for a music school (second only to the Yale School of Music).

As stated in the official University of Texas press release (dated March 18, 2008):

"Since 1983, the Butlers have created nine endowments in the School of Music to support students, faculty and programs. In 2004, the School of Music named its opera program after the couple in appreciation of their $2 million endowment for the opera theatre program."

As of January 2020, much of the Butlers' $55 million endowment to the music school remains outstanding, as one of the conditions attached to their donation was that the music school become autonomous from the College of Fine Arts. This has led to tension with the administration of the university and the forced resignation in 2012 of the music school's director, Prof. Glenn Chandler.

Dr. Butler is a retired physician, who specialized in otolaryngology [ear, nose, and throat]. He is a member of Board of the Austin Symphony Orchestra, and past treasurer and trustee of the Texas Medical Association Foundation. Mrs. Butler is chairwoman of the Ballet Austin Board of Directors, a member of the Blanton Museum Council, and a member of the university's Development Board. The Butlers are members of the university's Chancellor's Council, President's Associates and the Texas Exes.
