= Latin Grammy Award for Best Classical Contemporary Composition =

Music award category

- Awarded for: A newly recorded original classical composition. Award to the Composer.
- Country: United States
- Presented by: The Latin Recording Academy
- First award: 2008
- Currently held by: Gabriela Ortiz for "Revolución Diamantina - Act I: The Sounds Cats Make, Act II: We Don't Love Each Other, Act III: Borders and Bodies, Act IV: Speaking the Unspeakable" (2025)
- Website: latingrammy.com

The Latin Grammy Award for Best Classical Contemporary Composition is an honor presented annually at the Latin Grammy Awards, a ceremony that recognizes excellence and promotes awareness of cultural diversity and contributions of Latin recording artists in the United States and internationally. I was first presented at the 9th Latin Grammy Awards ceremony, which took place at the Toyota Center in Houston, Texas.

The description of the category at the 2020 Latin Grammy Awards states that it is "for new vocal and instrumental recordings of original works or compositions that have been composed within the last twenty-five (25) years (a work/composition is not eligible if it was composed before 1995), and that were released for the first time during the Eligibility Period." The award goes to the composer(s) and not to the performer(s), unless they also participated in the composition of the piece. The category has been awarded ever since 2008 with the exception of 2019, when it was not presented.

Argentine composer Claudia Montero holds the record of most wins in this category followed by Argentine composer Carlos Franzetti with two victories.

== Recipients ==
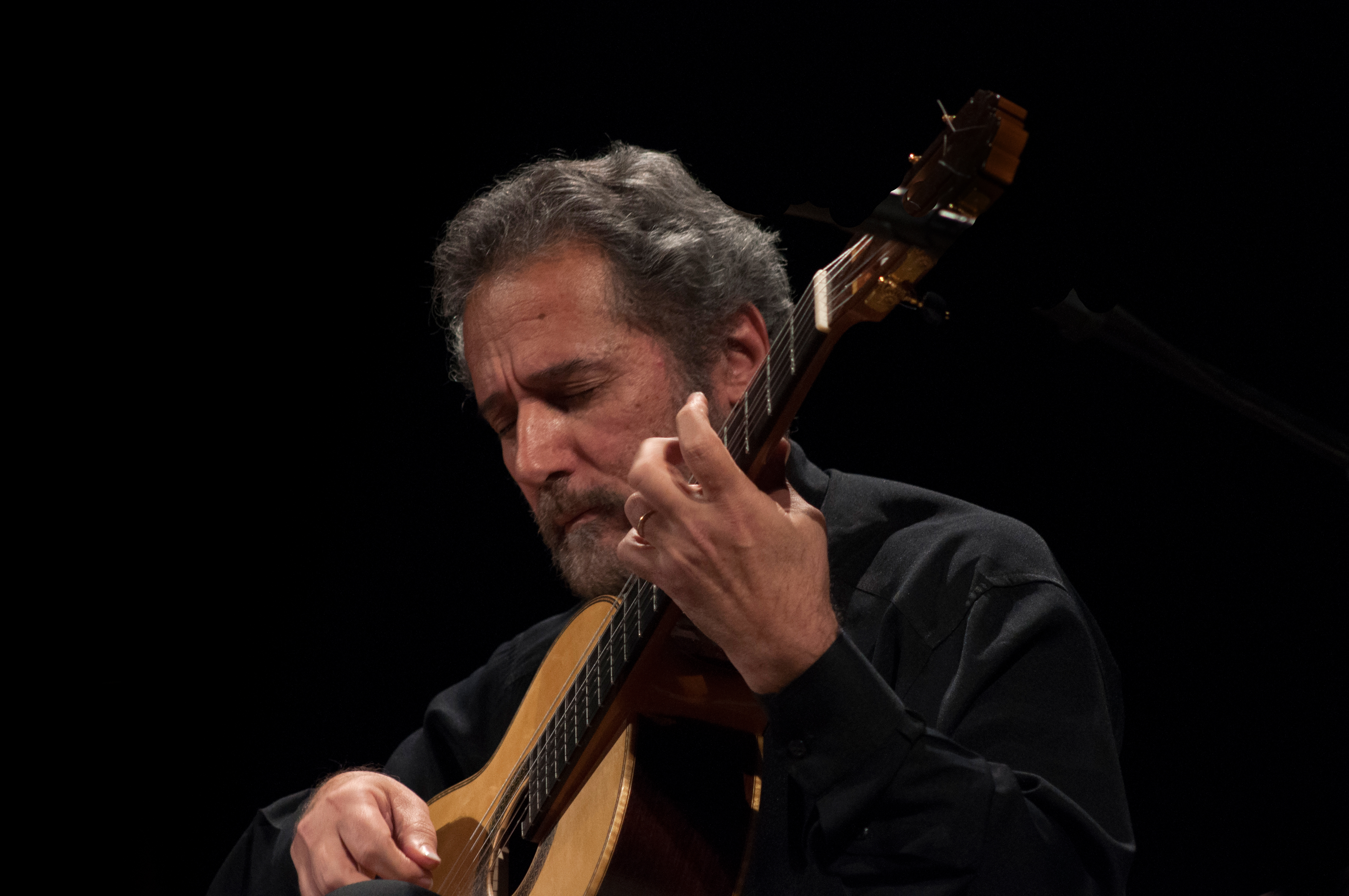
Two-time winner Sérgio Assad.

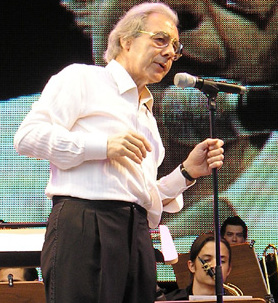
2010 winner Lalo Schifrin.

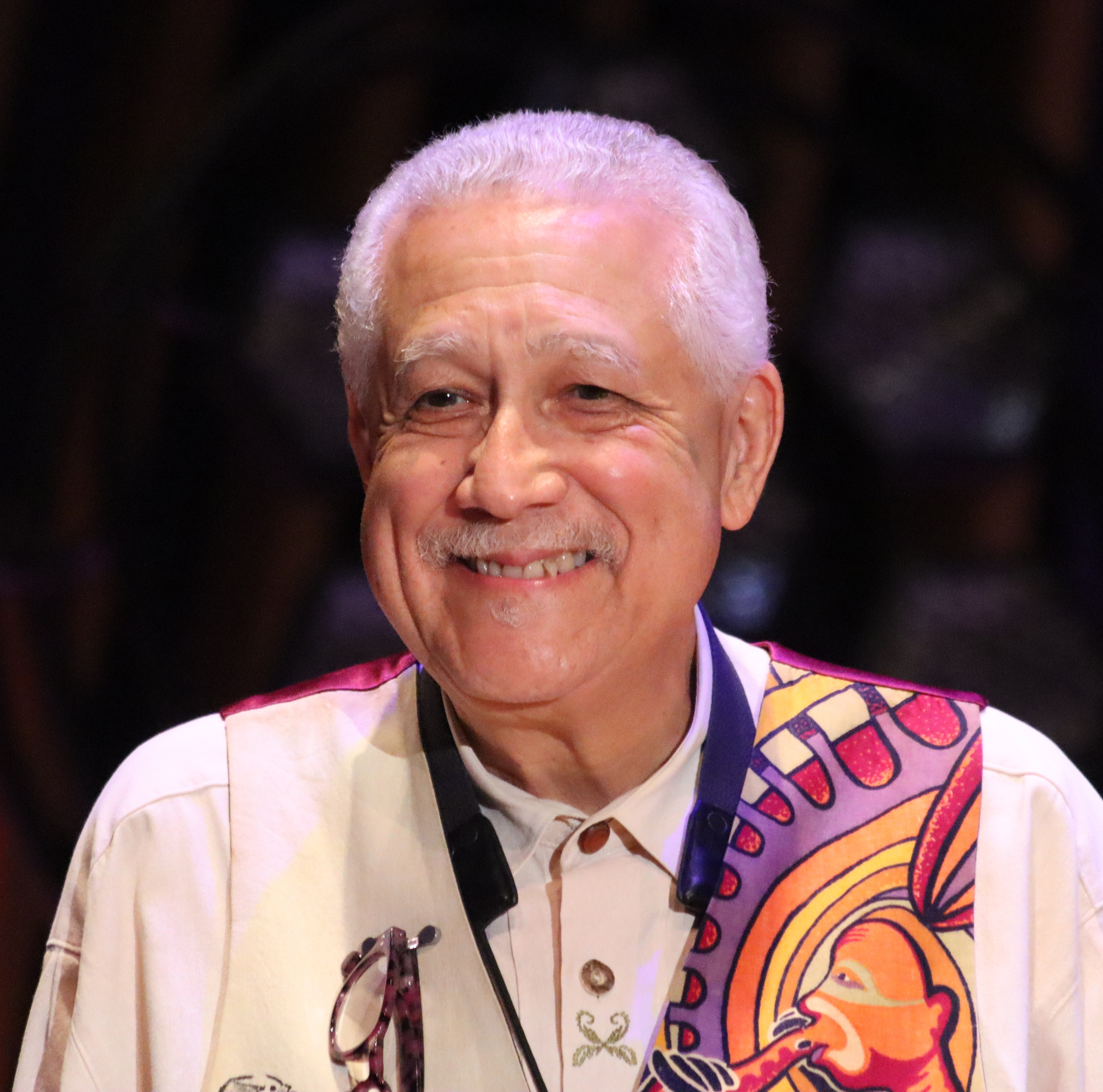
Two-time winner Paquito D'Rivera.

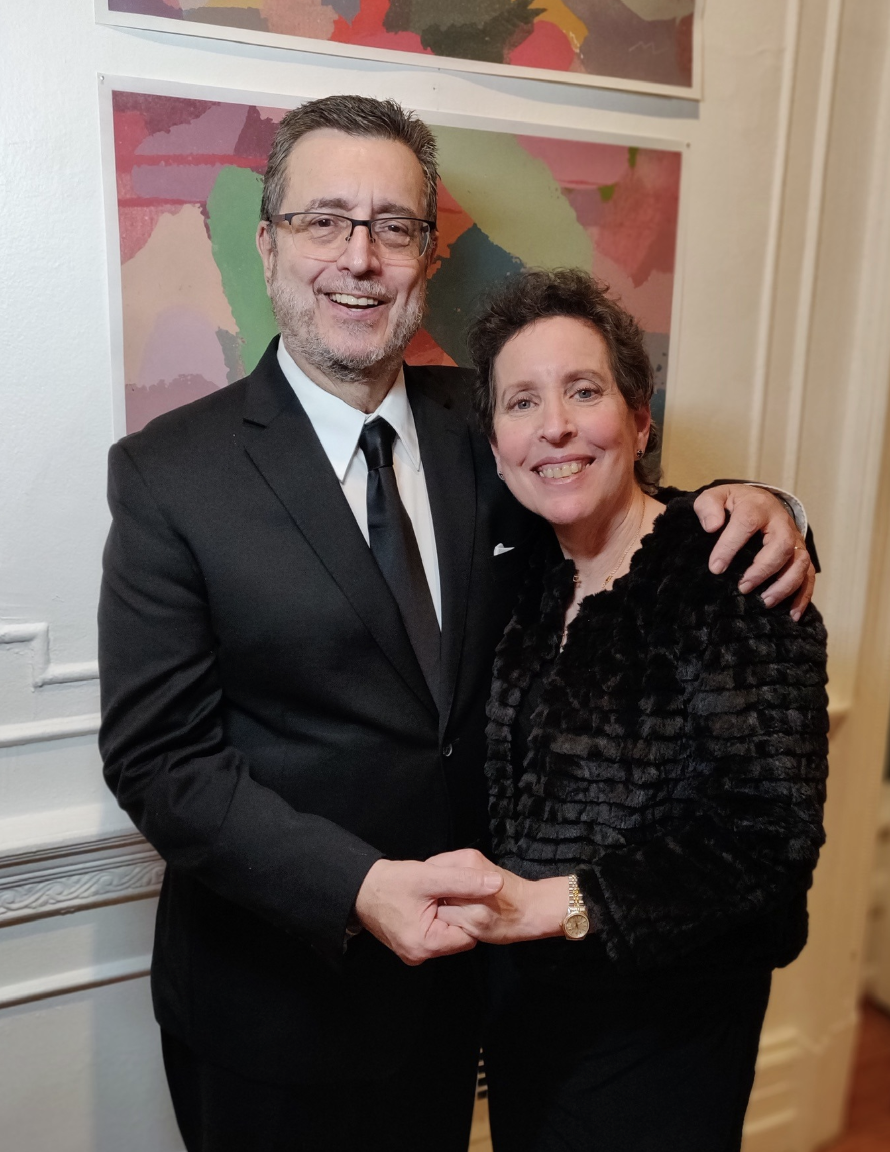
Two-time winner Carlos Franzetti.

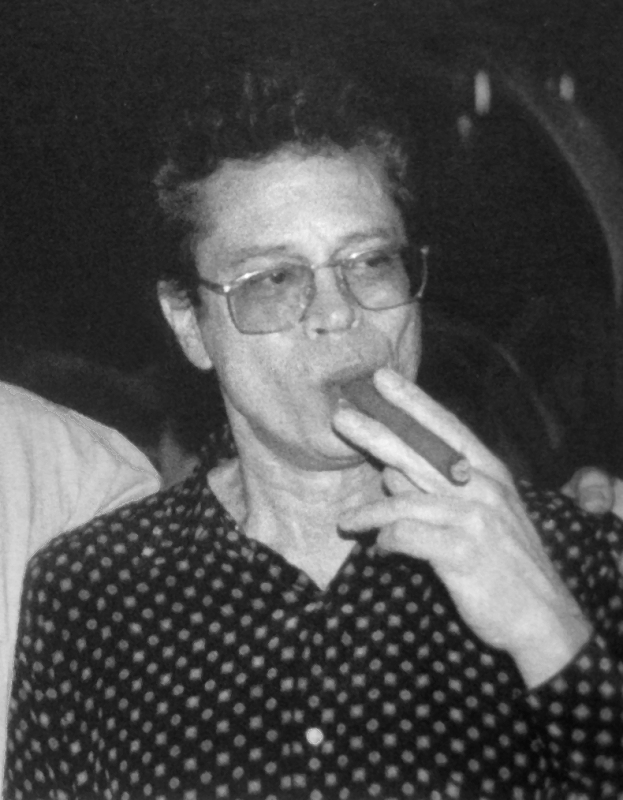
2017 winner Leo Brouwer.

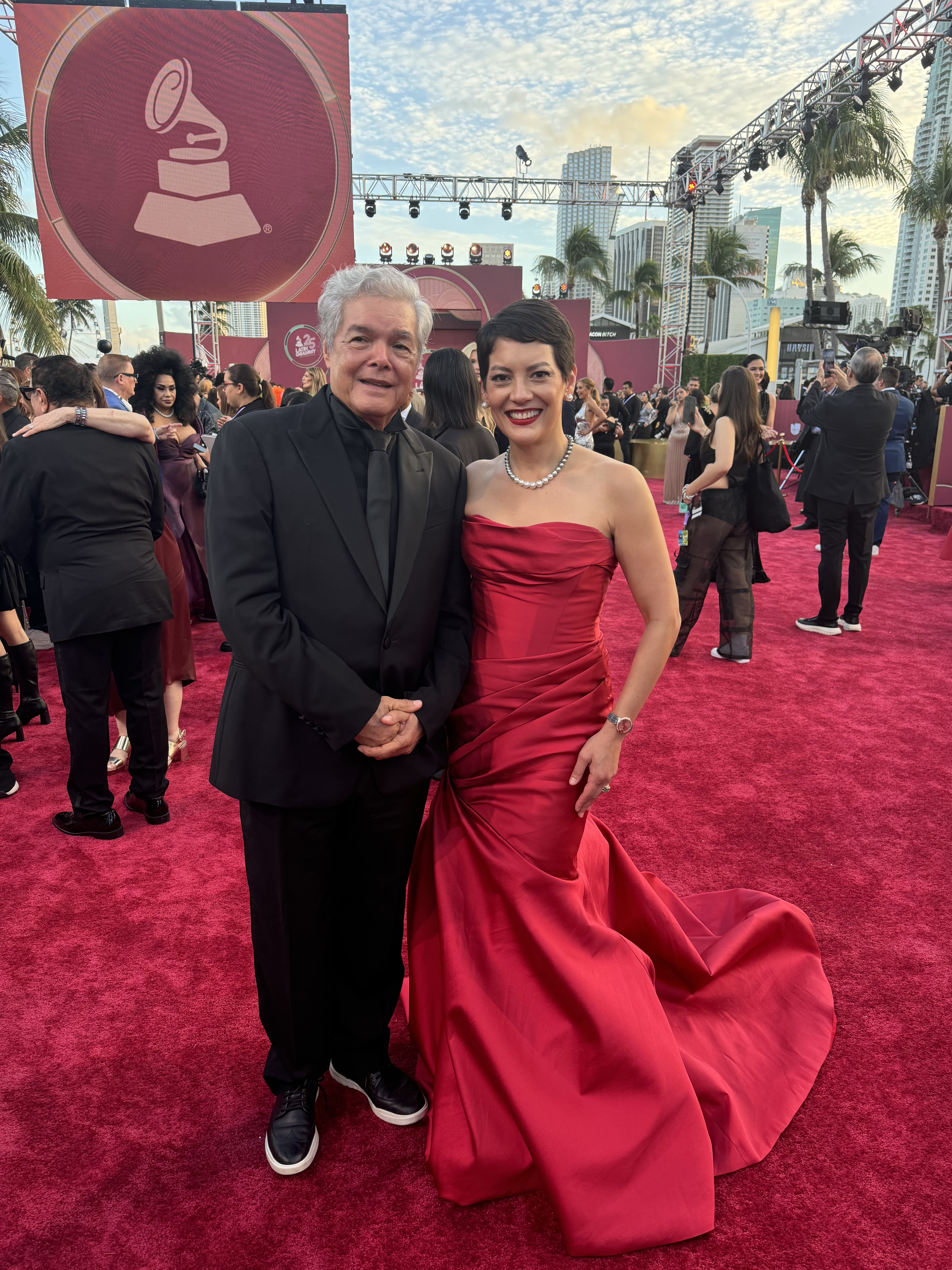
2024 winner Arturo Márquez.

Year	Recipient(s)	Work	Performing artist(s)	Nominees	Ref.
2008	Carlos José Castro	"Concierto del sol"	Mario Ulloa, Orquesta Filarmónica de Costa Rica	Jorge Liderman – "Barcelonazo" (Jorge Liderman); Roberto Valera – "Non divisi" (Camerata Romeu); Aurelio de la Vega – "Variación del recuerdo" (The North/South Chamber Orchestra)	
2008	Sérgio Assad	"Tahhiyya li ossoulina"	Sérgio and Odair Assad	Jorge Liderman – "Barcelonazo" (Jorge Liderman); Roberto Valera – "Non divisi" (Camerata Romeu); Aurelio de la Vega – "Variación del recuerdo" (The North/South Chamber Orchestra)	
2009	Gabriela Lena Frank	"Inca Dances"	Manuel Barrueco and Cuarteto Latinoamericano	Orlando Jacinto Garcia – "Cuatro asimetrias para el cuarteto de guitarras de Asturias entre Quatret" (Orlando Jacinto Garcia); Clarice Assad – "Danças nativas" (Aquarelle Guitar Quartet); Roberto Sierra – "Variations on a Souvenir" (Roberto Sierra); Alfonso Fuentes – "Voces del barrio" (Kathleen Jones)	
2010	Lalo Schifrin	"Pampas"	Antonio Lysy	Miguel del Águila – "Clocks" (Miguel del Águila); Sergio Assad – "Interchange-For Guitar Quartet and Orchestra" (Los Angeles Guitar Quartet, David Amado and The Delaware Symphony Orchestra); Sergio Assad – "Maracaípe" (Beijing Guitar Duo); Orlando Jacinto Garcia – "Silencios imaginados" (Nodus Ensemble); Tania León – "To and Fro (4 MOODS)" (Nodus Ensemble)	
2011	Paquito D'Rivera	"Panamericana Suite"	Paquito D'Rivera	Javier Álvarez – "Le repas du serpent" (Iracema de Andrade); Orlando Jacinto García – "Mixtura" (Iracema de Andrade); Lalo Schifrin – "Romerías" (Sergio Puccini); Sergio Roberto de Oliveira – "Umas coisas do coração (i- Agitado)" (Armildo Uzeda)	
2012	Yalil Guerra	"Seducción"	Elizabeth Rebozo	Tania León – "Inura" (Tania León); Gustavo Casenave – "Miñoqui" (Gustavo Casenave); Aurelio de la Vega – "Preludio No. 1" (Elizabeth Rebozo); Leo Brouwer – "Quartet No. 4 - Rem tene verba sequentur (Know the Matter and the Word Will Follow)" (Havana String Quartet); Tim Rescala – "Quarteto Circular" (Tim Rescala); Carlos Franzetti – "Stringazo" (Cuartetango String Quartet)	
2013	Carlos Franzetti	"Zingaros"	Carlos Franzetti	Anderson Freire – "A igreja vem" (Anderson Freire); Rafael Piccolotto de Lima – "Abertura jobiniana" (Jeremy Fox conducting the Orquesta Sinfónica Nacional de Costa Rica); Gabriela Ortiz – "Elegía" (Southwest Chamber Music); Leo Brouwer – "String Quartet # 5" (The Havana String Quartet)	
2014	Claudia Montero	"Concierto para violín y orquesta de cuerdas"	Claudia Montero	Gustavo Casenave – "Bicho Feeling Home Piano Solo" (Gustavo Casenave); Arlene Sierra – "Moler" (Arlene Sierra); Yalil Guerra – "String Quartet No.2" (Yalil Guerra); Gabriela Ortiz – "¡Únicamente la verdad!, La auténtica historia de Camelia La Texana" (Gabriela Ortiz)	
2015	Carlos Franzetti	"Capriccio"	Carlos Franzetti	José Serebrier conducting the Málaga Philharmonic and the FIU Concert Choir – "Auschwitz (Nunca Se Olvidarán)" (Orlando Jacinto García); Miguel del Águila – "Concierto En Tango Op. 110 For Cello And Orchestra" (JoAnn Falletta conducting the Buffalo Philharmonic Orchestra); Fernando Otero – "Conexión" (Fernando Otero); Yalil Guerra – "El Retrato de La Paloma" (Iván Valiente conducting the Ensamble Solistas de La Habana); Roberto Sierra – "Trio No. 4 "La Noche" (Arcos Trío)	
2016	Claudia Montero	"Cuarteto Para Buenos Aires"	Claudia Montero	Roberto Sierra – "Beyond The Silence Of Sorrow" (Maximiano Valdés conducting the Puerto Rico Symphony Orchestra); Fernando Otero – "Jardín del Adiós" (Nick Danielson, violinist; Fernando Otero, pianist); Gustavo Casenave – "Mi Familia" (Gustavo Casenave featuring Nick Danielson and Pedro Giraudo); Leo Brouwer – "Sonata de Los Viajeros" (Brasil Guitar Duo)	
2017	Leo Brouwer	"Sonata del Decamerón Negro"	Mabel Millán	Manuel Tejada – "Ave María" (Nathalie Peña Comas); Hebert Vásquez – "Azucena" (Susan Narucki); Diego Schissi – "Nene" (Sibelius Piano Trio); Aurelio de la Vega – "Recordatio" (Anne Marie Ketchum); André Mehmari and Flavio Chamis – "Sonata For Viola and Piano" (André Mehmari and Tatjana Chamis)	
2018	Claudia Montero	"Luces y Sombras. Concierto Para Guitarra y Orquesta De Cuerdas"	Claudia Montero	Roberto Sierra – "Montuno En Forma De Chacona" (Silvia Márquez); Eddie Mora – "Ofrenda" (Eddie Mora directing The Orquesta Sinfónica De Heredia); Jorge Mejia – "Prelude In F Major For Piano & Orchestra" (Jorge Mejia and The Henry Mancini Institute Orchestra); Yalil Guerra – "String Quartet Nº.3 (In Memoriam Ludvvig Van Beethoven)" (La Catrina String Quartet)	
2019	Not awarded				
2020	Carlos Fernando López & José Valentino	"Sacre"	Carlos Fernando López	Joan Magrané – "Dues Peces Per a Piano" (Noelia Rodiles); José Serebrier – "Jose Serebrier: Variaciones Sinfónicas sobre Bach para Piano y Orquesta" (José Serebrier, Alexandre Kantorow & RTÉ National Symphony Orchestra); Ricardo Lorenz – "Pataruco" (Ricardo Lorenz, Kevin L. Sedatole Conducting Michigan State University Wind Symphony); Eddie Mora – "Sine Nomine" (Eddie Mora)	
2021	Roberto Sierra	"Music from Cuba and Spain, Sierra: Sonata para Guitarra"	Manuel Barrueco	Héctor Infanzón – "Concierto para Violín y Orquesta-Remembranzas" (Héctor Infanzón & William Harvey); Orlando Jacinto García – "Cuatro" (Orlando Jacinto Garcia featuring Amernet String Quartet); Eddie Mora – "Desde la Tierra que Habito" (Ensamble Contemporáneo Universitario (ECU) & Banda de Conciertos de Cartago (BCC)); Osvaldo Golijov – "Falling Out of Time" (Osvaldo Golijov)	
2022	Sérgio Assad	"Anido's Portrait: I. Chacarera"	Berta Rojas	Juan Arboleda – "Adagio for Strings, A Mother´s Love" (Juan Arboleda); Jimmy López Bellido – "Aurora" (Houston Symphony Orchestra featuring Andrés Orozco-Estrada (conductor) & Leticia Moreno (soloist)); Dimitri Cervo – "Canauê, for Orchestra" (Dimitri Cervo); Eddie Mora – "Cuatro Haikus" (Orquesta Sinfónica de Heredia featuring José Arturo Chacón)	
2023	Paquito D'Rivera	"Concerto Venezolano"	Pacho Flores featuring Paquito D'Rivera	Gonzalo Grau – "Aroma a Distancia (Live from Paliesius, Lithuania)" (Brooklyn Rider); JP Jofre – "Double Concerto for Clarinet and Bandoneon, III. Aboriginal" (JP Jofre and Seunghee Lee); Juan Pablo Contreras – "Lucha Libre!" (Juan Pablo Contreras); Claudia Montero – "Suite de los Buenos Aires para Piano y Flauta" (Natalia González Figueroa and Tanja Esther Von Arx)	
2024	Arturo Márquez	"Fandango"	Los Angeles Philharmonic, Gustavo Dudamel & Anne Akiko Meyers	Paquito D'Rivera – "Caribben Berceuse" (Barcelona Clarinet Players, Paquito D'Rivera, North Texas Wind Symphony; Eugene Migliaro Corporon, conductor); Rodner Padilla – "Concerto for Electric Bass and Orchestra – Live at Adrienne Arsht Center Miami" (Rodner Padilla, Miami Symphony Orchestra; Eduardo Marturet, conductor); Juan Pablo Contreras – "La Minerva – III. Himno a la Mujer" (Juan Pablo Contreras, Orquesta Latino Mexicana, Angélica Olivo); Julien Labro – "Meditation No. 1" (Takács Quartet & Julien Labro); Daniel Freiberg – "Sueño Austral" (Barcelona Clarinet Players, Freiburger Blasorchester, Miguel Etchegoncelay & Daniel Freiberg)	
2025	Gabriela Ortiz	"Revolución Diamantina - Act I: The Sounds Cats Make, Act II: We Don't Love Each Other, Act III: Borders and Bodies, Act IV: Speaking the Unspeakable"	Gustavo Dudamel, Los Angeles Philharmonic & Los Angeles Master Chorale	Giovanni Piacentini – "Guitar Concerto. I: The Spirit Within, II. Le Tombeau de Viola Liuzzo, III. Devil's Rag" (Eduardo García Barrios, Eliot Fisk, Orquesta Escuela Carlos Chávez); Marvin Camacho – "I Movimiento: La Visita, II Movimiento: Ritual Chamánico, III Movimiento: Introspección, IV Movimiento: Federico Alma Gitana" (Marvin Camacho & Orquesta Sinfónica de la Universidad de Costa Rica)	
