= Guerra String Orchestra =

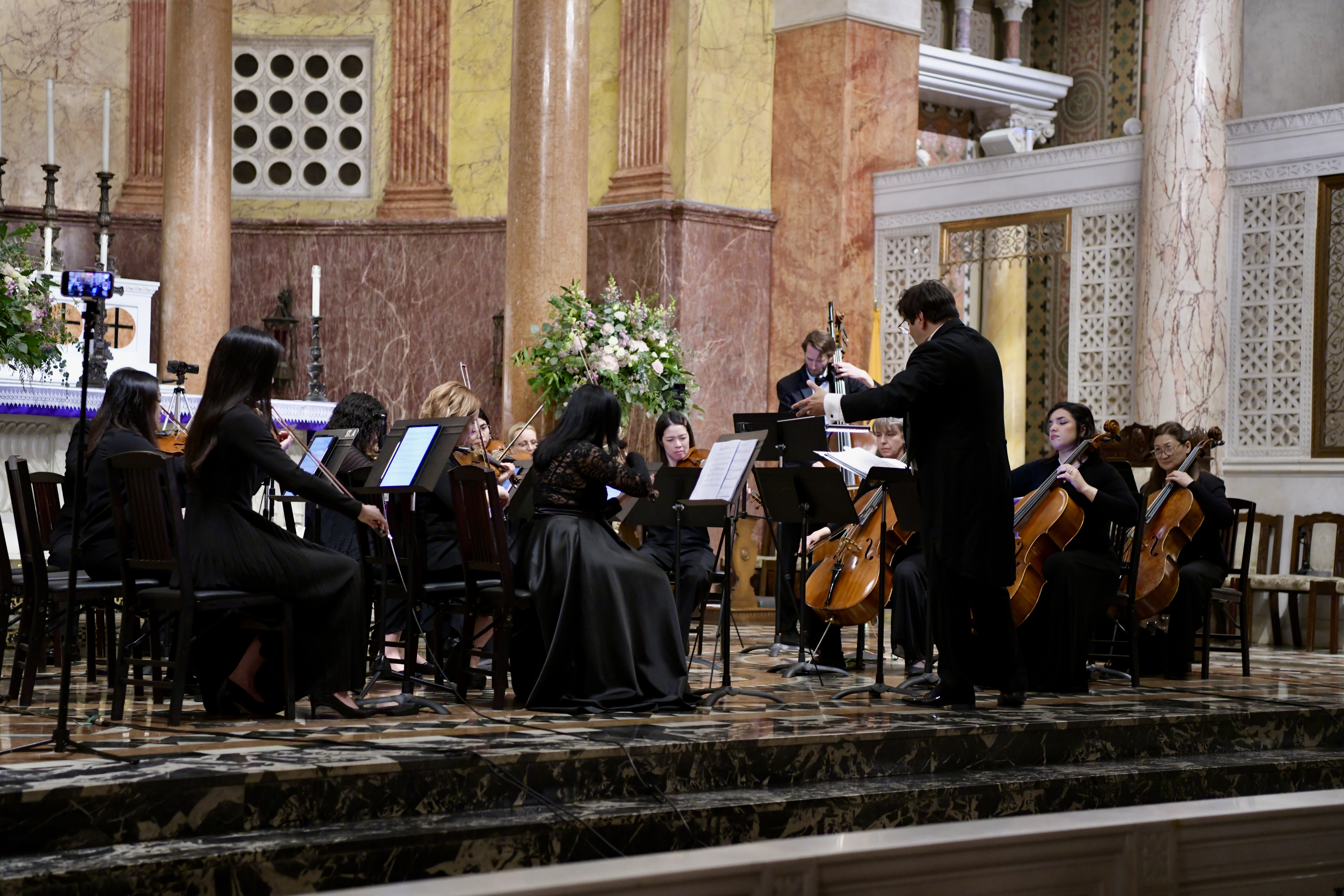
- Guerra String Orchestra with conductor Yalil Guerra

Background information
- Origin: Los Angeles, California
- Genres: Classical, contemporary classical
- Years active: 2023–present

The Guerra String Orchestra (GSO) is a string ensemble founded in 2023 in Los Angeles, California, by composer and conductor Yalil Guerra. Its repertoire highlights contemporary works, underrepresented composers, and programs that blend classical tradition with new musical voices.

== History ==
Guerra created the orchestra in 2023 to bring fresh perspectives to the string repertoire and to promote works by Hispanic/Latino and minority composers.

The inaugural concert, Old Havana, was held on May 6, 2023, at St. Andrew's Catholic Church in Pasadena, California. The program combined classical works with Cuban influences and featured Guerra’s own composition Old Havana.

Later that year, the GSO presented Noche de Otoño in Pasadena, with music by Bernardo Feldman (Del Tingo al Tianguis), Ian Krouse (Symphonies of Strings No. 2, Op. 30 “Dror Yikro”), Samuel Barber’s Adagio, and Edvard Grieg’s Holberg Suite, and Guerra's Terra Ignota.

In March 2025 the program New Beginning introduced new works by Daniel Walker, Reynaldo Fernández Pavón, David Lefkowitz, Dwayne Milbourn and Yalil Guerra.

== Performances ==
Since its founding in 2023, the Guerra String Orchestra has presented a variety of concerts in Pasadena and the greater Los Angeles area, showcasing a mix of classical repertoire, contemporary works, and pieces by underrepresented composers. The ensemble’s debut program, Old Havana, took place on May 6, 2023, at St. Andrew's Catholic Church and featured a blend of classical works and Cuban-influenced compositions, including Guerra’s own composition Old Havana.

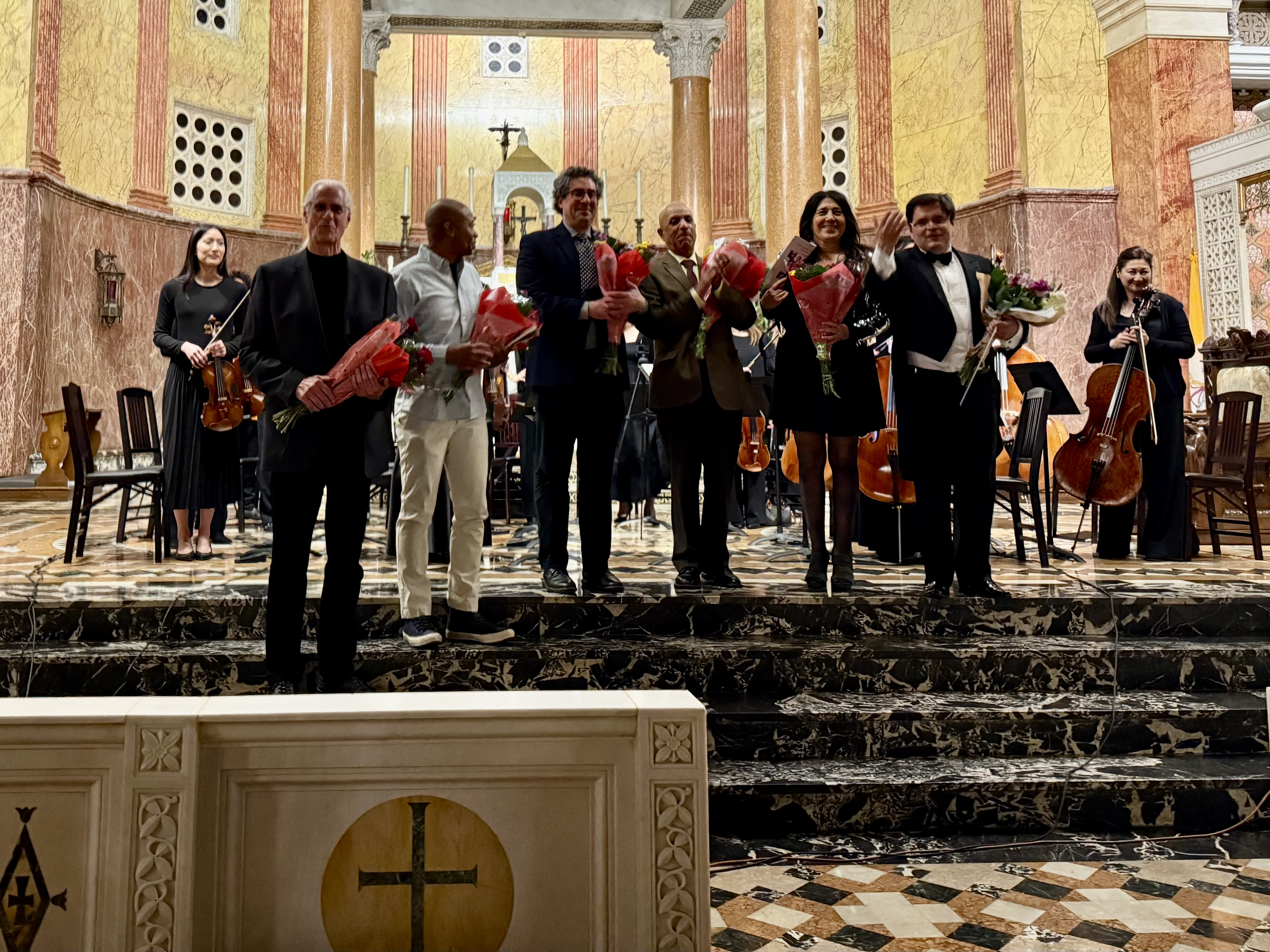
From left to right: composers Daniel Walker, Dwayne Milbourn, David Lefkowitz, Reynaldo Fernández Pavón; flutist Salpy Kerkonian; and composer Yalil Guerra at the New Beginning concert with the Guerra String Orchestra.

Later in 2023, the orchestra presented Noche de Otoño, a concert highlighting contemporary compositions such as Bernardo Feldman’s Del Tingo al Tianguis and Ian Krouse’s Symphonies of Strings No. 2, Op. 30 “Dror Yikro”, alongside canonical works by Samuel Barber and Edvard Grieg. This program exemplified the ensemble’s commitment to pairing traditional string repertoire with modern and international influences.

In March 2025, the GSO premiered New Beginning, a program dedicated to introducing new works by emerging composers, including Daniel Walker, Reynaldo Fernández Pavón, and David Lefkowitz. The concert emphasized the orchestra’s mission to give voice to contemporary composers while providing audiences with a dynamic and diverse listening experience. Throughout these performances, the GSO has been praised for its precise interpretations, engaging stage presence, and dedication to expanding the string repertoire.

== Repertoire ==
The Guerra String Orchestra’s repertoire spans a wide range of styles, from Baroque and Romantic classics to contemporary compositions, with a particular focus on underrepresented composers and new works. The ensemble performs canonical works by composers such as Johann Sebastian Bach, Felix Mendelssohn, Edvard Grieg, and Samuel Barber, alongside compositions by Cuban-American composer Aurelio de la Vega and works by its founder, Yalil Guerra.

The orchestra has premiered numerous compositions, showcasing both emerging and established composers. World premieres include Bernardo Feldman’s rhythmically vibrant Del Tingo al Tianguis and Daniel Walker’s innovative Into the Impossible. U.S. premieres include Ian Krouse’s expressive Dror Yikro, Reynaldo Pavón’s lyrical Adagio, and Guerra’s own compositions Terra Ignota, Al Partir, and El Retrato de la Paloma. Through these performances, the orchestra emphasizes expanding the string ensemble repertoire, blending traditional techniques with modern approaches to melody, harmony, and texture, while highlighting underrepresented voices in classical music.

== Mission ==
The Guerra String Orchestra is dedicated to promoting diversity, inclusion, and innovation in the classical music world. Its mission is to highlight music by minority and underrepresented composers, while also giving premieres of new works by contemporary voices. The ensemble seeks to create a platform where both established and emerging composers can reach wider audiences, ensuring that a variety of cultural and stylistic perspectives are represented in the string repertoire.

Programming is carefully curated to combine traditional works with modern and Latin American influences, fostering dialogue between historical traditions and contemporary creativity. Through concerts, premieres, and recordings, the GSO aims to challenge conventional programming, inspire new interpretations of classic repertoire, and expand audience appreciation for innovative string music. Additionally, the orchestra emphasizes educational outreach and collaboration, working with guest artists, composers, and institutions to cultivate a dynamic and inclusive musical community.

== Key people ==
The Guerra String Orchestra was founded and is led by composer and conductor Yalil Guerra, who also serves as the artistic director. Guerra’s vision guides the ensemble’s programming, emphasizing a balance between classical string repertoire and contemporary compositions by underrepresented and emerging composers.

In addition to Guerra, the orchestra frequently collaborates with distinguished guest artists to enhance its performances. Notable collaborators have included flutist Salpy Kerkonian, known for her expressive tone and versatility across classical and contemporary repertoire, and oboist Francisco Castillo, whose performances bring depth and color to the orchestra’s interpretations.

The ensemble also works closely with composers, soloists, and other musicians on premieres and special projects, fostering creative partnerships that contribute to the orchestra’s mission of promoting new music and diverse voices in the string repertoire. Through these collaborations, the GSO provides both artists and audiences with opportunities to engage with innovative and culturally significant works.

== Reception ==
The Guerra String Orchestra has received critical acclaim for its artistic excellence and its commitment to expanding the string ensemble repertoire. Critics have highlighted the orchestra’s role in championing music by minority and underrepresented composers, as well as its innovative programming that blends classical traditions with contemporary and Latin American influences.

Media outlets have emphasized both the ensemble’s origins and its growing impact on the Los Angeles cultural scene. Coverage has noted the orchestra’s founding by Yalil Guerra as a significant addition to the region’s classical music landscape, praising its efforts to introduce new and diverse works to audiences. The debut album, Genesis, has been recognized for its ambitious repertoire, combining canonical works by composers such as Johann Sebastian Bach, Edvard Grieg, and Samuel Barber with contemporary pieces and U.S. premieres, earning positive responses from critics and classical music enthusiasts alike.

In addition to recordings, the orchestra’s live performances have been praised for technical precision, expressive interpretations, and engaging stage presence. Reviewers have noted that the GSO’s dedication to premieres and underrepresented composers not only enriches concert programs but also provides a platform for innovative musical voices, contributing to a broader and more inclusive understanding of contemporary string music.

== Discography ==
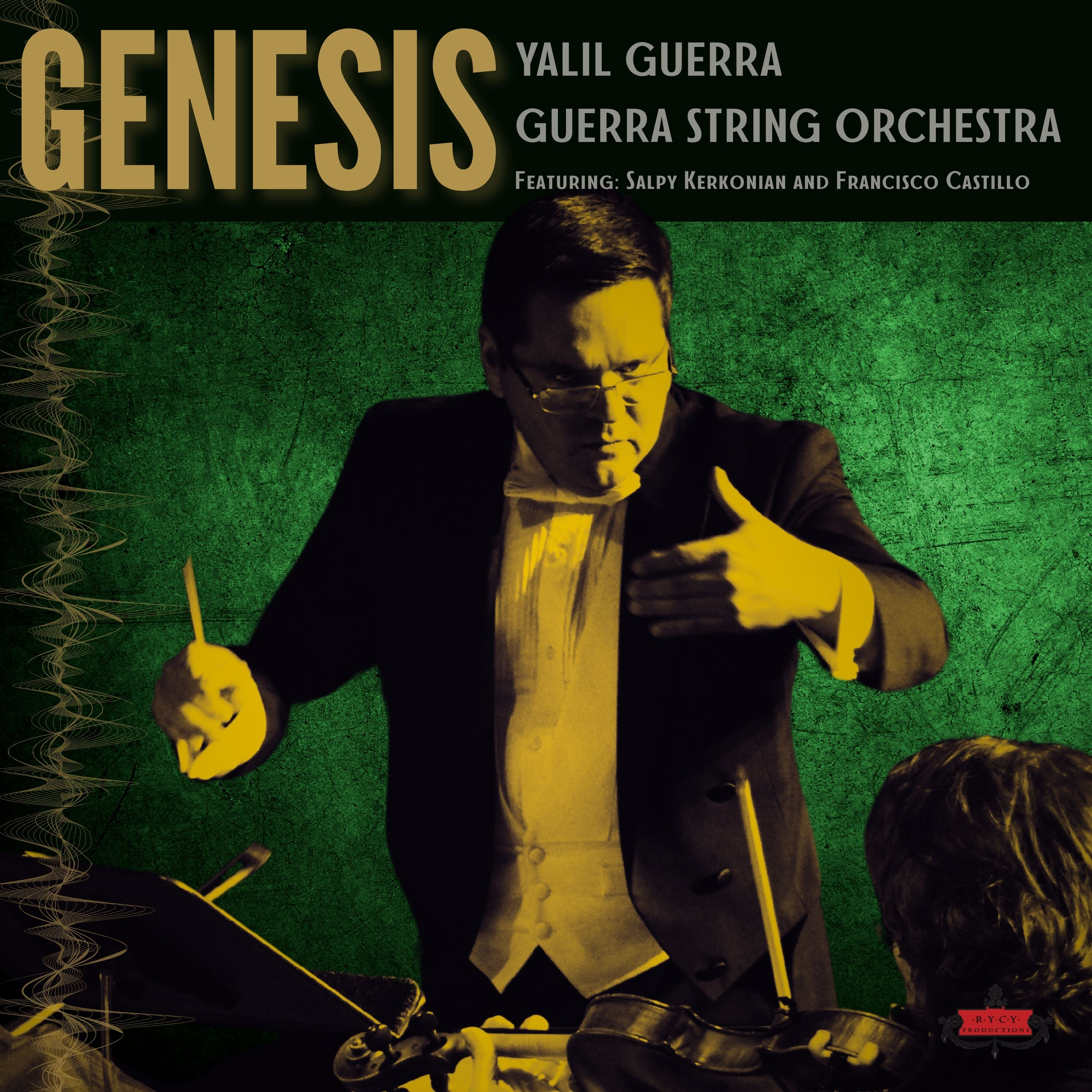
Genesis (2025) by the Guerra String Orchestra, conducted by Yalil Guerra

Genesis (2025, Guerra String Orchestra, cond. Yalil Guerra) features live performances of works by Bach, Mendelssohn, Grieg, Barber, de la Vega, and Guerra. Available on major platforms: Amazon Music, Apple Music, Spotify.

== Video ==
- GSO official playlist – YouTube playlist of live performances.

== See also ==
- Yalil Guerra
- Contemporary classical music
