= Ken Namba =

Japanese composer

- Born: September 19, 1983; Hamamatsu, Shizuoka Prefecture, Japan
- Other name: 難波 研
- Occupations: violinist, composer
- Website: Ken Namba Official Website

Ken Namba (難波 研, Nanba Ken; born September 19, 1983) is a Japanese composer, performer and researcher.

== Biography ==
Namba was born in Hamamatsu. He studied at Toho College of Music. He studied with Kazuaki Ogikubo, Jun Nagao, Tomiko Kohjiba, Carlo Forlivesi and René Staar. His works have been performed by many players not only in Japan, but also in Vienna and Kosovo. He received various prizes at national and international competitions including Japan national composition competition iic Tokyo 2008 (first prize, organized by the Istituto Italiano di Cultura Tokyo in 2008), Tōru Takemitsu Composition Award (2nd prize, organized by the Tokyo Opera City Cultural Foundation in 2010) and his selected to the finalist of UNIQUE FORMS OF CONTINUITY IN SPACE INTERNATIONALCOMPOSITION COMPETITION 2010 (organized by the Italian Institute of Culture, Melbourne in 2010).

He is a lecturer at the Toho College of Music.
