= Toru Takemitsu Composition Award =

Music competition

The Toru Takemitsu Composition Award (武満徹作曲賞, Takemitsu Tōru sakkyoku-shō) is an international music competition for young composers of contemporary classical music organized in Tokyo, Japan. The award was founded by composer Toru Takemitsu, its namesake.

== History ==
The Toru Takemitsu Composition Award was established in 1997.

Each year, only one judge picks the winner of the award. For the first 3-year cycle, Takemitsu himself chose the judges: Henri Dutilleux (1997), György Ligeti (1998), and Luciano Berio (1999). Then, after Takemitsu's death, the three successors, Louis Andriessen (2000 recommended by Berio), Oliver Knussen (2001 recommended by Dutilleux) and Joji Yuasa (2002 recommended by Ligeti) were nominated by the initial judges.

For the third 3-year cycle (2003–2005), George Benjamin (2003), Magnus Lindberg (2004) and John Adams (2005 • cancelled) were nominated on the recommendation of the competition's advisors (Hiroyuki Iwaki, Oliver Knussen, Kent Nagano, Kazushi Ohno, Simon Rattle, Esa-Pekka Salonen and Hiroshi Wakasugi) and preceding judges.

For the fourth 3-year cycle (2007–2009), the advisors and previous judges selected Akira Nishimura (2007), Steve Reich (2008) and Helmut Lachenmann (2009).

Tristan Murail (2010), Salvatore Sciarrino (2011) and Toshio Hosokawa (2012) were appointed as judges for the new 2010–2012 cycle.

The nominated pieces are performed at the Tokyo Opera City Concert Hall.

As of 2011, fifty different composers had been nominated for this prize since its inception in 1997.

The total sum of the cash award is 3,000,000 Yen each year.

In 2026, the cash awards were:

- 1st Prize: 1,000,000 yen
- 2nd Prize: 800,000 yen
- 3rd Prize: 700,000 yen
- 4th Prize: 500,000 yen

== Results ==
The winners are:

Year	Judge	1st prize	2nd prize	3rd prize	4th prize	Notes
1997	Henri Dutilleux	not awarded	"ZÉULA" by Massimo Botter; "Mabuni-no-Oka" by Hideki Kozakura	PAGAN II by Marc Kenneth Yeats		
1998	György Ligeti	not awarded	not awarded	not awarded		
1999	Luciano Berio	"Uninterrupted Song" by Katsuji Maeda	"DINAMORPHIA" by Ken Itō	"Polychrome" by Toshiya Watanabe		
2000	Louis Andriessen	"L'été – L'oubli rouge" by Jun Nagao	"AWAKENINGS" by Joe Cutler	"Pulsating" by Sho Ueda		
2001	Oliver Knussen	"AQUILO" by Arlene Elizabeth Sierra; "Gebilde-Gegenbild" by René Mense	"5 pieces for orchestra" by Luke Bedford	"Stein/Stern" by Ryuji Kubota		
2002	Joji Yuasa	"Canticum Tremulum" by Royuki Yamamoto; "Tenunan II" by Tazul Tajuddin	"FEEDBACK" by Panayiotis Kokoras; "Scene for Orchestra" by Theodor Pauss	"Tzolkin" by Michael John Wiley		
2003	George Benjamin	"Allégories" by Joël Mérah	"Calling Timbuktu" by Dai Fujikura	"Nights Bright Days" by Phillip Neil Martin; "Da/Fort" by Vittorio Zago		
2004	Magnus Lindberg	"Fantasia on a Theme by Vaughan Williams" by Paul Stanhope	"Phenomenon" by Narong Prangcharoen; "Focal Distance II" by Sho Ueda	"YU-HYUN" by Soonjung Suh; "TALKING" by Marius Baranauskas		
2005	John Adams	The competition was cancelled				
2006		There was no competition				
2007	Akira Nishimura	"Never Stand Behind Me" by Sho Ueda	"CUBE" by Andrea Portera	"AQUA" by Man Fang; "Reminiscence of a dream" by YiMing Wu; "In Killing Fields Sweet Butterfly Ascend" by Jonas Valfridsson		
2008	Steve Reich	"What dou you think about the dropping of atomic bombs on Hiroshima and Nagasaki?" by Yuichi Matsumoto	"La Noche de Takemitsu" by Tomás Barreiro	"God in the Machine" by Damian Barbeler; "16_1/32_1" by Toru Nakatani		
2009	Helmut Lachenmann	"Hexagonal Pulsar" by Kenji Sakai	"Creatura Temporale" by Raffaele Grimaldi; "ZAI" by Kazutomo Yamamoto	"Cronica Fisiologica Universal" by Lucas Fagin; "A Whirl of Endless Repetition – To the Chaotic Ocean" by Masato Kimura		
2010	Tristan Murail	"...Figures at the Base of a Crucifixion" by Roberto Toscano (Brazil)	"Aquarius" by Andrej Slezak (Slovakia/Hungary); "Infinito Nero e Lontano la Luce" by Ken Namba (Japan)	"Deux Presages" by Chikako Yamanaka (Japan)		
2011	Salvatore Sciarrino	"Flux et reflux" by Florent Motsch-Etienne (France)	"Subliminal" by Bernd Richard Deutsch (Austria)	"Parts II" by Jan Erik Mikalsen (Norway)	"NAMOK" by Heera Kim (Korea)	
2012	Toshio Hosokawa	"Mano d'erba, per orchestra" by Federico Gardella (Italy)	"Une Œuvre pour l'Echo des Rêves (II), pour orchestra" by Ioannis Angelakis (Greece)	"I Do Hope to Sleep in the Silent Universe" by Masato Kimura (Japan); "WARAI" by Shiori Usui (Japan)		
2013	Harrison Birtwistle	"SIGHS – hommage à Fryderyk Chopin" by Marcin Stańczyk (Poland)	"The Lark in the Snow" by Sumio Kobayashi (Japan)	"Zwei Landschaftsbilder" by Huan Liu (China); "'CLOSE' to You to 'OPEN'" by Nana Kamiyama (Japan)		
2014	Peter Eötvös	"THE NORTHERN CAMELLIA – GRADATION OF SOUNDING AMITY No. 2" by Kei Daigo (Japan)	"Until the Sea Above Us Is Closed Again" Giovanni Dario Manzini (Italy)	"BLACK BOXES für drei Orchestergruppen" by Timo Ruttkamp (Germany); "AWAKENING / SERENITY" by Siraseth Pantura-umporn (Thailand)		
2015	Kaija Saariaho	"Reachings for orchestra" by Sebastian Hilli (Finland); "[difeʁãs] for orchestra" by Yiğit Kolat (Turkey/US)	"cuadro de presencia for orchestra" by Fabià Santcovsky (Spain); "loop-fantasy for orchestra" by Thomas Wally (Austria)	not awarded		
2016	Toshi Ichiyanagi	"ARCHETYPE" by Michael Seltenreich (Israel); "Let's speak in Wondrous Words! for orchestra" by Hirofumi Mogi (Japan)	"triple sensibilities for orchestra" by Myunghoon Park (Korea); "Nacres for Orchestra" by Alice Nakamura (Japan)	not awarded		
2017	Heinz Holliger	"Paysages entrelacés pour orchestre" by Naoki Sakata (Japan)	"at the still point for orchestra" by Zihua Tan (Malaysia); "NOWHERE for orchestra" by Annachiara Gedda (Italy); "Ich habe nie Menschenfleisch gegessen for orchestra" by Stefan Beyer (Germany)	not awarded		
2018	Unsuk Chin	"Quanta" by Barnaby Martin (UK); "STARING WEI JIE TO DEATH" by Paulo Brito (Brazil/US)	"Quantum Vacuum" by Lukas Hövelmann-Köper (Germany); "SLEEPING IN THE WIND" by Bo Li (China)	not awarded		
2019	Philippe Manoury	"Resonanz vom Horizont" by Shiqi Geng (China); "Entelequias" by Pablo Rubino Lindner (Argentina)	"Im Bauch des Fisches drei Tage und drei Nächte " by Siqi Liu (China)	"At The End Of Snow Line" by Zhuosheng Jin (China)		
2020	Thomas Adès	"BORÉAS" by Xinyang Wang (China)	"SIX PRAYERS" by David Roche (UK)	"POÈMES DE MIDI" by Francisco Domínguez (Spain)	"Saṃsāra" by Carmen Ho (UK)	
2021	Pascal Dusapin	"Moonlight Hidden in the Clouds" by Kohsuke Negishi (Japan)	"BREAKING A MIRROR" by Giorgio Francesco Dalla Villa (Italy)	"TEHOM" by Jakob Gruchmann (Austria); "The echo of shadows, hallucination..." by Minchang Kang (Korea)		
2022	Brian Ferneyhough	Takuto Muromoto (Japan) KEBESU – Circle of Flame for orchestra	Andrea Mattevi (Italy) Comune il principio e la fine del cerchio for symphonic orchestra	Omar Hernández Lazo (Mexico) Inflamado de una álgida lejanía; Mehmet Ӧzkan (Turkey/Bulgaria) Intermezzo for Orchestra "Anarchical Lament"		
2023	Jo Kondo	Michael Taplin (UK) Selvedge for full orchestra	Guillermo Cobo Garcia (Spain) Yabal-al-Tay for symphonic orchestra; Koji Yamabe (Japan) Underscore for orchestra	Yuheng Chen (China) tracé / trait für Orchester		
2024	Mark-Anthony Turnage	Jingyu Chen (Hong Kong SAR) Nebula for symphony orchestra	Jose Luis Valdivia Arias (Spain) Al-Zahra – Three pieces for orchestra; Giovanni Liguori (Italy) Hypnos – Reminiscenze oniriche per grande orchestra	Alessandro Adamo (Italy) Parenthesis		
2025	Georg Friedrich Haas	Suguru Wagatsuma (Japan) MATSURU for orchestra; Nozomu Kaneda (Japan) The Play for Skin and Fabric for 2 orchestras	not awarded	Jiaying Zhou (China) Tidal Lock for orchestra; Francesco Mariotti (Italy) Diptych for orchestra		
2026	Jörg Widmann	Jaehyeok Choi (Korea) Supernova for orchestra	Ziyi Tao (US) If for orchestra	Kenshi Matsuo (Japan) Variations for Orchestra	Zhehe Cui (China) The Last Gamble for orchestra	
