= Symphony No. 1, "La Palma Real" =

2018 work by Yalil Guerra

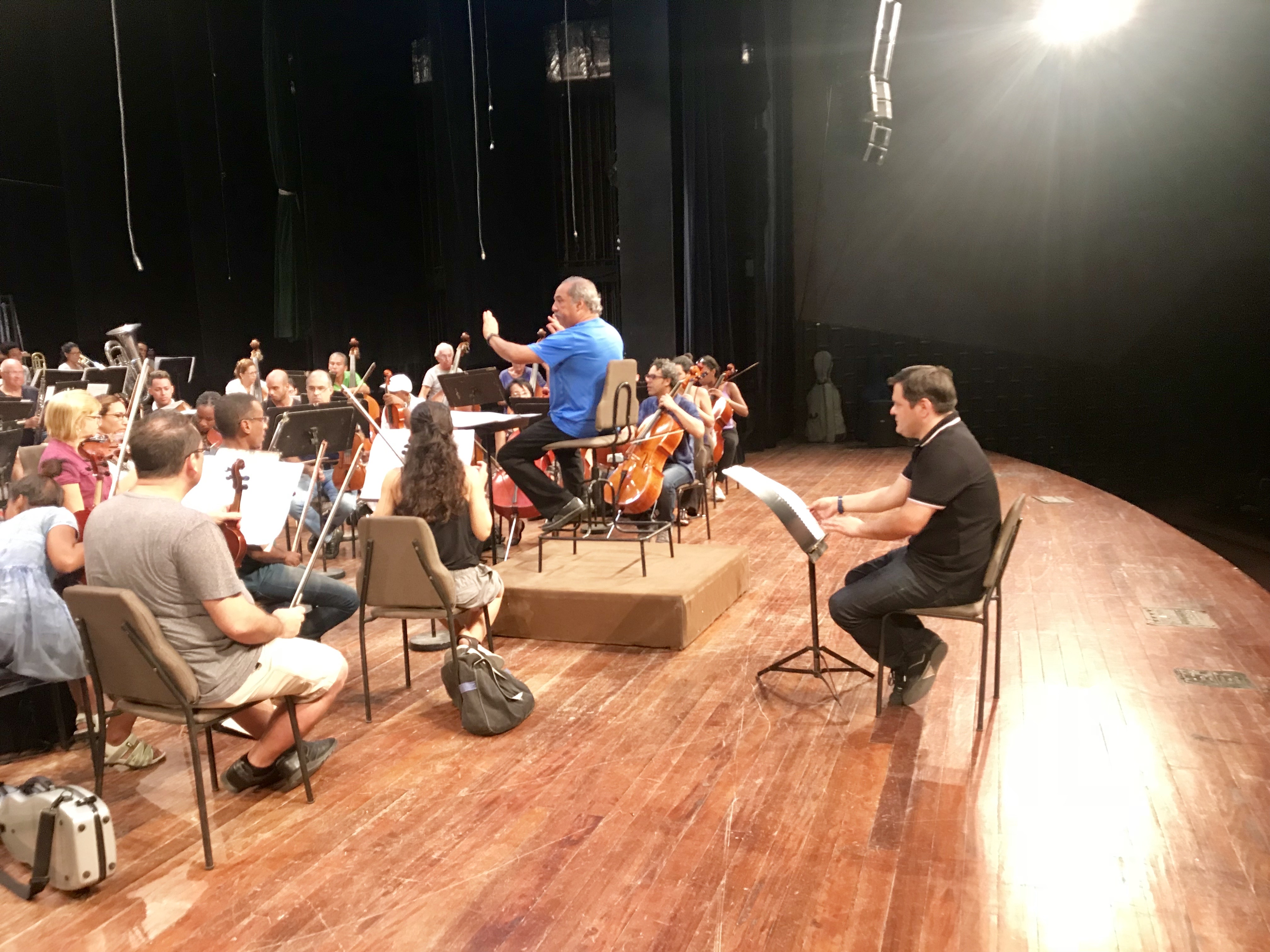
Composer Yalil Guerra at a rehearsal of his Symphony No. 1 with the Cuban National Symphony, conducted by Enrique Pérez Mesa in Havana, Cuba.

Yalil Guerra's Symphony No. 1, titled La Palma Real, is a symphonic work dedicated to José Martí, the Cuban national hero. The composition reflects Guerra's Cuban identity and cultural heritage.

== Cuban premiere ==
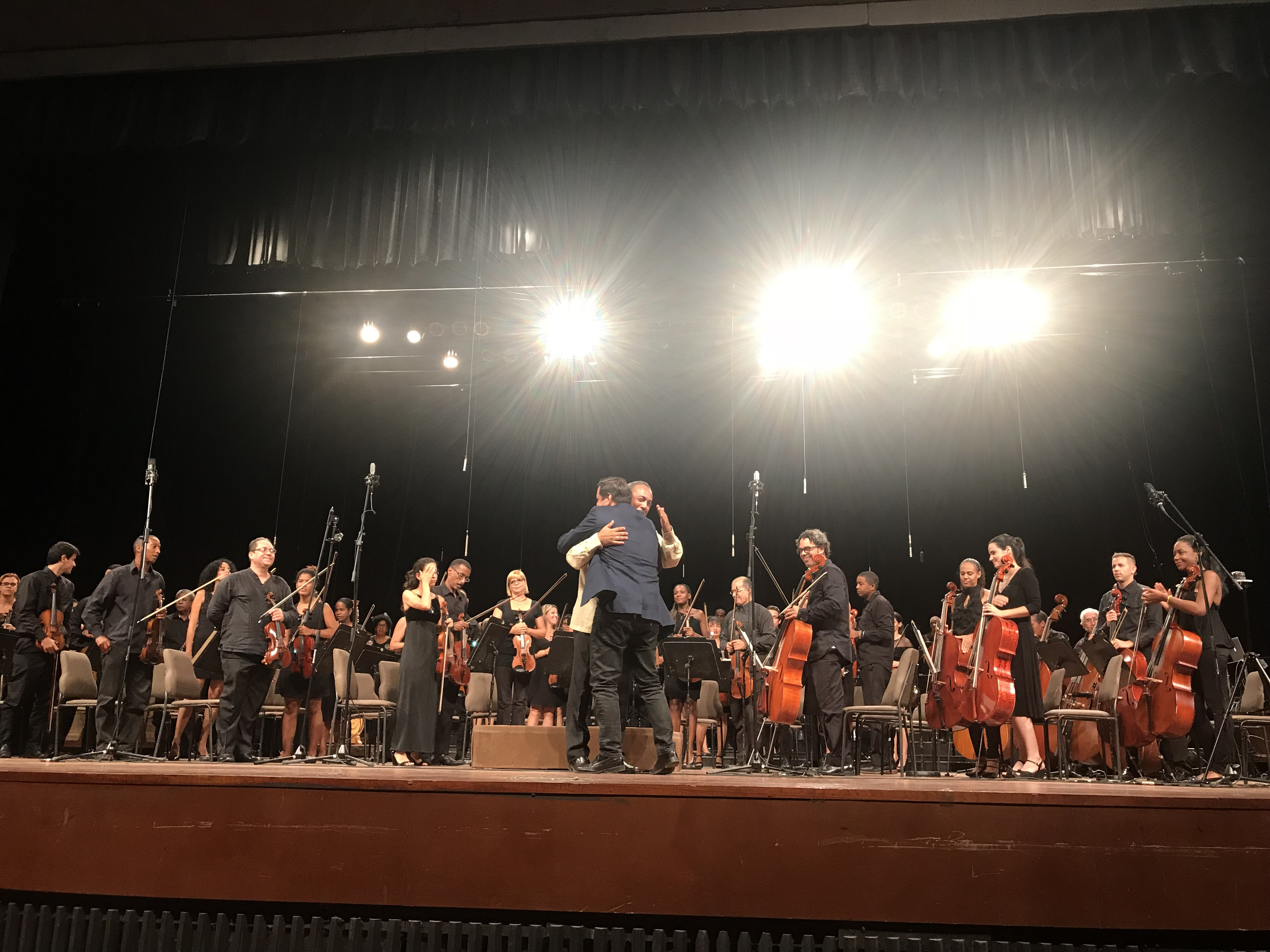
Composer Yalil Guerra at the world premiere of his Symphony No. 1 in Havana, Cuba.

The world premiere took place on August 5, 2018, at the Covarrubias Hall of the National Theater of Cuba. The performance was conducted by Maestro Enrique Pérez Mesa with the National Symphony Orchestra of Cuba. The symphony is structured in four movements: "El Exilio," "La Batalla de Dos Ríos," "Elegía," and "El Legado," culminating in a double fugue—a complex musical form chosen by Guerra to honor Martí's legacy. Guerra explained that the title La Palma Real symbolizes both the royal palm tree, a national emblem of Cuba, and Martí himself, whom he considers a "royal palm" of the Cuban nation.

== European premiere ==
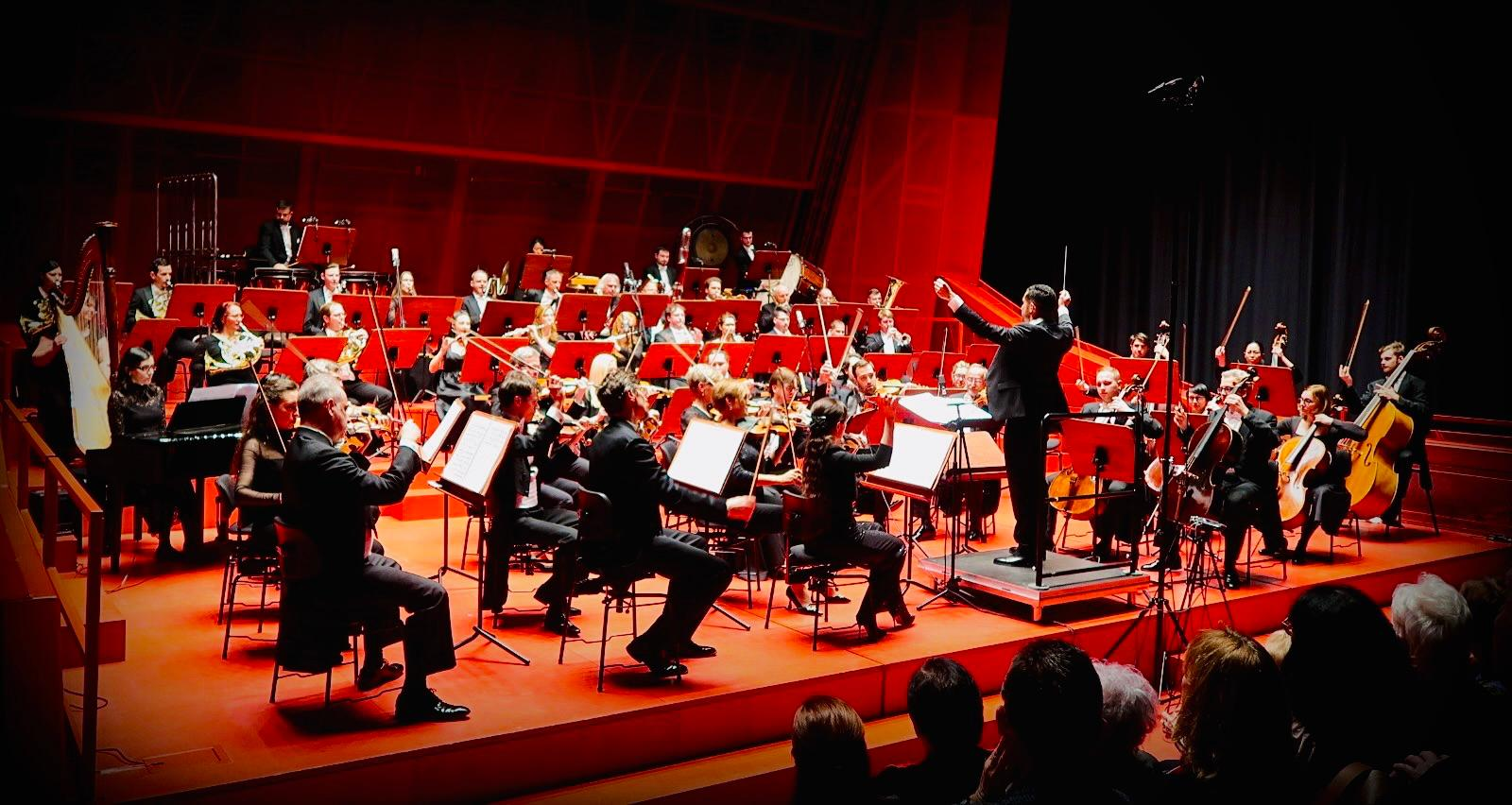
Conductor Simón Zerpa Carbaollo leading the European premiere of Yalil Guerra's Symphony No. 1.

The European premiere took place on March 6, 2025, in the Czech Republic, performed by the Karlovy Vary Symphony Orchestra under Venezuelan conductor Simón Zerpa Carballo. The event was covered by media outlets such as Diario Las Américas and Siempre con Cuba, highlighting the cultural significance of the work and its connection to José Martí.

== Recording and awards ==
The symphony was recorded with the National Symphony Orchestra of Cuba, conducted by Enrique Pérez Mesa, and released on the album Cuba: The Legacy by Rycy Productions in 2019. The album was nominated for a Latin Grammy Award for Best Classical Album and won the Cubadisco Award in the Classical Album category in 2022.

== Cultural significance ==
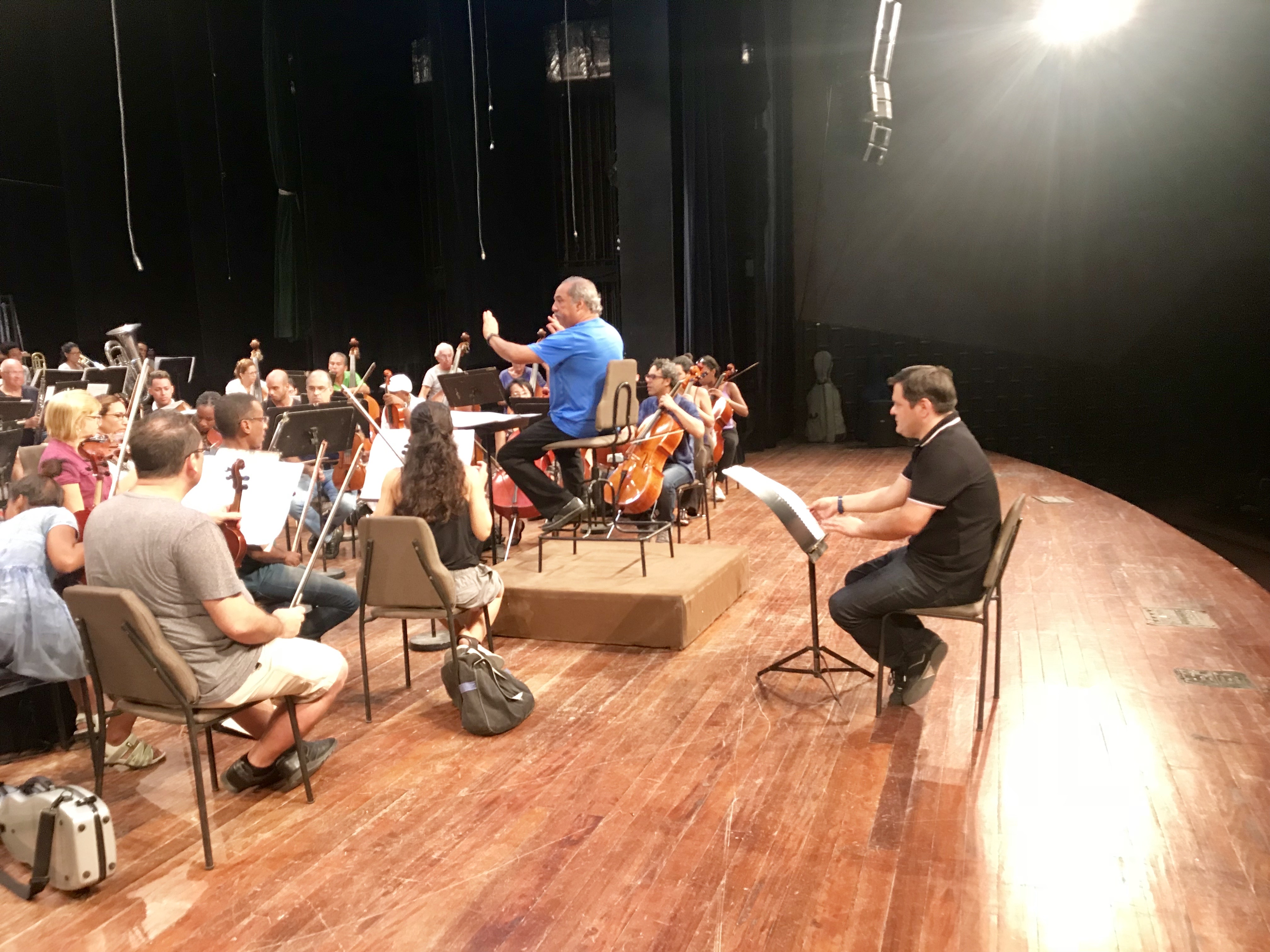
Composer Yalil Guerra at a rehearsal of his Symphony No. 1 with the Cuban National Symphony, conducted by Enrique Pérez Mesa in Havana, Cuba.

In an interview with Juventud Rebelde, Guerra emphasized the importance of connecting his work to his roots and culture, stating, "Yalil Guerra is Cuban, the man of the palm, the mambi, someone who always has his country present in his soul and thoughts." The symphony is recognized as a significant contribution to contemporary Cuban classical music.

== See also ==
- José Martí
- National Symphony Orchestra of Cuba
- Aurelio de la Vega
- UCLA Herb Alpert School of Music
- Latin Grammy Awards
- Cubadisco Awards
- Karlovy Vary Symphony Orchestra
- Simón Zerpa Carballo
