= Matthew Ricketts (composer) =

- Born: Matthew Jonathan Ricketts; January 15, 1986 (age 40); Victoria, British Columbia, Canada
- Genres: Contemporary classical
- Occupation: Composer
- Instrument: piano
- Years active: 2007–present
- Website: www.matthewricketts.com

Matthew Ricketts (born 1986) is a Canadian composer of contemporary classical music. He is a 2019 Guggenheim Fellow as well as the recipient of the 2020 Charles Ives Fellowship from the American Academy of Arts and Letters, the 2016 Jacob Druckman Prize from the Aspen Music Festival, the 2015 Salvatore Martirano Memorial Composition Award, a 2013 ASCAP Foundation Morton Gould Young Composer Award, and eight prizes in the SOCAN Foundation's Awards for Young Composers. He lives in Brooklyn, New York.

== Biography ==
Matthew Ricketts was born in Victoria, British Columbia. He attended McGill University’s Schulich School of Music, where he studied composition with Chris Harman, Brian Cherney, and John Rea. He earned a doctorate in music composition from Columbia University, where he studied with George Lewis and Fred Lerdahl.

Ricketts's music has been performed by the Aspen Philharmonic Orchestra, Esprit Orchestra, the Minnesota Orchestra and the Montreal Symphony Orchestra, as well as by ensembles and soloists including JACK Quartet, Quatuor Bozzini, the Chiara String Quartet, FLUX Quartet, soprano Tony Arnold, and the Nouvel Ensemble Moderne (NEM). He was Composer-Collaborator-In-Residence at East Carolina University from 2016 to 2018.

In May 2017, the opening of Ricketts’s Highest Light, a Montreal Symphony Orchestra commission, was performed by French astronaut Thomas Pesquet aboard the International Space Station, in a live broadcast during the world premiere performance in Montreal.

Ricketts's chamber opera Chaakapesh: The Trickster's Quest, with a libretto in Cree by Indigenous Canadian playwright Tomson Highway, premiered in September 2018 as the opening of the Montreal Symphony Orchestra's 85th season, and was followed by a tour of indigenous communities in Northern Quebec. The tour was documented in the 2019 film Chaakapesh.

== Other works ==
Ricketts is also active as a writer, librettist, and poet. His operatic collaboration with composer Thierry Tidrow, Less Truth More Telling, was produced in 2013 by the Dutch National Opera and the Royal Conservatory of The Hague.

== Selected works ==
=== Orchestral ===
- Adrift (2020) for clarinet and orchestra
- Halo (2019) for two trombones and orchestra
- Méloscuro (2018) for piano and orchestra
- Blood Line (2017) for orchestra
- Melodia (2017) for piano and orchestra
- Flat Line (2016) version for orchestra

=== Chamber ===
- Ember (2019) for string quartet
- Melodia (2016-2017) for piano solo
- Highest Light (2016) for organ solo
- In Partial View (2015) for string quartet
- Flat Line (2014) for chamber ensemble of 15 players
- Enclosed Position (2014) for alto flute, clarinet, string trio and piano
- After Nine (2014) revised version for chamber ensemble
- Winter Line (2013) for chamber ensemble of 14 players
- Burrowed Time (2012) for chamber ensemble of 15 musicians
- Still Burning (2011) for bassoon, bass trio, percussion and piano
- Trio (2011) for clarinet, viola and piano
- Graffiti Songs (2010) for flute, violin, cello and piano
- Double Concerto (2007) for flute, clarinet and chamber ensemble

=== Vocal ===
- Chaakapesh: The Trickster's Quest (2018) opera in three scenes for orchestra, two singers and narrator
- Unset (2017) for soprano and chamber ensemble
- Fälscherlieder (2016) for six voices and four instruments
- Song Cycle (2015) for soprano and chamber ensemble
- Swallow Songs (2014) for high soprano and piano
- Women Well Met (2013) for vocal sextet
- No Masque for Good Measure (2012) opera in three acts for four voices and four instruments

== Selected awards and grants ==
- 2020 Civitella Ranieri Fellowship
- 2020 Charles Ives Fellowship in Music from the American Academy of Arts and Letters
- 2019 Guggenheim Fellowship
- 2019 MacDowell Colony Fellowship
- 2016 Jacob Druckman Prize (Aspen Music Festival and School)
- 2015 Salvatore Martirano Memorial Composition Award for Flat Line (first prize)
- 2013 ASCAP Foundation Morton Gould Young Composer Awards for Burrowed Time
