= Salvatore Martirano Memorial Composition Award =

American music award

The Salvatore Martirano Memorial Composition Award is an international composers' competition held annually in memory of Salvatore Martirano (1927–1995), who was an internationally acclaimed American composer and served as professor of composition at the University of Illinois from 1963 to 1995. The first place prize consists of US$1,000 and a performance by the Illinois Modern Ensemble at the Krannert Center for the Performing Arts.

== Awards ==
Year	First prize	Second prize	Other honors
1997	Jason Eckardt: Echoes' White Veil		
1998	Karim Al-Zand: String Quartet		
1999	Keith Moore: A Vagrant on Every Floor; Craig Walsh: 0 to 33 in 1045.5		
2000	Sophia Serghi: Sizzle		
2001	Orlando Jacinto Garcia: Paisaje del Sonido II		
2002	Yumiko Juvigny: Out of Dark Lair		
2003	Edward Top: String Quartet		
2004	Robert Yamasato: Scherzo		
2005	Steven Rice: Murmurs from Limbo		
2006	Douglas Boyce: 102nd & Amsterdam	Jorge García del Valle Méndez: Seok Yang Jong	Calogero Panvino: Sonata 101 (Honorable mention); Nicholas Paul Vines: Dolmen for a New Albion (Honorable mention)
2007	Takeo Hoshiya: Instability Principle	So Jeong Ahn: Ssa-reng, ui...	Christopher Arrell: Argot (Honorable mention)
2008	Abel Paúl: fragmentos del vértigo	Sungji Hong: Shades of Raindrops	Carl Bettendorf: Inner Life (Third prize)
2009	Michael Klingbeil: Tear of the Clouds	Vladimir Rannev: Variations on an Impulse	Christopher Bailey: Walking down the Hillside... (Honorable mention); Geoff Knorr: Of Consonance and Contention (Honorable mention)
2011	Louis Aguirre: Ochosi for string quartet	Marcin Stanczyk: Nibiru	Julien-Robert Legault Salvail: Chute libre (Third prize)
2012	Michael Seltenreich: Sparks and Flares	Stephen Yip: Dark Side of the Shadow	
2013	Luís Antunes Pena: Im Rauschen Rot for double bass, percussion quartet, and electronics	Daniel Moreira: The King from Papatua	Alexander Khubeev: Sounds from the Dark Time (Third prize)
2014	Nina C. Young: Traced Upon Cinders for 13 musicians	Aurélio Edler-Copes: Encore Seule	David Coll: Act (Third prize)
2015	Matthew Ricketts: Flat Line for 15 players	Anthony Vine: For Agnes Martin	
2016	James O'Callaghan: Among Am A for flute, bass clarinet, violin, cello, piano, and electronics	Nicola Straffelini: Labyrinth Song for piccolo, bass clarinet, violin, cello, percussion, and piano	
2017	Oren Boneh: Winter Walks That Gravel My Voice for viola and chamber ensemble	Igor Santos: Two Two for chamber ensemble	David Bird: Drop for string octet and strobe lights with electronics
2018	David Clay Mettens: Without Air for flute, viola, cello, harp, and percussion	Charles Peck: Sunburst for piano quartet	
2019	Joshua Hey: I am in here for violin and cello	Katherine Balch: Prelude for piano and cello	Selim Goncu: Widerklang for bass clarinet, percussion, piano, violin, and cello
2020	Zhuosheng Jin: A Piece of Watermelon for soprano and six instrumentalists	Stylianos Dimou: les instances for large ensemble and diffused, synthesized soundso	
2021	Luis Quintana: Smudges over dripping ink for piano and ensemble	Utku Asuroglu: In Between for chamber ensemble and electronics	Paul Novak: as the light begins to drift for sinfonietta (Honorable Mention)
2022	Timothy Roy: dans les dents de la guivre for harp, multichannel electronics, and lighting	Emre Sihan Kaleli: Adjacent rooms, a part of a labyrinth for chamber ensemble	Tomasz Skweres: Event Horizon for chamber ensemble
2023	Anna-Louise Walton: Basket of Figs for soprano, flute, and clarinet	Louis J. Goldford: Mauvaise Foi for soprano, chamber ensemble, and electronics	Lina Tonia: Magna Carta Libertatum for chamber ensemble
2024	Omer Barash: Te’ena	Chris Fisher-Lochhead: stutter-step the concept	Daniel Fawcett: Echoes of Wild Petals
