= Chaakapesh =

- Film poster
- Directed by: Roger Frappier; Justin Kingsley
- Written by: Tomson Highway; Matthew Ricketts
- Produced by: Roger Frappier
- Starring: Kent Nagano; Tomson Highway; Florent Vollant
- Cinematography: Mario Janelle
- Edited by: René Roberge
- Production company: Max Films
- Distributed by: Fragments Distribution
- Release date: October 19, 2019 (FNC)
- Running time: 126 minutes
- Country: Canada
- Languages: English; French; Cree; Inuktitut

Chaakapesh is a Canadian documentary film, directed by Roger Frappier and Justin Kingsley and released in 2019. The film documents a 2018 tour by the Montreal Symphony Orchestra to perform Chaakapesh: The Trickster’s Quest, an indigenous-themed opera by Tomson Highway and Matthew Ricketts, in Cree and Inuit communities in Nord-du-Québec.

The film premiered at the Festival du nouveau cinéma on October 19, 2019, and received special screenings in several indigenous communities in February 2020. It was screened at the 2020 Cinéfest Sudbury International Film Festival, where it was named runner-up for the Audience Choice Award for documentaries.
