= Jason Eckardt =

American composer (born 1971)

Jason Eckardt (born 17 May 1971 in Princeton, New Jersey) is an American composer. He began his musical life playing guitar in heavy metal and jazz bands and abruptly moved to composing after discovering the music of Anton Webern.

== Compositions ==
Atonal and microtonal harmony, intricate rhythms, highly polyphonic textures and large-scale transformational processes are prevalent in Eckardt's compositions. Allan Kozinn of The New York Times wrote that Eckardt's music "celebrates harmonic prickliness, rhythmic complexity and a density of ideas". Though Eckardt has been associated with the New Complexity movement, he is also influenced by American composers Milton Babbitt and Elliott Carter.

Major works include Passage (2018) for string quartet, After Serra (2000) for chamber ensemble, Tongues (2001) for soprano and chamber ensemble, Reul na Coille (2002) for percussion and orchestra, Trespass (2005) for piano and chamber orchestra and the Undersong cycle (2002–2008), a series of four chamber works (A way [tracing], 16, Aperture, The Distance (This)) that, when played together without pause, form a concert-length supercomposition.

Some of Eckardt's compositions are inspired by extramusical subjects, such as extraordinary rendition (Rendition), the sculptures of Richard Serra (After Serra), W. S. Merwin's poem "Echoes" (Echoes' White Veil) and George W. Bush's 2003 State of the Union Address (16). Subject, part one of Passage, a work for string quartet, uses special concert lighting to recreate the conditions used to interrogate military detainees. Eckardt has also written about the influence of research in cognitive psychology on his compositional techniques.

Eckardt has received commissions for his work from several major institutions and performers including Carnegie Hall, Tanglewood, the Koussevitzky Foundation (1999, 2011), the Guggenheim Museum, the Fromm Foundation at Harvard University (1996, 2008), Chamber Music America, the New York State Music Fund, Meet the Composer, the Oberlin Conservatory and percussionist Evelyn Glennie. His works have been programmed internationally by festivals including the Festival d'Automne a Paris, IRCAM-Resonances, ISCM World Music Days (1999, 2000), Darmstädter Ferienkurse, Musica Strasbourg, Voix Nouvelles, Musik im 20. Jahrhundert, Musikhost, Currents in Musical Thought-Seoul, New Consortium, International Review of Contemporary Music, Festival of New American Music and the International Bartok Festival.

== Career ==
Eckardt has taught composition, theory and musicology at Columbia University, the Peabody Conservatory, the Oberlin Conservatory, New York University, the University of Illinois, Rutgers University and Northwestern University. He is also the co-founder of Ensemble 21, the contemporary music chamber ensemble based in New York City. He is currently Distinguished Professor of Composition at City University of New York's Conservatory of Music at Brooklyn College and Graduate Center.

== Awards ==
In 2004, Eckardt was awarded a Guggenheim Fellowship. Eckardt has also earned fellowships from the Rockefeller Foundation, the American Academy of Arts and Letters, Fondation Royaumont, the MacDowell and Millay colonies, the National Foundation for Advancement in the Arts, the Fritz Reiner Center for Contemporary Music, the Composers Conference at Wellesley, the Atlantic Center for the Arts, and the Yvar Mikhashoff Trust for New Music. Eckardt's compositions have received awards from the League of Composers/ISCM (National Prize), the Deutscher Musikrat (Stadt Wesel) (Symposium NRW Prize), ASCAP (Morton Gould Award), the University of Illinois (Salvatore Martirano Memorial Composition Award) and Columbia University (Rapoport Prize).

== Education ==
Eckardt attended Berklee College of Music, first as a guitar performance major before switching to composition, eventually earning a BA (1992). He continued his studies at Columbia University, principally with Jonathan Kramer, and earned MA (1994) and DMA (1998) degrees. He attended masterclasses with Milton Babbitt, James Dillon, Brian Ferneyhough, Jonathan Harvey, and Karlheinz Stockhausen.

== List of compositions ==
- Multiplicities (1993) for solo flute
- Flux (1994/95) for alto flute and 'cello
- Excelsior ab Intra (1994) for soprano, 2 countertenors, baritone
- A Harvest of Thorns (1995) for two guitars
- Echoes' White Veil (1996) for solo piano
- Tangled Loops (1996) for soprano saxophone and piano
- Cuts (1996) for solo piano
- Paths of Resistance (1997) for solo guitar
- Polarities (1998) for chamber ensemble
- Transience (1999) for solo marimba
- A Glimpse Retraced (1999) for piano and chamber ensemble
- After Serra (2000) for chamber ensemble
- Dithyramb (2001) for solo soprano
- Equilibrium (2001) for voice and guitar
- Tongues (2001) for soprano and chamber ensemble
- Performance (2001) for mezzo-soprano and piano
- Reul na Coille (2002) for solo percussion and orchestra
- 16 (2003) for amplified flute and string trio
- A Fractured Silence (2004) for saxophone quartet
- Mirror-glass skyscrapers (2004) for mezzo-soprano and piano
- Trespass (2005) for piano solo and chamber orchestra
- Rendition (2006) for bass clarinet and piano
- Sweet Creature (2006) for solo bodhrán
- A way [tracing] (2006) for solo 'cello
- Still (2007) for solo baritone saxophone
- Aperture (2007) for chamber ensemble
- The Distance (This) (2008) for soprano and chamber ensemble
- Riddle (2009) for piano solo
- Subject (2011) for string quartet with lighting
- Strömkarl (2012) for violin and piano
- pulse-echo (2013) for piano and string quartet
- Ascension (2014) for string quartet with lighting
- The Silenced (2015) a monodrama for flutist
- suspension/bridge (2015) for guitar solo
- Whorl (2016) for guitar and chamber ensemble
- Toll (2017) for piano four hands
- Compression (2017) for trombone solo
- Testify (2018) for string quartet with lighting
- a melody which the air had strained (2019) for piano solo
- Fated Nines (2020) for string trio
- Jarog (2021) for solo 'cello, two bows
- Cycles (2023) for 13 instruments
- A Compendium of Catskill Native Botanicals, book 2 (2014-)

== Discography ==
- Jason Eckardt: Passage (featuring JACK Quartet, Jason Hardink), Kairos 0022028KAI.
- Jason Eckardt: Subject (featuring JACK Quartet, Jordan Dodson, Marilyn Nonken and Oberlin Contemporary Ensemble, Eric Lamb and Jay Campbell, Tony Arnold and International Contemporary Ensemble), Tzadik 9006.
- Jason Eckardt: Undersong (featuring A way [tracing], 16, Aperture, The Distance (This)), Mode 234.
- Jason Eckardt: Out of Chaos (featuring After Serra, Tangled Loops, A Glimpse Retraced, Polarities), Mode 137.
- Stephanie Lamprea: Quaking Aspen (featuring Quaking Aspen), New Focus FCR313.
- Resonant Bodies/Tony Arnold: Resonant Bodies (featuring Dithyramb), New Focus FCR289.
- Claire Chase: Density 2036, iii (featuring The Silenced), CvsD CD076.
- Wendy Richman: vox/viola (featuring "to be held..."), New Focus/Tundra 008.
- Oerknal Ensemble: narrow numerous (featuring 16), 7 Mountain 012.
- Collide-O-Scope Music: Eidos (featuring Rendition), Hanging Bell 193428195981.
- Rebekah Heller: Metafagote (featuring Wild Ginger), New Focus/Tundra 006.
- Victoria Jordanova: Lady Fern (single), ArpaViva S001.
- Miranda Cuckson and Blair McMillen: Carter, Sessions, Eckardt (featuring Strömkarl), Urlicht 5989.
- Prism Saxophone Quartet: Dedication (featuring A Fractured Silence), Innova 800.
- Amy Briggs: Tangos for Piano (featuring Tango Clandestino), Revello RR7808.
- Jean Kopperud: Extreme Measures (featuring Rendition), Albany 1217/18.
- Claire Chase: Aliento (featuring 16), New Focus FCR 109.
- Nathan Nabb: Tangled Loops (featuring Tangled Loops), Amp 12.
- Michael Lipsey: So Long, Thanks... (featuring Sweet Creature), Capstone CPS-8773.
- Makoto Nakura: Ritual Protocol (featuring Transience), Kleos 5116.
- Nancy Ruffer: Multiplicities (featuring Multiplicities), Metier MSV92063.
- Marilyn Nonken: American Spiritual (featuring Echoes' White Veil), CRI 877.

== Publications ==
- "Broadening Knowledge: An Interview with Ursula Oppens." American Music Review, 2008.
- "L'élaboration de surface d'ensembles de classes de hauteurs par l'utilisation de paramèters autres que ceux des hauteurs." Musique-Sciences, 2007.
- "Process and Timbral Transformation in 16." Arcana: Musicians on Music, vol. 2. Hips Road. (ed. John Zorn), 2007.
- "Devenir." L'Etincelle/IRCAM. November 2006, no. 1, 2006.
- "Musikhøst Set Udefra." Dansk Musik Tidsskrift, no. 3, 2005.
- "Surface Elaboration of Pitch-Class Sets Using Nonpitched Musical Dimensions." Perspectives of New Music, vol. 43, no. 1, 2005.
- "Listening and Composing." Current Musicology, issue 67 & 68, 2002.
- "Review of An Introduction to the Music of Milton Babbitt by Andrew Mead." Current Musicology, issue 63, 2000.
