= Steven Rice (composer) =

American composer (born 1979)

Steven Rice (born 1979) is an American composer, who has written works for a variety of ensembles including orchestra and choir.

== Life and works ==
Rice studied music at the Eastman School of Music with Robert Morris and Carlos Sanchez-Gutierrez. His work for chamber ensemble Murmurs from Limbo won the 2005 Salvatore Martirano Memorial Composition Award, and he received a 2009 ASCAP Young Composer Award. Rice's orchestral work The Henry Ford Old Time Orchestra Plays Real American Tunes premiered in 2009 at the Cabrillo Festival of Contemporary Music.

== List of works ==
- The Henry Ford Old Time Orchestra Plays Real American Tunes for Orchestra (2009)
- Murmurs from Limbo for Alto, Tenor, and Chamber Ensemble (2004)
- Evolution of Deniz (Dance) for Choral Ensemble (2009)
