= Michael Seltenreich =

Israeli composer

Michael Seltenreich מיכאל זלטנרייך
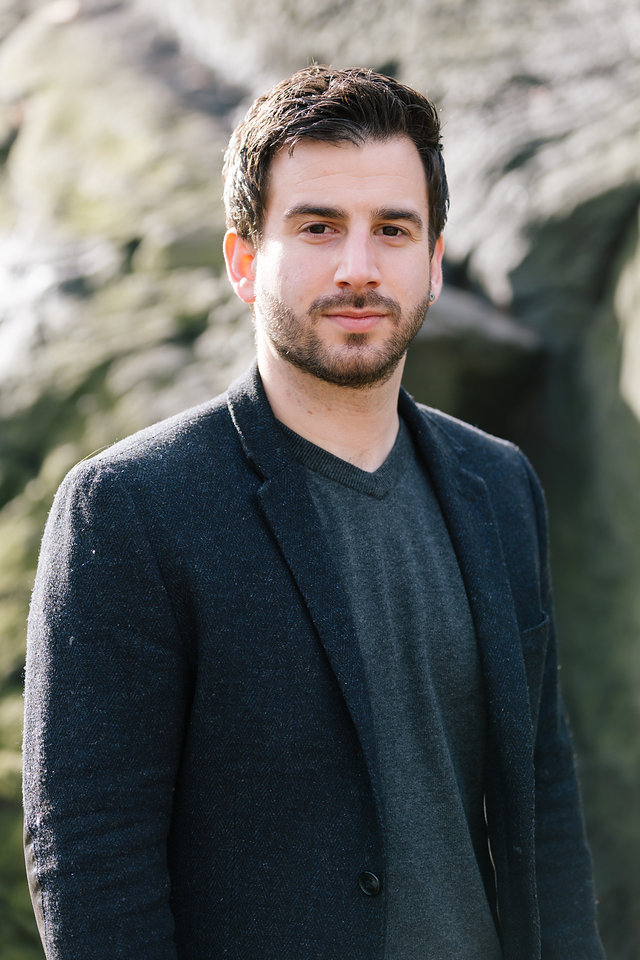
- Seltenreich, 2016

Background information
- Born: June 5, 1988 (age 37); Tel Aviv, Israel
- Genres: Contemporary classical; orchestral; experimental
- Occupation: Composer
- Years active: 2008–present
- Website: www.michaelseltenreich.com

Michael Seltenreich (Hebrew: מיכאל זלטנרייך; born 1988 in Tel Aviv) is an Israeli composer of contemporary classical music based in New York City. He is known for his distinctive, rhythmically captivating and technically sophisticated music, blending elements of modernism and experimentation. His works have been performed by leading ensembles and orchestras around the world, including the Munich Philharmonic, the Israel Philharmonic Orchestra, the Tokyo Philharmonic Orchestra, and the Juilliard Orchestra. He earned commissions from staple institutions such as Lucerne Festival, Aspen Music Festival, and Santa Fe Chamber Music Festival. Seltenreich was the first Israeli to win the prestigious Toru Takemitsu Composition Award and is a recipient of the Israel Prime Minister Award in Composition. In 2022, he received the Music Award from the American Academy of Arts and Letters.

== Biography ==
Seltenreich was born in Tel Aviv. He graduated from Thelma Yellin High School for The Arts in 2006. By 2011 he received a bachelor's degree in music composition from Buchmann-Mehta School of Music of Tel Aviv University, where he primarily studied with composer Gil Shohat. In 2014 he relocated to New York to pursue a master's degree from The Juilliard School. During his time at Juilliard, he studied primarily with German composer and conductor Matthias Pintscher. He later went on to earn a PhD at New York University as a MacCracken Doctoral Fellow.

== Critical reception ==
During the ISCM Award Ceremony in Beijing (2018), the jury described their motivations for selecting Seltenreich as the award winner and referred to his music as "engaging, effervescent, energetic, and assured" and that it "demonstrates detailed control of the materials and a sophistication that makes us eager to hear more".

Japanese composer, Toshi Ichiyanagi explained that Seltenreich's "sophisticated orchestration technique" and his music's "refinement in the way the nuances are brought out" along with its "richness of expression" were his motivations for selecting Seltenreich as a finalist for the Toru Takemitsu Composition Award. Finally, when he chose Seltenreich's piece, "ARCHETYPE", as the receipt of the 1st prize, Ichyanagi explained that it "was a very rare piece in that it was very precisely and densely written" presenting a "very modern motif that resulted in creating a very deep, thick musical texture".

Following a 2024 performance by the Munich Philharmonic, Michael Seltenreich's commissioned work The Prisoner’s Dilemma, was described as "fantastic, mysterious, infinitely delicate, and full of eruptive hardness".

== Selected works ==
=== Orchestral ===
- Comments regarding the aforementioned poem (2014) for string orchestra and narrator
- ARCHETYPE (2015) for symphony orchestra
- Élégie (2016) for solo piano, and string orchestra
- Psalm Symphony (2017) for narrator, choir, orchestra, and children's choir
- A Rube Goldberg Machine (2019) for symphony orchestra
- The Prisoner's Dilemma (2024) for symphony orchestra

=== Ensemble ===
- Sparks & Flares (2010) for flute, clarinet, percussion, piano, violin, and cello
- ICD-10 Chapter V: Mental and behavioral disorders (2018) for flute, oboe, clarinet, percussion, piano, 2 violins, viola, and cello
- Pardés (2019) for large ensemble
- Leuer (2021) for ensemble
- I never said she stole your money (2021) for voices & ensemble
- Ornamentation II (2022) for ensemble

=== Chamber ===
- Onot (2015) for string quartet
- Schnaïm (2016) for two pianos
- Stalgamite & Stalactite (2018) for string quartet
- Trajectories (2019) for double string quartet
- Sextet (2021) for piano and winds
- Ornamentation I (2021) for saxophone quartet

=== Solo ===
- Fantasy of a Broken Bridge (2010) for piano
- Lumière Lent (2015) for cello

=== Choral ===
- Water War (2008) for mixed choir, children's choir, and two percussionists
- Ligeia (2011) for women's choir and harp
- Notes From The Wailing Wall (2013) for 17 voices

== Selected awards ==
- 2022 American Academy of Arts and Letters Music Award
- 2018 International Society for Contemporary Music's Young Composer Award
- 2017 ACUM Award
- 2016 The Israeli Prime Minister's Award in Composition
- 2016 Toru Takemitsu Composition Award
- 2012 Salvatore Martirano Memorial Composition Award
