= Shiori Usui =

Shiori Usui is a composer of contemporary classical music, improvising musician and music animateur based in Scotland. She is originally from Japan.

== Career ==
Usui's music has been performed by orchestras and ensembles around the world including BBC Scottish Symphony Orchestra, Cottbus State Theatre Philharmonic Orchestra, Birmingham Contemporary Music Group, A Far Cry, Collegium Novum Zurich and Artisan Trio, and with conductors such as Ilan Volkov, Martyn Brabbins, Peter Rundel and Franck Ollu.

In 2018, Usui's composition "from scratch" was awarded the Scottish Awards for New Music for large ensemble and she was shortlisted for the Twenty Fifth Anniversary Awards by the Arts Foundation.

In 2017, "from scratch" was performed by BBC Scottish Symphony Orchestra and Usui as a vocalist with conductor Ilan Volkov at Tectonics Glasgow festival.

In 2016, Usui won a publishing deal with Ricordi Berlin.

In 2015, Usui's music "Ophiocordyceps unilateralis s.l." was performed at the BBC Proms by BCMG and conductor Franck Ollu.

In 2013 – 2014, Usui was awarded the Birmingham Contemporary Music Group/Sound and Music composer-in-residence, and Scottish Chamber Orchestra Connect Fellow funded by BBC Performing Arts Fund, for working with children with additional support needs.

In 2012, Usui's composition 'Warai' received the Toru Takemitsu Composition Award. In the same year, Usui was awarded a Civitella Ranieri fellowship in conjunction with UNESCO-Aschberg Bursary.

As an improvising musician, Usui has performed with artists and groups such as Arve Henriksen, Ilan Volkov, Rie Nakajima, Lee Patterson, Cato, Grey Area, BCMG and Collegium Novum Zurich.

As a music animateur, Usui has worked as a fellow in the Scottish Chamber Orchestra's outreach and education department, worked in various projects with school children and has had a training with Musicians Without Borders Edinburgh.
