= Claudia Montero =

Argentine composer (1962–2021)

- Born: 25 June 1962; Buenos Aires, Argentina
- Died: 16 January 2021 (aged 58); Valencia, Spain

Claudia Montero (25 June 1962 – 16 January 2021) was an Argentine composer resident in Spain.

== Biography ==
Montero studied music at the Alberto Ginastera Conservatory in Buenos Aires. Following her relocation to Valencia, she studied at the University of Valencia.

Montero won four Latin Grammy Awards over the years 2014, 2016, and 2018, and the award for best classical album in 2018. She was composer in residence with the Palau de Musica and the Valencia symphony Orchestra in Spain. The world première of Montero's piano concerto, Concierto en Blanco y Negro, was held in 2017 at the Galway International Arts Festival, with Clare Hammond as soloist.

Montero died of cancer on 16 January 2021, aged 58.
