= Orlando Jacinto Garcia =

Orlando Garcia
- Born: 1954 (age 71–72); Havana, Cuba
- Education: University of Miami
- Occupations: Classical composer; Academic teacher
- Organizations: Florida International University; Instituto Superior de Arte
- Awards: Salvatore Martirano Memorial Composition Award

Orlando Jacinto Garcia (born 1954; surname sometimes spelled García) is a Cuban-American composer of contemporary classical music.

== Life and career ==
Garcia received a DMA degree in composition from the University of Miami in 1985. He also studied composition with Morton Feldman.

Garcia served as director of the School of Music, and currently serves as director of the Composition Program, and professor of music at Florida International University in Miami, Florida.

He is a guest composer and lecturer at national and international festivals.

== Work ==
Garcia has composed an extensive catalog of works, and his music has been performed throughout North America, Europe, and Latin America. His music has been recorded by the New Albion, Composers Recordings, Inc., New World, O.O. Discs, North/South, Albany, Edición Sonora, Opus One, Contemporary Recording Studios (CRS), and Capstone labels. His scores are published by Kallisti Music Press, the American Composers Alliance, BHE, Rugginenti, and North/South Editions.

His music has been performed numerous artists such as Joan La Barbara, Bertram Turetzky, Luis Gómez-Imbert, Jan Williams, Joseph Celli, Odaline de la Martinez the Gregg Smith Singers, and many orchestras in the Americas and Europe.

Garcia is the founder and director of several international festivals that include the New Music Miami Festival and the Music of the Americas Festival. He is the founder and artistic director of the NODUS Ensemble and the Florida International University (FIU) New Music Ensemble.

== Awards and recognitions ==
Garcia is the recipient of numerous honors and awards from organizations and cultural institutions, including the Nuevas Resonancias, ACF Sonic Circuits, Bloch International Competition, and fellowships, residencies, and other awards from the Rockefeller, Fulbright, Dutka, and Cintas Foundation (1994/95 and 1999/2000), as well as the State of Florida Council for the Arts. He has received grants from the Rockefeller and Fulbright foundations, and is a two-time winner of the Cintas Foundation Fellowship. In 2001 he won the Salvatore Martirano Memorial Composition Award.
