= Yalil Guerra =

Cuban musician

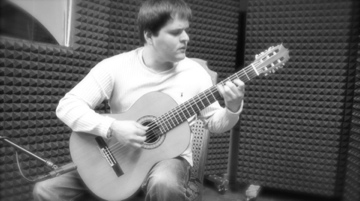
Cuban-American composer and guitarist Yalil Guerra

Yalil Guerra Soto (born April 27, 1973, in Havana, Cuba) is a Cuban-born composer, classical guitarist, record producer, arranger, educator, author, multi-instrumentalist, and conductor based in Los Angeles. He holds Spanish citizenship (since 1999) and U.S. citizenship (since 2007). Guerra is the son of the Cuban vocal duo Rosell y Cary.

== Career ==
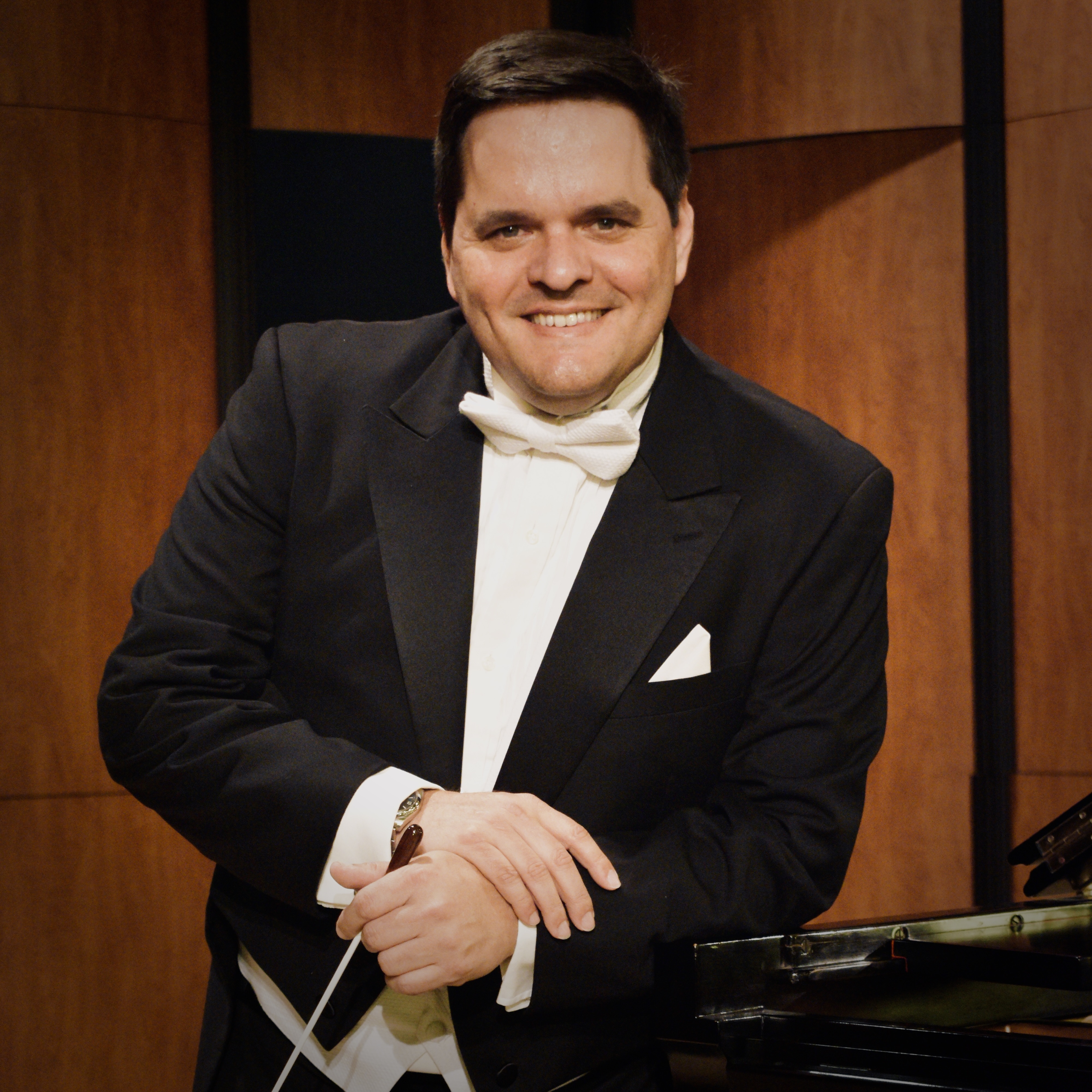
Conductor Yalil Guerra

Guerra has composed music for symphonic orchestra, string orchestra, concertos, chamber music, vocal music, and solo instruments. For over 15 years, he served as a composer, arranger, and producer for the U.S. TV network Univision, contributing to projects such as the 2010 FIFA World Cup, the Latin Grammy Awards (2005–2011), Sábado Gigante, Premio Lo Nuestro, and Mira quién baila. On November 15, 2012, Guerra won the Latin Grammy Award for Best Classical Contemporary Composition for his work "Seducción" from his album Live in L.A..

In 2010, Guerra was nominated for a Latin Grammy in the Best Classical Album category for his album "Old Havana."

The album titled "Cuba: The Legacy" was nominated in 2019 for a Latin Grammy in the Best Classical Album category.

== Education ==
Guerra graduated from the National School of Music (Escuela Nacional de Arte, ENA) in Havana, Cuba, with a Bachelor of Music degree in 1991. He continued his studies for two years at the Instituto Superior de Artes (ISA) in Havana. In 1997, he graduated from the Conservatorio Superior de Música in Madrid, Spain. He later obtained a second master's degree in Music (Film Scoring) from Shepherd University in Los Angeles in 2016. He completed his Doctor of Philosophy in Music (Composition and Music Theory) at the University of California, Los Angeles (UCLA) in 2021.

== Academic work ==
Yalil Guerra serves as adjunct faculty in Performing and Communication Arts at Pasadena City College. He is also on the music faculty of Los Angeles College of Music, Moorpark College, Antelope Valley College, College of the Canyons, and Ventura College. At College of the Canyons, he teaches piano lab, tonal harmony, and composition courses. Guerra has held past teaching positions at Shepherd University, Cal Poly Pomona, and University of La Verne.

== Awards and fellowships ==
- 1990 – Second Prize & Special Prize, International Classical Guitar Festival and Contest, Kraków, Poland (aged 16).
- 2019 – 20th Annual Latin Grammy Awards. Nomination for Best Classical Album, *Cuba: The Legacy*.
- 2018 – 19th Annual Latin Grammy Awards. Nomination for Best Classical Contemporary Composition, *String Quartet No. 3, in memoriam Ludvig van Beethoven*.
- 2015 – 16th Annual Latin Grammy Awards. Nomination for **Best Classical Contemporary Composition**, *El Retrato de la Paloma*; and **Best Classical Album**, *Yalil Guerra: Works for String Orchestra*.
- 2014 – 15th Annual Latin Grammy Awards. Nomination for Best Classical Contemporary Composition, *String Quartet No. 2*.
- 2012 – 13th Latin Grammy Award, Winner for Best Classical Contemporary Composition, for “Seducción”.
- 2010 – 11.ª Entrega Anual del Latin Grammy. Nominación a Mejor Álbum Clásico, Old Havana.
- Cintas Foundation Fellowship in Composition.
- Eugene Cota-Robles Fellowship, UCLA (2017).
- Lalo Schifrin Scholarship.
- Wise Family Scholarship.

== List of compositions ==
Orchestral works:

- Piano Concerto No. 1, "El Titán de Bronce" (2021).
- Symphony for Strings No. 2, "Los Dioses del Olimpo" – A composition for string orchestra (2019).
- "Al Partir" – A composition for string orchestra, dedicated to Cuban poet Gertrudis Gómez de Avellaneda (2019).
- "Negro Bembón" – A composition for string orchestra, dedicated to Cuban poet Nicolás Guillén (2019).
- Symphony No. 1, "La Palma Real" (2018).
- El Retrato de la Paloma – A composition for string orchestra (2012). Latin Grammy-nominated composition (2015). 16th Annual Latin Grammy Awards – Classical
- "Terra Ignota" – A composition for string orchestra (2009).
- Clave para Cuerdas y Percusión" – A composition for string orchestra (2009).
- "Old Havana" – A composition for string orchestra (2009).
- "A la Antigua" – A composition for string orchestra (2008).

Chamber works:

- String Quartet No. 4, "Noches de España" (2025) premiered in Los Angeles.
- String Quartet No. 3, in memoriam Ludvig van Beethoven (2016) – Latin Grammy-nominated composition (2017). 19th Annual Latin Grammy Awards – Classical
- String Quartet No. 2 (2014) – Latin Grammy-nominated composition (2014). 15th Annual Latin Grammy Awards – Classical
- String Quartet No. 1, "A Mil Guerra Solo" (2009).
- De congo y carabalí (2009)
- "Suite Cubana" (2007). - A composition for piano and string quartet.

Solo works:

- "Habanera No. 1" - A composition for piano (2022).
- "Aurelio de la Vega: El Gran Sequoia" - A composition for piano (2021).
- "Sonata No. 1: Siglo XXI" - A composition for piano (2013).
- "Toccata" - A composition for piano (2013).
- "Homenaje a Aurelio de la Vega" - A composition for piano (2012).
- Tres Piezas Cubanas: 1. Échale Salsita 2. Rosa Frívola 3. Zapateado – A composition for piano (2010).
- Suite "El Batey" - A composition for piano (2009).
- Seducción – A composition for piano (2009). Latin Grammy-winning composition (2017). 13th Annual Latin Grammy Awards – Classical
