= Jun Nagao =

Japanese composer (born 1964)

- Born: March 1, 1964; Ibaraki, Japan
- Other name: 長生 淳
- Occupation: composer

Jun Nagao (Japanese: 長生 淳; born March 1, 1964) is a Japanese composer.

Nagao began his career arranging for orchestras and wind ensembles. Today he is known for his many original compositions including several works for video games and films. He won the 2000 Toru Takemitsu Composition Award for his work entitled L'été-L'oubli rouge.

== Wind ensemble works ==
- Symphony (1997)
- Reminiscence (1997)
- Die Heldenzeit Concerto for Alto Saxophone and Wind ensemble (1998)
- The Other Garden Concerto for Euphonium and Wind ensemble (1998)
- Wavetops (2000)
- Souten no shizuku (2001)
- La saison lumineuse du vent vert (2002)
- Fluttering Maple Leaves (2003)
- Kompeki no Hatou (2005)
- Saiwai no Ryu(Der Glücksdrache) (2005)
- Auspicious Snow (2007)
- The Everlasting Trunk (2007)
- By Gathering Together (2008)
- Un morceau du ciel (2008)
- Sing with Sincerity (2008)
- Triton (2008)
- Four Seasons of Trouvère for saxophone and wind ensemble

== Chamber music ==
- Quatuor de Saxophones (2002)
- The Planets by Trouvere for saxophone quartet (2004)
- Paganini Lost for two alto saxophones and piano (2008)
- Dawn Passage for four clarinets
- Futarishizuka for solo flute
- Icare for trombone and piano
- Palsifaliana for trombone and piano
- Purity for solo flute
- Rhapsody on "Carmen" by Georges Bizet for saxophone quartet and piano

== Film music ==
- 2001 Le Petit poucet

== TV music ==
- 1993 Ryukyu no Kaze

== Video game music ==
- 1995 Romance of the Three Kingdoms IV – Wall of Fire originally titled San goku shi IV
