= Aurelio de la Vega =

American composer (1925–2022)

- Born: November 28, 1925; Havana, Cuba
- Died: February 12, 2022 (aged 96); Northridge, California, U.S.
- Education: De La Salle College, Havana; University of Havana; Ada Iglesias Music Institute, Havana
- Occupations: Composer, educator, essayist, poet
- Awards: Kennedy Center Friedheim Award (1978)

Aurelio de la Vega (November 28, 1925 – February 12, 2022) was a Cuban-American composer, lecturer, essayist, and poet. He wrote numerous works in many forms and media and, from the early 1960s, was an active force on the United States musical scene. Many of his compositions are published and recorded, and the majority of them are played constantly nationally and internationally. His music and aesthetic ideas have been commented upon and analyzed in books, newspapers and reviews throughout the United States and Latin America. In 1978 he was awarded the coveted Friedheim Award of the Kennedy Center for the Performing Arts, Washington, D.C., and was nominated four times for a Latin Grammy Award.

== Biography ==
De la Vega was born in Havana, Cuba, November 28, 1925, educated at De La Salle College, Havana, 1940–1944 (B.A. in humanities); University of Havana, 1944–1946 (M.A. in diplomacy); Ada Iglesias Music Institute, Havana, 1951–1958 (M.A. in musicology, 1956; Ph.D. in composition, 1958) and studied composition privately with Fritz Kramer in Havana (1943–1946) and Ernst Toch in California (1947–1948). After occupying important positions in his native land (editorial secretary of Conservatorio, official review of the Havana Municipal Conservatory, 1950–1953; music critic of newspapers Alerta (1952–1957) and Diario de la Marina (1957), Havana; president, Cuban Section of the International Society for Contemporary Music, 1952–1954; president, Cuban National Music Council (Cuban branch of the International Council of Music of UNESCO), 1953–1957; professor of music and chairman, music department, University of Oriente, Santiago de Cuba, 1953–1959; treasurer, Cuban Section of the Inter-American Music Association (Caracas), 1955–1958; vice-president, Havana Philharmonic Orchestra (1956–1957), he toured the United States as lecturer (1952–1954) and settled in Los Angeles in 1959, becoming an American citizen in 1966.

After being a guest professor of music at the University of Southern California, Los Angeles (summer 1959) he became distinguished professor of music, director of the electronic music studio and composer-in-residence at California State University, Northridge (1959–1992) and in 1971 he received the Outstanding Professor Award of the entire California State University system. He was a California State University, Northridge Distinguished Professor Emeritus.

In 1978 he received the Friedheim Award of the Kennedy Center for the Performing Arts, Washington, D.C., for his orchestral work "Adios" which was commissioned and premiered by Zubin Mehta and the Los Angeles Philharmonic. He was nominated four times for a Latin Grammy Award. Three of these nominations were for Best Classical Contemporary Composition: in 2009 for Variación del Recuerdo ("Variation of the Remembrance") for string orchestra, in 2012 for Prelude No. 1 for Piano and in 2017 for Recordatio for soprano, woodwind quintet and string quintet. His fourth nomination was in 2019 for Best Classical Album "Cuba: The Legacy".

De la Vega died in his home in Northridge, California, on February 12, 2022, at the age of 96.

== Compositions ==
Orchestra

- Obertura a Una Farsa Seria ("Overture to a Serious Farce") (1950)
- Introducción y Episodio ("Introduction and Episode") (1952) – commissioned by Frieder Weissmann
- Elegía ("Elegy"), for string orchestra (1954)
- Divertimento for Piano, Violin, Cello and String Orchestra (1956)
- Symphony in Four Parts (1960) – commissioned by Inocente Palacios for the Third Inter-American Music Festival
- Intrata (1972) – commissioned by Zubin Mehta and the Los Angeles Philharmonic Orchestra
- Adiós (“Farewell”) (1977) – commissioned by Zubin Mehta and the Los Angeles Philharmonic Orchestra
- Variación del Recuerdo ("Variation of the Remembrance"), for string orchestra (1999) – commissioned by the Culver City Chamber Orchestra

Chamber: instrumental

- La Muerte de Pan ("The Death of Pan"), for violin and piano (1948) – commissioned by Carlos Agostini
- Trio for Violin, Cello and Piano (1949) – commissioned by the Sociedad de Conciertos, La Habana
- Soliloquio ("Soliloquy"), for viola and piano (1950) – commissioned by Alberto Fajardo
- Leyenda del Ariel Criollo ("Legend of the Creole Ariel"), for cello and piano (1953) – commissioned by cellist Adolfo Odnoposoff and pianist Berthe Huberman
- String Quartet in Five Movements, "In Memoriam Alban Berg" (1957) – Havana Lyceum Publication Prize, Igor Markevitch, Presiding Juror
- Woodwind Quintet (1959)
- Trio for Flute, Oboe and Clarinet (1960)
- Structures, for piano and string quartet (1962) – commissioned by the Coolidge Foundation, The Library of Congress
- Segmentos ("Segments"), for violin and piano (1964) – commissioned by Robert Gross
- Exametron, for flute, cello and four percussionists (1965)
- Exospheres, for oboe and piano (1966) – commissioned by oboist John Ellis
- Labdanum, for flute, vibraphone and viola (1970) – commissioned by Peter Morelenbaum
- Septicilium, for solo clarinet and small instrumental ensemble (flute, harp, piano-celesta, one percussionist, violin and cello) (1974) – commissioned by the 1973 Festival of New Music, University of California, Los Angeles
- Olep ed Arudamot, for any number of instruments and/or voices (1974) – commissioned by Gloria Morris
- The Infinite Square, for any number of instruments and/or voices (1975) – commissioned by Gloria Morris
- Andamar-Ramadna, for any number of instruments and/or voices (1975) – commissioned by Gloria Morris
- The Magic Labyrinth, for any number of instruments and/or voices (1975) – commissioned by Gloria Morris
- Astralis, for any number of instruments and/or voices (1977) – commissioned by Francisco Lequerica
- Nones, for any number of instruments and/or voices (1977) – commissioned by Francisco Lequerica
- Corde, for any number of instruments and/or voices (1977) – commissioned by Francisco Lequerica
- Galandiacoa, for clarinet and guitar (1982) – commissioned by Julian Spear
- Tropimapal, for nine instruments (flute, clarinet, bassoon, trombone, one percussionist, violin, viola, cello and double bass) (1983) – commissioned by the Los Angeles American Chamber Symphony

Chamber: vocal

- Fuente Infinita ("The Infinite Fountain"), song cycle for soprano and piano on poems by José Francisco Zamora (1944) – commissioned by Magda Medina
- El Encuentro ("The Encounter"), for contralto and piano, on a poem by Rabindranath Tagore (1950)
- Cantata for Two Sopranos, Contralto and Twenty One Instruments, on poems by Roberto Fernández Retamar (1958)
- Inflorescencia ("Inflorescence"), for soprano, bass clarinet and pre-recorded sounds, on a poem by Aurelio de la Vega (1976)
- Adramante, for soprano and piano, on a poem by Octavio Armand (1985) – commissioned by the University of California, Santa Barbara, in honor of composer Ernest Krenek
- Asonante ("Assonant"), for soprano, dancer(s), seven instruments (flute, trumpet, trombone, piano, violin, cello and double bass) and pre-recorded sounds, on a poem by Aurelio de la Vega (1985) – commissioned by Franco Saltieri
- Magias e Invenciones ("Magics and Inventions"), song cycle for soprano and piano on poems by Gastón Baquero (1986) – commissioned by Fundación Música, Zaragoza, Spain
- Andamar-Ramadna (Version II), for any number of instruments and/or voices (1988) – commissioned by Gloria Morris
- Testimonial, for female voice, flute, clarinet, piano, violin and cello, on poems by Armando Valladares (1990) – commissioned by the Buenos Aires Encounters of Contemporary Music
- Madrigales de Entonces ("Madrigals from Another Time"), for SATB a cappella choir, on poems by Heberto Padilla (1991)
- Canciones Transparentes ("Transparent Songs"), for soprano, clarinet, cello and piano, on poems by José Martí (1995) – commissioned by Florida International University, Miami
- Variación del Recuerdo, Versión II ("Variation of the Remembrance", Version II), on a poem by Aurelio de la Vega, for six voices, clarinet and two percussionists (2005) – commissioned by the Moldenhauer * Foundation, The Library of Congress
- Recordatio ("Recollection"), for soprano, wind quintet and string quintet, on a poem by Emilio Ballagas (2011) – commissioned by North/South Consonance

Piano

- Tres Preludios (Three Preludes) (1944)
- Rondó (1948)
- Epigrama ("Epigram") (1953)
- Danza Lenta ("Slow Dance") (1956)
- Minuet (1957)
- Toccata (1957)
- Antinomies (1967) – commissioned by Peter Hewitt
- Homenagem ("Homage"),"In Memoriam Heitor Villa-Lobos" (1987) – commissioned by José Eduardo Martins

Guitar

- Sound Clouds (1975)
- Bifloreo (1992) – commissioned by guitarist Anton Machleder

Solo Instruments

- Interpolation, for solo clarinet with or without pre-recorded sounds (1965) – commissioned by clarinetist John Neufeld
- Undici Colori ("Eleven Colors"), for solo bassoon with or without projected transparencies of mixed media colored drawings by the composer (1981) – commissioned by the Klimt Foundation for bassoonist Donald Christlieb
- Memorial de la Ausencia ("Memorial of the Absence"), for unaccompanied cello (1985) – commissioned by Petroso Novares

Solo Instruments with pre-recorded sounds

- Interpolation, for solo clarinet with or without pre-recorded sounds (1965) – commissioned by Howard Pineridge
- Tangents, for violin and pre-recorded sounds (1973) – commissioned by Endré Granat
- Para-Tangents, for trumpet and pre-recorded sounds (1973) – commissioned by Thomas Stevens

Electronic music (solo tape only)

- Vectors, monaural tape (1963)
- Extrapolation, stereophonic tape (1981) – commissioned by the University of California, Los Angeles, and the Los Angeles Philharmonic Orchestra for the Los Angeles Music of the 80s Festival
