= Sakae Tsuboi =

Japanese novelist and poet (1899–1967)

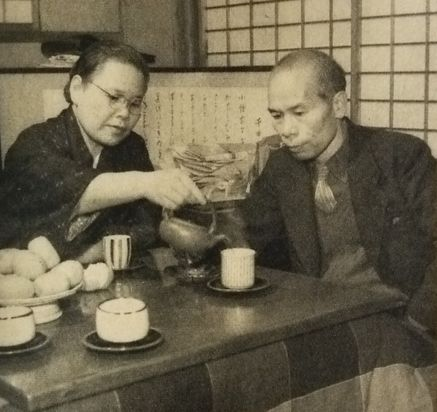
- Sakae Tsuboi and Shigeji Tsuboi.
- Born: 5 August 1899; Sakate, Kagawa, Japan
- Died: 23 June 1967 (aged 67)
- Occupations: novelist, poet
- Spouse: Shigeji Tsuboi (1925-1967)

Sakae Tsuboi (壺井 栄, Tsuboi Sakae; 5 August 1899 – 23 June 1967) was a Japanese novelist and poet.

== Biography ==
=== Early life ===
Sakae Tsuboi was born in the village of Sakate (now part of the town of Shōdoshima) in Kagawa Prefecture, the fifth daughter of soy sauce barrel maker, Tokichi Iwai. Despite the bankruptcy of her father's employer, and the consequent worsening of her family's economic situation, she was still able to complete eight years of schooling, before going on to work in the post office and town hall. In 1925, at the age of 26, she went to Tokyo to marry Shigeji Tsuboi.

=== Career ===
After the publication of her debut work Daikon no Ha (Radish Leaves) in 1938, she wrote prolifically, winning the Minister of Education Award for Fine Arts among other prizes. In 1954 the director Keisuke Kinoshita made a film adaptation, starring Hideko Takamine, of her 1952 novel, Nijushi no Hitomi (Twenty-Four Eyes), and Shodoshima became a household name in Japan. In 1967, she was made an honorary citizen of Uchinomi, Kagawa before dying the same year at the age of 67.

=== Sakae Tsuboi Prize ===
In 1979, to honour Tsuboi's work, Kagawa Prefecture established the Sakae Tsuboi Prize for children from the prefecture.

== Important works ==
- Daikon no Ha (大根の葉 Radish Leaves)
- Kaki no Ki no Aru Ie (柿の木のある家 The House with the Persimmon Tree)
- Haha no Nai Ko to Ko no Nai Haha to (母のない子と子のない母と The Motherless Children and the Childless Mother)
- Sakamichi (坂道 The Slope)
- Nijushi no Hitomi (二十四の瞳 Twenty-Four Eyes) - (the only work readily available in English translation) The most famous of her works, adapted into two movies (Twenty-Four Eyes), numerous TV series and one animation series.
- Kaze (風 The Wind)
- Ishiusu no Uta (石臼の歌 The Song of Millstone)
- Tsukiyo no Kasa (月夜の傘 Umbrella on a Moonlit Night)
