= Allium togashii =

Scientific classification
- Kingdom: Plantae
- Clade: Tracheophytes
- Clade: Angiosperms
- Clade: Monocots
- Order: Asparagales
- Family: Amaryllidaceae
- Subfamily: Allioideae
- Genus: Allium
- Species: A. togashii

Binomial name
- Allium togashii Hara

Species of plant

Allium togashii is a plant species endemic to Japan. It is known only from Shikoku: Kankakei, and Azuki, although it is cultivated in other counties for its attractive floral arrays. It is a small, delicate plant with thin scapes and a feathery-looking umbel of very pale lavender flowers.
