= Ikeda, Kagawa =

Dissolved municipality in Kagawa prefecture, Japan

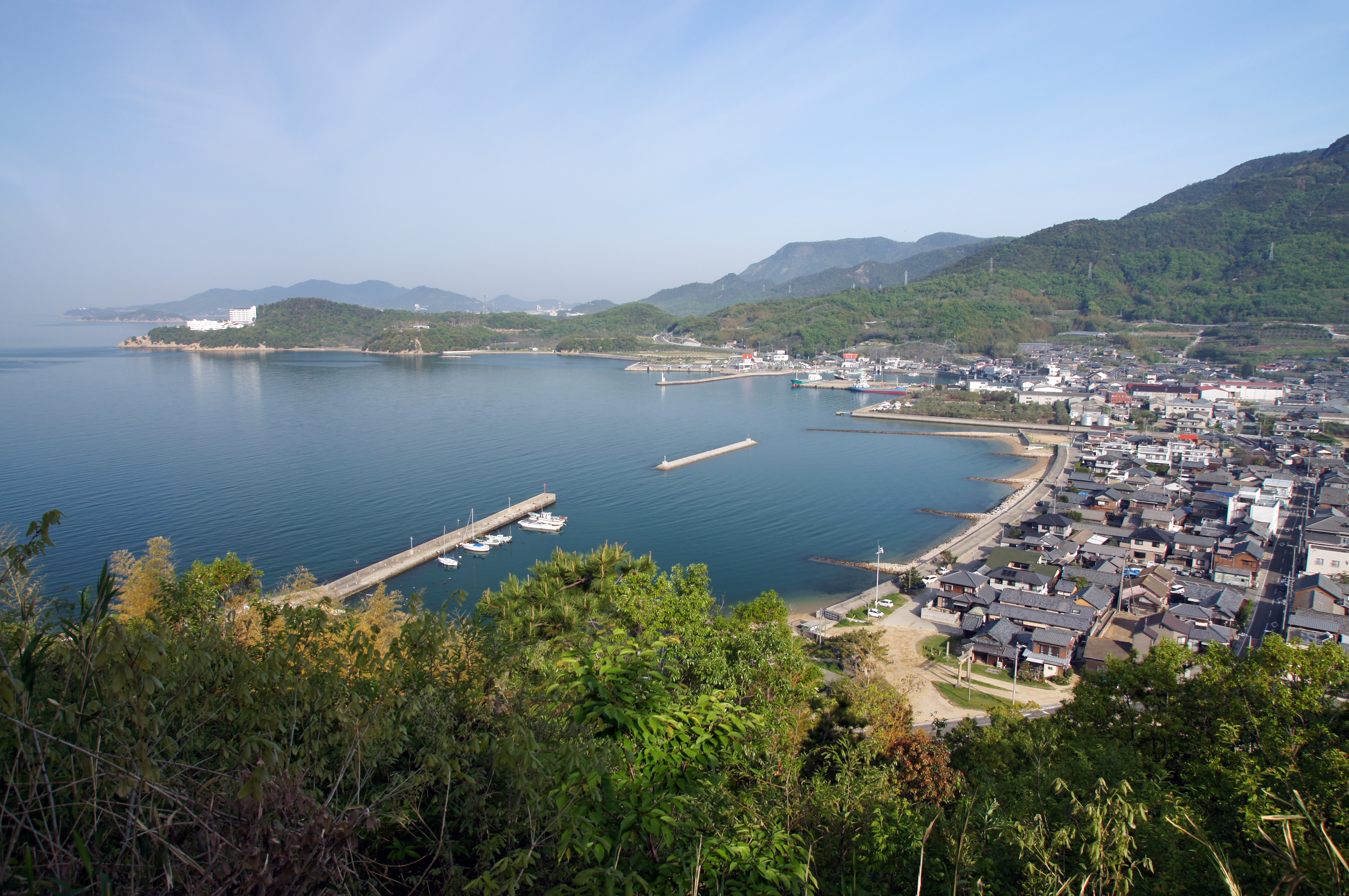
Port of Ikeda, looking west

Ikeda (池田, Ikeda) is a port and former town, now a part of Shōdoshima Town, Kagawa Prefecture, Japan. It is located midway along the south coast of Shōdoshima, the second-largest island in the Seto Inland Sea. The port is one of three on the island with passenger service to Takamatsu, the prefecture capital.

The community was designated a village in 1889, upgraded to a town in 1929, and merged with the villages of Nibu and Mito in 1954. In 2006, as part of nationwide mergers, Ikeda and the town of Uchinomi (both from Shōzu District) were merged to create the new town of Shōdoshima. Ikeda is no longer an independent municipality.
