= Olive Jinja =

Coordinates: 34°30′35″N 134°19′33″E

Olive Jinja 峰俐富神社

Religion
- Affiliation: Shinto
- Deity: Peace and Happiness

Location
- Location: Yasuda, Shōdoshima, Kagawa Prefecture, Japan
- Interactive map of Olive Jinja 峰俐富神社

Architecture
- Established: 1973

Olive Jinja (峰俐富神社 or オリーブ神社) is a Greek-style Shinto shrine on the island of Shōdoshima in the Inland Sea, Kagawa Prefecture, Japan. Constructed in 1973 and standing amidst a grove of olives - a thriving industry on the island - the shrine takes the form of a replica Greek temple, with stylobate, Doric columns, entablature with triglyphs, and bronze pedimental reliefs. There is an annual festival with Greek themes. The shrine is located within Setonaikai National Park.

== See also ==
- Ancient Greek architecture
- Olive branch
- Kankakei
