= Militarized Streets =

Antimilitarist Japanese novel (1930) by Kuroshima Denji

Militarized Streets (武装せる市街, Busō seru shigai) is a 1930 novel by Japanese Marxist writer Kuroshima Denji (1898–1943). Researched in China, the novel focuses on the so-called Jinan Incident, one of the early armed clashes that would eventually lead to a full-scale war between Japan and China.

== Setting ==
The incident took place in the spring of 1928 in Jinan, the capital of Shandong province, during a northward advance by Chinese nationalist troops attempting to reunify the country. Possessing considerable commercial and industrial investments in Jinan, and faced with a collapse of its favored warlord in the area, Japan rushed in its own troops, ostensibly to safeguard the Japanese residents of the city. After a tense standoff, Japanese units clashed with their Chinese counterparts. The Japanese army, needing reinforcements, claimed that hundreds of Japanese residents had been massacred by the Chinese troops. Although the dead actually numbered no more than thirteen or fourteen suspected opium smugglers, Japanese newspapers reacted to their deaths with outrage and demanded armed intervention. Japan’s prime minister dispatched an additional division to the region, and the troops launched an attack against Jinan, killing and wounding thousands of Chinese civilians.

== Theme ==
Kuroshima's novel depicts a broad array of people, including mercilessly exploited Chinese factory workers, impoverished Japanese residents, and increasingly radicalized Japanese soldiers. Staunchly antimilitarist in tone, the novel was instantly banned, censored again fifteen years later by the US occupation authorities, and not reprinted in full until 1970, four decades after its initial publication. The poet and essayist Shigeji Tsuboi, Kuroshima’s lifelong friend who was instrumental in publishing the work, has commended its uncompromising anti-imperialism. The novel remains little known even in present-day Japan, despite being a prominent text in the annals of Japanese proletarian literature.

Militarized Streets analyzes an exploitative system in action, cautions against an impending imperialist war, and suggests a path to a humane and peaceful world — through forging powerful bonds of international solidarity. Although written decades ago, Kuroshima’s book remains startlingly and tragically timely in a world of nationalist-driven military intervention.

== English translation ==
A complete English translation of Militarized Streets is available in A Flock of Swirling Crows and Other Proletarian Writings by Kuroshima Denji (Honolulu: University of Hawai‘i Press, 2005).
