= Denji Kuroshima =

Japanese writer

- 黒島 伝治
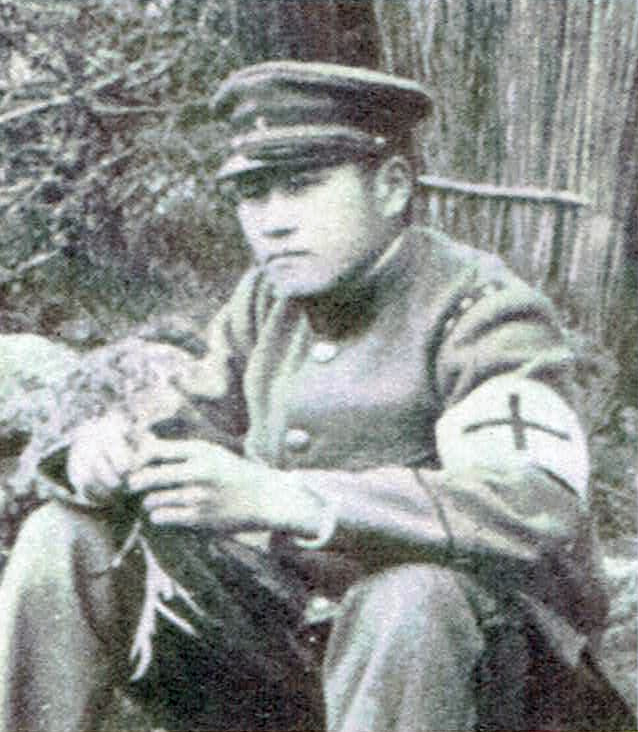
- Born: December 12, 1898; Shōdoshima, Kagawa, Japan
- Died: October 17, 1943 (aged 44); Shōdoshima, Kagawa, Japan
- Education: Waseda University
- Children: 3
- Writing career
- Language: Japanese
- Notable work: Militarized Streets (1930)
- Movement: Proletarian literature

Japanese name
- Kanji: 黒島 伝治
- Hiragana: くろしま でんじ
Transcriptions
- Romanization: Kuroshima Denji

Denji Kuroshima (黒島 伝治, Kuroshima Denji; December 12, 1898 – October 17, 1943) was a Japanese author.

== Personal life ==
A self-taught writer of humble social origins, Kuroshima was born on Shōdoshima in the Inland Sea and went to Tokyo to work and study. Conscripted into the army in 1919, he was sent to fight in the ultimately unsuccessful Siberian intervention waged against Russian communist forces by Japan and its allies, including the US and Britain. Upon his return, Kuroshima joined a flourishing proletarian literature movement and published his narratives in a variety of journals. His passionately anti-imperialist novel was researched in China. As his health began to fail in the early 1930s, Kuroshima returned to his native island where he lived with his wife and three children.

== Works ==
One of modern Japan's most dedicated antimilitarist intellectuals, Kuroshima Denji is best known for his Siberian stories of the late 1920s – vivid descriptions of agonies suffered by Japanese soldiers and Russian civilians during Japan's invasion of the newly emerged Soviet Union. Kuroshima also wrote powerful narratives dealing with the hardships, struggles, and rare triumphs of Japanese peasants. His only full-length novel, Militarized Streets, a shocking description of economic and military aggression against China, was censored not just by Japan's imperial government, but by the US occupation authorities as well.

== Literary style ==
Kuroshima's narratives—like those of Anton Chekhov, whom Kuroshima admired—are unadorned in style, straightforward in storytelling, and attentive to detail. Their content conveys a sense of authenticity, grief over the unnecessary suffering, and above all the urgent need for change. Despite occasional flashes of humor and lyricism, the tone is rarely cheerful and happy endings are uncommon: Kuroshima refrains from accomplishing in fiction what is much harder to attain in actuality. Devoid of easy optimism, his stories are open-ended chronicles of abuse and resistance.

Ultimately, Kuroshima is convinced only a vast international movement based on grassroots solidarity stands a chance of replacing a heartless status quo with a sane, livable world of justice and generosity. Meanwhile, faced with the daily tragedies of an irrationally structured world, radical artists everywhere are bound to persevere in their oppositional work. In his 1929 essay 'On Antiwar Literature', Kuroshima writes: "So long as the capitalist system exists, proletarian antiwar literature must also exist, and fight against it."

== See also ==
- Japanese literature
- List of Japanese authors
- Proletarian literature
- Shodoshima (Shodo Island)
