= Uchinomi, Kagawa =

Dissolved municipality in Kagawa prefecture, Japan

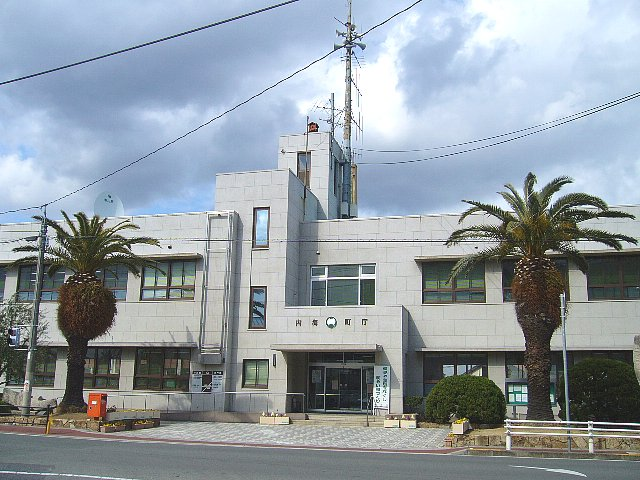
Former town hall

Uchinomi (内海町, Uchinomi-chō) was a former town in Shōzu District, Kagawa Prefecture, Japan. The town was created in 1949 by merging villages on the eastern part of Shōdoshima, an island in the Seto Inland Sea. In 2006, Uchinomi was dissolved and merged with the town of Ikeda (also from Shōzu District) to create the new town of Shōdoshima.

The former villages of Nishimura, Kusakabe, Yasuda, Nōma, Sakate, and Fukuda belonged to Uchinomi.
