= Angel Road (sandbar) =

Sandbar in Japan

Angel Road エンジェルロード (Japanese)
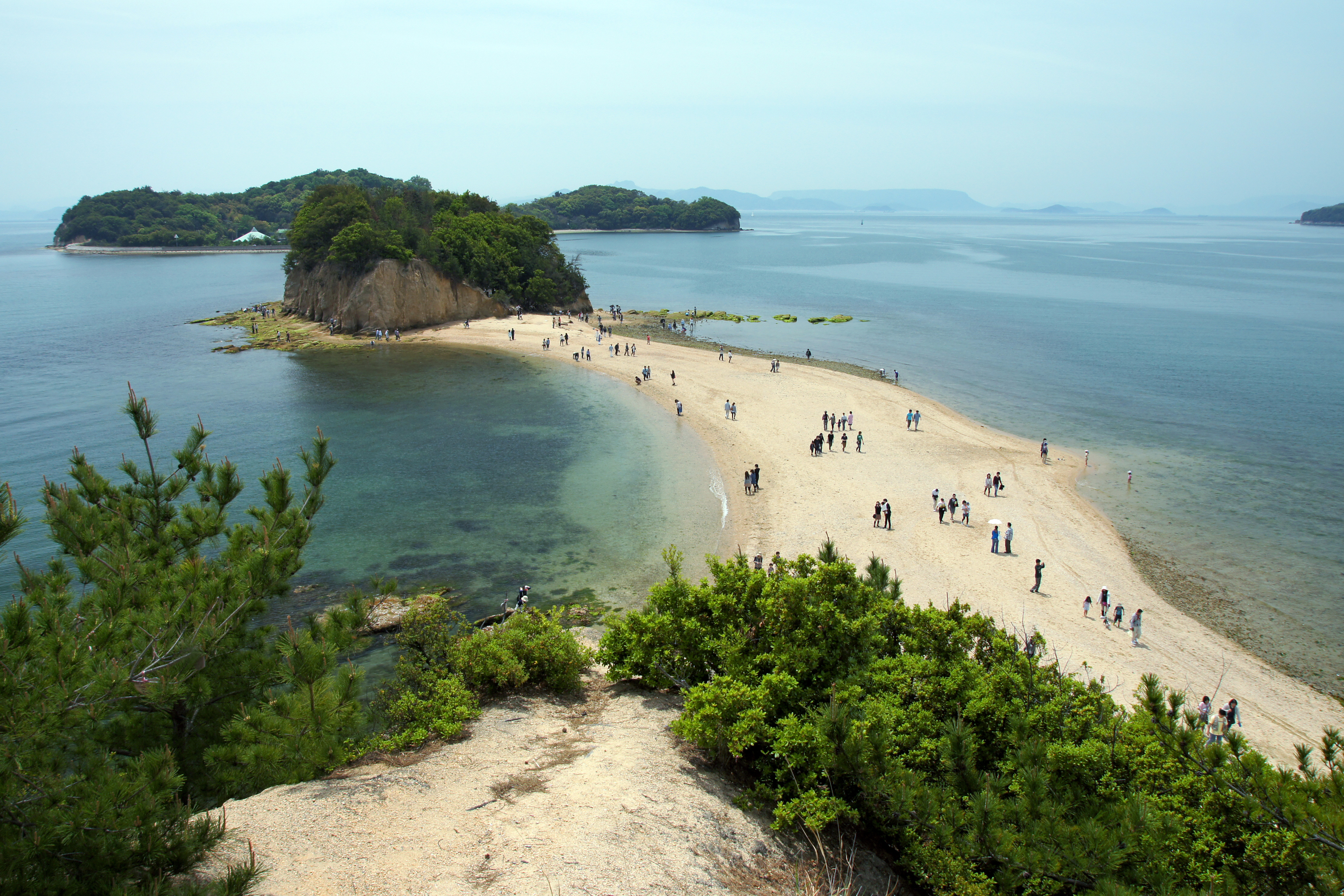
- Angel Road during low tide
- Interactive map of Angel Road
- Coordinates: 34°28′38″N 134°11′18.8″E
- Location: Tonoshō, Kagawa, Japan

Dimensions
  - Length: 500 m

Angel Road (Japanese: エンジェルロード) is a sandbar and tourist attraction in Tonoshō, Kagawa, Japan. The site is popular for the legend that when two people cross while holding hands, typically couples, a wish will be granted.

== Geography ==
The 500 m sandbar connects the town of Tonshō on the island of Shōdoshima to three minor islets of Nakayoshima (中余島), Koyoshima (小余島), and Oyoshima (大余島), all in the Seto Inland Sea.The sandbar is only out of the water and able to be walked for a few hours of the day due to the tides.

== Legend ==
A major reason for the popularity of the Angel Road is a legend saying that if a couple crosses the sandbar while holding hands, then a wish will come true. A hill on the main island side named the Hill of Promises overlooks the sandbar and has a large bell Couples are supposed to announce their love while ringing the bell. On Nakayoshima couples are supposed to write their wishes a wooden ema votive plaque and leave it hanging on a tree. The legend led to the attraction's designation as a "Lover's Sanctuary" in 2009.

While the legend is presented as a long-standing tradition, the earliest uses of the name Angel Road come from the 1970s. The sandbar was then promoted as an attraction by the local government starting in the early 2000s.

== In pop culture ==
Angle Road has appeared in a number of films and television series due to its legend. Some of the media include the 2009 film Me and My Mom's Yellow Bicycle (Japanese: ぼくとママの黄色い自転車, Hepburn: Boku to Mama No Kiiroi Jitensha) and the 2014 film Setouchi Pirate Story (Japanese: 瀬戸内海賊物語, Hepburn: Setouchi Kaizoku Monogatari).
