= Shōdoshima, Kagawa =

Shōdoshima 小豆島町
- Town
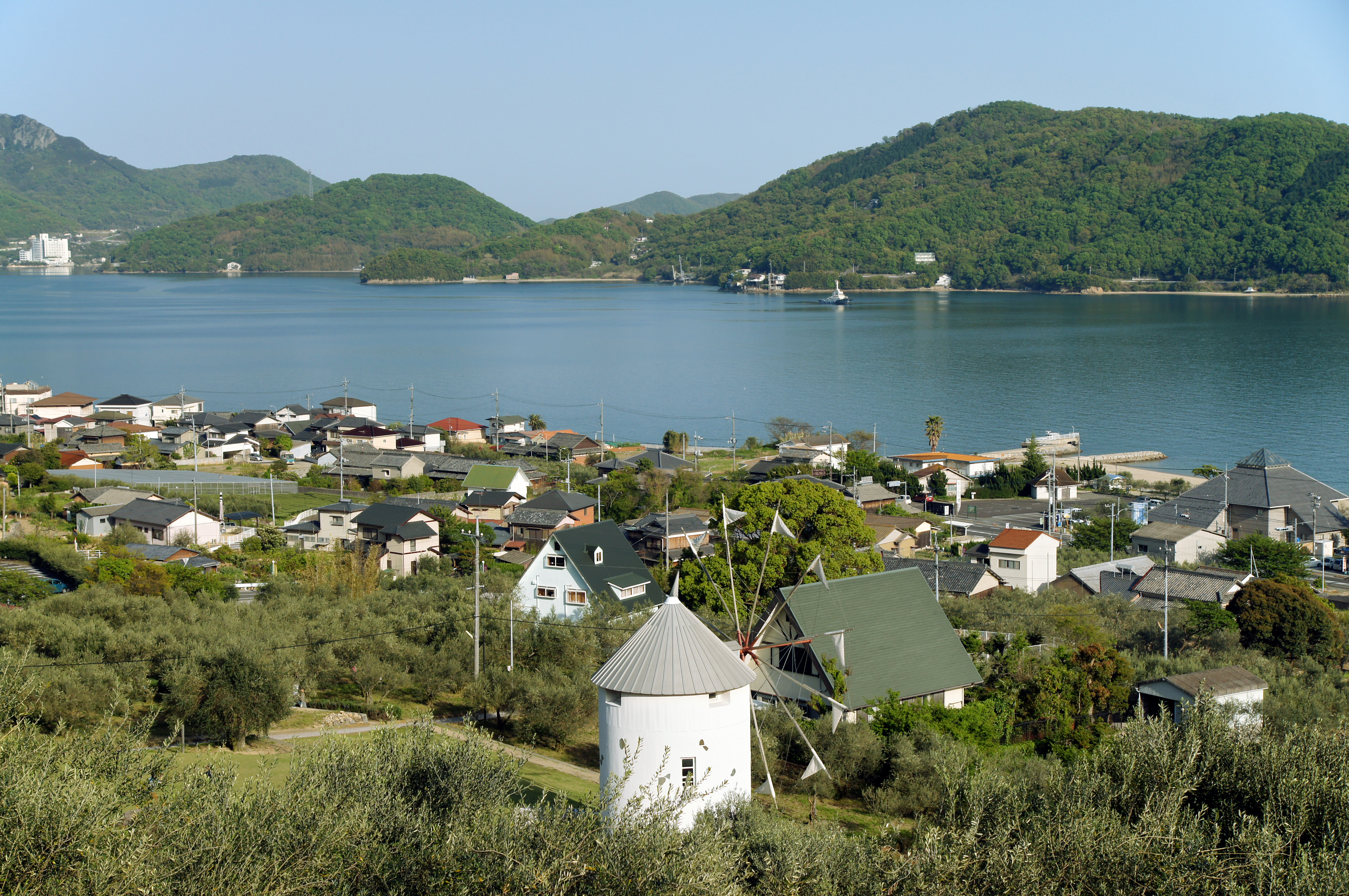
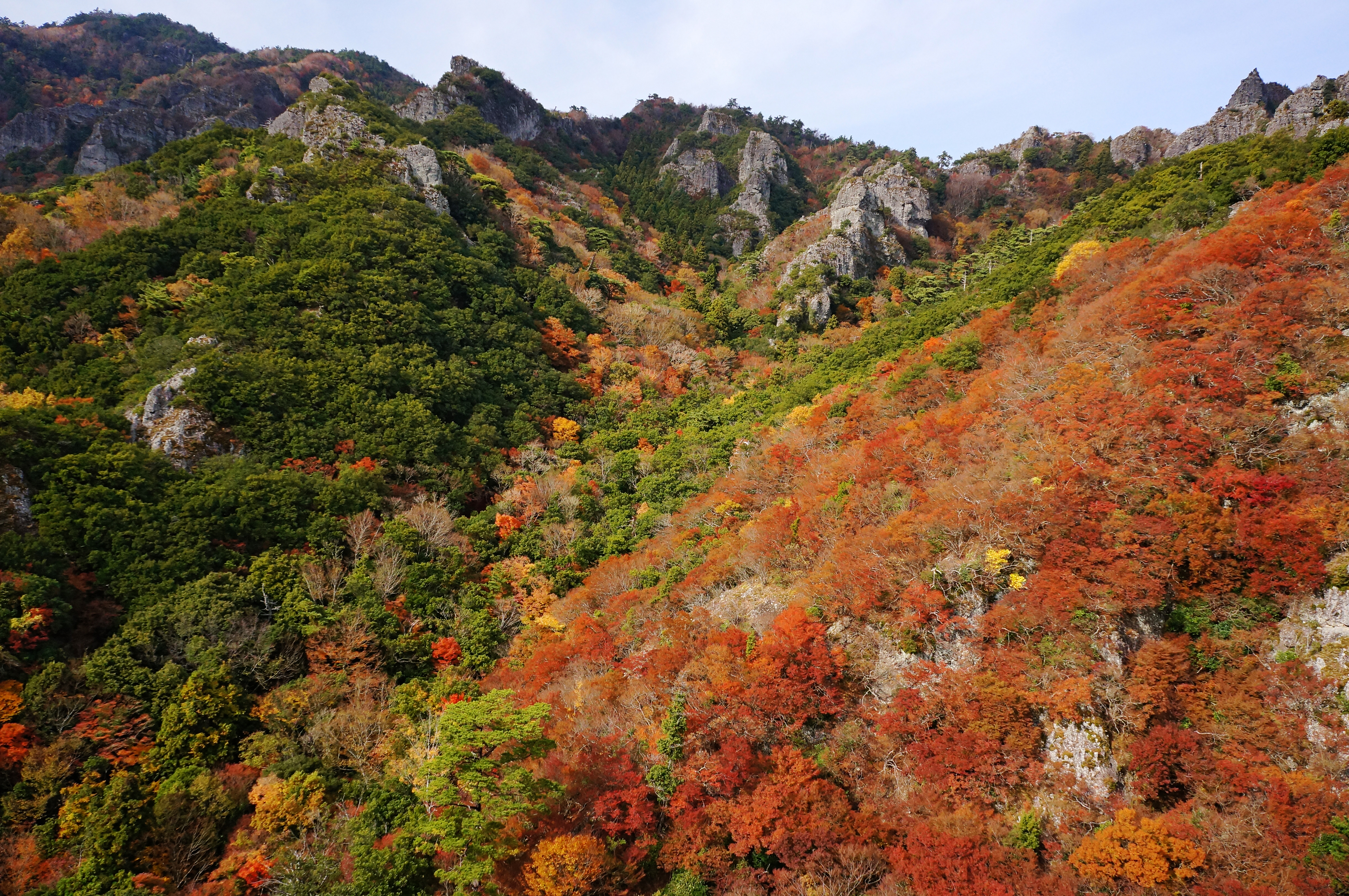
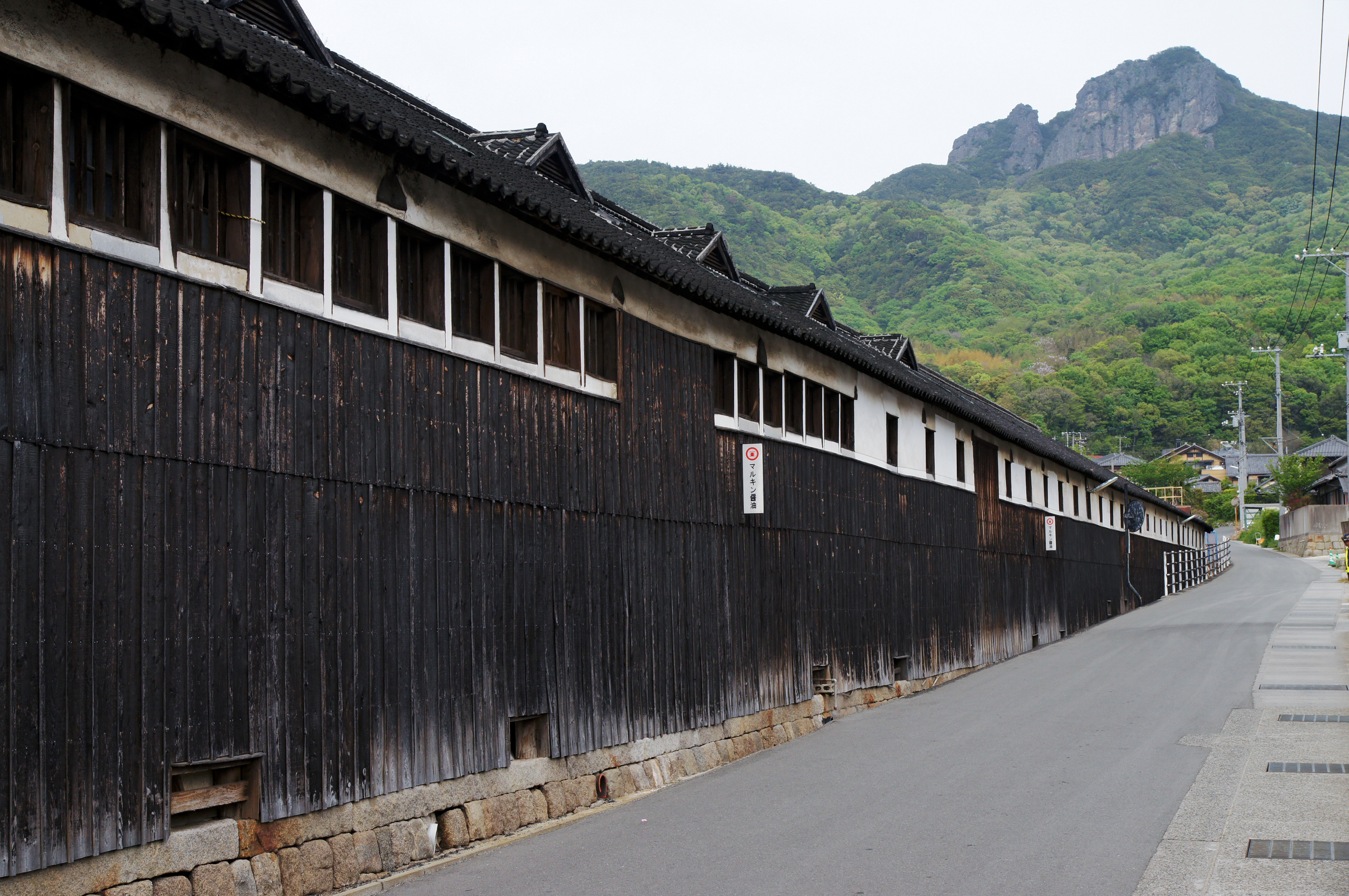
- Clockwise from top: Bay looking south from Olive Park, soy sauce warehouse, Kankakei Gorge

- Flag Seal

- Location of Shōdoshima in Kagawa Prefecture

- Location in Japan
- Coordinates: 34°29′N 134°14′E
- Country: Japan
- Region: Shikoku
- Prefecture: Kagawa Prefecture
- District: Shōzu

Government
  - Mayor: Masahiko Oe

Area
  - Total: 95.59 km^{2} (36.91 sq mi)

Population (2020)
  - Total: 13,646
  - Density: 142.8/km^{2} (369.7/sq mi)
- Time zone: UTC+09:00 (JST)
- City hall address: 2100-4 Ikeda, Shōdoshima-chō, Shōzu-gun, Kagawa-ken; 761-4388
- Climate: Cfa
- Website: www.town.shodoshima.lg.jp
- Symbols
- Flower: Olive
- Mascot: Olive Shimachan
- Tree: Olive

Shōdoshima (小豆島町, Shōdoshima-chō) is a town in Kagawa Prefecture, Japan, with a population of 13,646. The town was established in 2006 and covers various ports and communities on the eastern half of Shōdoshima, the second-largest island in the Seto Inland Sea. Shōdoshima is roughly halfway between the much larger islands of Shikoku to the south and Honshu to the north, and has a mild and relatively dry climate.

Soy sauce production, which flourished through the early 20th century, remains a major industry. Other industries include sōmen noodles, tsukudani (made with soy sauce), fishing and agriculture. In Japan, olives were first successfully cultivated here in the 1910s and olive oil production resurged in the late 20th century.

Tourism is also economically important. Shodoshima participates in the Setouchi Triennale, a regional art festival, and the mountainous interior is home to Kankakei Gorge. The book and film Twenty-Four Eyes was set on the island, and a movie studio park and museum attracts visitors.

== Geography ==
=== Notable locations ===
The town of Shōdoshima was created in 2006 by merging the former towns of Ikeda and Uchinomi, both from Shōzu District. The total area is 95.59 km^{2}, and covers the entire eastern half of the island of Shōdoshima. Notable communities and locations include:

- Kankakei Gorge
- Kusakabe, a port and community, with soy sauce production concentrated to the east
- Olive Park/Olive Garden, olive orchards and tourist sites
- Sakate, a port in the southeast
- Twenty-Four Eyes Movie Studio, a tourist site for the book and film Twenty-Four Eyes

=== Climate ===
Shōdoshima has a humid subtropical climate (Köppen climate classification Cfa) with hot, humid summers, and cool winters. Some rain falls throughout the year, but the months from May to September have the heaviest rain. The average annual temperature in Shōdoshima is 16.0 °C (60.8 °F). The average annual rainfall is 1,161.3 mm (45.72 in) with July as the wettest month. The temperatures are highest on average in August, at around 27.4 °C (81.3 °F), and lowest in January, at around 5.6 °C (42.1 °F). The highest temperature ever recorded in Shōdoshima was 38.4 °C (101.1 °F) on 21 August 2000; the coldest temperature ever recorded was −6.6 °C (20.1 °F) on 26 February 1981.

Climate data for Uchinomi, Shōdoshima (1991−2020 normals, extremes 1978−present)
Month	Jan	Feb	Mar	Apr	May	Jun	Jul	Aug	Sep	Oct	Nov	Dec	Year
Record high °C (°F)	19.4 (66.9)	23.9 (75.0)	24.9 (76.8)	29.4 (84.9)	30.9 (87.6)	35.3 (95.5)	37.5 (99.5)	38.4 (101.1)	37.8 (100.0)	31.7 (89.1)	26.4 (79.5)	21.4 (70.5)	38.4 (101.1)
Mean daily maximum °C (°F)	9.6 (49.3)	10.3 (50.5)	13.6 (56.5)	19.0 (66.2)	23.6 (74.5)	26.5 (79.7)	30.5 (86.9)	32.3 (90.1)	28.5 (83.3)	23.1 (73.6)	17.5 (63.5)	12.2 (54.0)	20.6 (69.0)
Daily mean °C (°F)	5.6 (42.1)	5.9 (42.6)	8.8 (47.8)	13.9 (57.0)	18.5 (65.3)	22.1 (71.8)	26.1 (79.0)	27.4 (81.3)	24.0 (75.2)	18.6 (65.5)	13.2 (55.8)	8.1 (46.6)	16.0 (60.8)
Mean daily minimum °C (°F)	1.9 (35.4)	1.9 (35.4)	4.3 (39.7)	9.2 (48.6)	14.0 (57.2)	18.5 (65.3)	22.8 (73.0)	24.0 (75.2)	20.5 (68.9)	14.8 (58.6)	9.3 (48.7)	4.4 (39.9)	12.1 (53.8)
Record low °C (°F)	−4.7 (23.5)	−6.6 (20.1)	−4.7 (23.5)	−0.6 (30.9)	5.3 (41.5)	10.8 (51.4)	15.5 (59.9)	16.6 (61.9)	11.8 (53.2)	4.9 (40.8)	1.3 (34.3)	−3.1 (26.4)	−6.6 (20.1)
Average precipitation mm (inches)	36.7 (1.44)	43.2 (1.70)	77.6 (3.06)	78.4 (3.09)	113.9 (4.48)	156.7 (6.17)	164.9 (6.49)	116.7 (4.59)	175.6 (6.91)	118.6 (4.67)	54.4 (2.14)	42.9 (1.69)	1,161.3 (45.72)
Average precipitation days (≥ 1.0 mm)	5.6	6.9	9.4	9.2	8.9	10.6	9.5	6.4	8.6	7.7	6.3	5.9	95
Mean monthly sunshine hours	154.1	144.9	177.5	197.2	208.7	159.4	189.3	220.0	155.5	163.0	150.1	151.3	2,074.5
Source: Japan Meteorological Agency

== Demographics ==
Per Japanese census data, the population of Shōdoshima in 2020 is 13,870 people. Shōdoshima has been conducting censuses since 1920.

Historical population
Year	Pop.	±%
1920	23,363	—
1925	23,840	+2.0%
1930	25,496	+6.9%
1935	26,292	+3.1%
1940	24,820	−5.6%
1945	33,328	+34.3%
1950	32,144	−3.6%
1955	30,073	−6.4%
1960	27,567	−8.3%
1965	25,576	−7.2%
1970	23,448	−8.3%
1975	22,519	−4.0%
1980	22,170	−1.5%
1985	21,433	−3.3%
1990	20,455	−4.6%
1995	19,700	−3.7%
2000	18,303	−7.1%
2005	17,257	−5.7%
2010	16,152	−6.4%
2015	14,862	−8.0%
2020	13,870	−6.7%
Shōdoshima population statistics
