= Kaoru Maruyama =

Japanese poet

Kaoru Maruyama Maruyama Kaoru (丸山 薫; June 8, 1899 – October 21, 1974) was a Japanese poet. His collected works were translated by Robert Epp. He was the professor first in Tokyo and later at Aichi University. Ten Years, Fairy Country, and Heart of flowers are his best-known books. He is sometimes called "the poet of the sea".

== Four Seasons ==
He was an editor of Four Seasons Literary Magazine and a member of the "Shiki" or Four Seasons group. Four Seasons published 81 issues between 1934 and 1944.
