= Tonoshō, Kagawa =

Tonoshō 土庄町
- Town
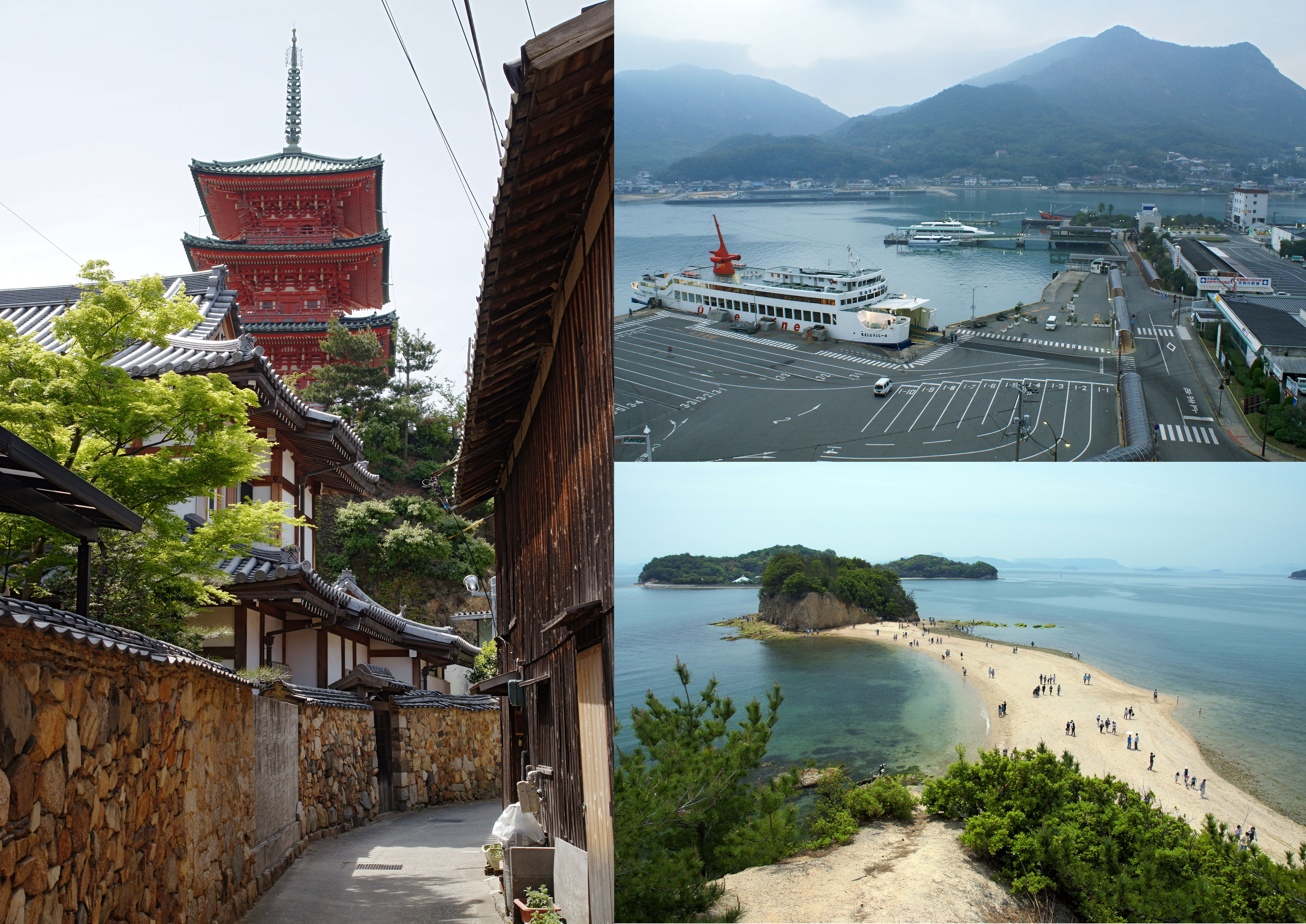
- Clockwise from left: historic town center, port of Tonoshō, Angel Road

- Flag Seal

- Location of Tonoshō (■) in Kagawa Prefecture

- Location in Japan
- Coordinates: 34°29′N 134°11′E
- Country: Japan
- Region: Shikoku
- Prefecture: Kagawa Prefecture
- District: Shōzu

Government
  - Mayor: Yoshiyuki Okano

Area
  - Total: 74.38 km^{2} (28.72 sq mi)

Population (2020)
  - Total: 12,915
  - Density: 173.6/km^{2} (449.7/sq mi)
- Time zone: UTC+09:00 (JST)
- City hall address: 559-2 Kō, Tonoshō-chō, Shōzu-gun, Kagawa-ken; 761-4192
- Website: www.town.tonosho.kagawa.jp (Japanese)
- Symbols
- Flower: Azalea
- Mascot: Olive Shimachan
- Tree: Ubame oak (Quercus phillyraeoides)

Tonoshō (土庄町, Tonoshō-chō) is a town and port in Shōzu District, Kagawa, Japan, with a population of 12,915. The town lies on the west coast of the island of Shōdoshima—the second-largest island in the Seto Inland Sea—and it is the main passenger access for the island. First settled around the 8th century, the town center grew into a complex maze of streets during the war-torn Muromachi period (1336–1573) to inhibit enemy forces. The town was officially incorporated in 1898, and today sesame oil, olives, sōmen noodles, fishing and tourism are important industries.

The town's jurisdiction totals 74.38 km^{2}, covering historic Tonoshō and smaller settlements on western Shōdoshima, as well as Teshima, Odeshima, and other nearby islands.

The town is known as the setting of the manga and anime Teasing Master Takagi-san and is the creator's hometown. Tonoshō also participates in the regional Setouchi Triennale art festival, and several art installations are found in the area.

== Demographics ==
Per Japanese census data, the population of Tonoshō has roughly halved over the past half-century.

Historical population
Year	Pop.	±%
1970	22,037	—
1980	21,398	−2.9%
1990	20,191	−5.6%
2000	17,711	−12.3%
2010	15,123	−14.6%
2020	12,846	−15.1%

== Notable locations ==
Modern Tonoshō includes all of western Shodoshima, Teshima, and surrounding islands.

- Angel Road, a 500-meter-long sandbar that appears during low tide, connecting Shodoshima with a series of small islets
- Chōshi Gorge
- Dofuchi Strait, the narrowest strait in the world
- Teshima, a large island to the west

== Notable people ==
- Sōichirō Yamamoto, a Japanese manga artist and the creator of Teasing Master Takagi-san

== Gallery ==
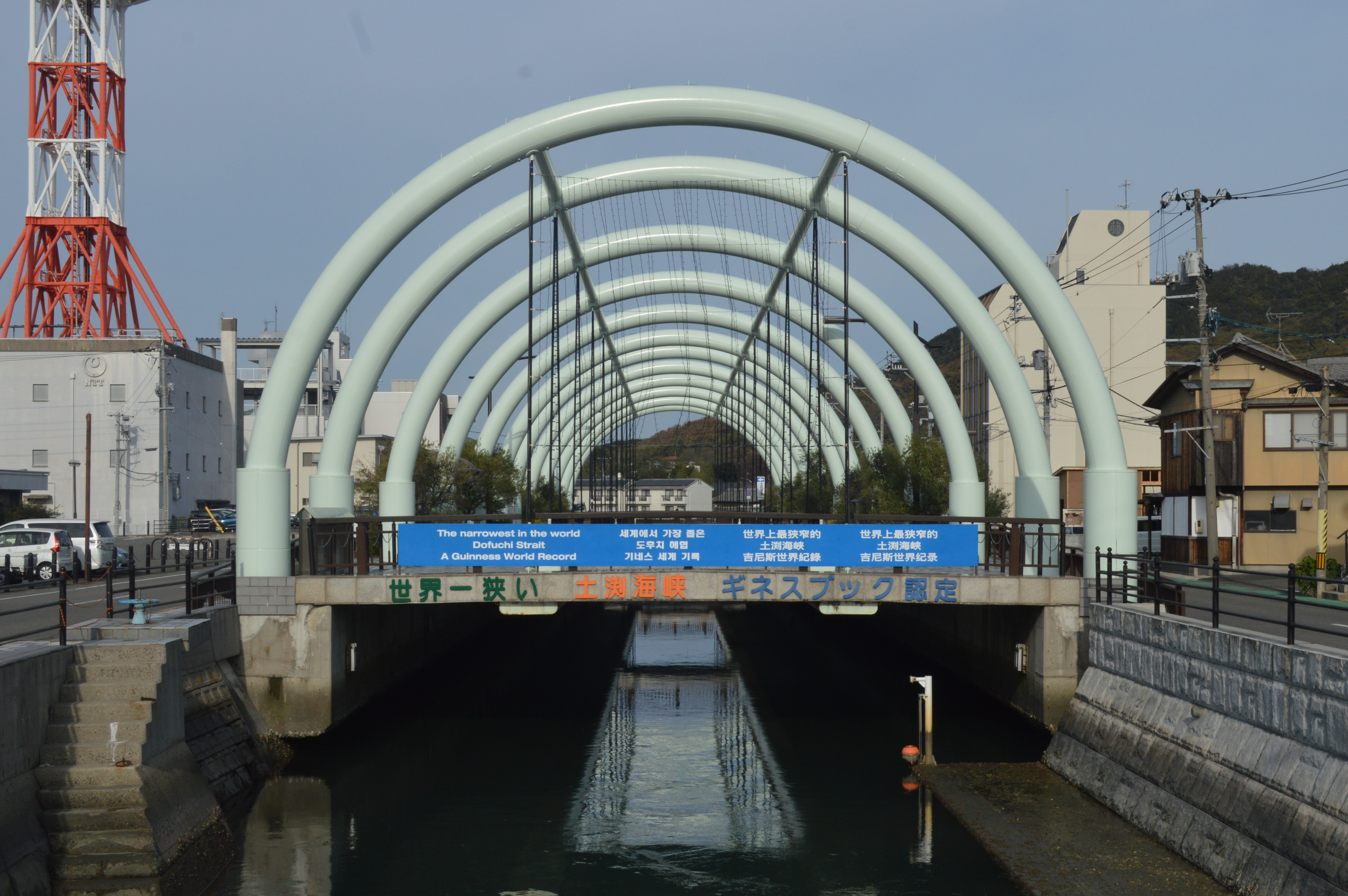
Dofuchi Strait

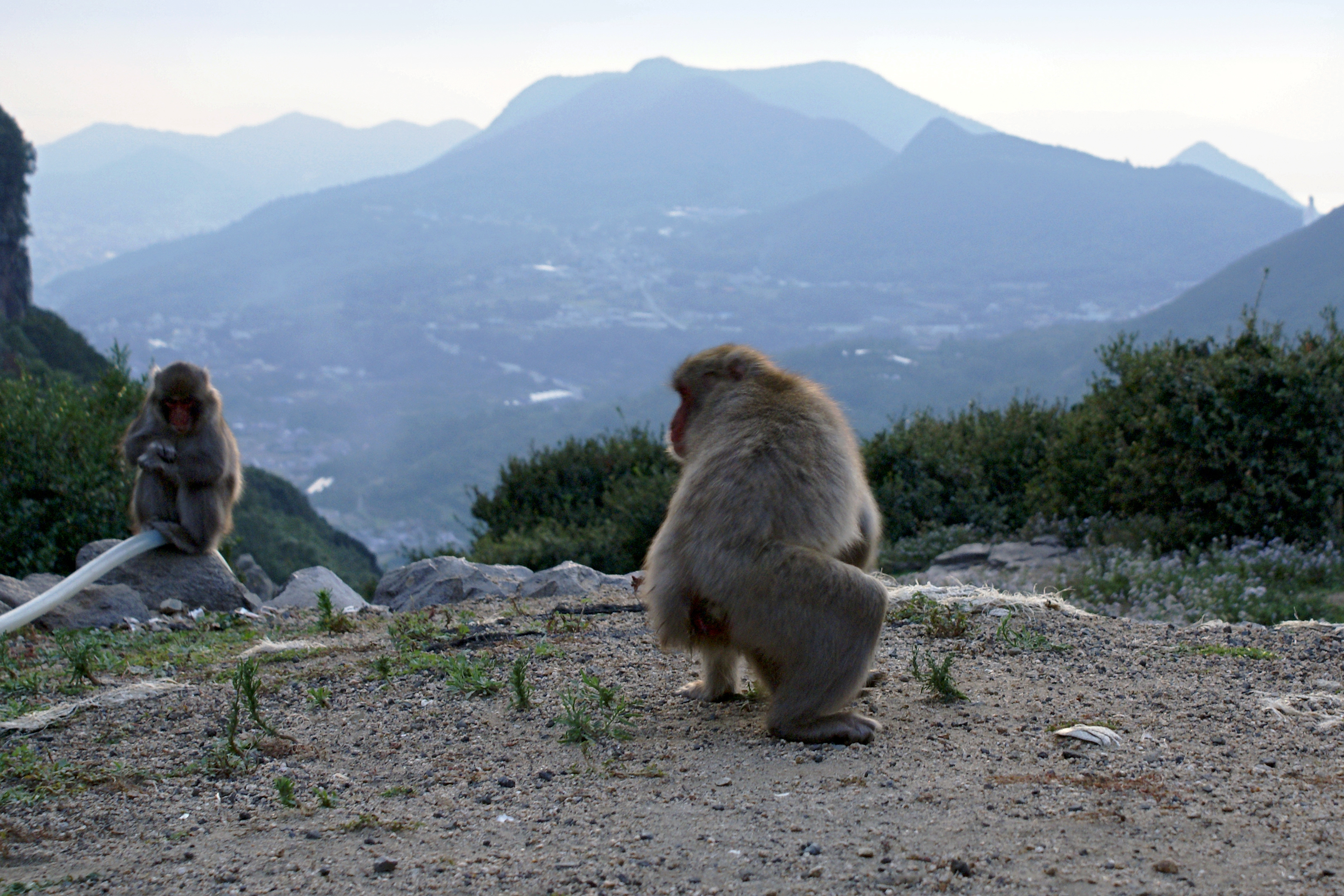
Monkeys at Chōshi Gorge

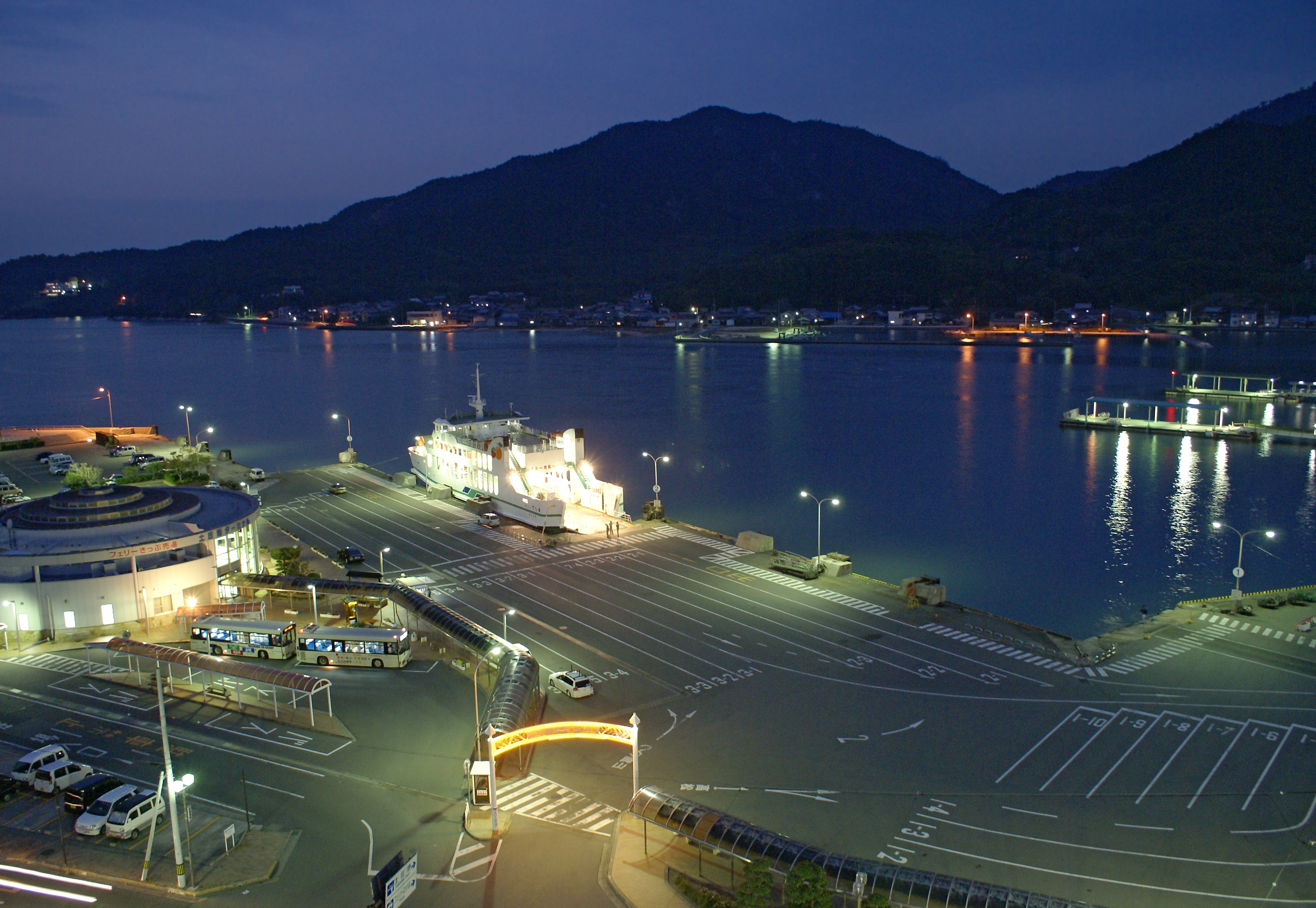
Port of Tonoshō at night
