= Robert Epp =

American translator (1926–2019)

Robert Charles Epp (December 15, 1926 – May 16, 2019) was an American translator of Japanese literature into English. Among others, he translated the poetry of Hagiwara Sakutarō, Maruyama Kaoru, Tachihara Michizō, and Daisaku Ikeda.

== Life and career ==
Robert Charles Epp was born in Elmhurst, Illinois on December 15, 1926. During World War II, Epp served in the U.S. Marine Corps, before being discharged in August 1945. An A.M. and Ph.D. of Harvard University, he was latterly a Professor Emeritus at UCLA.

He shared the first Japan-United States Friendship Commission's Friendship Fund Prize for Japanese Literary Translation of the poetry of Kinoshita Yūji (1979).

Epp died on May 16, 2019, at the age of 92.

== Books translations and poet studies ==
- 1972——“Chapbook: The Poetry of Maruyama Kaoru.” The Beloit Poetry Journal, 48 pages.
- 1972——Daisaku Ikeda, The People. Selected verse, 51 pages.
- 1973——Daisaku Ikeda, Yesterday, Today and Tomorrow, Essays, 228 pages.
- 1976——Daisaku Ikeda, Advice to Young People. Essays, 176 pages.
- 1976——Daisaku Ikeda, Hopes and Dreams. Selected verse, 70 pages.
- 1980——Daisaku Ikeda, My Recollections. Essays, 145 pages.
- 1982.05——Treelike: The Poetry of Kinoshita Yūji. With facing Japanese originals, xv–xxx + 272 pages.
- 1982.08——Kinoshita Yūji — A Study of the Poet, Twayne, vii + 145 pages.
- 1988.02——Ozaki Kazuo, Rosy Glasses. Ten short stories, 150 pages.
- 1990.09——Self–Righting Lamp: Selected Poetry of Maruyama Kaoru, 125 pages.
- 1991——Tsubota Jōji, Children in the Wind. Children’s novella, 89 pages.
- 1993.07——Egg in my Palm: Selected Poetry of Tsuboi Shigeji. 290 works 278 pages.
- 1993.11——Twisted Memories: Collected Poetry of Kinoshita Yūji. 360 works, 280 pages.
- 1994.04——That Far-Off Self: Collected Poetry of Maruyama Kaoru, 2nd edition. 460 works, 368 pages.
- 1994.10——Rainbows: Selected Poetry of Horiguchi Daigaku. 565 works, 360 pages.
- 1995.08——Cinderellas: Selected Poetry of Sekine Hiroshi. 198 works, 335 pages.
- 1996.07——Long Corridor: Selected Poetry of Mushakōji Saneatsu. 465 works, 398 pages.
- 1997.11——Threading the Maze, Selected Verse of Seven Modern Japanese Poets, 630 works, 383 pages.
- 1999.04——Rats’ Nests: Collected Poetry of Hagiwara Sakutarō, 2nd edition; 470 works, 445 pages.
- 2002.01——Of Dawn, of Dusk, Selected Poetry of Tachihara Michizō, with Iida Gakuji; 190 works, 464 pages.
- 2005.02——His Psychic Spoor—150 Annotated Poems of Hagiwara Sakutarō, with Iida Gakuji; 384 pages.

== Articles and tidbits ==
- 1967.22:1–2——“Attempts to Compile a Civil Code in Japan, 1866–78.” Monumenta Nipponica, pages 15–48.
- 1967.09——“China’s Cultural Revolution in Perspective: The Red Guard Phase.” The Cresset [hereafter, TC; issued by Valparaiso University], pages 8–16.
- 1969: Spring——“Response to Individualism by Mid–Meiji and Postwar [Japanese] Intellectuals.” Japan Christian Quarterly [hereafter, JCQ], pages 71–95.
- 1969–70——“Understanding the Seventies.” The Japan Christian Yearbook, 1969–1970, pages 63–97.
- 1970.01——“Student Protest in Japan: Social and Institutional Factors.” TC, pages 6–11.
- 1970.04——“The U.S.–Japan Security Treaty Crisis.” Current History, pages 222–208, and 243. Reprinted, Spring 1972, by the U.S. Army War College.
- 1970.06——“National Security and the Japanese Radical.” TC, pages 6–11.
- 1970: Fall——“Proposals for Reading Improvement in Japanese.” JCQ, pages 276–278.
- 1972: Winter——“The Japanese Student in America.” JCQ, pages 31–36.
- 1973: Winter——“Images of Hope in the Poetry of Shigeji Tsuboi.” JCQ, pages 39–47.
- 1977: Winter——“Translations of Modern [Japanese] Poetry.” JCQ, pages 47–51.
- 1980: Summer——“Some Aspects of Daisaku Ikeda’s Thought.” JCQ, XLVI:3, pages 167–175. Reprinted in the Journal of the Institute of Oriental Philosophy (1985:X).
- 1980: Fall——“Shigeji Tsuboi: From Anarchist to Proletarian Poet.” JCQ, XLVI:4, pages 228–235.
- 1980: Winter——“Spontaneity: The Ideal Existence [on the poet Mushakōji Saneatsu].” JCQ, pages 46–50.
- 1981.04——“The Poetry of Kinoshita Yūji.” Journal Newsletter of the Association of Teachers of Japanese, pages 30–63.
- 1983: Fall——“The Barriers Within—Etō Shinpei and Ourselves.” JCQ, pages 141–148.
- 1985: Spring——“Creator in the Verse of Mushakōji Saneatsu.” JCQ, pages 92–95.
- 1988: Spring——“Images of Pain in the Early Poetry of Hagiwara Sakutarō.” JCQ, pages 148–162.
- 1989: Fall——“Two Views of God in the Early Poetry of Hagiwara Sakutarō.” JCQ, pages 217–227.
- 1994.04——“Ship of Reason: The Poetry of Maruyama Kaoru,” Shōwa shijinron [On Shōwa Poets]. Tokyo: Yūseidō, pages 189–204; Japanese translation, “Risei no fune” by Aizawa Shirō, pages 205–224.
- 2001.05——“Translating Tachihara Michizō” in Miyamoto Noriko, ed., Tachihara Michizō (Tokyo: Bessatsu • Special Issue of Kokubungaku kaishaku to kanshō • Interpreting and Appreciating Japanese Literature), pages 433–434.
- 2005.02——“Grief and Guilt—A Study of Hagiwara Sakutarō’s ‘Night Train’ (1913),” pages 157–177, in the Festschrift Confluences: Studies from East to West in Honor of V. H. Viglielmo (Honolulu: University of Hawaii Press, 2005), edited by N. Ochner and W. Ridgeway, 286 pages.
- 2015.09 —— "Hagiwara Sakutarô's Arcane 'Harmful Creatures"" (1913), pages 130-156, in "Salutations: a Festschrift for Burton Watson"(Tokyo: Ahadada/Ekleksographia, 2015), edited by Jesse Glass and Philip F. Wiliams.

== Translated articles and items ==
- 1966: Spring——Matsumoto Sannosuke, “Democracy and Nationalism in Postwar Japanese Thought.” Introduction to the issue, Journal of Social and Political Ideas in Japan [hereafter, JSPIJ], pages 2–19.
- 1966: Spring——________, “The Vietnam War and Japan’s Security.” JSPIJ, pages 20–23.
- 1966: Spring——________, “The Structure of Conservative and Progressive Thought.” JSPIJ, pages 60–62.
- 1966: Spring——Itō M., “Structural Analysis of Conservative and Progressive Forces in Japan.” JSPIJ, pages 85–93.
- 1966: Spring——Noguchi Yūichirō, “Economic Nationalism.” JSPIJ, pages 94–99.
- 1966: Spring——Miyamoto Ken’ichi, “Grass–roots Conservatism.” JSPIJ, pages 100–106.
- 1966: Fall——Tokuda Noriyuki, “Chinese Foreign Policy.” JSPIJ, pages 11–13.
- 1966: Fall——________, “China and Japan.” JSPIJ, pages 49–50.
- 1967: Spring——Soma Masao, “The Roots of Political Corruption.” JSPIJ, pages 1–10.
- 1967: Spring——Noguchi Yūichirō, “Trends in Thought Among Structural Reformists in Japanese Industry.” JSPIJ, pages 11–26.
- 1967: Spring——Nagai Yōnosuke, “Japanese Foreign Policy in a Nuclear Milieu.” JSPIJ, pages 27–42.
- 1967: Spring——Seki Hiroharu, “Systems of Power Balance and the Preservation of Peace.” JSPIJ, pages 43–65.
- 1967: Spring——Nomura Kōichi, “Mao Tse–tung’s Thought and the Chinese Revolution.” JSPIJ, pages 67–90.
- 1967: Spring——Kikuchi Masanori, “Cultural Revolution in China and the Soviet Union: Two Views of Class Struggle.” JSPIJ, pages 91–100 (co–translation with Kano Tsutomu).
- 1967: Spring——Miyamoto Ken’ichi, “Rejoinder to Professor Steiner.” JSPIJ, 105–107.
- 1968: Fall——Sumiya Mikio, “The Function and Social Structure of Education: Schools and Japanese Society.” JSPIJ, 117–131.
- 1968: Fall——Mita Munesuke, “Patterns of Alienation in Contemporary Japan.” JSPIJ, pages 139–171.
- 1968: Fall——Etō Jun, “The Japanese University: Myths and Ideals.” JSPIJ, pages 179–189.
- 1968: Fall——Orihara H., “‘Test Hell’ and Alienation: Study of Tokyo University Freshmen.” JSPIJ, pages 225–245.
- 1968: Fall——Ōno Tsutomu, “Student Protest in Japan—What it Means to Society.” JSPIJ, pages 251–270.
- 1968: Fall——Matsumoto Sannosuke, “Rejoinder to Professor Harootunian.” JSPIJ, 322–325.
- 1968: Fall——________, “Rejoinder to Professor Craig.” JSPIJ, pages 327–329.
- 1968: Fall——Nomura Kōichi, “Rejoinder to Professors Levenson and McColl.” JSPIJ, pages 342–344.
- 1970: Spring——Takeuchi Yoshirō, “The Great Cultural Revolution and Modern Marxism.” JSPIJ, pages 45–69.
- 1970: Spring——Fujita Shōzō, “The Spirit of the Meiji Revolution.” JSPIJ, 70–97.
- 1972: Fall——Sono Ayako, “Drifting in Space.” JCQ, pages 206–215.
- 1973: Fall——Shiina Rinzō, “Dostoyevsky and I” and “On Suicide.” JCQ, pages 220–230.
