= Shōzu District, Kagawa =

District in Kagawa Prefecture, Japan

Coordinates: 34.508°N 134.269°E

Location of Shōzu District in Kagawa Prefecture

Shōzu (小豆郡, Shōzu-gun) is a district in Kagawa Prefecture, Japan that covers the towns of Shōdoshima and Tonoshō. The district includes the islands of Shōdoshima, Teshima, and nearby small islands in the Seto Inland Sea.

As of 2020, the district has an estimated population of 34,714. The total area is 169.97 km^{2}, most of which is on the island of Shōdoshima.

== Towns and villages ==
- Shōdoshima
- Tonoshō

== Mergers ==
- On March 21, 2006 the towns of Ikeda and Uchinomi merged to form the new town of Shōdoshima.
