= Shōdoshima Olive Park =

Park in Japan

- 小豆島オリーブ公園
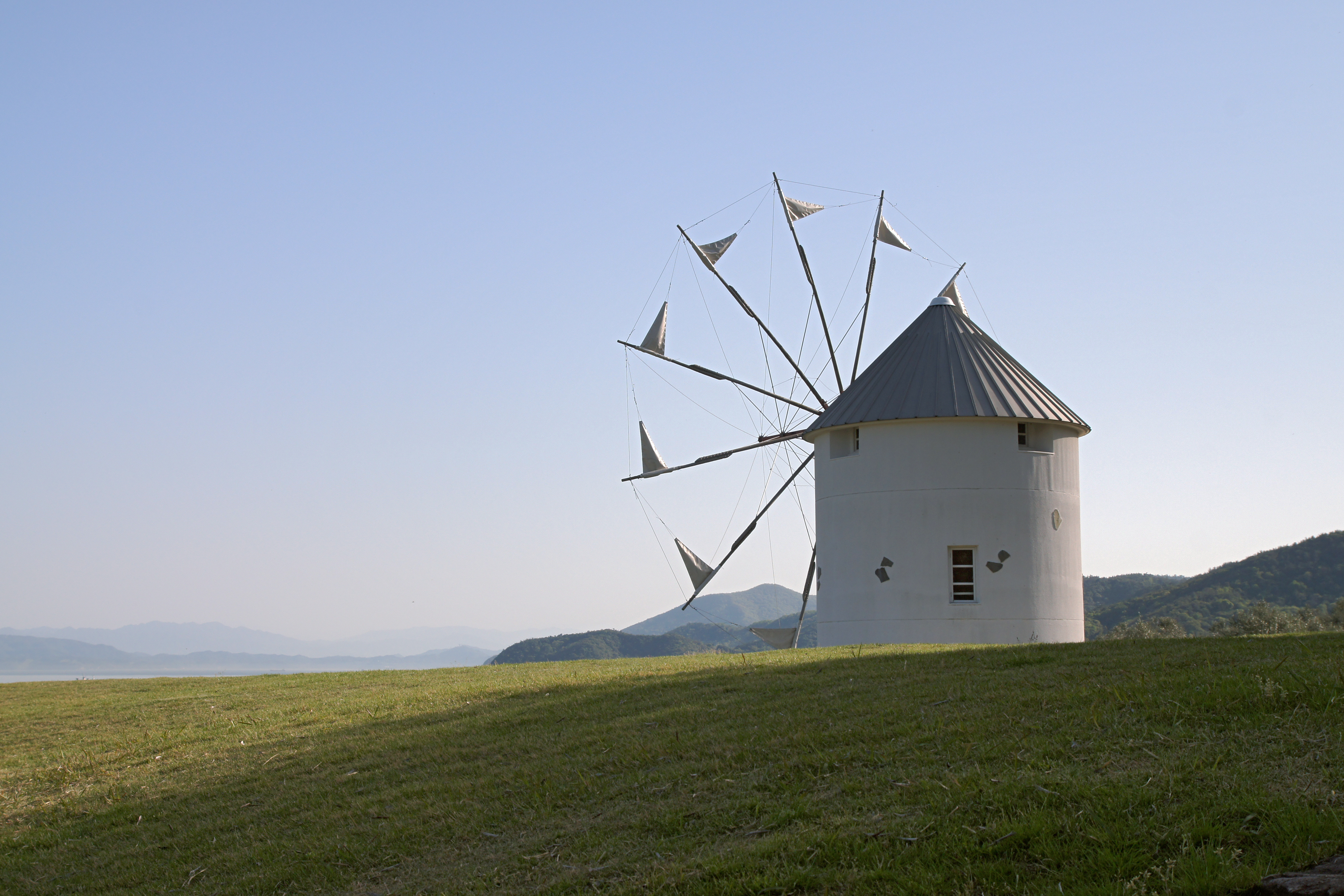
- Greek-style windmill in the park
- Interactive map of Shōdoshima Olive Park
- Type: Park
- Location: Shōdoshima, Kagawa Prefecture, Japan
- Coordinates: 34°28′21″N 134°16′27″E
- Website: www.olive-pk.jp/en/index.html

Shōdoshima Olive Park (小豆島オリーブ公園) is a park and public attraction themed around olives in Shōdoshima, Kagawa, Japan. The choice of theming the park around olives comes from Shōdoshima being the first area in Japan to successfully cultivate the fruit in the early 20th century when the Ministry of Agriculture, Forestry and Fisheries experimented with growing locations.

== Attractions ==
The park contains a variety of attractions spread throughout gardens and olive trees, including shops, restaurants, a Greek-style windmill, and a museum. The Greek windmill is one of the most iconic features of Shōdoshima Olive Park. The windmill was built in 1992 as a symbol of friendship with the Greek island of Milos, a sister island of Shōdoshima. Taking photos while jumping on a broomstick is a popular trend in front of the windmill, as the area partly inspired the Studio Ghibli film, Kiki's Delivery Service, a story about a witch.
