= Shigeji Tsuboi =

Japanese writer (1897–1975)

Shigeji Tsuboi 壺井繁治
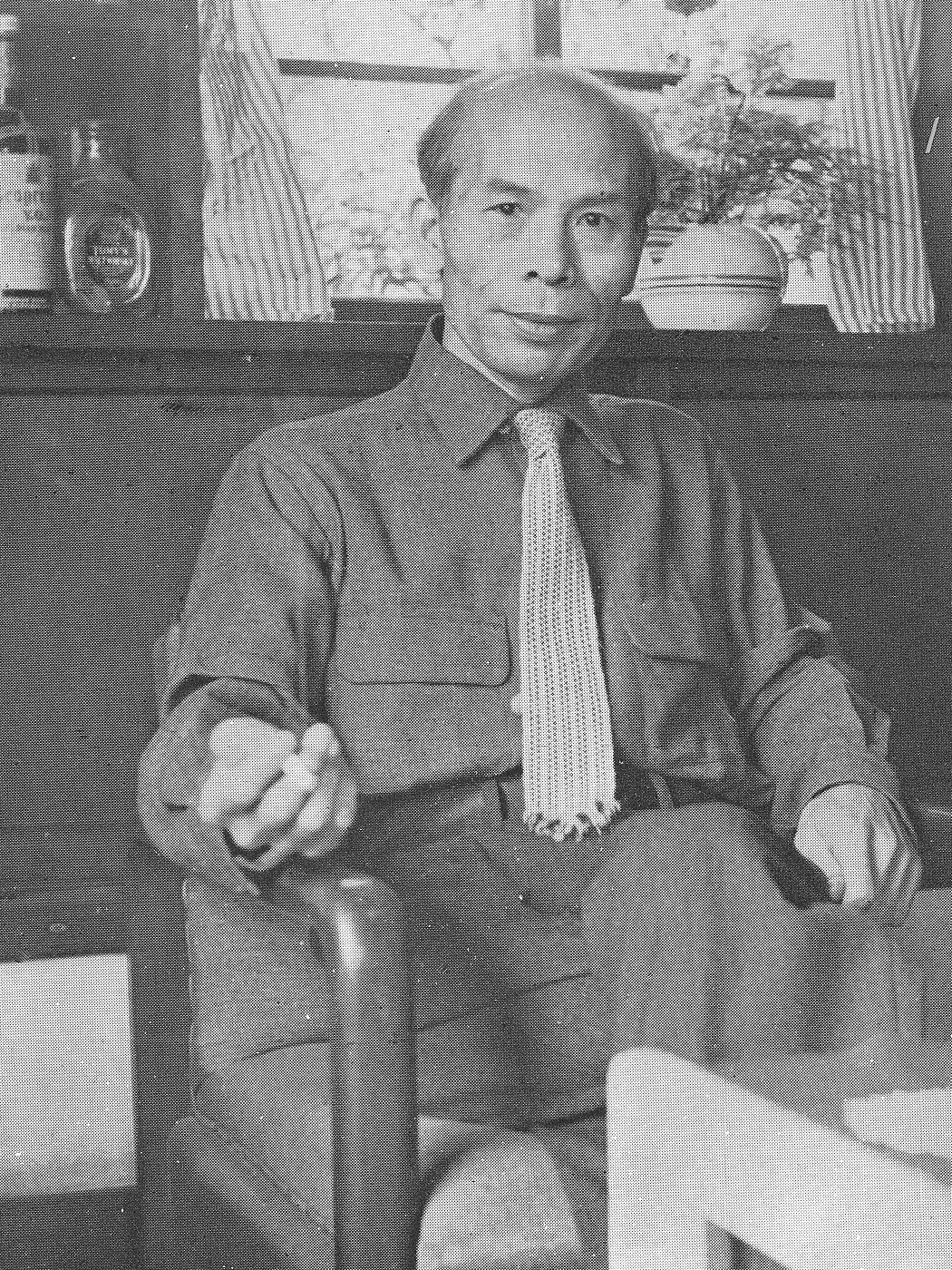
- Born: October 18, 1897; Shōdoshima, Kagawa
- Died: September 4, 1975 (aged 77); Nakano, Tokyo
- Resting place: Kodaira Cemetery
- Education: Waseda University
- Movement: Surrealism, dada
- Spouse: Sakae Tsuboi

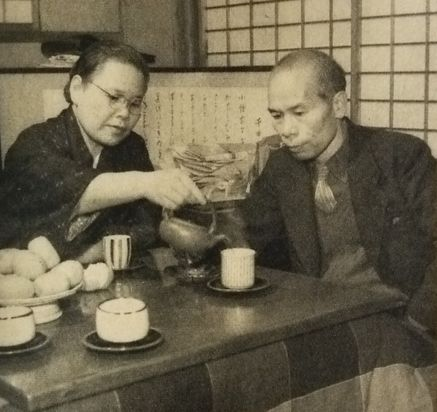
Tsuboi Sakae and Shigeji

Shigeji Tsuboi (壺井繁治, Tsuboi Shigeji; October 18, 1897 – September 4, 1975) was an influential Japanese poet of the modern era of Japanese literature. He was cofounder (with Hagiwara Kyojiro) of the Dadaist-Anarchist poetry journal Aka tokuro (Red and Black, 1923–24) and Bungei Kaiho (Literary liberation, 1927).

== History ==
Tsuboi was born on the island of Shōdoshima and studied briefly at Waseda University in Tokyo, but he never graduated. He started as a modernist and anarchist, but as Marxism grew stronger in Japan, he broke up with the anarchists (which cost him a broken arm) and started to work for the proletarian movement, writing short political prose pieces and being an active organizer. He was imprisoned twice; for the second time he was imprisoned with other left-wing writers and tortured until he renounced his right to publish anti-government works. This action of the government was intended to discredit the whole movement. He went home to recuperate from his ill treatment in prison. Later, Tsuboi returned from the country in despair, feeling as a traitor (he wrote about it in his poems Self-portrait, Mask, and Criminal). He spent the whole war in Tokyo, inactive apart from forming Sancho kurabu (Sancho Panza Club), writing short humorous prose pieces with hidden anti-war messages. After the war, he helped to form two magazines, Shin nihon bungaku (New Japanese literature) and Gendai shi (Contemporary poetry) and wrote one of his most popular collections of poetry, Fusen (Air-balloon, 1957). In 1962, he joined a half dozen other left-wing writers to found the journal Shijin kaigi [Poets' Conference], dedicated to helping workers, male and female, express their dissatisfactions about the status quo.

His wife was the popular Japanese novelist Sakae Tsuboi (壺井 栄, Tsuboi Sakae).

Tsuboi's poetry includes influences from traditional Japanese forms like haiku to European movements such as anarchism, Marxism, dada and surrealism.

== Works ==
- Egg in my Palm: Selected Poetry of Tsuboi Shigeji. Translated and compiled by Robert Epp. Stanwood, WA: Yakusha, 1993, 278 pages.
