= Shōdoshima =

Island in Seto Inland Sea, Japan

Native name: 小豆島
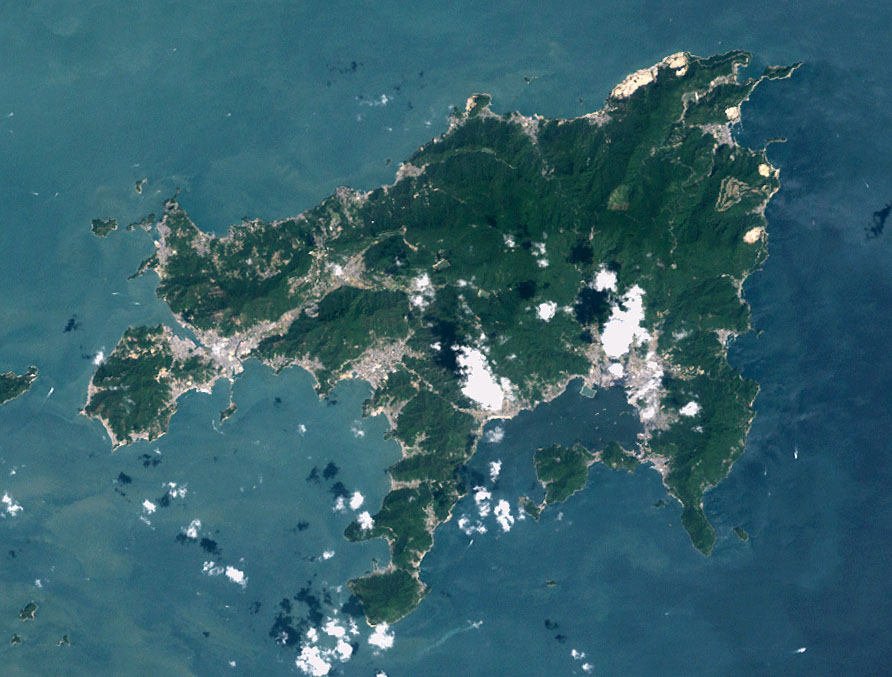

- Location within Japan

Geography
- Location: Seto Inland Sea, Japan
- Coordinates: 34°30′49″N 134°17′08″E
- Area: 153.30 km^{2} (59.19 sq mi)

Administration
- Japan
- Prefecture: Kagawa Prefecture
- District: Shōzu District

Shōdoshima or Shōdo Island (小豆島, Shōdoshima) is an island located in the Inland Sea of Japan. The name means "Island of Small Beans". There are two towns on the island: Tonoshō and Shōdoshima, composing the district of Shōzu.

The island is famous as the setting for the novel Twenty-Four Eyes and its subsequent film adaptations and the manga Teasing Master Takagi-san and its adaptations. The island was the first area of Japan to successfully grow olives, and it is sometimes known as "Olive Island".

== Geography ==
Olive Shima-chan, the island's mascot

Shōdoshima is part of Kagawa Prefecture and is located north of the prefectural capital Takamatsu. It has an area of 153.30 km^{2} (59.19 sq mi) and a coastline of 126 km (78 mi). It is the 23rd largest island in Japan, and the second largest in the Seto Inland Sea.

Shōdoshima is home to Dofuchi Strait, the world's narrowest strait, 9.93 m (32.58 ft) meters at its narrowest.

Frequent ferries run to the island from Takamatsu, Himeji, Teshima and Okayama. Ferries run infrequently to Osaka and Kōbe as well.

== History ==
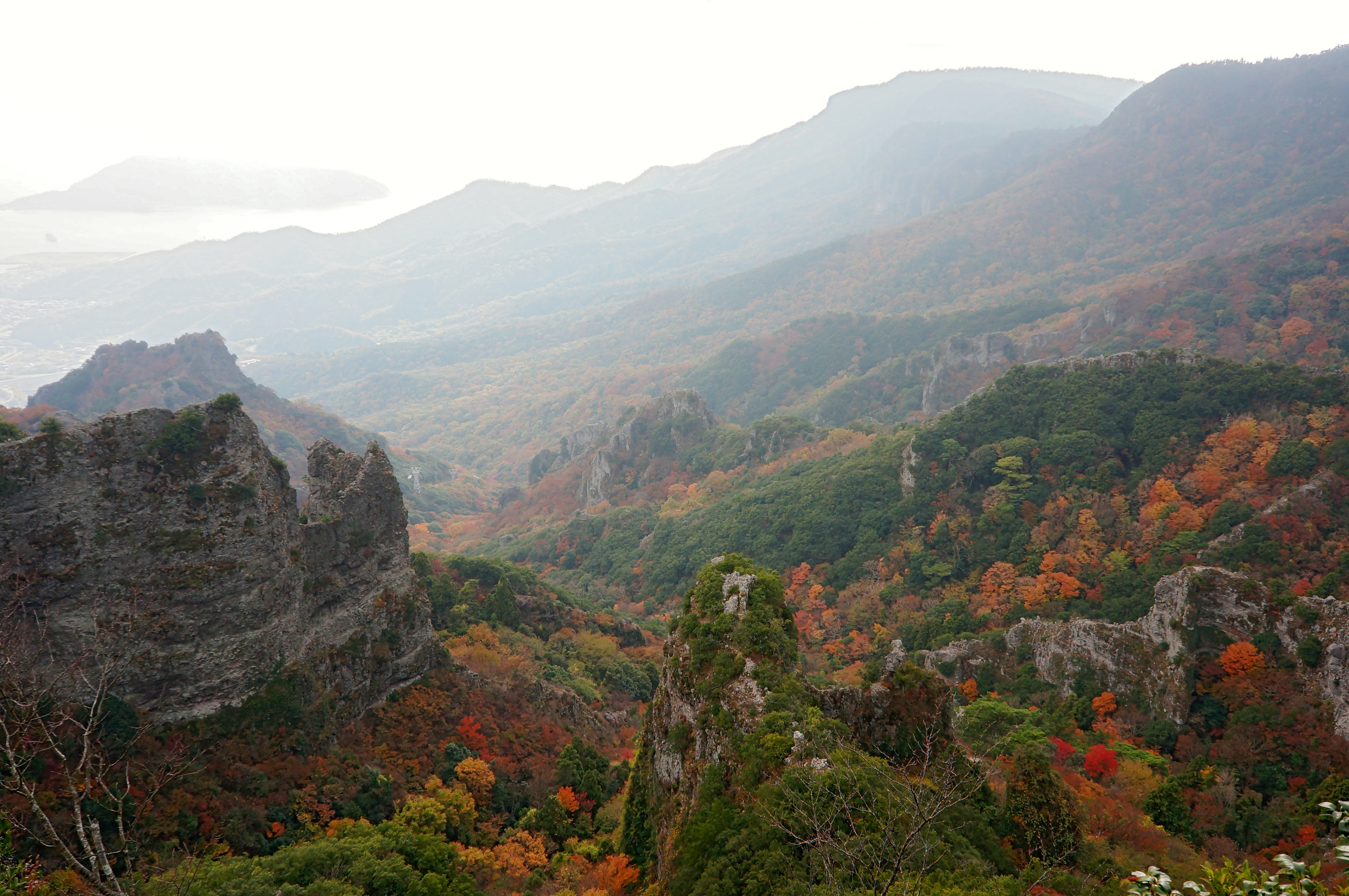
Kankakei

Shōdoshima was once known as Azuki-shima and was part of Kibi (later Bizen) Province, given to Sanuki Province, and finally made part of Kagawa prefecture.

== Tourism and culture ==
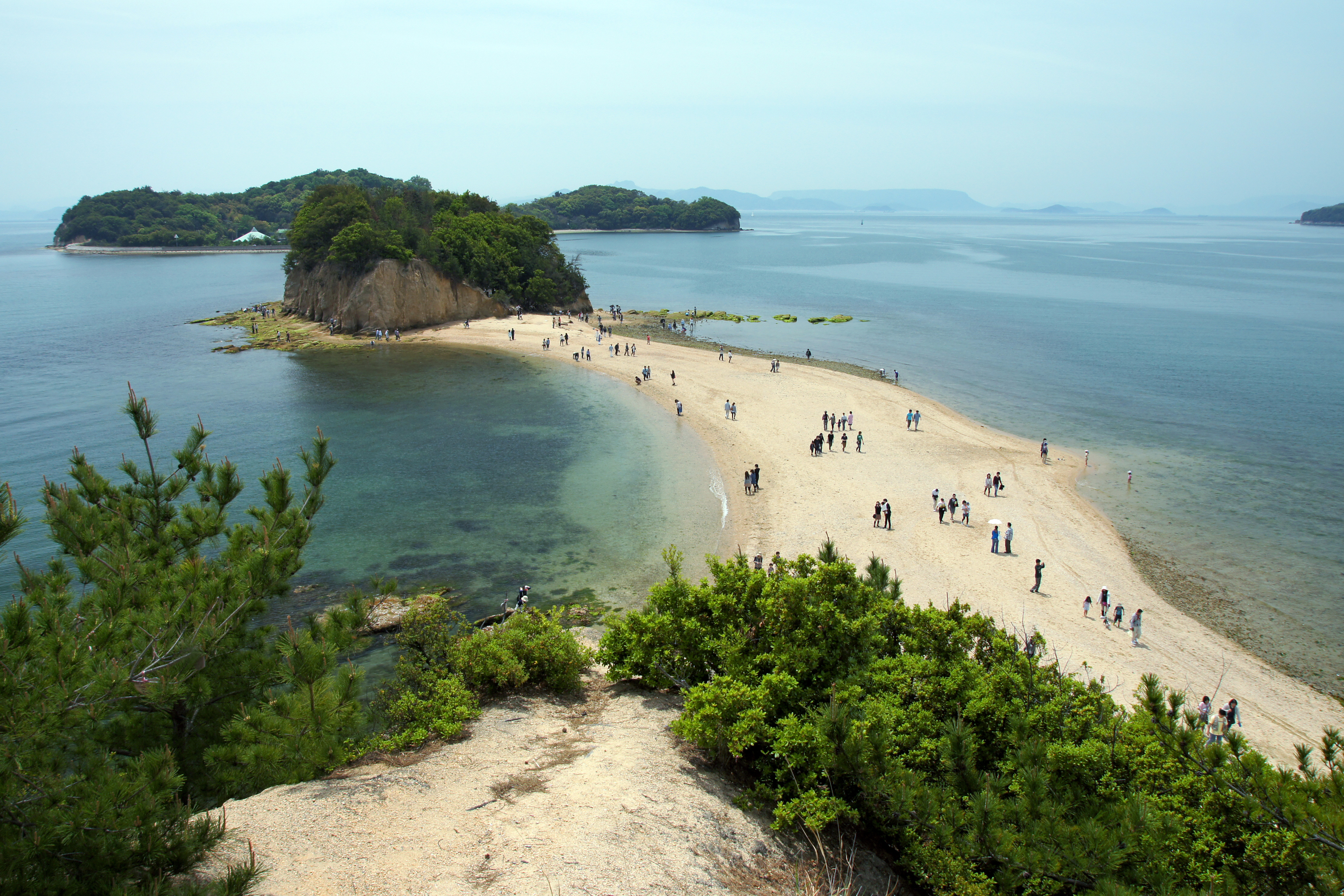
Angel Road connecting smaller islands to Shōdoshima at low tide

Shōdoshima is a popular destination for domestic tourism in Japan. In addition to natural features such as the Dobuchi Strait, the Angel Road, Shōdoshima Olive Park and the Kanka Gorge, Shōdoshima is famous as the setting for the antiwar novel Twenty-Four Eyes, written by the native author Sakae Tsuboi and later turned twice into a film (1954 and 1987), as well as a television special. The island is the birthplace of two other distinguished writers: Sakae's husband the poet Shigeji Tsuboi and the novelist and short-story writer Denji Kuroshima. All three were prominent participants in the proletarian literary movement, an important and politically radical current within modern Japanese literature.

Shōdoshima is also known for its olives, soy sauce, wild monkeys, and beaches. In addition, tourists are attracted to a miniature version of the 88-temple Shikoku Pilgrimage.

The island is also famous for being the first in Japan to successfully cultivate olives. Olive trees proliferate on the island and olive-related merchandise is quite popular with tourists. Milos, Greece, is Shōdoshima's sister island.

The island is the setting for the manga Teasing Master Takagi-san and its adaptations. Native creator Sōichirō Yamamoto was raised in Tonoshō Town.

The island's mascot is Olive Shima-chan (Japanese: オリーブしまちゃん), who is an olive-shaped prince whose task is to find secret spots of the island and to taste test olive oil for quality. He likes white rice. His birthday is on August 15. He is assisted by Mimozanoriku-chan and Rukkarukka.

- Olive King (Japanese: オリーブキング, romanized: Orībukingu) who has protected the island for 100 years, he is Olive Shima-chan's master. 15 March is his birthday.
- Mimozanoriku-chan (Japanese: ミモザのりくちゃん, romanized: Mimoza no riku-chan) is a mimosa. She is the girlfriend of Olive Shima-chan and is responsible for signalling the island's residents about the arrival of spring. Her birthday is March 8.
- Rukkarukka (Japanese: ルッカルッカ), is an olive who is a crybaby. His birthday is November 16.

The Shodoshima Olive Park is the recreation of the fictional Guchokipanya (lit. 'rock-scissors-paper') Bakery from the 2014 live-action adaptation of the novel Kiki's Delivery Service. The park was the preserved set of the said film. The park was reported to attracted nearly 300,000 visitors by 2023.

== Sister island ==
- Milos, Greece (1989)

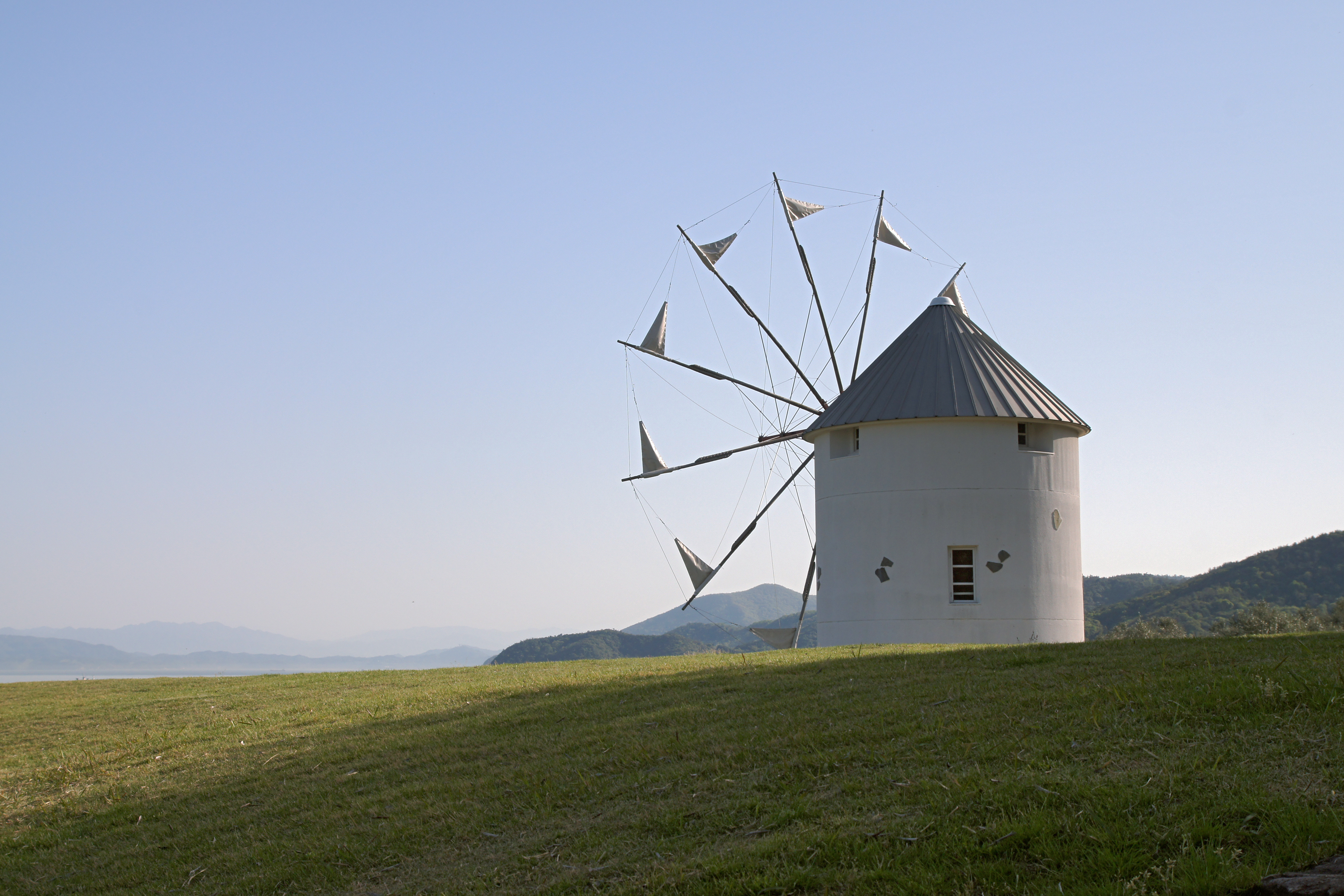
The windmill in Shodoshima Olive Park was presented to Shōdo Island by the Greek island of Milos.

== See also ==
- Kankakei Ropeway
- Olive Jinja
