= Kankakei =

Coordinates: 34°30′56″N 134°18′3″E

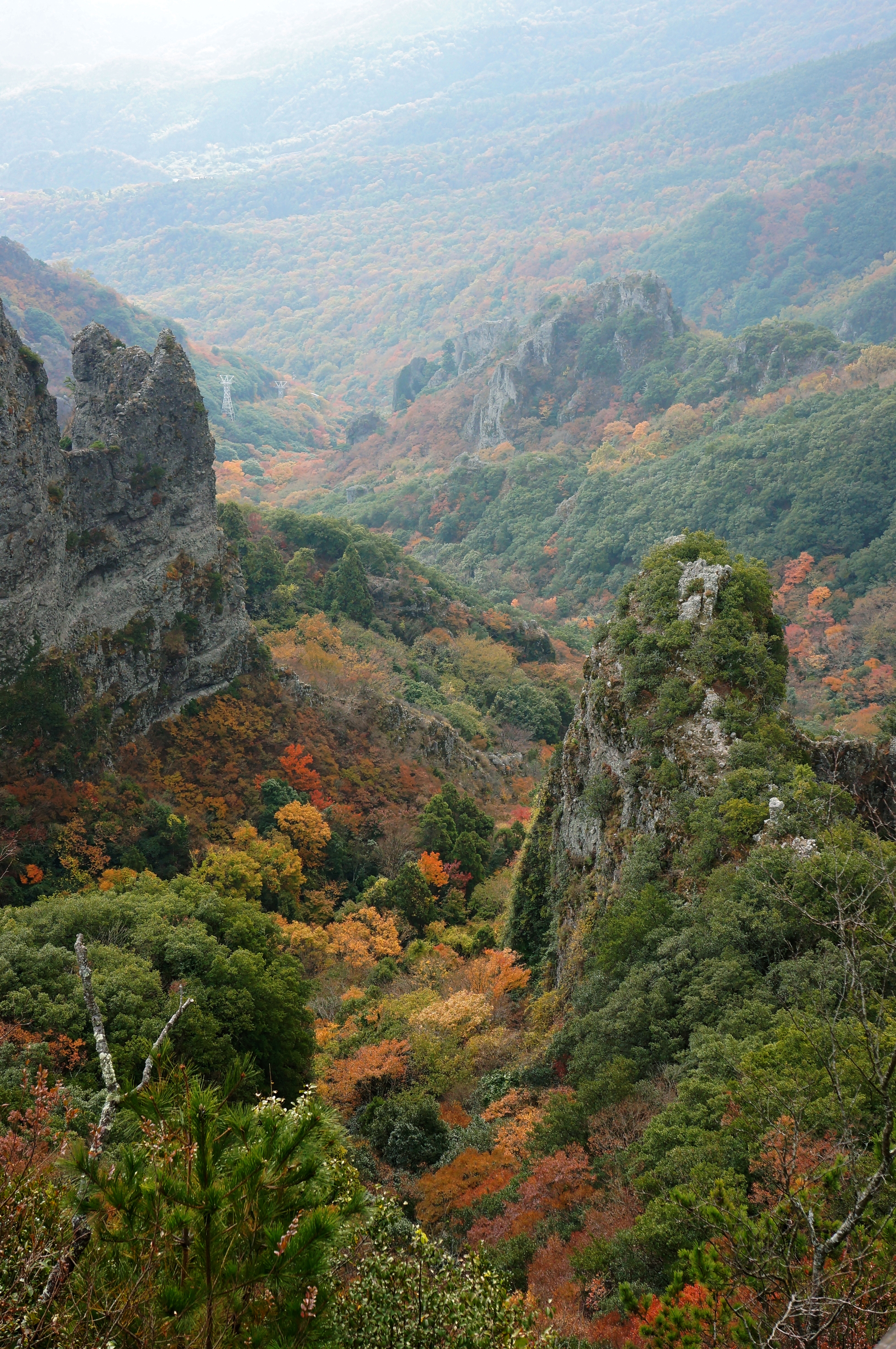
A view from near by Takatori observatory

The gorge of Kankakei (寒霞渓, Kanka-kei; literally 'cold mist valley') is a nationally designated Place of Scenic Beauty on the island of Shōdo-shima, Kagawa Prefecture, Japan. Part of the Setonaikai National Park, the heights rise to 812 m. The area is celebrated for its Japanese maple trees. Volunteers formed a preservation society in 1898 and when, in 1912, expropriation of the area was attempted, a soy sauce magnate stepped in to ensure its preservation. In 1927 Kankakei was selected as one of the 100 Landscapes of Japan.

== Landmarks ==
=== The Front Side 12 ===
1. Tsutenso
2. Kountei
3. Kinbyobu
4. Rosando
5. Senjogan
6. Gyokujunpo
7. Gachoseki
8. Soundan
9. Kayogaku
10. Eboshiiwa
11. Joraheki
12. Shibocho
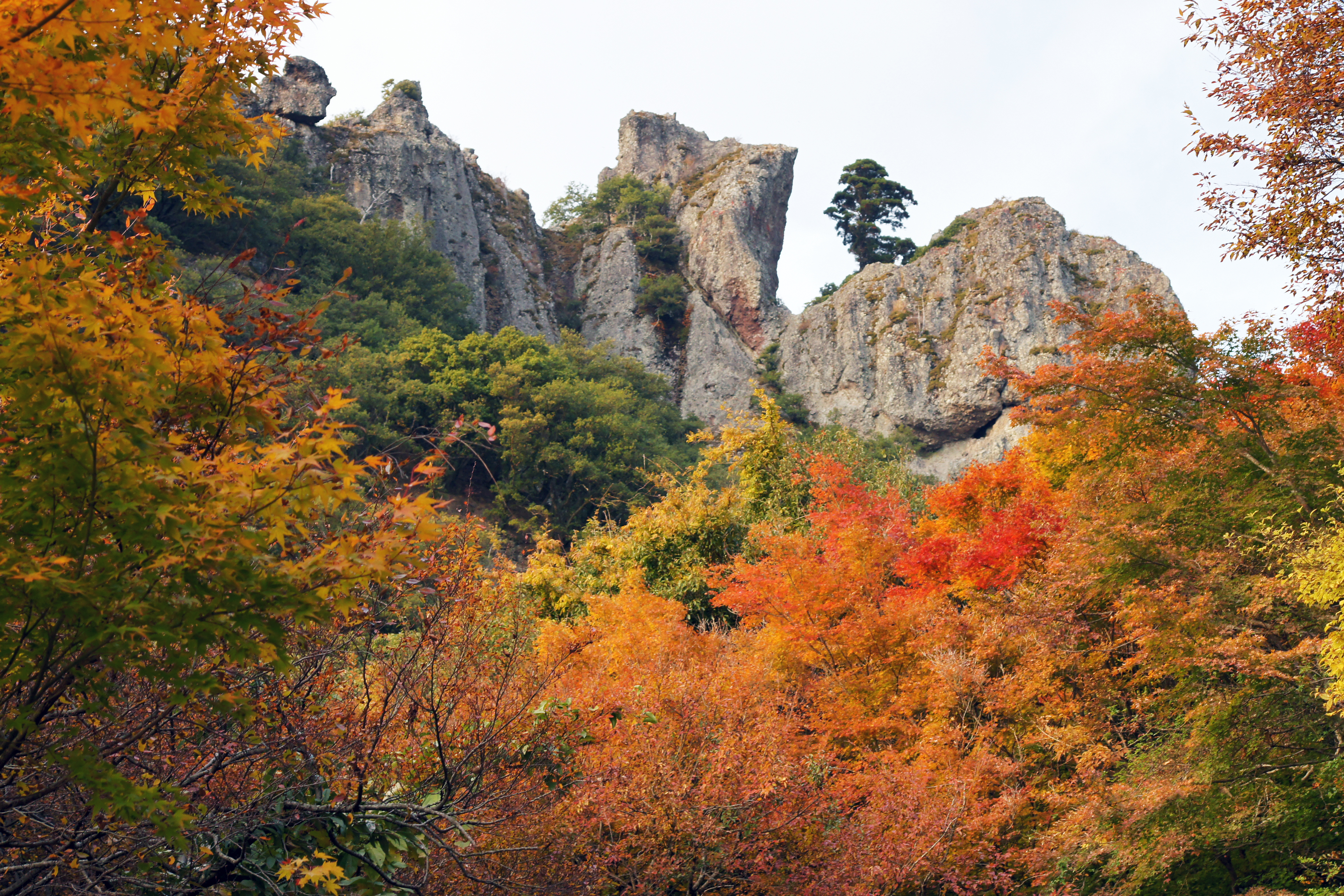
03. Kinbyobu

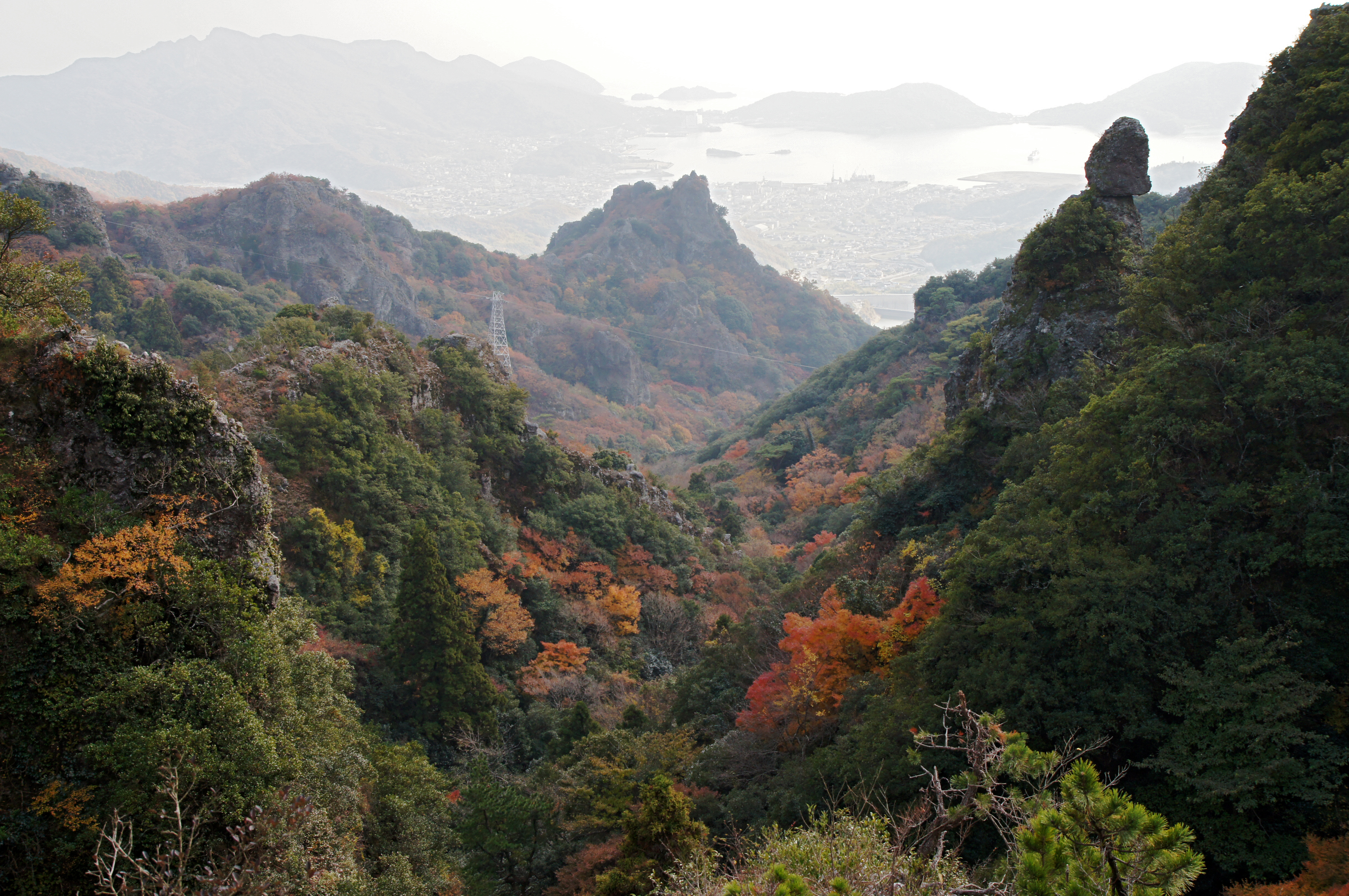
06. Gyokujunpo

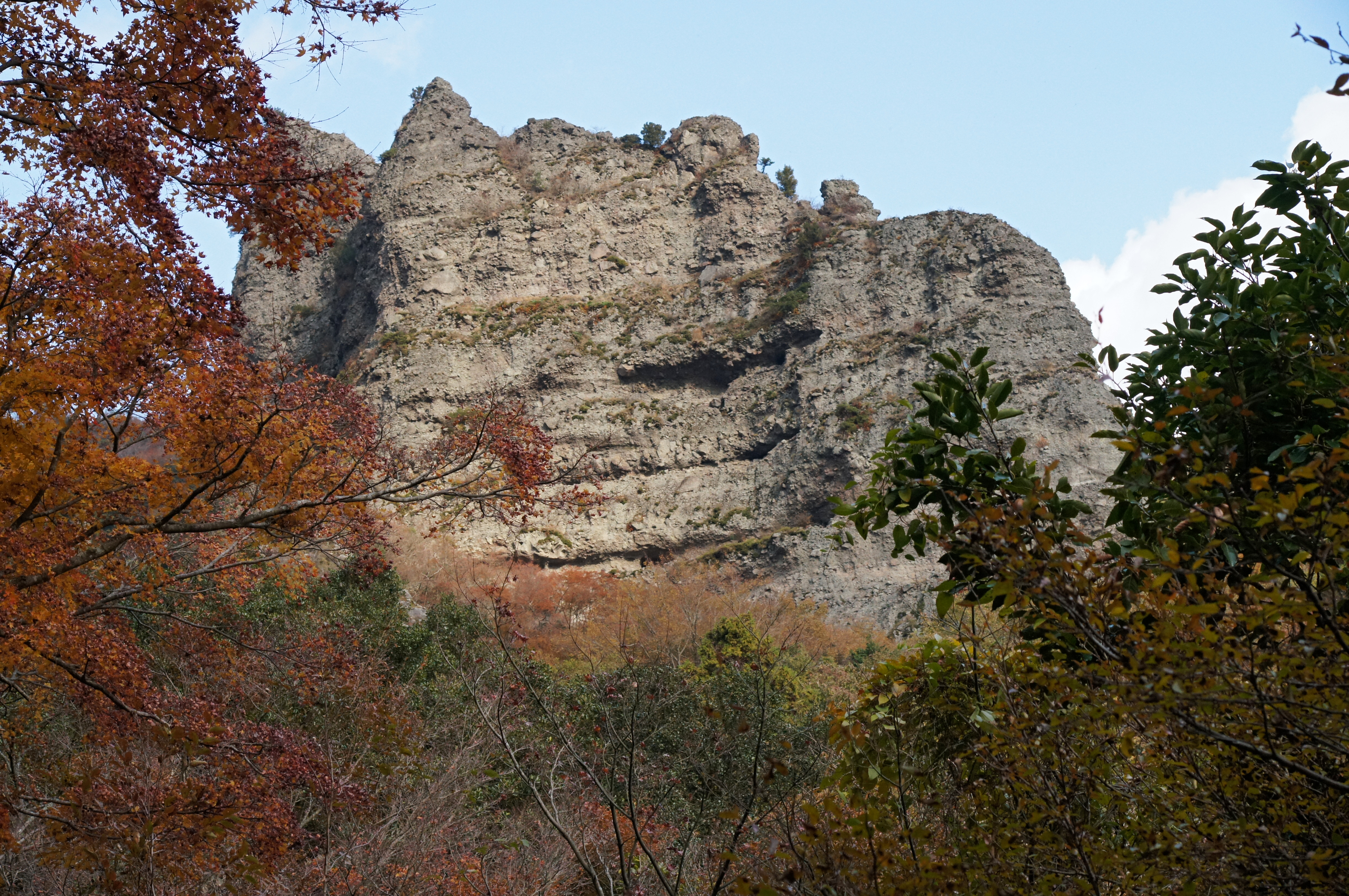
08. Soundan

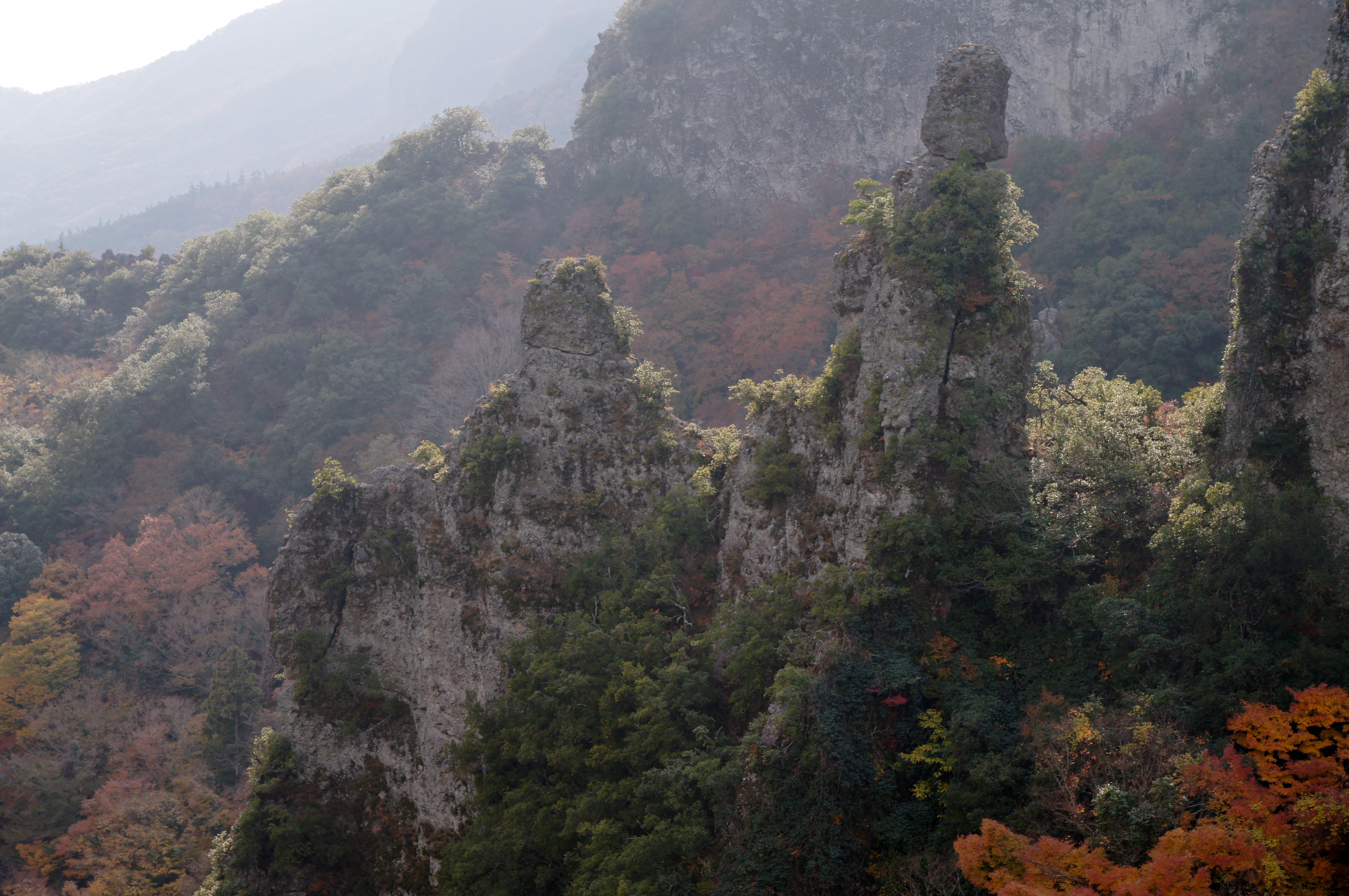
10. Eboshiiwa

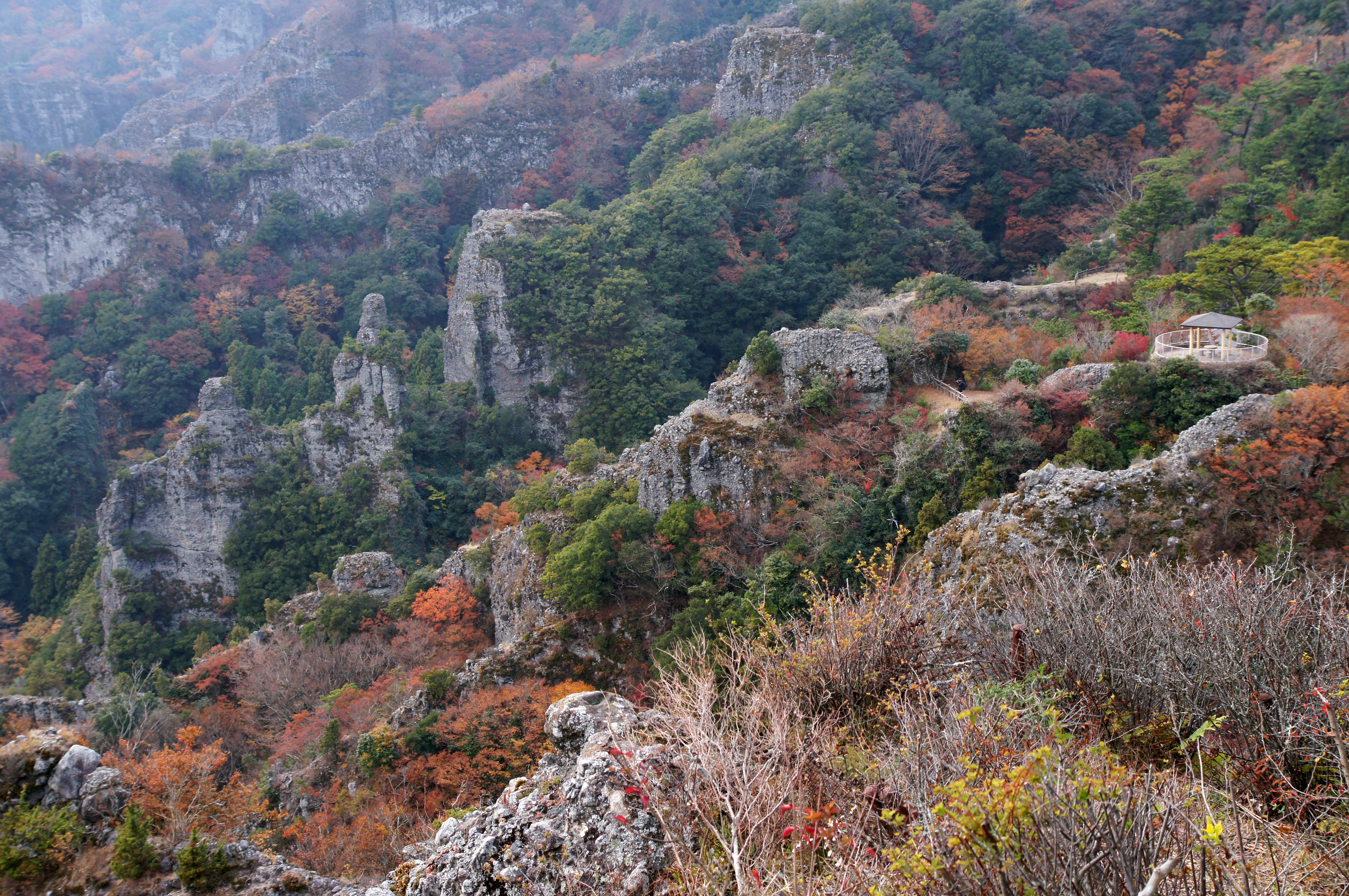
12. Shibocho

=== The Back Side 8 ===
1. Shikaiwa
2. Matsutakeiwa
3. Taishido
4. Noboritake
5. Taikigan
6. Futamiiwa
7. Horagaiwa
8. Sekimon

== See also ==
- Kankakei Ropeway
- Olive Jinja
- Setonaikai National Park
