= American poetry =

Poetry from the United States of America

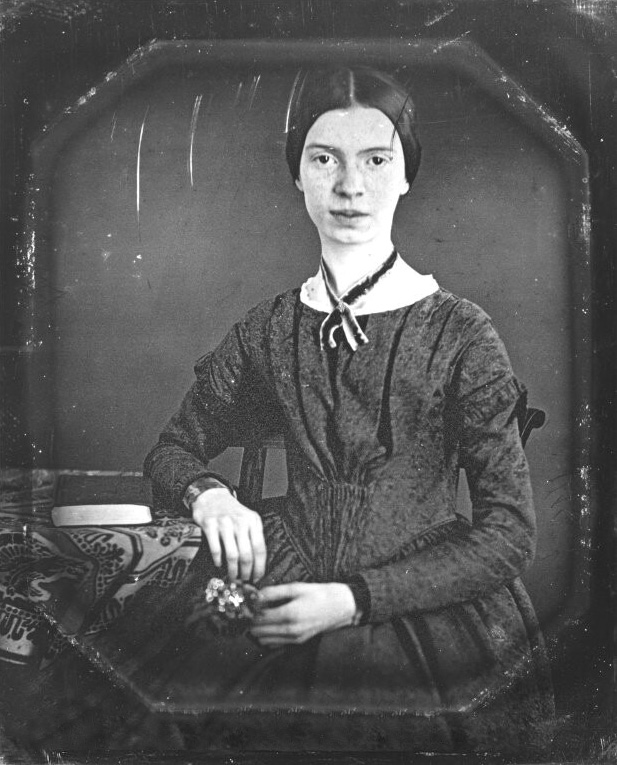
Emily Dickinson

American poetry refers to the poetry of the United States. It arose first as efforts by American colonists to add their voices to English poetry in the 17th century, well before the constitutional unification of the Thirteen Colonies (although a strong oral tradition often likened to poetry already existed among Native American societies). Most of the early colonists' work was similar to contemporary English models of poetic form, diction, and theme. However, in the 19th century, an American idiom began to emerge. By the later part of that century, poets like Walt Whitman were winning an enthusiastic audience abroad and had joined the English-language avant-garde.

Much of the American poetry published between 1910 and 1945 remains lost in the pages of small circulation political periodicals, particularly the ones on the far left, destroyed by librarians during the 1950s McCarthy era. Modernist poets like Ezra Pound and T.S. Eliot (who was awarded the Nobel Prize in Literature in 1948) are often cited as creative and influential English-language poets of the first half of the 20th century. African American and women poets were published and read widely in the same period but were often somewhat prejudicially marginalized. By the 1960s, the Beat Movement and Black Mountain poets had developed new models for poetry and their contemporaries influenced the British Poetry Revival. Towards the end of the millennium, consideration of American poetry had diversified, as scholars placed an increased emphasis on poetry by women, African Americans, Hispanics, Chicanos, Native Americans, and other ethnic groups. Louise Glück and Bob Dylan have been awarded the Nobel Prize in Literature.

== Poetry in the colonies ==
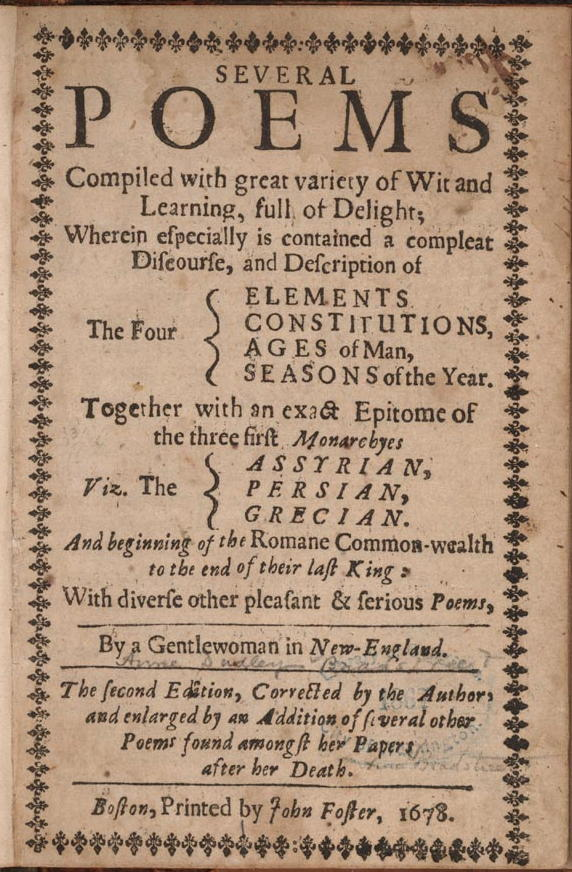
Title page of second (posthumous) edition of Anne Bradstreet's poems, 1678

As England's contact with the Americas increased after the 1490s, English explorers sometimes included verse with their descriptions of the New World up through 1650, the year of Anne Bradstreet's "The Tenth Muse", which was written in America (most likely in Ipswich, Massachusetts or North Andover, Massachusetts) and printed and distributed in London by her brother-in-law, Rev. John Woodbridge. There are 14 such writers who might be termed American poets (they had been to America and to different degrees, written poems or verses about the place). Early examples include a 1616 "testimonial poem" on the "sterling and warlike" character of Captain John Smith (in Barbour, ed. "Works") and Rev. William Morrell's 1625 "Nova Anglia" or "New England", which is a rhymed catalog of everything from American weather to his glimpses of Native American women. Then in May 1627, Thomas Morton of Merrymount – a Devon-born West Country outdoorsman, attorney at law, man of letters and colonial adventurer – raised a maypole to celebrate and foster success at his fur-trading settlement and nailed a "Poem" and "Song" (one a densely literary manifesto on how European and Native people came together there and must keep doing so for a successful America; the other a light "drinking song" also full of deeper American implications). These were published in book form along with other examples of Morton's American poetry in "New English Canaan" (1637); and based on the criteria of "First," "American" and "Poetry," they make Morton (and not Anne Bradstreet) America's first poet in English.

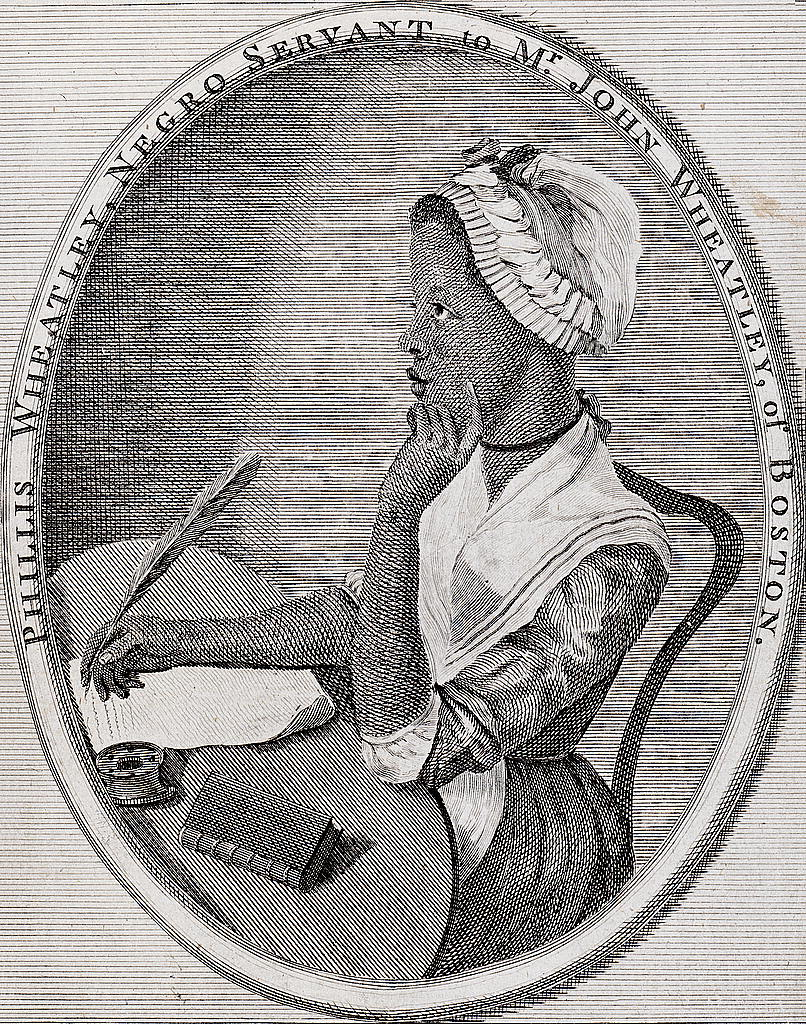
Phillis Wheatley, a slave, wrote poetry during the colonial period.

One of the first recorded poets of the Thirteen Colonies was Anne Bradstreet (1612 – 1672), who remains one of the early known women poets who wrote in English. The poems she published during her lifetime address religious and political themes. She also wrote tender evocations of home, family life and of her love for her husband, many of which remained unpublished until the 20th century.

Edward Taylor (1645–1729) wrote poems expounding Puritan virtues in a highly wrought metaphysical style that can be seen as typical of the early colonial period.

This narrow focus on the Puritan ethic was, understandably, the dominant note of most of the poetry written in the colonies during the 17th and early 18th centuries. The earliest "secular" poetry published in New England was by Samuel Danforth in his "almanacks" for 1647–1649, published at Cambridge; these included "puzzle poems" as well as poems on caterpillars, pigeons, earthquakes, and hurricanes. Of course, being a Puritan minister as well as a poet, Danforth never ventured far from a spiritual message.

A distinctly American lyric voice of the colonial period was Phillis Wheatley, a slave whose book "Poems on Various Subjects, Religious and Moral," was published in 1773. She was one of the best-known poets of her day, at least in the colonies, and her poems were typical of New England culture at the time, meditating on religious and classical ideas.

The 18th century saw an increasing emphasis on America as fit subject matter for its poets. This trend is most evident in the works of Philip Freneau (1752–1832), who is notable for the unusually sympathetic attitude to Native Americans shown in his writings, which had been interpreted as being reflective of his skepticism toward American culture. This late colonial-era poetry follows the means and methods of Pope and Gray in the era of Blake and Burns.. Rebecca Hammond Lard (1772–1855), has been described as "the first poet in Indiana".

On the whole, the development of poetry in the American colonies mirrors the development of the colonies themselves. The early poetry is dominated by the need to preserve the integrity of the Puritan ideals that created the settlement in the first place. As the colonists grew in confidence, the poetry they wrote increasingly reflected their drive towards independence. This shift in subject matter was not reflected in the mode of writing which tended to be conservative, to say the least. This can be seen as a product of the physical remove at which American poets operated from the center of English-language poetic developments in London.

== Postcolonial poetry ==
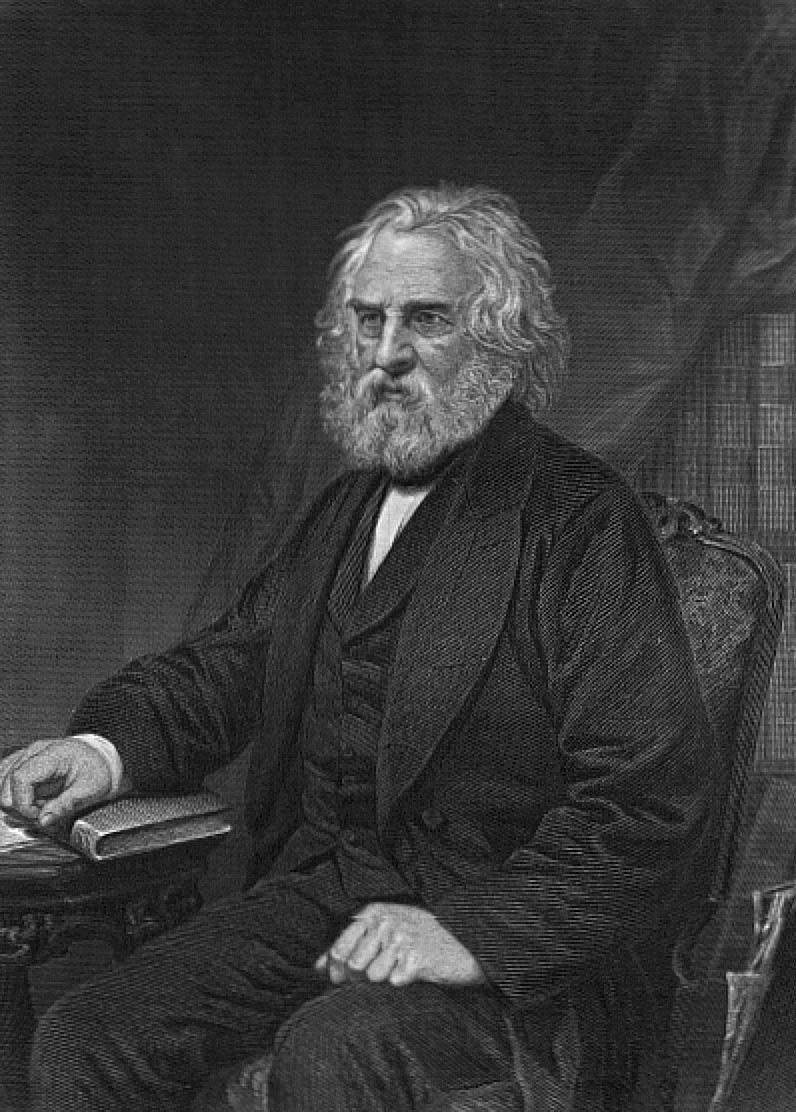
Henry Wadsworth Longfellow in 1873.

The first significant poet of the independent United States was William Cullen Bryant (1794–1878), whose great contribution was to write rhapsodic poems on the grandeur of prairies and forests. However, the first internationally acclaimed poet was Henry Wadsworth Longfellow (1807–1882) who nearly surpassed Alfred, Lord Tennyson in international popularity, and, alongside William Cullen Bryant, John Greenleaf Whittier, James Russell Lowell, and Oliver Wendell Holmes Sr., formed the Fireside Poets (known as the Schoolroom or Household Poets). The Fireside Poets were a group of 19th-century American poets from New England. The name "Fireside Poets" is derived from that popularity: their general adherence to poetic convention (standard forms, regular meter, and rhymed stanzas) made their body of work particularly suitable for being memorized and recited in school and at home, where it was a source of entertainment for families gathered around the fire. The poets' primary subjects were the domestic life, mythology, and politics of the United States, in which several of the poets were directly involved.

Other notable poets to emerge in the early and middle 19th century include Ralph Waldo Emerson (1803–1882), Edgar Allan Poe (1809–1849), Henry David Thoreau (1817–1862), Sidney Lanier (1842–1881), and James Whitcomb Riley (1849–1916). As might be expected, the works of all these writers are united by a common search for a distinctive American voice to distinguish them from their British counterparts. To this end, they explored the landscape and traditions of their native country as materials for their poetry.

The most significant example of this tendency may be The Song of Hiawatha by Longfellow. This poem uses Native American tales collected by Henry Rowe Schoolcraft, who was superintendent of Indian affairs for Michigan from 1836 to 1841. Longfellow imitated the meter of the Finnish epic poem Kalevala, possibly to avoid British models. The resulting poem, while a popular success, did not provide a model for future U.S. poets.

As time went on, the influence of the transcendentalism of the poet/philosophers Emerson and Thoreau increasingly influenced American poetry. Transcendentalism was the distinctly American strain of English Romanticism that began with William Wordsworth and Samuel Taylor Coleridge. Emerson, arguably one of the founders of transcendentalism, had visited England as a young man to meet these two English poets, as well as Thomas Carlyle. While Romanticism transitioned into Victorianism in post-reform England, it became energetic in America from the 1830s through to the Civil War.

Edgar Allan Poe was a unique poet during this time, brooding over themes of the macabre and dark, connecting his poetry and aesthetic vision to his philosophical, psychological, moral, and cosmological theories. Diverse authors in France, Sweden and Russia were heavily influenced by his works. The poet Charles Baudelaire was particularly obsessed with Poe, and drew upon the American poet to invent Symbolism in French poetry. Also, Poe's poem "The Raven" swept across Europe and was translated into many languages. He declined in popularity as a poet, however, and alienated himself from his contemporaries by publicly accusing Henry Wadsworth Longfellow of plagiarism—although Longfellow never responded. In the 20th century, American poet William Carlos Williams said of Poe that "in him American literature is anchored, in him alone, on solid ground."

== Whitman and Dickinson ==
The final emergence of a truly indigenous English-language poetry in the United States was the work of two poets, Walt Whitman (1819–1892) and Emily Dickinson (1830–1886). On the surface, these two poets could not have been less alike. Whitman's long lines, derived from the metric of the King James Version of the Bible, and his democratic inclusiveness stand in stark contrast with Dickinson's concentrated phrases and short lines and stanzas, derived from Protestant hymnals.

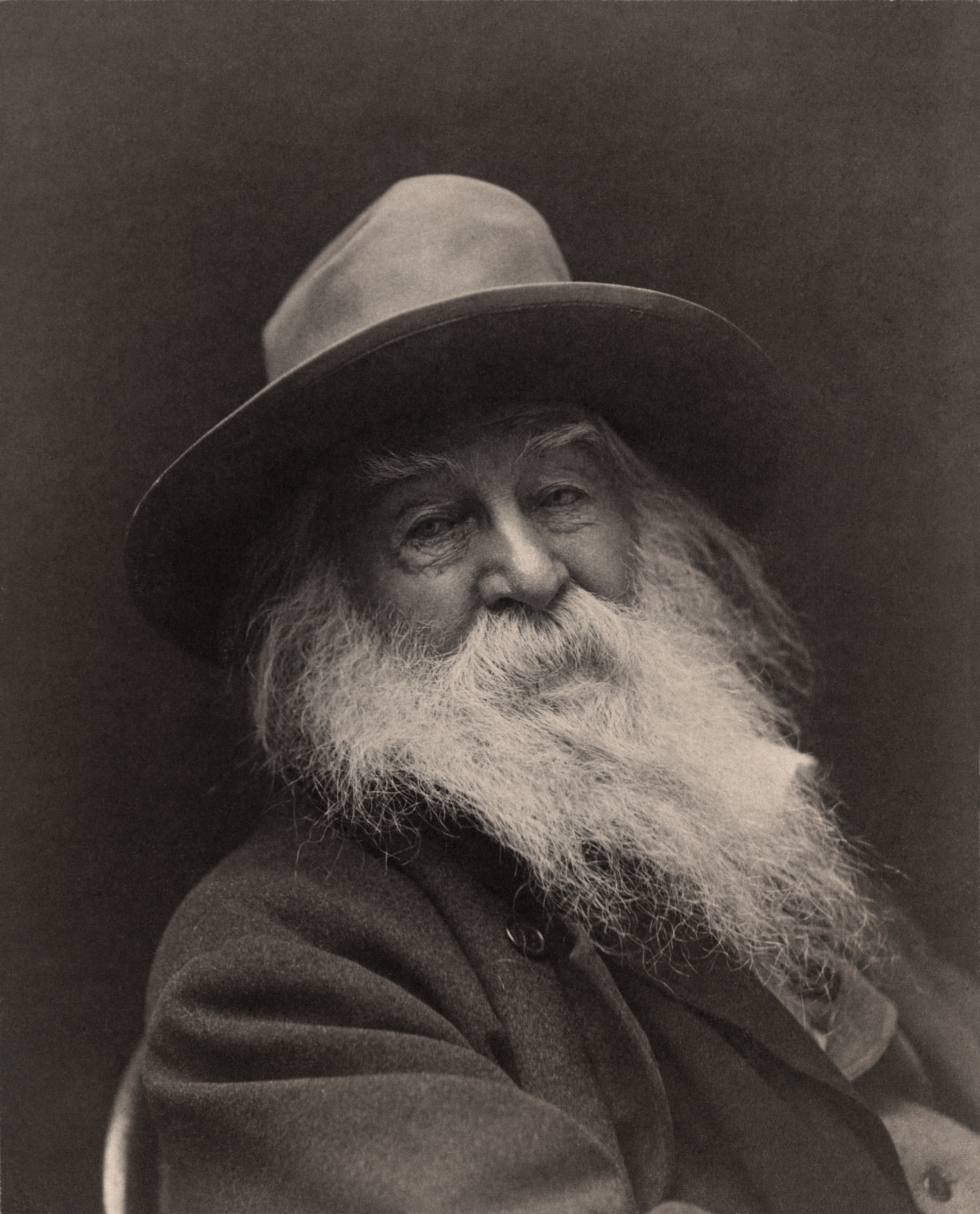
Walt Whitman

What links them is their common connection to Emerson (a passage from whom Whitman printed on the second edition of Leaves of Grass), and the daring originality of their visions. These two poets can be said to represent the birth of two major American poetic idioms—the free metric and direct emotional expression of Whitman, and the gnomic obscurity and irony of Dickinson—both of which would profoundly stamp the American poetry of the 20th century.

The development of these idioms, as well as conservative reactions against them, can be traced through the works of poets such as Edwin Arlington Robinson (1869–1935), Stephen Crane (1871–1900), Robert Frost (1874–1963), Carl Sandburg (1878–1967), and Edna St. Vincent Millay (1892-1950). Frost, in particular, is a commanding figure, who aligned strict poetic meter, particularly blank verse and terser lyrical forms, with a "vurry Amur'k'n" (as Pound put it) idiom. He successfully revitalized a rural tradition with many English antecedents from his beloved Golden Treasury and produced an oeuvre of major importance, rivaling or even excelling in achievement that of the key modernists and making him, within the full sweep of traditional modern English-language verse, a peer of Hardy and Yeats. But from Whitman and Dickinson the outlines of a distinctively new organic poetic tradition, less indebted to English formalism than Frost's work, were clear to see, and they would come to full fruition in the 1910s and 1920s. As Colin Falck noted, "To the Whitmanian heritage of cadenced free verse she [Millay] brings the greater reflective tightness of Robinson Jeffers."

== Modernism and after ==
This new idiom, combined with a study of 19th-century French poetry, formed the basis of American input into 20th-century English-language poetic modernism.

Ezra Pound (1885–1972), H.D. (1886–1961), and Richard Aldington (1892–1962), conceived of Imagism in 1913, which Pound defined as poetry written with an economy of words. T.S. Eliot (1888–1965) was among the leading figures at the time. Pound rejected traditional poetic form and meter and of Victorian diction. He believed both steered American poetry toward greater density, difficulty, and opacity, with an emphasis on techniques such as fragmentation, ellipsis, allusion, juxtaposition, ironic and shifting personae, and mythic parallelism. Pound opened American poetry to diverse influences, including the traditional poetries of China and Japan. Eliot's The Waste Land (1922) is a major example of the transition into literary modernity.

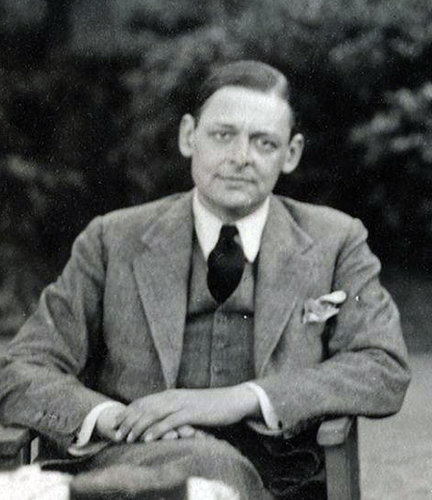
T.S. Eliot

Numerous other poets made important contributions at this revolutionary juncture, including Gertrude Stein (1874–1946), Amy Lowell (1874-1925), Wallace Stevens (1879–1955), William Carlos Williams (1883–1963), Hilda Doolittle (H.D.) (1886–1961), Marianne Moore (1887–1972), E.E. Cummings (1894–1962), and Hart Crane (1899–1932). The cerebral and skeptical Romantic Stevens helped revive the philosophical lyric, and Williams was to become exemplary for many later poets because he, more than any of his peers, contrived to marry spoken American English with free verse rhythms. Cummings remains notable for his experiments with typography and evocation of a spontaneous, childlike vision of reality.

Whereas these poets were unambiguously aligned with high modernism, other poets active in the United States in the first third of the 20th century were not. Among the more important of the latter were those who were associated with what came to be known as the New Criticism. These included John Crowe Ransom (1888–1974), Allen Tate (1899–1979), and Robert Penn Warren (1905–1989). Other poets of the era, such as Archibald MacLeish (1892–1982), experimented with modernist techniques but were drawn toward traditional modes of writing. Still others, such as Robinson Jeffers (1887–1962), adopted Modernist freedom while remaining aloof from Modernist factions and programs.

In addition, other early 20th-century poets maintained or were forced to maintain a peripheral relationship to high modernism, likely due to the racially charged themes of their work. They include Countee Cullen (1903–1946), Alice Dunbar Nelson (1875–1935), Gwendolyn Bennett (1902–1981), Langston Hughes (1902–1967), Claude McKay (1889–1948), Jean Toomer (1894–1967), and other African American poets of the Harlem Renaissance.

The modernist torch was carried in the 1930s mainly by the group of poets known as the Objectivists. These included Louis Zukofsky (1904–1978), Charles Reznikoff (1894–1976), George Oppen (1908–1984), Carl Rakosi (1903–2004) and, later, Lorine Niedecker (1903–1970). Kenneth Rexroth, who was published in the Objectivist Anthology, was, along with Madeline Gleason (1909–1973), a forerunner of the San Francisco Renaissance. Many of the Objectivists came from urban communities of new immigrants, and this new vein of experience and language enriched the growing American idiom.

== World War II and after ==
Archibald Macleish called John Gillespie Magee Jr. "the first poet of the war".

World War II saw the emergence of a new generation of poets, many of whom were influenced by Wallace Stevens and Richard Eberhart (1904–2005). Karl Shapiro (1913–2000), Randall Jarrell (1914–1965) and James Dickey (1923–1997) all wrote poetry that sprang from experience of active service. Together with Elizabeth Bishop (1911–1979), Theodor Seuss Geisel (Dr. Seuss) (1904-1991), Theodore Roethke (1908–1963) and Delmore Schwartz (1913–1966), they formed a generation of poets that in contrast to the preceding generation often wrote in traditional verse forms.

After the war, a number of new poets and poetic movements emerged. John Berryman (1914–1972) and Robert Lowell (1917–1977) were the leading lights in what was to become known as the Confessional movement, which was to have a strong influence on later poets like Sylvia Plath (1932–1963) and Anne Sexton (1928–1974). Though both Berryman and Lowell were closely acquainted with Modernism, they were mainly interested in exploring their own experiences as subject matter and a style that Lowell referred to as "cooked" – that is, consciously and carefully crafted.

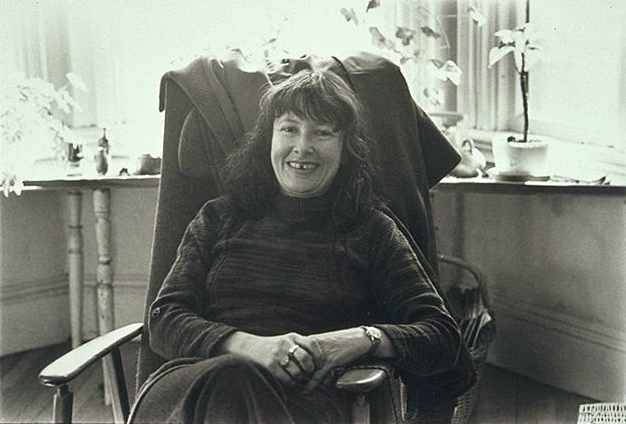
Denise Levertov

In contrast, the Beat poets, who included such figures as Jack Kerouac (1922–1969), Allen Ginsberg (1926–1997), Gregory Corso (1930–2001), Joanne Kyger (1934-2017), Gary Snyder (born 1930), Diane Di Prima (1934-2020), Amiri Baraka (1934-2014) and Lawrence Ferlinghetti (1919-2020), were distinctly raw. Reflecting, sometimes in an extreme form, the open, relaxed and searching society of the 1950s and 1960s, the Beats pushed the boundaries of the American idiom in the direction of demotic speech perhaps further than any other group.

Around the same time, the Black Mountain poets, under the leadership of Charles Olson (1910–1970), were working at Black Mountain College in North Carolina. These poets were exploring the possibilities of open form but in a much more programmatic way than the Beats. The main poets involved were Robert Creeley (1926–2005), Robert Duncan (1919–1988), Denise Levertov (1923–1997), Ed Dorn (1929–1999), Paul Blackburn (1926–1971), Hilda Morley (1916–1998), John Wieners (1934–2002), and Larry Eigner (1927–1996). They based their approach to poetry on Olson's 1950 essay Projective Verse, in which he called for a form based on the line, a line based on human breath and a mode of writing based on perceptions juxtaposed so that one perception leads directly to another. This in turn influenced the works of Michael McClure (1932-2020), Kenneth Irby (1936–2015), and Ronald Johnson (1935–1998), poets from the Midwestern United States who moved to San Francisco, and in so doing extended the influence of the Black Mountain school geographically westward; their participation in the poetic circles of San Francisco can be seen as partly forming the basis for what would later be known as "Language poetry."

Other poets often associated with the Black Mountain are Cid Corman (1924–2004) and Theodore Enslin (1925-2011), but they are perhaps correctly viewed as direct descendants of the Objectivists. One-time Black Mountain College resident, composer John Cage (1912–1992), along with Jackson Mac Low (1922–2004), wrote poetry based on chance or aleatory techniques. Inspired by Zen, Dada and scientific theories of indeterminacy, they were to prove to be important influences on the 1970s U.S. avant-garde.

The Beats and some of the Black Mountain poets often are considered to have been responsible for the San Francisco Renaissance. However, as previously noted, San Francisco had become a hub of experimental activity from the 1930s thanks to Kenneth Rexroth and Gleason. Other poets involved in this scene included Charles Bukowski (1920–1994) and Jack Spicer (1925–1965). These poets sought to combine a contemporary spoken idiom with inventive formal experiment.

Jerome Rothenberg (1931-2024) is well known for his work in ethnopoetics, but he was the coiner of the term "deep image", which he used to describe the work of poets like Robert Kelly (born 1935), Diane Wakoski (born 1937) and Clayton Eshleman (1935-2021). Deep Image poetry was inspired by the symbolist theory of correspondences, in particular the work of Spanish poet Federico García Lorca. The term later was popularized by Robert Bly. The Deep Image movement was the most international, accompanied by a flood of new translations from Latin American and European poets such as Pablo Neruda, César Vallejo and Tomas Tranströmer. Some of the poets who became associated with Deep Image are Galway Kinnell, James Wright, Mark Strand and W.S. Merwin. Both Merwin and California poet Gary Snyder became known for their interest in environmental and ecological concerns.

The Small Press poets (sometimes called the mimeograph movement) are another influential and eclectic group of poets who surfaced in the San Francisco Bay Area in the late 1950s and are still active today. Fiercely independent editors, who were also poets, edited and published low-budget periodicals and chapbooks of emerging poets who might otherwise have gone unnoticed. This work ranged from formal to experimental. Gene Fowler, A.D. Winans, Hugh Fox, street poet and activist Jack Hirschman, Paul Foreman, Jim Cohn, John Bennett, and F.A. Nettelbeck are among the many poets who are still actively continuing the Small Press Poets tradition. Many have turned to the new medium of the Web for its distribution capabilities.

Los Angeles poets: Leland Hickman (1934–1991), Holly Prado (1938-2019), Harry Northup (born 1940), Wanda Coleman (1946-2013), Michael C. Ford (born 1939), Kate Braverman (1949-2019), Eloise Klein Healy (born 1943), Bill Mohr, Laurel Ann Bogen, met at Beyond Baroque Literary Arts Center, in Venice, California. They are lyric poets, heavily autobiographical; some are practitioners of the experimental long poem. Their predecessors in Los Angeles were Ann Stanford (1916–1987), Thomas McGrath (1916–1990), Jack Hirschman (1933-2021). Beyond Baroque Literary Arts Center, created by George Drury Smith in 1968, is the central literary arts center in the Los Angeles area.

Just as the West Coast had the San Francisco Renaissance and the Small Press Movement, the East Coast produced the New York School. This group aimed to write poetry that spoke directly of everyday experience in everyday language and produced a poetry of urbane wit and elegance that contrasts with the work of their Beat contemporaries (though in other ways, including their mutual respect for American slang and disdain for academic or "cooked" poetry, they were similar). Leading members of the group include John Ashbery (1927-2017), Frank O'Hara (1926–1966), Kenneth Koch (1925–2002), James Schuyler (1923–1991), Barbara Guest (1920–2006), Ted Berrigan (1934–1983), Anne Waldman (born 1945) and Bernadette Mayer (born 1945). Of this group, John Ashbery, in particular, has emerged as a defining force in recent poetics, and he is regarded by many as the most important American poet since World War II.

== American poetry today ==
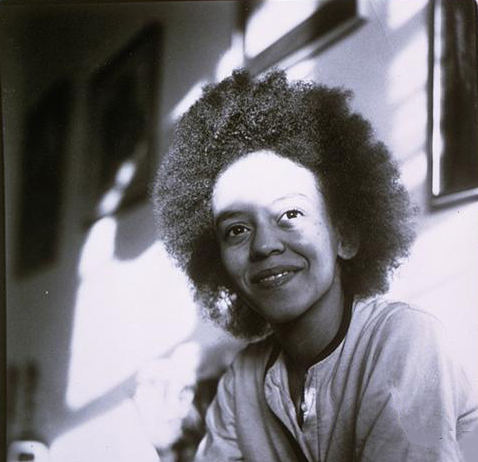
Nikki Giovanni, 1943-2024

The last 40 years of poetry in the United States have brought new groups, schools, and trends into vogue. The 1970s saw a revival of interest in surrealism, with the more prominent poets working in this field being Andrei Codrescu (born in 1946), Russell Edson (1935-2014) and Maxine Chernoff (born in 1952). Performance poetry emerged from the Beat and hippie happenings, the talk-poems of David Antin (1932-2016), and ritual events performed by Rothenberg, to become a serious poetic stance which embraces multiculturalism and a range of poets from a multiplicity of cultures. This mirrored a general growth of interest in poetry by African Americans including Robert Hayden (1913-1980), Gwendolyn Brooks (1917–2000), Maya Angelou (1928–2014), Ishmael Reed (born in 1938), Nikki Giovanni (born in 1943), and Detrick Hughes (born in 1966).

Another group of poets, the Language school (or L=A=N=G=U=A=G=E, after the magazine that bears that name), have continued and extended the Modernist and Objectivist traditions of the 1930s. Some poets associated with the group are Lyn Hejinian, Ron Silliman, Tom Mandel, Bob Perelman and Leslie Scalapino. Their poems—fragmentary, purposefully ungrammatical, sometimes mixing texts from different sources and idioms—can be by turns abstract, lyrical, and highly comic.

The Language school includes a high proportion of women, which mirrors another general trend—the rediscovery and promotion of poetry written both by earlier and contemporary women poets. A number of the more prominent African American poets to emerge are women, and other prominent women writers include Adrienne Rich (1929–2012), Jean Valentine (1934–2020), and Amy Gerstler (born in 1956).

Although poetry in traditional classical forms had mostly fallen out of fashion by the 1960s, the practice was kept alive by poets of great formal virtuosity like James Merrill (1926–1995), author of the epic poem The Changing Light at Sandover, Richard Wilbur, and British-born San Francisco poet Thom Gunn. The 1980s and 1990s saw a re-emergent interest in traditional form, sometimes dubbed New Formalism or Neoformalism. These include poets such as Molly Peacock, Brad Leithauser, Dana Gioia, Donna J. Stone, Timothy Steele, Alicia Ostriker, and Marilyn Hacker. Some of the more outspoken New Formalists have declared that the return to rhyme and more fixed meters to be the new avant-garde. Their critics sometimes associate this traditionalism with the conservative politics of the Reagan era, noting the recent appointment of Gioia as chair of the National Endowment for the Arts.

Haiku has attracted a community of American poets dedicated to its development as a poetic genre in English. The extremely terse Japanese haiku first influenced the work of Ezra Pound and the Imagists, and post-war poets such as Kerouac and Richard Wright wrote substantial bodies of original haiku in English. Other poets such as Ginsberg, Snyder, Wilbur, Merwin, and many others have at least dabbled with haiku, often simply as a syllabic form. Starting in 1963, with the founding of the journal American Haiku, poets such as Cor van den Heuvel, Nick Virgilio, Raymond Roseliep, John Wills, Anita Virgil, Gary Hotham, Marlene Mountain, Wally Swist, Peggy Willis Lyles, George Swede, Michael Dylan Welch, Jim Kacian, and others have created significant oeuvres of haiku poetry, evincing continuities with both Transcendentalism and Imagism and often maintaining an anti-anthropocentric environmental focus on nature during an unparalleled age of habitat destruction and human alienation.

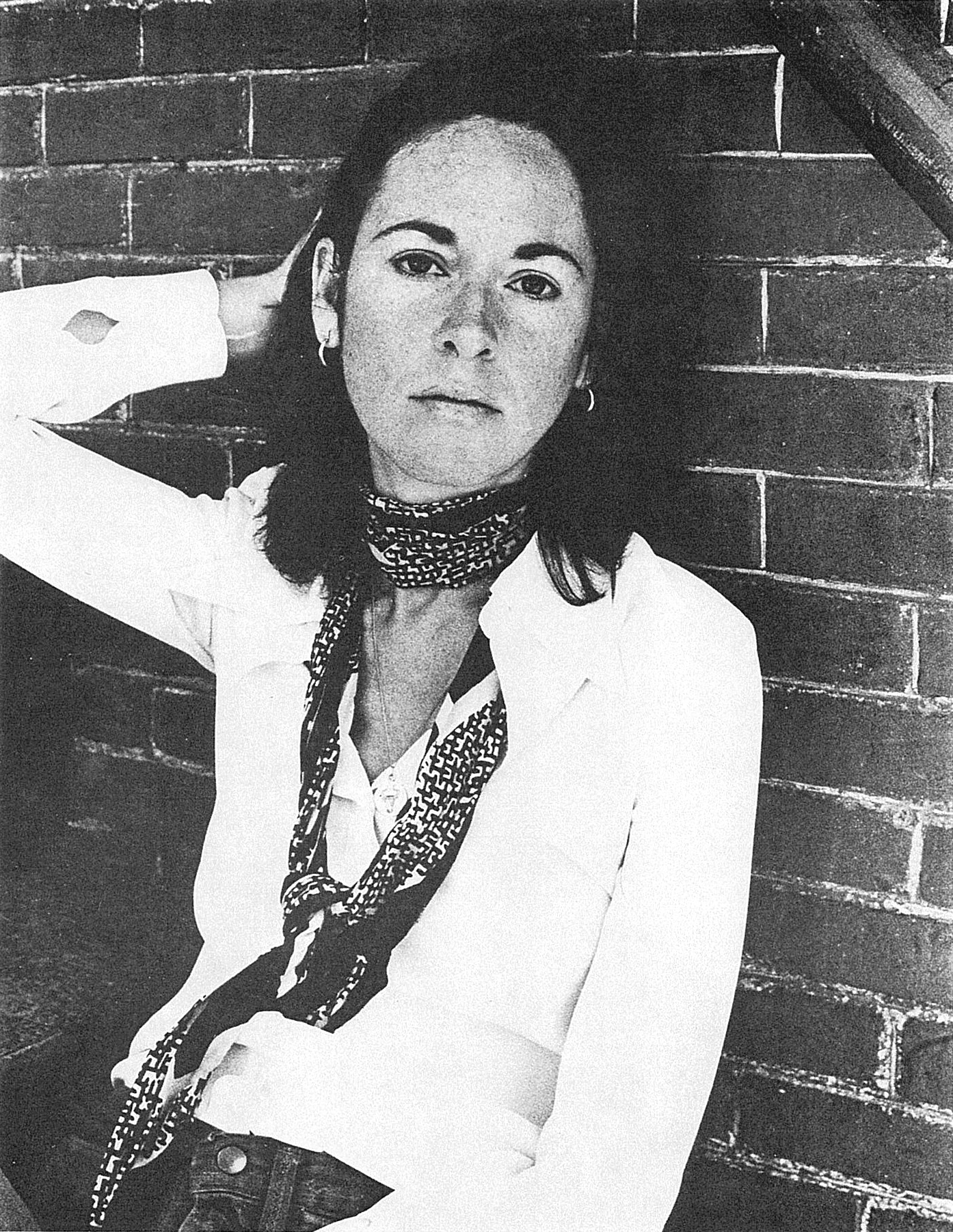
Louise Glück, 1943 – 2023

The last two decades have seen a revival of the Beat poetry spoken word tradition, in the form of the poetry slam. Chicago construction worker Marc Smith turned urban poetry performance into audience-judged competitions in 1984. Poetry slams emphasize a style of writing that is topical, provocative and easily understood. Poetry slam opened the door for a generation of writers and spoken word performers, including Alix Olson, Apollo Poetry, Taylor Mali, and Saul Williams, and inspired hundreds of open mics across the U.S. Poetry has become a significant presence on the Web, with a number of new online journals, 'zines, blogs and other websites. An example of the fluid nature of web-based poetry communities is, "thisisbyus, now defunct, yet this community of writers continues and expands on Facebook and has allowed both novice and professional poets to explore writing styles. During the contemporary time frame, there were major independent voices who defied links to well-known American poetic movements and forms such as poet and literary critic Robert Peters, greatly influenced by the Victorian English poet Robert Browning's poetic monologues, became reputable for executing his monologic personae like his Mad King Ludwig II of Bavaria into popular one-man performances. Another example is Louise Glück who cites Emily Dickinson and William Blake as her influences. Critics and scholars have discussed whether or not she is a confessional poet. Sylvia Plath may be another of her influences.

The Library of Congress produces a guide to American poetry inspired by the 9/11 attacks, including anthologies and books dedicated to the subject.

Robert Pinsky has a special place in American poetry as he was the poet laureate of the United States for three terms. No other poet has been so honored. His "Favorite Poem Project" is unique, inviting all citizens to share their all-time favorite poetic composition and why they love it. He is a professor at Boston University and the poetry editor at Slate. "Poems to Read" is a demonstration of his poetic vision, joining the word and the common man.

With increased consciousness of society's impact on natural ecosystems, it is inexorable that such themes would become integrated into poetry. The foundations of poems about nature are found in the work of Henry David Thoreau and Walt Whitman. The modern ecopoetics movement was pioneered by Jack Collom, who taught a dedicated course on ecopoetics at Naropa University in Boulder, Colorado for 17 years. Contemporary poetry on environmental sustainability is found among the works of J.S. Shipman, for example, in, "Calling on You."

On October 13, 2016, the Nobel committee announced that it would be awarding Bob Dylan the literature prize "for having created new poetic expressions within the great American song tradition". The New York Times reported: "Mr. Dylan, 75, is the first musician to win the award, and his selection on Thursday is perhaps the most radical choice in a history stretching back to 1901." Horace Engdahl, a member of the Nobel Committee, described Dylan's place in literary history:

a singer worthy of a place beside the Greek bards, beside Ovid, beside the Romantic visionaries, beside the kings and queens of the blues, beside the forgotten masters of brilliant standards.

The growth in the popularity of graduate creative writing programs has given poets the opportunity to make a living as teachers. This increased professionalization of poetry, combined with the reluctance of most major book and magazine presses to publish poetry, has meant that, for the foreseeable future at least, poetry may have found its new home in the academy and in small independent journals. A prominent example was Nobel Laureate Louise Glück who taught at Yale University.

== See also ==
- Academy of American Poets

== Works cited ==
- Aldridge, John W. (1971). After the lost generation: a critical study of the writers of two wars. Freeport, N.Y: Books for Libraries Press. ISBN 9780836921410.
- Baym, Nina, ed. (1998). The Norton anthology of American literature (5th ed.). New York: W.W. Norton. ISBN 0393958728.
- Cavinder, Fred D. (1985). The Indiana book of records, firsts, and fascinating facts. Bloomington: Indiana University Press. ISBN 0253140013.
- Danforth, Samuel; Royster, Paul (2006-06-27) [1650]. ""Samuel Danforth's Almanack Poems and Chronological Tables 1647-1649" by Samuel Danforth and Paul Royster (transcriber & editor)". Faculty Publications, Unl Libraries. Digitalcommons.unl.edu.
- Davis, Virginia (1997). The Tayloring shop: essays on the poetry of Edward Taylor in honor of Thomas M. and Virginia L. Davis. Newark, Del: University of Delaware Press. ISBN 0874136237.
- Dempsey, Jack (2000). Thomas Morton of Merrymount: the life and renaissance of an early American poet. Scituate, MA: Digital Scanning. ISBN 1582182094.
- Einhorn, Lois J.; Mintz, M. C.; Crelin, Edmund S. (2000). The Native American oral tradition: voices of the spirit and soul. Westport, Conn: Praeger. ISBN 027595790X.
- Fenollosa, Ernest; Pound, Ezra; Saussy, Haun; Stalling, Jonathan; Klein, Lucas (2008). The Chinese written character as a medium for poetry. New York: Fordham University Press. ISBN 9780823228683.
- Gregson, Susan (2002). Phillis Wheatley. Capstone Press. ISBN 978-0-7368-1033-3.
- Hair, Ross (2010). Ronald Johnson's modernist collage poetry (1st ed.). New York: Palgrave Macmillan. ISBN 978-0230108691.
- Heymann, C. David (1980). American aristocracy: the lives and times of James Russell, Amy, and Robert Lowell. New York: Dodd, Mead. ISBN 0396076084.
- Larcom, Lucy (1879). Landscape in American Poetry. New York: D. Appleton and Co.
- Lubbers, Klaus (1994). Born for the shade: stereotypes of the native American in United States literature and the visual arts, 1776-1894. Amsterdam Atlanta, GA: Rodopi. ISBN 9789051836288.
- Millay, Edna St Vincent (1992). Falck, Colin (ed.). Selected poems (Centenary, 1., [2. Dr.] ed.). New York, NY: HarperCollins. ISBN 0060922885.
- Moldenhauer, Joseph J (1968). "Murder as a Fine Art: Basic Connections between Poe's Aesthetics, Psychology, and Moral Vision". PMLA. 83 (2): 284–297. doi:10.2307/1261183. JSTOR 1261183. S2CID 147288533.
- Moody, Anthony David (2009). Ezra Pound, poet: a portrait of the man and his work. 1: The young genius, 1885-1920. Oxford: Oxford University Press. ISBN 978-0-19-957146-8.
- Morton, Thomas (1999). Dempsey, Jack (ed.). New English Canaan. Digital Scanning. ISBN 9781582182063.
- Moulton, Charles (1901). The Library of Literary Criticism of English and American Authors. The Moulton Publishing Company. Original from the New York Public Library Digitized Oct 27, 2006.
- Nelson, Cary (1989). Repression and recovery: modern American poetry and the politics of cultural memory, 1910-1945. Madison, Wis: University of Wisconsin press. ISBN 0299123405.
- Parini, Jay; Miller, Brett C., eds. (1993). The Columbia history of American poetry. New York: Columbia University Press. ISBN 0231078366.
- Perkins, David (1976). A history of modern poetry. Cambridge, Mass: Belknap Press of Harvard University Press. ISBN 0674399412.
- Untermeyer, Louis (1921). Modern American Poetry. Harcourt, Brace and Company. Original from the New York Public Library Digitized Oct 6, 2006.
- Williams, George (1882). History of the Negro Race in America from 1619 to 1880. G.P. Putnam's Sons. Original from Harvard University Digitized Aug 18, 2006.
- Williams, William Carlos (1966). The William Carlos Williams Reader. New York: New Directions. ISBN 0811202399.
- Young, Alexander (1846). Chronicles of the First Planters of the Colony of Massachusetts Bay, 1623-1636. Boston: C. C. Little and J. Brown. ISBN 1019524537.
