= The British Haiku Society =

Promotion and education of English haiku

- Formation: 1990
- Type: Charity Number 1002064
- Location: United Kingdom
- Members: haiku poets and enthusiasts from any part of the world
- Official language: English
- President: Iliyana Stoyanova
- Website: britishhaikusociety.org.uk

The British Haiku Society was formed in 1990 to promote haiku and to teach and publish Haiku in English. Its membership of approximately 400 includes members from 27 countries.

== Activities ==
The British Haiku Society holds events and The British Haiku Society Awards including The Museum of Haiku Literature Awards and The Haibungaku Awards. From the 1990s until 2004 the Society also offered a Sasakawa Prize.

In 1992 The British Haiku Society published The Haiku Hundred, an anthology of haiku in English to bring haiku to the attention of UK readers.

The first president of the BHS (1990–1997) was James Kirkup, followed by David Cobb (1997-2001), Martin Lucas (2002-2006), Annie Bachini (2007-2009), President vacant (2010-2012), Graham High (2013-2015), Kate B Hall (2016-2018), Colin Blundell (2019-2021), David Bingham (Acting President, 2021-2022), Roger Noons (Acting President, 2023), and Iliyana Stoyanova (2023-present).

Several haiku groups operate under the auspices of The British Haiku Society including The London Haiku Group, Greenwood Haiku Group, Leaves to a Tree Haiku Group, Yorkshire-Lancashire Group, The Oxford Haiku Group, Edinburgh Haiku Circle, Essex Haiku Group, and Cambridge Haiku Group.

== Publications ==
=== Journal ===
The journal of The British Haiku Society is Blithe Spirit, which is a salute to Reginald Horace Blyth and to poetry via Percy Bysshe Shelley’s poem To a Skylark with its opening line “Hail to thee, blithe spirit!”. Blithe Spirit publishes volumes of four issues a year featuring haiku and related forms such as tanka, haibun, book reviews, and essays. The journal is currently edited by Iliyana Stoyanova.. Since 1990, the previous editors have been David Cobb, Richard Goring, Colin Blundell, Jackie Hardy, Caroline Gourlay, Annie Bachini, Graham High, Mark Rutter, David Bingham, David Serjeant, Shrikaanth Krishnamurti and Caroline Skanne.

Haiku appearing in Blithe Spirit regularly feature in those recognised as being among the top 100 best haiku by European haijan (haiku poets). Contributors to Blithe Spirit have included the late Raymond Roseliep, American haiku poet and publisher Jim Kacian, American haiku poets Cor van den Heuvel and Michael Dylan Welch and Lee Gurga, Canadian haiku poet George Swede and British haiku poet Roger Watson. The BHS also produce a newsletter The Brief currently edited by Maya Daneva.

- The British Haiku Society Blithe Spirit: Journal of the British Haiku Society ISSN 1353-3320

=== Books ===
- Kirkup J, Cobb D, Mortimer P (Eds.) (1992) The Haiku Hundred Iron Press, Manchester ISBN 0-906228-42-5
- Cobb D (Ed.) (1994) The Genius of Haiku: Readings from R H Blyth on Poetry, Life, and Zen The British Haiku Society, ISBN 978-0952239703
- Cobb D, Lucas M (Eds.) (1998) The Iron Book of British Haiku Iron Press, Manchester ISBN 0-906228-67-0
- Lucas M (2007) Stepping Stones: A Way Into haiku The British Haiku Society, ISBN 978-0952239796
- Graham High (Ed.) Barbed Wire Blossoms: The Museum of Haiku Literature Award Anthology 1992-2011 The British Haiku Society ISBN 978-1-906333010
- Hugh G (Ed.) (2015) A Silver Tapestry: The Best of 25 Years of Critical Writing from The British Haiku Society The British Haiku Society, ISBN 978-0952239796
- Stoyanova I (Ed.) (2017) Ekphrasis: The British Haiku Society Members' Anthology 2017 The British Haiku Society, ISBN 978-1-906333-08-9
- Shimield A (Ed.) (2018) wild: the british haiku society anthology 2018 The British Haiku Society, ISBN 978-1-906333-09-6
- Bingham D, Stoyanova I (Eds.) (2019) Where silence becomes song: International Haiku Conference Anthology The British Haiku Society, ISBN 978-1-906333-10-2
- Blundell C, Stoyanova I, Bingham D (Eds.) (2019) Harmony Within Diversity: A collection of papers delivered at the International Haiku Conference in St Albans, UK 31 May - 2 June 2019 The British Haiku Society, ISBN 978-1-906333-12-6
- Hall KB (Ed.) (2019) Root: The British Haiku Society Members' Anthology 2019 The British Haiku Society, ISBN 978-1-906333-11-9
- Stoyanova I (Ed.) (2021) Temple The British Haiku Society ISBN 9781906333164
- Storr I, van Noort R, Aubrey K, Smith V (Eds.) (2022) Coastal Visions The British Haiku Society ISBN 9781906333188
- Marcoff AA (Ed.) (2022) In Sun, Snow & Rain: Tanka From a World of Song The British Haiku Society ISBN 9781906333195
- Peat A (Ed.) Humour The British Haiku Society ISBN 9781906333225
- Marcoff AA, Bingham D, Stoyanova I, Hristov V (Eds.) Shining Wind/Сияен вятър The British Haiku Society ISBN 9781906333218
- Somerville N (Ed.) (2025) Hope The British Haiku Society ISBN 9781906333232

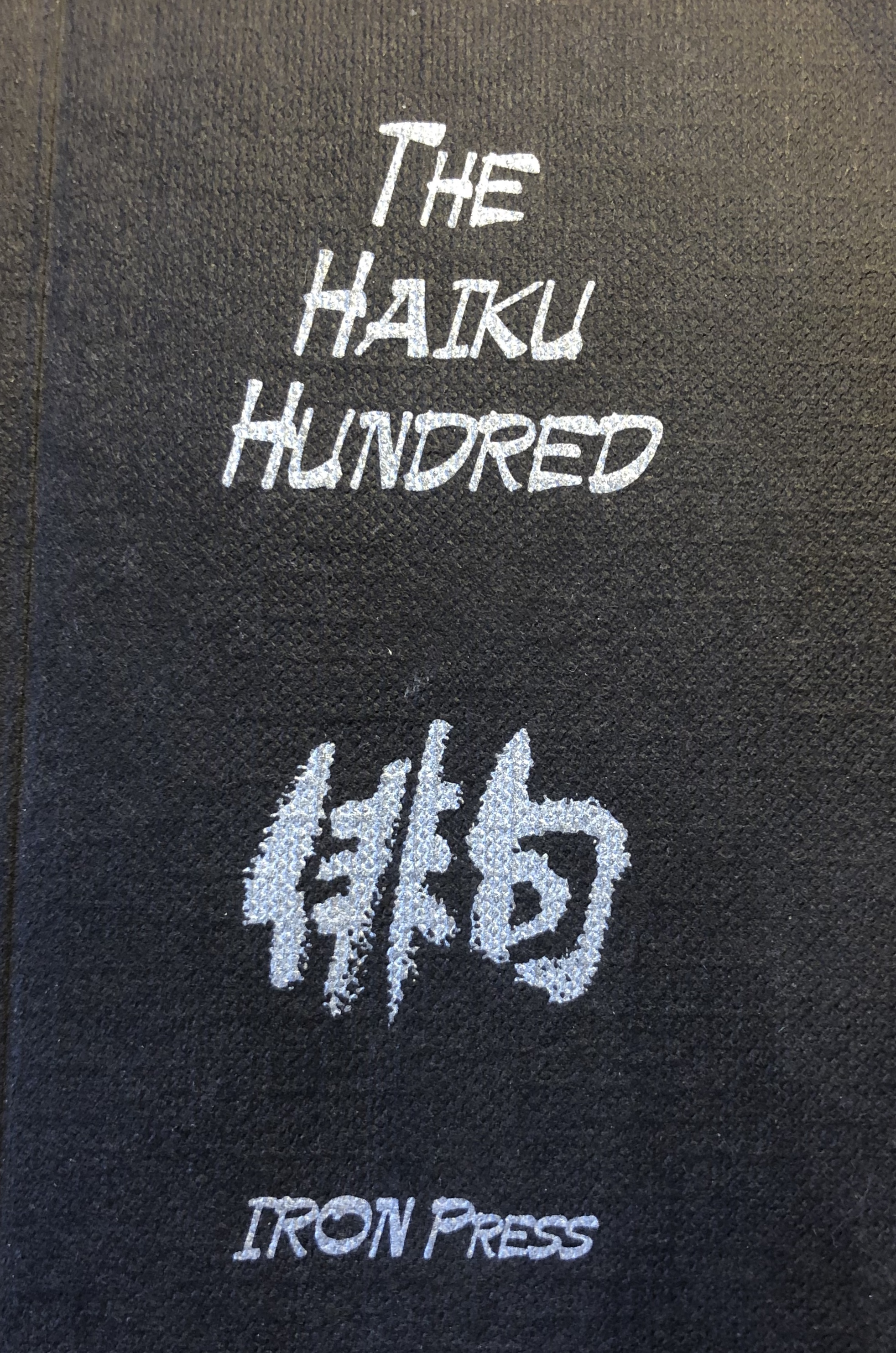
The Haiku Hundred

== Recognition ==
The British Haiku Society is listed in the International Who's Who in Poetry. The role of the BHS in the development of haiku in the UK has been recognised by the International Academic Forum (IAFOR) who sponsor the annual IAFOR Vladimir Devidé Haiku Award. The British Haiku Society is listed in The Haiku Foundation and Haikupedia.

== The British Haiku Society in the media ==
In 2009, the president of the society complained about the quality of haiku being submitted to a haiku string competition where the winning entries, which were flashed on a screen at London King's Cross railway station, were judged by Yoko Ono and Jackie Kay.

The British Haiku Society was featured in a BBC Four programme on Utopia in August 2017. In May 2019, the British Haiku Society held an International Haiku Conference in St Albans, UK.

== See also ==
- Haiku Society of America (HSA)
- Haiku
- Haiku in English
- Matsuo Basho
- Reginald Horace Blyth
