= Dee Evetts =

English poet and writer (born 1943)

Dee Evetts (born 16 May 1943) is an English haiku poet and writer.

== Career ==
After dropping out from Cambridge in his second year, Evetts spent several years teaching English, first with Voluntary Service Overseas in Thailand and subsequently in Sweden. In 1974 he turned to carpentry and cabinetmaking for a living. He first began writing haiku in the late 1960s, cultivating his own style of senryū from the 1980s onwards; his self-acknowledged influences in this period included George Swede, Cor van den Heuvel, and John Wills. In 1990, he co-founded the British Haiku Society together with David Cobb. That same year, however, he moved to New York City, where he became involved in the haiku and arts scene: in 1991, he co-founded the Spring Street Haiku Group, and in 1993 became Vice President of the Haiku Society of America; he went on to serve as Secretary of the Society from 1996 to 1999. In the summer of 1994, he was involved in the 42nd Street Art Project organised by Creative Time, selecting haiku to be displayed on the marquees of New York theatres for several months. The New York Times’s otherwise critical review of the controversial public art installation highlighted Evetts's contribution as one of the most successful ones.

1997 saw the publication of Evetts's first major collection of haiku and senryu by the Red Moon Press: Endgrain "helped establish Evetts as a front-runner in American haiku and senryu." The book won the Haiku Society of America's Merit Book Award 1998, with the judges noting the "unforgettable images drawn from alert and perceptive participation in moments of real life." A further collection, Home After Dark, was published in 2002. Between 1999 and 2018 he co-edited, together with Jim Kacian, the first ten volumes of the serial anthology, A New Resonance: Emerging Voices in English-Language Haiku, which several times won the Haiku Society of America's Merit Book Award in the category, Best Anthology.

== Books ==
Evetts is the author of four collections of poetry:

- Home After Dark, Kings Road Press, 2002
- Endgrain: Haiku/Senryu 1986-1997, Red Moon Press, 1997
- A Small Ceremony, From Here Press, 1988
- Broken Flower-Pots, Self-Published, 1970

His work has been included in a number of landmark haiku anthologies, most notably:

- Haiku in English: The First Hundred Years, edited by Jim Kacian, Philip Rowland, and Allan Burns, W. W. Norton & Company, 2013
- The Haiku Anthology, edited by Cor van den Heuvel, 3rd edition, W. W. Norton & Company, 1999
- The Iron Book of British Haiku, edited by David Cobb and Martin Lucas, Iron Press, 1998
