= Haiku in English =

English-language poetry in a style of Japanese origin

A haiku in English, or English-language haiku (ELH), is an English-language poem written in a form or style inspired by Japanese haiku. Emerging in the early 20th century, English haiku retains many characteristics of its Japanese predecessor—typically focusing on nature, seasonal changes, and imagistic language—while evolving to suit the rhythms and structures of English languages and cultures outside of Japan. The form has gained widespread popularity across the world and continues to develop through both literary experimentation and community-based haiku movements.

== Typical characteristics ==
=== Length and structure ===
Traditional Japanese haiku are structured around the number of phonetic units known as on, with a three-phrase format in which seventeen on are distributed in a 5–7–5 pattern (five in the first phrase, seven in the second phrase, and five in the third). Because there is no exact equivalent to an on in the English language the number of phonetic units used in English-language haiku is ambiguous, with a variety of approaches available.

==== Organic and Free Form Haiku ====
Organic haiku form, also known as free-form haiku, is an approach to writing haiku in English that emphasizes natural rhythm, expressive clarity, and responsiveness to the poem’s content rather than adherence to traditional structural constraints such as syllable counts. In this approach, poets allow the shape and cadence of a haiku to emerge intuitively, letting the form evolve in response to what the poem is trying to convey. The term organic refers to "the process of finding the form, during the conscious editing process, in direct response to subject matter, theme and emotional tone." Rather than imposing an external structure, poets shape each poem according to its internal logic and emotional resonance. The most commonly used variation of this form in ELH reflects this flexibility: a three-line structure in which the second line is often slightly longer than the first and third, and the total poem typically contains fewer than seventeen syllables.

==== 5–7–5 Syllable Counting ====
Many attempts to emulate Japanese on counting have been attempted in English-language haiku. The most basic is structuring English haiku in a 5–7–5 English-syllable pattern. Linguists, however, note that on are often shorter than English syllables, such that a seventeen-on phrase is, on average, shorter than seventeen English-syllables.

Notwithstanding this difference in length of phonetic units, the presence of seventeen on in Japanese haiku prompted an idea that English-language haiku should adopt a similar structure in which syllables are arranged across three lines in a 5–7–5 structure, resulting in the "urban myth of 5–7–5" haiku. While early translators of Japanese haiku into English did not consistently follow a 5–7–5 pattern, the 5–7–5 syllable format gained traction in the mid-20th century, promoted by scholars such as Harold G. Henderson and Kenneth Yasuda, who believed that mirroring the traditional Japanese structure would honor and preserve the essence of haiku in English translation. Widespread adoption of the 5–7–5 misunderstanding was reinforced by its simplicity and appeal in educational settings, where it became a convenient teaching tool. As haiku scholar Charles Trumbull writes,

This is haiku as it is almost universally taught in American schools—a poem about nature written in three lines, of five, seven five syllables. It has become a cliché or joke in the haiku community. It is an invidious joke, however, because it serves to perpetuate a mistaken impression of what a haiku is and has been and totally misses what it might offer to young minds.

As well, haiku writer and scholar Cor van den Heuvel writes, the 5–7–5 form is “now mostly written by schoolchildren as an exercise to learn how to count syllables, by beginners who know little about the true essence of haiku, or by those who just like to have a strict form with which to practice.” As a result of the 5–7–5 form’s presence in elementary schools, the 5–7–5 pattern has persisted in popular culture despite many contemporary English-language haiku poets working in other approaches that better reflect haiku’s brevity and aesthetic qualities.

==== 2–3–2 Accented Beat Counting ====
Other haiku scholars, like R.H. Blyth and William Higginson, propose that an effective English equivalent to the Japanese haiku form could be three lines with 2–3–2 accented beats. This rhythm would create a structure that mirrors the traditional Japanese haiku using natural English poetic rhythms—particularly those found in pentameter. The result is a form that feels familiar to English speakers.

==== 8–8–8 Metrical Approach ====
Haiku theorist Richard Gilbert extends Higginson’s shift from syllable counting to accentuating beats per line, noting that the “best conceptual means of approaching the problem of emulation of the Japanese haiku is metrical, musical, and analogical.” Further, Gilbert notes that the traditional seventeen-ons of Japanese haiku are “based on a 24-beat template which divides into 3 lines of 8 beats each," with the possibility of each eight-beat line can containing “silent beats.” This 8–8–8 metrical approach divides the traditional Japanese haiku up into three “musical measures” where “each metrical line, composed of 8 beats (articulated or “silent”) would represent a measure,” such that a “complete haiku would be composed of three measures.” This musical analogy accounts for why many traditional Japanese haiku containing more or less than seventeen-on were widely written, for it shifts the emphasis away from counting on (syllables), to counting beats within a measure, though not being constrained within Higginson’s 2–3–2 accented beat template. Gilbert proposes that the 8–8–8 metrical approach to ELH composition “metrically emulate Japanese haiku.”

==== Other Variant ELH Forms ====
The most common variation from the three-line standard is one line, sometimes called a monoku. It emerged from being more than an occasional exception during the late 1970s, to contemporary ELH writers composing "outstanding haiku in...one line."

=== Cutting ===
English-language haiku has developed a unique approach to the cut (kire) in haiku. In traditional Japanese haiku, the cut is a poetic technique that introduces a strong pause, or break, in both the rhythm and meaning of a verse. The cut divides the poem into two seemingly unrelated parts, inviting the reader to bridge the gap. This connection isn’t made through straightforward logic, but rather through intuition, inspiration, or a sense of inference. The cut both separates and connects—it splits the poem while also creating a space for the reader to generate an imaginative link between the parts. In traditional Japanese haiku, the cut is achieved through the use of a “cutting word” (kireji). Japanese poetics developed eighteen cutting words used in haiku, and the use of a cutting word was a requirement in traditional Japanese haiku.

However, there is no equivalent to a cutting word in English. As such, English-language haiku uses punctuation, spaces, line-breaks, or grammatical breaks to generate the cut.

The following haiku demonstrates how a comma can be used to create the cut,

old home
the light we’d leave
on, off

— P.H. Fischer

The following demonstrates how spacing can create the cut,

after the garden party the garden

— Ruth Yarrow

The following demonstrates how a line-break can be used to create the cut,

beam by beam
the old barn taken down
to sky

— Peter Newton

=== Juxtaposition and Disjunction ===
Cutting a haiku creates a juxtaposition between images, ideas, and moments, or rather the poetic technique of juxtaposition creates the cut. Haiku written in the traditional Japanese haiku construction contain two parts juxtaposed with each other. The two juxtaposed components are fundamentally different and independent of each other, and each part represents a different topic, idea, or subject. The cut of the juxtaposed components create a tension or “spark” in haiku.

English-language haiku approaches the nature of juxtaposition differently from traditional Japanese haiku. In his essay The Disjunctive Dragonfly, haiku theorist Richard Gilbert applies the concept of disjunction, a literary effect common in poetry, to English-language haiku. Gilbert notes while disjunction is a general feature of poetry, it functions more intensely in haiku than in other forms of poetry due to haiku's brevity and fragmentary form. In ELH, it is the force of disjunction, rather than merely the technique of juxtaposition, that is the "source of creative tension" in haiku. The concept of disjunction offers a broader and more dynamic framework than the traditional concept of juxtaposition in ELH poetics.

Gilbert defines disjunction as the "root-semantico-linguistic principle impelling juxtaposition, superposition, possessing multiple types, each related to specific poetic and formal functions and techniques which irrupt habitual consciousness and concept; may supervene more traditional functional stylism, such as fragment/phrase, juxtapositional dualism, kireji....[and] has at least three dimensions of velocity: centrifugal force (the reader is thrown out of the poem and image, even out of language); gravitational force (the reader is drawn into interior contemplation); and, misreading as meaning (a falling out of, and recovery of, meaning)."

Gilbert argues that juxtaposition alone "does not intrinsically provide poetic power," suggesting instead that the reader’s experience of disruption — namely, disjunction—is what truly animates a haiku. He writes, “The force of disjunction acting on the reader’s consciousness is the primary motif,” noting that in the absence of disjunction, "the sense of poetry is lost."

Discussing how disjunction operates in ELH, haiku scholar William H. Ramsey writes, “More frequently than other literary forms, haiku assaults or subverts a reader’s customary grammatical expectations when, through semantic distortion, the text shifts into a peculiar direction. In that split-second disjunctive 'gap, where one loses comprehension of what has just been read, a new reading must be performed arising with altered consciousness."

Disjunction can be generated via the traditional poetic technique of juxtaposition, but other techniques such as semantic paradox, imagistic or metaphoric fusion, misplaced anthropomorphism can be used.

Some examples of English-language haiku that do not contain a traditional juxtaposition of two components, yet operate within disjunction include,

even, if, because
plum blossoms
in the courtyard

— Miriam Saga

the river
the river makes
of the moon

— Jim Kacian

dark star in the ultrasound image her tiny fist

— Lorin Ford

deep snow,
in a dream, I find
her password in

— Mark Harris

Gilbert formulated the concept of disjunction to offer a richer analytical approach for contemporary English-language haiku, especially those that do not adhere to classical conventions like nature imagery, kigo (season words), or traditional two-part juxtaposition.

=== Seasonality and Keywords ===
In traditional Japanese haiku a kigo (季語; 'season word') functions as a seasonal marker, indicating not only the time of year but also conveying emotional, cultural, and aesthetic resonance. Common examples include natural elements such as “plum blossoms” (spring), “cicadas” (summer), or “autumn wind” (fall). Each kigo carries with it centuries of literary and cultural significance, allowing a short poem like a haiku to resonate with broader themes and shared cultural memory; the “seasonal word... anchors the poem in not only some aspect of nature but in the vertical axis, in a larger communal body of poetic and cultural associations." Lists of kigo, called saijiki, have been compiled over the centuries.

However, the concept of kigo, the deeply rooted cultural and literary seasonal marker does not translate easily into English, for the “connotations of seasonal words differ greatly from region to region in North America, not to mention other parts of the world, and generally are not tied to specific literary or cultural associations that would be immediately recognized by the reader.” Various English-language haiku scholars have attempted to recreate the culturally enriched kigo concept in English, generating various North America lists of seasonal words. Notable examples include, William J. Higginson’s Haiku World: An International Poetry Almanac. Kodansha International, Jane Reichhold’s A Dictionary of Haiku Classified by Season Words with Traditional and Modern Methods, and the California based Yuki Teikei Haiku Society’s San Francisco Bay Area Nature Guide and Saijiki.

To address the challenges of translating the concept of kigo, ELH can include the incorporation of keywords. Keywords are conceived as words or phrases that, like kigo, evoke shared experiences and emotional resonances, but are not limited to seasonal references. Kigo are a particular subset of keyword, namely a seasonal keyword, however other subsets of keywords exist that "possess symbolic meaning," for a particular culture, for "surely all cultures are certain to possess symbolic keywords that are unique to them, and which have been nurtured throughout their history." Keywords may include kigo but also encompass a wider range of imagery and associations. Like kigo, keywords "codify our experiences, provide a shorthand for expressing them, and unify our writings through association with other expressions in the form.".

An example of a keyword is the following haiku,

moonlight
river divides the forest
into two nights

— Nikola Nilic

This haiku may not have a specific seasonal attribution, yet the word “moonlight” functions as a keyword—evoking atmosphere and emotional tone without relying on a traditional season word. Under this approach, season words are seen as a significant subset of keywords, but not the only means by which haiku can achieve depth and resonance.

=== Diction ===
Traditional Japanese haiku was composed with various levels of diction. In his work, Traces of Dreams: Landscape, Cultural Memory, and the Poetry of Basho, Haruo Shirane writes that haikai poetry combined the "elegant, aristocratic forms of traditional literature" with the common vernacular of "popular, vulgar, or erotic content." As well, Hiroaki Sato, in his work On Haiku, notes the effect of haiku results from “superimposing new, quotidian images onto more elegant ones.” Elaborating on the two levels of diction, Kōji Kawamoto, in his The Poetics of Japanese Verse: Imagery, Structure, Meter, notes that the first level of diction was an "elegant poetic diction", referred to as waka diction, a “highly restricted lexicon of words which could be used in waka poems.” The second level was common, everyday language, or haikai diction, which “referred to all terms outside the restricted body of allowable waka words," and could include "colloquialisms [and] contemporary terms." As such, traditional Japanese haiku was "founded upon a delicate balance between styles of classical elegance and common vulgarity...a reciprocating movement between the two different classes of words...it entailed the action and counter-action taking place between 'everyday colloquialisms current in society' and 'codified, elegant words belonging to classical literature.' (i.e., waka diction)" Like Sato, Kawamoto notes the effect of a haiku was "created by the juxtaposition of colloquialisms and elegant poetic diction [which] was the heart and soul of haikai."

English-language haiku however does not incorporate the traditional "synthesis of elegant and everyday language." The diction of ELH has undergone a notable transformation since its early 20th-century beginnings. Initially, ELH scholars and poets popularized the notion that English-language haiku were composed of “simple words,” that its diction was "simple and direct," and that it employed “common language,” As such ELH writers should avoid "high-falootin’ talk" and any diction "intended to make their poem lyrical or pretty."

This approach of a simple, common vocabulary was popularized further during the Beat era, with writers like Jack Kerouac adopting and promoting a language simplicity —as he stated, a "haiku must be very simple and free of all poetic trickery." This simplicity of diction was called “wordless poetry” by Alan Watts and haiku scholar and poet Cor van de Heuvel writes, "haiku, for the reader, is wordless because those few words are invisible. We as readers look right through them." This transparent notion of language was popular for much of the 20th century.

Moving into the latter decades of the 20th century and into the 21st century, English-language haiku began to embrace approaches highlighting the "opaque materiality of language as a medium, as against a 'romantic' view of language as purely a transparent window." In the introduction to Haiku 21: an anthology of contemporary English-language haiku, the editors note "what is most different about English-language haiku today is its different relationship with language." The ideal of a simple, transparent language has shifted in 21st century ELH. Transparency in diction has been challenged by a concept of haiku in which "the language is more opaque, in which, in fact, the opacity of language is itself held forth as an ideal." This shift reflects a balance between traditionalist minimalism—valuing clarity and restraint—and innovative approaches, such as haiku that include, "surrealist techniques and figurative expression," as well "eroticism, psychological expression, and political and social commentary."

== History ==
=== First appearances ===
According to Charles Trumbull, the first haiku printed in English were three translations included in the second edition of William George Aston's A Grammar of the Japanese Written Language (1877). Aston's A History of Japanese Literature, first published in 1899 and a major reference source for early 20th-century poets, also described the "haikai" poetic form.

=== Britain and Australia ===
The first haiku composed in English, at least in form, were written in response to haiku contests. In Britain, the editors of The Academy announced the first known English-language haikai contest on April 8, 1899, shortly after the publication of William George Aston's History of Japanese Literature. The Academy contest inspired other experimentation with the format. Bertram Dobell published more than a dozen haikai in a 1901 verse collection, and in 1903 a group of Cambridge poets, citing Dobell as precedent, published their haikai series, "The Water Party." The Academy's influence was felt as far away as Australia, where editor Alfred Stephens was inspired to conduct a similar contest in the pages of The Bulletin. The prize for this (possibly first Australian) haiku contest went to Robert Crawford.

=== American writers ===
Ezra Pound's influential haiku-influenced poem, "In a Station of the Metro", published in 1913, was the "first fully realized haiku in English," according to the editors of Haiku in English: The First Hundred Years. In his essay "Vorticism," Pound acknowledged that Japanese poetry, especially hokku (the linked verse poem that haiku is derived from), was a significant influence on his poetry. It is likely that he first encountered Japanese poetry in the Poets' Club with T. E. Hulme and F. S. Flint around 1912. In the essay, Pound described how he wrote a 30-line poem about the experience of exiting a metro train and seeing many beautiful faces. Two years later, he had reduced it to a single sentence in the poem In a Station of the Metro:

The apparition of these faces in a crowd;
Petals on a wet, black bough.

— Ezra Pound, "Vorticism", September 1914

Pound wrote that representing his experience as an image made it "a thing inward and subjective".

In the United States, Yone Noguchi published "A Proposal to American Poets," in The Reader Magazine in February 1904, giving a brief outline of his own English hokku efforts and ending with the exhortation, "Pray, you try Japanese Hokku, my American poets! You say far too much, I should say." Noguchi was a bilingual poet writing in Japanese and English who was acquainted with Pound. He published an essay called "What Is a Hokku Poem" (1913) where he wrote that a hokku was an expression of longing toward nature that is "never mystified by any cloud or mist like Truth or Beauty". He encouraged an objective standpoint by referring to Zen philosophy, which sees good and evil as human inventions. Noguchi published his own volume of English-language Japanese Hokkus in 1920 and dedicated it to Yeats. During the Imagist period, a number of mainstream poets, including Richard Aldington, and F. S. Flint published what were generally called hokku, although critic Yoshinobu Hakutani wrote that compared to Pound and Noguchi, these were "labored, superficial imitators."

=== Postwar revival ===
==== Significant poets ====
In the Beat period, original haiku were composed by Diane di Prima, Gary Snyder, and Jack Kerouac. Kerouac became interested in Buddhism from reading Thoreau, and he studied Mahayana Buddhism and Zen Buddhism in conjunction with his work writing The Dharma Bums. As part of these studies, Kerouac referenced R. H. Blyth's four-volume Haiku series, which included a volume on Eastern culture.

Richard Wright's interest in haiku began in 1959 when he learned about the form from beat poet Sinclair Beiles in South Africa. Wright studied the four-volume series by Blyth as well as other books on Zen Buddhism. He composed some 4,000 haiku between 1959 and 1960 during an illness and reduced them to 817 for a collection which was published posthumously. His haiku show an attention to the Zen qualities present in the haiku he read as models.

Whitecaps on the bay:
A broken signboard banging
In the April wind.

— Richard Wright, collected in Haiku: This Other World, 1998

James W. Hackett is another influential haiku poet from this time period who agreed with Blyth that Zen was an essential element of haiku. Charles Trumbell wrote that in the mid-1960s, "his haiku were unquestionably among the best being written outside Japan". Hackett corresponded with Blyth for advice and encouragement in composing haiku, and Blyth promoted Hackett's poetry in his own work. Subsequent haiku poets did not insist as strongly on the connection of Zen with haiku. Haiku scholar Kōji Kawamoto writes, “Most of the postwar beat generation and subsequent haiku poets first came to haiku and developed their interest in this literary genre mainly by way of Zen. In actuality, this manner of assimilating the haiku is no more than the manifestation of a form of fascination with something foreign and exotic and may even be seen as having corrupted a more accurate picture of haiku.”

Pulitzer Prize winning poet W.H. Auden wrote a number of haiku throughout his career, exploring the form's structure and meditative qualities. English poet John Fuller, in his work W. H. Auden: a Commentary, writes the "discovery of the haiku...was clearly liberating for Auden." Auden's 1964 series of haiku, Elegy for J.F.K., commemorating the assassination of U.S. President John F. Kennedy, were set to music by Igor Stravinsky.

The first English-language haiku group in America, founded in 1956, was the Writers' Roundtable of Los Altos, California, under the direction of Helen Stiles Chenoweth. They also studied the Blyth collection, as well as an anthology translated by Asatarou Miyamori, The Hollow Reed (1935) by Mary J.J. Wrinn, and Haikai and Haiku (1958) among others. The group published an anthology in 1966 called Borrowed Water.

==== Publications ====
In 1963 the magazine American Haiku was founded in Platteville, Wisconsin, edited by James Bull and Donald Eulert. Among contributors to the magazine were poets James W. Hackett, O Mabson Southard, Nick Virgilio, Helen Chenoweth, and Gustave Keyser. Other co-editors included Clement Hoyt (1964), Harold Henderson (1964), and Robert Spiess (1966). In the second issue of American Haiku Virgilio published his "lily" and "bass" haiku, which became models of brevity, breaking the conventional 5-7-5 syllabic form, and pointing toward the leaner conception of haiku. The magazine established haiku as a form worthy of a new aesthetic sense in poetry.

The Haiku Society of America was founded in 1968 and began publishing its journal Frogpond in 1978. In 1972, Lorraine Ellis Harr founded the Western World Haiku Society.

American Haiku ended publication in 1968; Modern Haiku published its first issue in 1969. Haiku Highlights, was founded 1965 by European-American writer Jean Calkins and later taken over by Lorraine Ellis Harr and renamed Dragonfly: A Quarterly of Haiku (1972-1984). Eric Amann published Haiku (1967-1970) and Cicada (1977-1982) in Canada. Cicada included one-line haiku and tanka. Leroy Kanterman edited Haiku West (1967-1975).

The first Haiku North America conference was held at Las Positas College in Livermore, California, in 1991, and has been held on alternating years since then. The American Haiku Archives, the largest public archive of haiku-related material outside Japan, was founded in 1996. It is housed at the California State Library in Sacramento, California, and includes the official archives of the Haiku Society of America.

== Publications in North America ==
English-language haiku journals published in the U.S. include Modern Haiku, Frogpond (published by the Haiku Society of America), Mayfly (founded by Randy and Shirley Brooks in 1986), Acorn (founded by A. C. Missias in 1998), Bottle Rockets (founded by Stanford M. Forrester), The Heron's Nest (founded by Christopher Herold in 1999, published online with a print annual), Tinywords (founded by Dylan F. Tweney in 2001). Some significant defunct publications include Brussels Sprout (edited from 1988 to 1995 by Francine Porad), Woodnotes (edited from 1989 to 1997 by Michael Dylan Welch), Hal Roth's Wind Chimes, and Wisteria.

== Publications in other English-speaking countries ==
In the United Kingdom, publications of Haiku include Presence (formerly Haiku Presence), which was edited for many years by Martin Lucas and is now edited by Ian Storr, and Blithe Spirit, published by the British Haiku Society and named in honor of Reginald Horace Blyth. In Ireland, twenty issues of Haiku Spirit edited by Jim Norton were published between 1995 and 2000, and Shamrock, an online journal edited by Anatoly Kudryavitsky, published international haiku in English from 2007 to 2022. In Australia, twenty issues of Yellow Moon, a literary magazine for writers of haiku and other verse, were published between 1997 and 2006; Paper Wasp was published in Australia until 2016. Echidna Tracks is a biannual Australian haiku publication. Kokako is the journal of the New Zealand Poetry Society and Chrysanthemum (bilingual German/English) in Germany and Austria. Two other online English-language haiku journals founded outside North America, A Hundred Gourds and Notes from the Gean, are now defunct. John Barlow's Snapshot Press is a UK-based publisher of haiku books. The World Haiku Club publishes The World Haiku Review.

== Notable English-language haiku poets ==
- Lewis Grandison Alexander
- John Brandi
- Reginald Horace Blyth
- Ross Clark
- Robbie Coburn
- Billy Collins
- Cid Corman
- Tyler Knott Gregson
- Lee Gurga
- James William Hackett
- William J. Higginson
- Jim Kacian
- Jack Kerouac
- James Kirkup
- Etheridge Knight
- Anatoly Kudryavitsky
- Elizabeth Searle Lamb
- Lenard D. Moore
- Marlene Mountain
- John Richard Parsons
- Alan Pizzarelli
- Paul Reps
- Kenneth Rexroth
- Raymond Roseliep
- Alexis Rotella
- Gabriel Rosenstock
- Sonia Sanchez
- Gary Snyder
- George Swede
- Wally Swist
- Cor van den Heuvel
- Nick Virgilio
- Gerald Vizenor
- Paul O. Williams
- Richard Wright

== See also ==
- Haiku
- Renku
- Senryū
- Cinquain
- Monostich
- Verbless poetry
- Micropoetry
- Scifaiku
- Zappai
- Masaoka Shiki International Haiku Awards
- Haiku Society of America (HSA)
- Reginald Horace Blyth
- British Haiku Society

== Works cited ==
- Gilbert, Richard (2008). Poems of Consciousness: Contemporary Japanese and English-language Haiku in Cross-study Perspectives. Red Moon Press.ISBN 978-1893959729
- Hakutani, Yoshinobu (2022). "Haiku, Ezra Pound, and Imagism". In Kiuchi, Toru; Hakutani, Yoshinobu (eds.). Haiku, Other Arts, and Literary Disciplines. Lexington Books. ISBN 9781793647207.
- Hakutani, Yoshinobu (2022). "Jack Kerouac's Haiku and the Beat Generation". In Kiuchi, Toru; Hakutani, Yoshinobu (eds.). Haiku, Other Arts, and Literary Disciplines. Lexington Books. ISBN 9781793647207.
- Higginson, William J. (1985). The Haiku Handbook: How to Write, Share, and Teach Haiku. McGraw-Hill Book Company. ISBN 0070287864.
- Kacian, Jim; Rowland, Philip; Burns, Allan, eds. (2013). Haiku in English: The First Hundred Years. W. W. Norton and Company. ISBN 9780393239478.
- Kiuchi, Toru (2022). "Richard Wright's Haiku and Zen Buddhism". In Kiuchi, Toru; Hakutani, Yoshinobu (eds.). Haiku, Other Arts, and Literary Disciplines. Lexington Books. ISBN 9781793647207.
- Miner, Earl (1957). "Pound, Haiku and the Image". The Hudson Review. 9 (4): 570–584. ISSN 0018-702X. JSTOR 4621630.
- Rosenow, Ce (2022). "American Haiku in the New Millenium". In Kiuchi, Toru; Hakutani, Yoshinobu (eds.). Haiku, Other Arts, and Literary Disciplines. Lexington Books. ISBN 9781793647207.
- Sato, Hiroaki (2023). "Hearn, Bickerton, Hubbell: Translation and Definition". In Shea, James; Caldwell, Grant (eds.). The Routledge global haiku reader. Abingdon, Oxon; New York, NY: Routledge. pp. 31–35. ISBN 9781032272658.
