= Swist (surname) =

Swist or Świst is a surname. It may refer to:

- Piotr Świst (born 1968), Polish speedway rider
- Tomasz Świst (born 1974), Polish speed skater
- Wally Swist (born 1953), American poet and writer
