= Zappai =

Form of Japanese poetry rooted in haikai

Zappai (雑俳) is a form of Japanese poetry rooted in haikai. It is related to, but separate from, haiku and senryū. Lee Gurga defines zappai as a form of poetry that "includes all types of seventeen syllable poems that do not have the proper formal or technical characteristics of haiku." The Haiku Society of America mentioned zappai while defining similar forms though their comments were later rebutted by Richard Gilbert and Shinjuku Rollingstone.

== See also ==
- haiku
- senryū
