= Nick Virgilio =

American poet

- Born: Nicholas Anthony Virgilio; June 28, 1928; Camden, New Jersey, U.S.
- Died: January 3, 1989 (aged 60); Washington, D.C., U.S.
- Education: Temple University (BA)
- Style: Haiku
- Website: www.nickvirgiliohaiku.org

Nicholas Anthony Virgilio (June 28, 1928 – January 3, 1989) was an internationally recognized haiku poet who is credited with helping to popularize the Japanese style of poetry in the United States.

== Early life ==
Virgilio was born in Camden, New Jersey on June 28, 1928, the first of three sons of Anthony Virgilio, an accomplished violinist, and Rose Alemi, a seamstress. He grew up in the city's Fairview section, where he lived much of his life.

He graduated from Camden High School, served in the Navy during World War II, received a Bachelor of Arts degree from Temple University in Philadelphia, and began his career as a radio announcer and, as "Nickaphonic Nick", worked as a disc jockey with Philadelphia's Jerry Blavat. He moved to Texas in the late 1950s to become a sports broadcaster.

== Haiku ==
Virgilio moved back to Camden following a bad love affair in Texas and discovered haiku in 1962 in a book he found at the library at Rutgers University-Camden. His first published haiku appeared in American Haiku magazine in 1963, and he wrote thousands, many unpublished, during his 20-plus-year career. The death of his youngest brother Larry in the Vietnam War inspired some poignant and powerful haiku, and made his reputation as a haiku elegist. He is quoted by haiku author and book editor Cor van den Heuvel as saying he wrote haiku "to get in touch with the real".

my dead brother...
hearing his laugh
in my laughter

Virgilio experimented with the haiku form, trying several innovations that other American haiku poets were exploring, including dropping the traditional 5-7-5 syllable count in favor of shorter forms. He sometimes included rhyme in his haiku along with the gritty reality of urban America. A collection of his selected haiku was published in 1985. The second (expanded) edition appeared just months before his death. Writing for Haikupedia, Geoffrey Sill wrote that Virgilio is "considered a founder of haiku written in the American idiom."

Virgilio became well known after a review on National Public Radio, and appeared often on that network as a guest commentator. He was a member of Camden's Sacred Heart Church and helped to found the Walt Whitman Center for the Arts and Humanities (now the Cooper Library in Johnson Park), where he also served as its artistic director and poet-in-residence. Virgilio was a long-standing member of the Haiku Society of America and was the co-director of the First International Haiku Festival, held in 1971 in Philadelphia.

While Virgilio's classic collection, Selected Haiku, is out of print, Turtle Light Press published a volume in 2012 -- Nick Virgilio: A Life in Haiku—that features 30 of Virgilio's classic haiku, 100 previously unpublished poems, two of his essays on the art of haiku, an interview with him on Marty Moss-Coane's WHYY show, "Radio Times," a tribute by Michael Doyle, family photos and reproductions of some of his original manuscript pages. As Virgilio said in his interview with Moss-Coane on "Radio Times," "I try to make my life count for something. We all have these tragic experiences, and life basically is tragic, nobody lives happily ever after. So what I hope to do is to uplift it and bring it into the realm of beauty." In 2023, Red Moon Press published Nick Virgilio: Collected Haiku 1963-2012, edited by Geoffrey Sill, which includes some posthumously published poems in addition to all of the haiku Virgilio published during his lifetime.

Until his death, Virgilio had a program on WKDN-FM, a radio station in Camden, NJ.

== Death ==
On January 3, 1989, Virgilio had a heart attack while taping an interview about haiku for CBS News Nightwatch. He died at George Washington University Medical Center. He is buried at Harleigh Cemetery in Camden. His well-known "Lily" haiku is engraved upon his gravestone:

lily:
out of the water . . .
out of itself

Virgilio's papers are housed at the Paul Robeson Library at Rutgers University-Camden.

== Bibliography ==
- Selected Haiku
- Nick Virgilio: A Life in Haiku
- Nick Virgilio: Collected Haiku 1963-2012
