= Haibun =

Literary form originating in Japan, combining prose and haiku

Haibun (俳文; literally, haikai writings) is a prosimetric literary form originating in Japan, combining prose and haiku. The range of haibun is broad and frequently includes autobiography, diary, essay, prose poem, short story and travel journal.

== History ==
The term "haibun" was first used by the 17th-century Japanese poet Matsuo Bashō, in a letter to his disciple Kyorai in 1690. Bashō was a prominent early writer of haibun, then a new genre combining classical prototypes, Chinese prose genres and vernacular subject matter and language. He wrote some haibun as travel accounts during his various journeys, the most famous of which is Oku no Hosomichi (Narrow Road to the Interior).

Bashō's shorter haibun include compositions devoted to travel and others focusing on character sketches, landscape scenes, anecdotal vignettes and occasional writings written to honor a specific patron or event. His Hut of the Phantom Dwelling can be classified as an essay while, in Saga Nikki (Saga Diary), he documents his day-to-day activities with his disciples on a summer retreat.

Traditional haibun typically took the form of a short description of a place, person or object, or a diary of a journey or other series of events in the poet's life. Haibun continued to be written by later haikai poets such as Yosa Buson, Kobayashi Issa and Masaoka Shiki.

== In English ==
Haibun is no longer confined to Japan, and has established itself as a genre in world literature that has gained momentum in recent years.

In the Haiku Society of America 25th anniversary book of its history, A Haiku Path, Elizabeth Lamb noted that the first English-language haibun, titled "Paris," was published in 1964 by Canadian writer Jack Cain. However, an earlier example is Carolyn Kizer's "A Month in Summer," an extended haibun with 21 haiku and one tanka, published in 1962. Her piece (identified as a haibun) first appeared in Kenyon Review.

James Merrill's "Prose of Departure", from The Inner Room (1988), is a later example. John Ashbery also included several experiments with haibun in his 1984 collection A Wave.

The first contest for English-language haibun took place in 1996, organized by poet and editor Michael Dylan Welch, and judged by Tom Lynch and Cor van den Heuvel. Anita Virgil won first prize, and honorable mentions (in alphabetical order) went to Sydney Bougy, David Cobb, and John Stevenson. The contest resulted in the publication of Wedge of Light (Press Here) in 1999. As credited by Welch, the first anthology of English-language haibun was Bruce Ross's Journey to the Interior: American Versions of Haibun (Tuttle), published in 1998.

Jim Kacian and Bruce Ross edited the inaugural number of the annual anthology American Haibun & Haiga (Red Moon Press) in 1999; that series, which continues to this day, changed its name to Contemporary Haibun in 2003 and sponsored the parallel creation in 2005 of Contemporary Haibun Online, a quarterly journal that added Welsh haibun author Ken Jones to the founding editorial team of Kacian and Ross.

== Characteristics ==
A haibun may record a scene, or a special moment, in a highly descriptive and objective manner or may occupy a wholly fictional or dream-like space. The accompanying haiku may have a direct or subtle relationship with the prose and encompass or hint at the gist of what is recorded in the prose sections.

Several distinct schools of English haibun have been described, including Reportage narrative mode such as Robert Wilson's Vietnam Ruminations, Haibunic prose, and the Templum effect.

Contemporary practice of haibun composition in English is continually evolving. Generally, a haibun consists of one or more paragraphs of prose written in a concise, imagistic haikai style, and one or more haiku. However, there may be considerable variation of form, as described by editor and practitioner Jeffrey Woodward.

Modern English-language haibun writers (aka, practitioners) include Jim Kacian, Bruce Ross, Mark Nowak, John Richard Parsons, Sheila Murphy, Roberta Beary, Lew Watts, Rich Youmans (these last three the authors of Haibun: A Writer's Guide), Nobuyuki Yuasa, Lynne Reese, Peter Butler, Eve Kosofsky Sedgwick, and David Cobb, founder of the British Haiku Society in 1990 and author of Spring Journey to the Saxon Shore, a 5,000-word haibun which has been considered seminal for the English form of kikōbun (i.e., travel diary).

== See also ==
- Matsuo Bashō
- Oku no Hosomichi (The Narrow Road to the Interior) – an example of extended Haibun.
