= Detrick Hughes =

American poet (born 1966)

Detrick Oliver Hughes
- Hughes, c. 2010
- Born: December 13, 1966 (age 59); Beaumont, Texas, United States
- Education: University of Houston; Ashland University
- Occupations: Poet, author
- Website: www.detrickhughes.com

Detrick Oliver Hughes (born December 13, 1966) is an American poet and spoken-word artist. Hughes is known for urban commentary and life expressions offered via the genre of poetry. His latest book Unsuitable for Fools was published April 21, 2020 by Nebo Media Group.

== Personal life ==
Hughes was born and raised in Beaumont, Texas, which is close to the Louisiana border. In high school, he played football and was active in student government. He graduated from French High School in 1985 where his football team captured a share of the 5A state championship with Odessa's Permian High School in 1984.

Upon graduating from French, Hughes entered the University of Houston in Houston, Texas where he received a degree in Finance. While at the University of Houston, he joined the Alpha Phi Alpha fraternity. He later received a Master of Fine Arts degree from Ashland University in Ashland, Ohio.

== Publications ==
- Unsuitable for Fools, Nebo Media Group, 2020
- Disturbing the Piece, Nebo Media Group, 2018
- Goats Do Roman Villages, Nebo Media Group, 2016
- Sugar-Tooth Confession, Nebo Media Group, 2012
- I Am Poet, Storybookx, 2009
- Chocolate Covered Raisins, Storybookx, 1995
- Paper Walls, Storybookx, 1994

== Audio recordings ==
- Cottonwood Park, 2005
- The Sound of One Voice Marching, 1999
