= William Morrell (poet) =

The Reverend William Morrell (fl. 1625) was a British Anglican clergyman and early American poet.

Morrell went to Massachusetts in 1623 with the company sent out by the Plymouth council, under the command of Captain Robert Gorges, son of Sir Ferdinando Gorges. He bore a commission from the ecclesiastical court to exercise superintendence over the churches that were, or might be, established in a colony. The attempt by this company to form a settlement at Wessagusset Colony (now Weymouth) was unsuccessful. After Gorges's departure Rev Morrell remained a year at Plymouth out of curiosity to learn something of the country, but made no use of his commission, nor even mentioned it until just before he sailed for England.

He wrought the result of his observations into some elegant Latin hexameters, which he translated into English heroic verse, and published under the title of New-England, or a briefe Enarration of the Ayre, Earth, Water, Fish, and Fowles of that Country. With a Description of the. . .Habits and Religion of the Natives, in Latine and English Verse, 4to, London, 1625. The English version, which is frequently harsh and obscure, is preceded by a poetical address to the king. A copy of this rare tract, which is dedicated to the lords, knights, and gentlemen, adventurers for New England, is in the British Museum; it was reprinted in 1792 in the Collections of the Massachusetts Historical Society, 1st ser. vol. i. pp. 125–39. In a postscript Morrell announced his intention of publishing another book on New England.

== Notes ==
This article incorporates text from a publication now in the public domain: "Morrell, William". Dictionary of National Biography. London: Smith, Elder & Co. 1885–1900.
