= Jim Kacian =

American poet

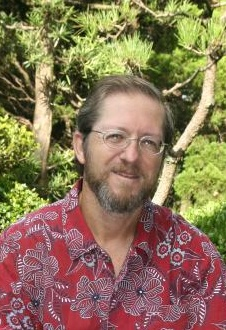
Jim Kacian in Kumamoto, Japan, in mid-September 2007, while reading his haiku for a film in development by Slovenian filmmaker Dimitar Anakiev.

James Michael Kacian (born July 26, 1953) is an American haiku poet, editor, translator, publisher, organizer, filmmaker, public speaker, and theorist. He has authored more than 20 volumes of English-language haiku, and edited scores more, including serving as editor-in-chief for Haiku in English: The First Hundred Years. In addition, he is founder and owner of Red Moon Press (1993), a co-founder of the World Haiku Association (2000), and founder and president of The Haiku Foundation (2009).

== Early life and career ==
James Michael Kacian was born in Worcester, Massachusetts. He was later adopted and raised in Gardner, Massachusetts. He wrote his first mainstream poems in his teens and published them in small poetry magazines beginning in 1970. He also wrote, recorded, and sold songs under the name Jim Blake while living in Nashville in the 1980s. Upon his move to Virginia in 1985 he discovered English-language haiku, for which he is best known.

He set himself the task of writing a thousand such poems before seeking publication, and between 1985 and 1987 accomplished this. Since 1988 he has published thousands of his poems in hundreds of locations in dozens of languages, with the preponderance of them being published in the United States, but with substantial numbers also appearing in Canada, the United Kingdom, Sweden, France, Netherlands, Germany, Poland, Italy, Austria, Israel, Croatia, Serbia, Slovenia, Bulgaria, Hungary, Romania, Macedonia, Greece, Iran, Russia, China, India, Australia, New Zealand and Japan.

From 1993 – 1998 he edited the haiku journal, which he followed (1998 – 2004) by assuming the editorship of Frogpond, the membership journal of the Haiku Society of America.

Also in 1993, Kacian founded Red Moon Press.

Since 1996, Kacian has published more than 20 books, primarily haiku, and his work has been translated into more than 20 languages. His poems have won or been placed in virtually every international contest in the genre. All of his full-length collections have won awards.

Having proposed a new global haiku association in 1999, Kacian co-founded the World Haiku Association with Ban'ya Natsuishi and Dimitar Anakiev. In September 2000 the WHA held its inaugural conference in Tolmin, Slovenia.

From August to November 2000, Kacian traveled to nine countries — the UK, Slovenia, Macedonia, Bulgaria, Romania, Malaysia, New Zealand, Australia, and Japan promoting a global haiku. Having invited haiku poets from around the world to submit their haiku to Frogpond, Kacian compiled and edited 2001's XXIV:1 issue, featuring haiku from 24 countries.

Beginning in 2004, Kacian began work on The Haiku Foundation. Among its offerings are The Haiku Foundation Libraries (hard copy and digital); Haikupedia, the online encyclopedia of all things haiku; interactive features; a history of world haiku, with specimen samples, in original languages and English; and more.

In August 2013, his anthology Haiku in English: The First Hundred Years was published by W. W. Norton & Company. The anthology tells the story of English-language haiku from its inception to the present, and includes his 70-page overview of the genre.

Also in 2013, Kacian created the first video haiga and haiku film. He first presented them publicly via The Haiku Foundation website, and then collectively at the HaikuLife Haiku Film Festival which he inaugurated in 2015.

== Poetry collections ==
Kacian has written sixteen books of poetry, fourteen of which are dedicated to haiku or haiku-related genres. His poems have been translated into many languages.

== Featured work ==
Kacian's haiku,

clouds seen
through clouds
seen through

(along with 29 other chosen haiku) is etched in a stone along the Katikati Haiku Pathway beside the Uretara Stream in New Zealand. (Poems were selected by the Katikati Haiku Pathway Focus Committee, New Zealand Poetry Society, and Catherine Mair.) In 2010 a second stone featuring his poem

a breeze and my mind on to other things

was added, making him one of only three poets with multiple stones, and the only American.

James Michael Kacian's essays have been cited in such works as:

- Rowland, Philip (Autumn 2008). "From Haiku to the Short Poem: Bridging the divide". Modern Haiku 39(3), pp. 23–45, ISSN 0026-7821
- Yovu, Peter (Winter 2008). "Do Something Different". Frogpond XXXI, pp. 51–61, ISSN 8755-156X

Kacian's efforts on behalf of global haiku have been featured in Global Haiku and the work of Jim Kacian (Richard Gilbert, 2003).

Kacian's work has been anthologized in, among others:

- The Haiku Anthology, 3rd edition (Cor van den Heuvel) Norton, 1999 ISBN 0-393-04743-1
- Haiku Moment (ed. Bruce Ross) Tuttle, 1993, ISBN 0 8048 1820 7
- Haiku World: An International Poetry Almanac (ed. William J. Higginson)
- The New Haiku (eds. John Barlow & Martin Lucas)
- Haiku Mind (ed. Patricia Donegan)
- Journey to the Interior: American Versions of Haibun (ed. Bruce Ross)
- How to Haiku (Bruce Ross)
- Haiku: A Poet's Guide (Lee Gurga)
- Baseball Haiku (ed. Cor van den Heuvel)
- Haiku: Poetry Ancient & Modern (ed. Jackie Hardy) (also German and French editions)
- Haiku International Anthology (ed. Ban’ya Natsuishi)
- Poems of Consciousness (Richard Gilbert) Red Moon Press 2008 ISBN 978-1893959729
- Haiku in English: The First Hundred Years (ed. Jim Kacian, Allan Burns & Philip Rowland) W. W. Norton & Company, 2013

His poem,

my fingerprints
on the dragonfly
in amber

serves as the departure point for Richard Gilbert's monograph on contemporary haiku technique, The Disjunctive Dragonfly, defining innovative techniques in English-language haiku.

== Editorship ==
Kacian has edited several English-language haiku books and journals, including:

- A New Resonance: Emerging Voices in English-language Haiku (series), 1999–present
- Contemporary Haibun (series), 1999–present
- Red Moon Anthology of English-language Haiku (series), 1996–present
- Frogpond, the journal of the Haiku Society of America, 1998 to 2004
- A Dozen Tongues (series) (vols. 1 & 2), 2000–2001
- Knots: The Anthology of Southeast European Haiku Poetry (with Dimitar Anakiev), 1999
- South by Southeast from 1993 to 1998
- Haiku in English: The First Hundred Years (with Allan Burns and Philip Rowland), 2013

== Awards ==
=== As a poet ===
Kacian's haiku have won or placed in many national and international haiku competitions in English (and occasionally other languages as well), including recently:

- Vladimir Devidé Haiku Grand Prize (Japan, Librasia 2011)
- The Kusamakura International Haiku Competition (Japan, 2008)
- The Winter Moon International Haiku Competition (2008)
- Cascina Macondo Concorso Internazionale de Poesia Haiku in Lingua Italiana 5a Edizione (Italy, 2007)
- The 17th Ito-En Haiku Competition Judge's Award (Japan, 2007)
- The Hawai’i Education Association Haiku Competition (2007)
- The Harold G. Henderson Haiku Competition Prize (Haiku Society of America) (2005)
- The British Haiku Society James W. Hackett International Haiku Award (2001)
- Betty Drevniok (Haiku Canada (2000, 2001, 2002, 2008)
- Poem of the Year, The Heron's Nest, 2009, 2010 & 2012

=== Individual collection awards ===
The books listed below have won The Haiku Society of America Merit Book Awards for outstanding achievement in the genre.

- Long After
- Presents of Mind
- Six Directions: Haiku and Field Notes
- Border Lands
- after/image

=== As a publisher ===
In 1996 his production of John Elsberg's A Week in the Lake District was a finalist for Virginia Poetry Book of the Year (Virginia State Library).

In August 2000, Knots — The Anthology of Southeastern European Haiku Poetry (1999), which Kacian co-edited with Dimitar Anakiev, won second place in the World Haiku Achievement Competition.

In October 2008 he won the Ginyu Award for Outstanding Contribution to World Haiku (Ginyu issue 40, pp. 13–15).

== Publication credits ==
Kacian's poems, articles, and book reviews have appeared internationally in journals, magazines, and newspapers including:

- Frogpond
- The Heron’s Nest
- Ant Ant Ant Ant Ant
- Simply Haiku
- Modern Haiku
- The Haiku Canada Newsletter
- Acorn
- tinywords

== Speeches ==
Kacian has read in many parts of the world, including international poetry festivals in New York, New Orleans, London, Oxford, Belgrade, Vilanice, Ohrid, Skopje, Sofia, Sydney, Hobart, Wellington, Christchurch, Auckland, Tokyo, Tenri, Kyoto, Kumamoto, Kraków, Los Angeles, Toronto and Washington D.C. Some of his speeches are listed below:

- "So:Ba" given at the International Haiku Conference (SUNY Plattsburgh, NY, July 2008); published serially in Frogpond XXXI:3 2008 p. 73 (part one), ISSN 1089-9421, and forthcoming.
- "Bridges" given at the Haiku North America International Conference (Winston-Salem, NC, August 2007); published as "The Haiku Hierarchy," Modern Haiku 39(1), Spring 2008, ISSN 0026-7821.
- "State of the Art: Haiku in North America 2007" Second European Haiku Conference (Vadstena, Sweden, June 2007).
- "Dag Hammarskjöld: Haiku Poet and Photographer" (New York, January 2006 — book release of A String Untouched).
- Welcome Address (Sofia, Bulgaria, May 2005 — World Haiku Association Conference).
- Welcome Address (Tokyo, Japan, October 2003 — World Haiku Association Conference)
- "Around the World as Briefly as Possible", Pacific Rim Haiku Conference (November 2002, Los Angeles, California) published in Connecticut Review XXVII:2, Fall 2005, ISSN 0010-6216.
- "Looking and Seeing: How Haiga Works" given at the Haiku Society of American National Meeting, September 2002; published in Simply Haiku 2:5 (Autumn 2004); reprinted in The Red Moon Anthology of English-Language Haiku 2004 (Red Moon Press), pp. 126–153.
- "In search of +" given at the Third International Haiku Conference (Kraków, September 2024)

== Essays ==
- "Tapping the Common Well" (foreword) in Knots: The Anthology of Southeastern European Haiku Poetry Red Moon Press, 1999, ISBN 978-9619071502.
- "Beyond Kigo — In Due Season" in Acorn Supplement #1 (2000), ISSN 1521-138X.
- "Van Gogh's Shoes" in Valley Voices 8:1, ISSN 1553-7668.
- Renga-Daddy: A Kasen Renga between Basho, Boncho, Kyorai and Shiho in the manner of Tristan Tzara based on "The First Winter Rain" from The Monkey's Straw Raincoat in commemoration of the 300th Anniversary of Basho's Death; Frogpond XIX:1 ISSN.

== Theorist ==
His advocacy, along with that of such poets as Marlene Mountain and Janice Bostok, of single-line haiku in English has initiated renewed interest in this form following its rare usage during the 20th century. His work also champions several innovative techniques (as cited by Richard Gilbert in The Disjunctive Dragonfly and in his book Poems of Consciousness). Kacian's own critical writings elaborate some of these aesthetic innovations.

== Interviews ==
- The White Lotus Interview with Marie Summers - White Lotus #3 (Summer/Fall 2006), ISSN 1556-3987.
- The Cascina Macondo Interview with Alessandra Gallo (issue 13 of Writers Magazine Italia).

== Electronic media ==
- Presents of Mind CD (haiku: Jim Kacian, Shakuhachi: Jeff Cairns, Japanese reader: Takke Kanemitsu) (2006).
- Around the World as Briefly as Possible CD (2003).

== Bibliography ==
- Presents of Mind (Katsura Press, 1996), ISBN 0-9638551-8-2
- Chincoteague (Amelia Press, 1996), No ISBN
- Six Directions: Haiku and Field Notes (La Alameda Press, 1997), ISBN 0-9631909-4-6
- In Concert (Saki Press, 1999), ISBN 1-893823-07-5
- Second Spring (Red Moon Press, 2001), ISBN 1-893959-21-X
- Iz Kamna (Drustvo Apokalipsa, 2001), ISBN 961-6314-18-1
- dead reckoning (Red Moon Press, 2005), ISBN 1-893959-52-X
- How to Haiku (Red Moon Press, 2006), online version only; no ISBN
- border lands (Red Moon Press, 2006, ISBN 1-893959-58-9)
- Presents of Mind (second edition, bilingual; Red Moon Press, 2006), ISBN 1-893959-59-7
- orbis tertius (Red Moon Press, 2007), ISBN 978-1-893959-66-8
- long after (trilingual; Albalibri Editore, Rosignano Marittimo: Italy, 2008), ISBN 978-8889618585
- road of stone (Red Moon Press, 2009), ISBN 978-1-893959-80-4
- where i leave off / waar ik ophoud (’t schrijverke, 's-Hertogenbosch, 2010), ISBN 978-94-90607-02-9
- palimpsest (Red Moon Press, 2011)
- after/image (Red Moon Press, 2017), ISBN 978-1-947271-03-6
