= Reginald Horace Blyth =

British Japanologist (1898–1964)

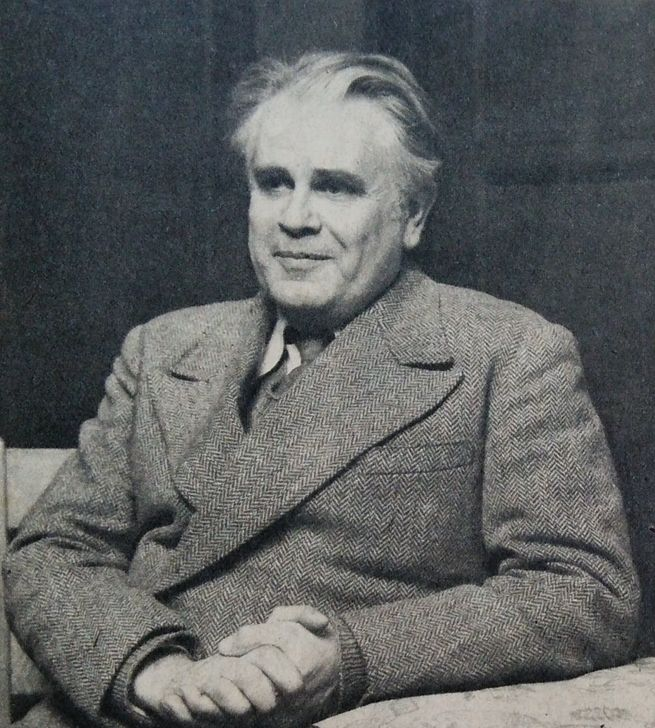
- Blyth in 1953
- Born: December 3, 1898; Essex, England
- Died: October 28, 1964 (aged 65); Tokyo, Japan

Reginald Horace Blyth (3 December 1898 – 28 October 1964) was an English writer and devotee of Japanese culture. He is most famous for his writings on Zen and on haiku poetry.

== Early life ==
Blyth was born in Essex, England, the son of a railway clerk. He was the only child of Horace and Henrietta Blyth. He attended Cleveland Road Primary School, in Ilford, then the County High School (later Ilford County High School). In 1916, at the height of World War I, he was imprisoned at Wormwood Scrubs, as a conscientious objector, before working on the Home Office Scheme at Princetown Work Centre in the former and future Dartmoor Prison. After the war he attended the University of London, where he read English and from which he graduated in 1923, with honours.

Blyth adopted a vegetarian lifestyle which he maintained throughout his life. Blyth played the flute, made musical instruments, and taught himself several European languages. He was particularly fond of the music of J. S. Bach. In 1924, he received a teaching certificate from London Day Training College. The same year, he married Anna Bercovitch, a university friend. Some accounts say they moved to India, where he taught for a while until he became unhappy with British colonial rule, but most scholars dismiss this episode, claiming it to have been invented or misunderstood by Blyth's mentor Daisetz T. Suzuki.

== Korea (1925–1935) ==
In 1925, the Blyths moved to Korea (then under Japanese rule), where Blyth became assistant professor of English at Keijō Imperial University in Keijō (now Seoul). While in Korea, Blyth began to learn Japanese and Chinese, and studied Zen under the master Hanayama Taigi of Myōshin-ji Keijo Betsuin (Seoul). In Korea he started to read D. T. Suzuki's books about Zen. In 1933, the couple informally adopted a Korean student, paying for his studies in Korea and later at London University. His wife broke up with him in 1934, and Blyth took one-year absence from the university in 1935, following her to England. After the divorce, Blyth returned to Korea in early 1936, leaving the adopted son with his ex-wife. The young man returned after World War II to Korea. In 1947 he was captured by North Korean soldiers; when he returned to the South, he was shot as a traitor by the South Korean army.

== Japan (1936–1964) ==
Having returned to Seoul in 1936, Blyth remarried in 1937, to a Japanese woman named Kijima Tomiko, with whom he had two daughters. In 1940 they moved to Kanazawa, Japan, which was D. T. Suzuki's home town, and Blyth took a job as an English teacher at the Fourth Higher School (later Kanazawa University).

When Britain declared war on Japan in December 1941 following the Japanese attack on Pearl Harbor, Blyth was interned as a British enemy alien. Although he expressed his sympathy for Japan and sought Japanese nationality, this was denied. During his internment, his extensive library was destroyed in an air raid. In the internment camp in Kobe he finished his first book Zen in English Literature and Oriental Classics and wrote parts of his books about haiku and senryu. He also met in the camp Robert Aitken, later Roshi of the Diamond Sangha in Honolulu.

After the war, Blyth worked diligently with the authorities, both Japanese and American, to ease the transition to peace. Blyth functioned as liaison to the Japanese Imperial Household, and his close friend, Harold Gould Henderson, was on General Douglas MacArthur's staff. Together, they helped draft the declaration Ningen Sengen, by which Emperor Hirohito declared himself to be a human being, and not divine.

By 1946, Blyth had become Professor of English at Gakushuin University, and became private tutor to the Crown Prince (later emperor) Akihito until the end of his [Blyth's] life. He did much to popularise Zen philosophy and Japanese poetry (particularly haiku) in the West. In 1954, he was awarded a doctorate in literature from Tokyo University, and, in 1959, he received the Zuihōshō (Order of Merit) Fourth Grade.

Blyth died in 1964, probably of a brain tumour and complications from pneumonia, in the Seiroka Hospital in Tokyo. He was buried in the cemetery of the Shokozan Tokei Soji Zenji Temple in Kamakura, next to his old friend, D. T. Suzuki. Blyth's posthumous Buddhist name is Bulaisu Kodo Shoshin Koju.

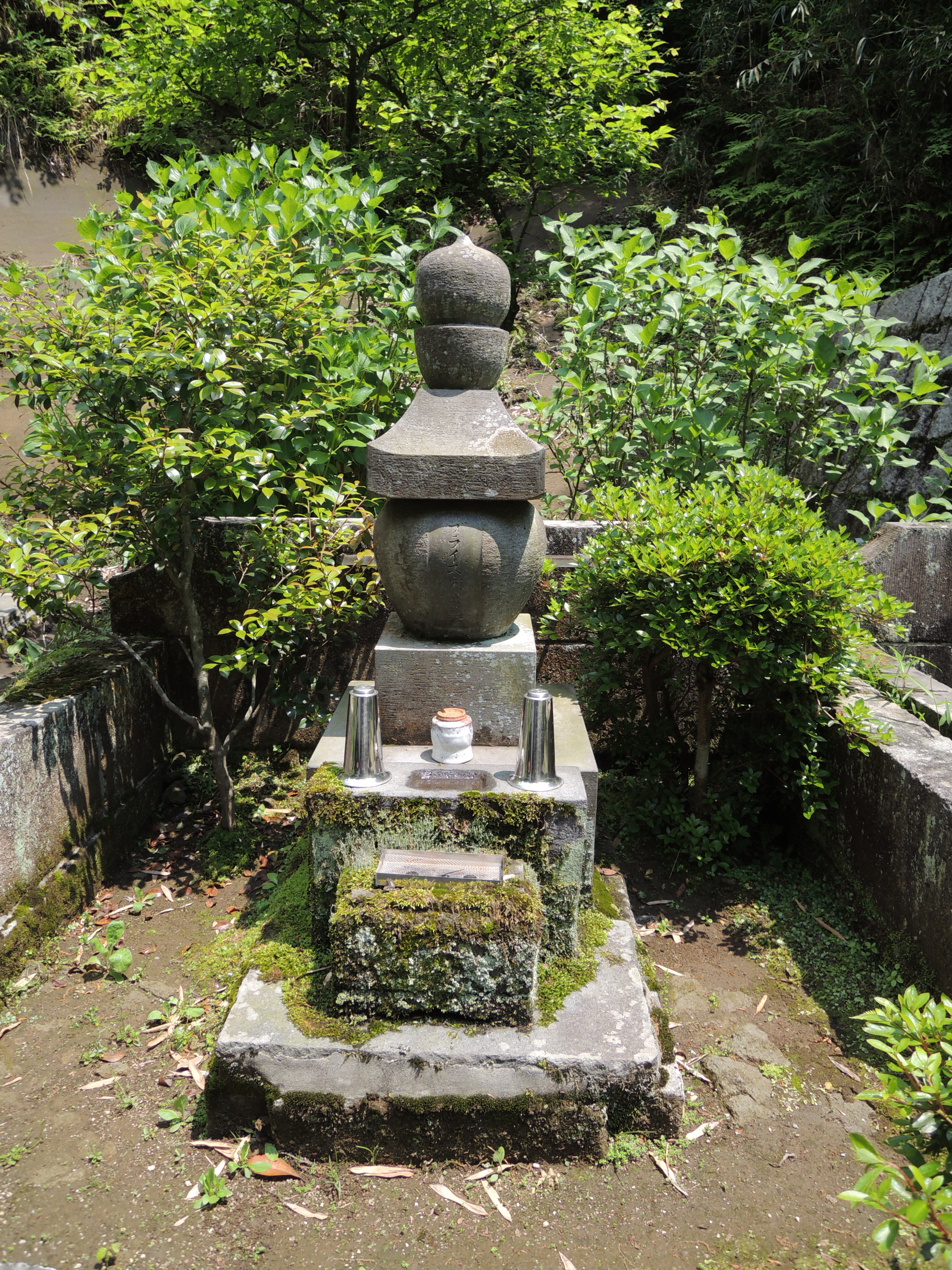
Blyth's tomb in Kamakura.

== Works ==
Blyth produced a series of work on Zen, haiku and senryū, and on other forms of Japanese and Asian literature.

He wrote six books on haiku (1949–52, 1963–64) and two books on senryū (1949, 1960), four books on humour in Asian and English literature (1957, 1959(a), 1959(b), 1961), as well as seven books on Zen (1942, 1952, 1960–64; posthumous 1966, 1970). Further publications include studies of English literature (1942, 1957, 1959(b)) and a three-fifths shortened version of A Week on the Concord and Merrimack Rivers by his favourite author Henry David Thoreau, along with an introduction and explanatory notes.

The most significant of his publications was his four-volume Haiku series (1949–52), his Zen in English Literature and Oriental Classics and his five-volume Zen series.

Nearly all of his books were published in Japan, by Hokuseido Press, Tokyo.

=== Zen ===
The actual 5-volume Zen and Zen Classics series is a modification by the publishers, caused by the unexpected death of Blyth, of the originally planned 8-volume project, which included a translation of the Hekiganroku (Piyenchi), a History of Korean Zen and of Japanese Zen (Dogen, Hakuin etc.) and a renewed edition of his 'Buddhist Sermons on Christian Texts' as volume 8; (as a result of the modification the already published volume 7 was reprinted as volume 5).

According to D.T. Suzuki, the Zen series should have been "the most complete work on Zen to be presented so far to the English-reading public".

The first volume presents a general introduction from the Upanishads to Huineng. Volume two and three presents a history of Zen from the Seigen Branch to Nangaku Branch, and volume five contains 25 essays on Zen. In volume four, Blyth translates the Mumonkan (Wumenkuan). Blyth's Mumonkan was the third complete translation into English, but the first one which was accompanied by extensive interpretive commentaries on each case.

Blyth's early publication Zen in English Literature and Oriental Classics, published 1942 when he was interned in Japan during World War II, and his Zen and Zen Classics series exerted a significant influence on the Western writers and Zen community, although nearly all of his books were published solely in Japan.

=== Haiku and Senryu ===
In an autobiographical note, Blyth writes: "By a fortunate chance I then came across haiku, or to speak more exactly Haiku no Michi, the Way of Haiku, which is the purely poetical (non-emotional, non-intellectual, non-moral, non-aesthetic) life in relation to nature. Next, the biggest bit of luck of all, Zen, through the books of Suzuki Daisetz ... Last but not least there appeared senryu, which might well be dignified by the term Senryu no Michi, the Way of Senryu, for it is an understanding of all things by laughing and smiling at them, and this means forgiving all things, ourselves and God included". Blyth wrote six books on haiku and two books on senryū, the satirical genre sister of haiku: "In haiku things speak for themselves with the voice of a man, in senryu things do not speak; we speak and speak for ourselves". Blythe wrote that in senryū the world is 'not seen as God made it' but 'as man sees it'; 'to haiku, sex hardly exists; to senryu, it is all pervading ... a great many deal with the subject of the Yoshiwara...'

After early imagist interest in haiku the genre drew less attention in English, until after World War II, with the appearance of a number of influential volumes about Japanese haiku.

In 1949, with the publication in Japan of the first volume of Haiku, Blyth's four-volume work, haiku was introduced to the post-war Western world. His Haiku series (1949–52) was dealing mostly with pre-modern haiku, though included Masaoka Shiki; later followed his two-volume History of Haiku (1963–64). Today he is best known as a major interpreter of haiku and senryū to English speakers.

Many contemporary Western writers of haiku were introduced to the genre through his Zen-based haiku explanations. These include the San Francisco and Beat Generation writers, Gary Snyder, Philip Whalen, Jack Kerouac and Allen Ginsberg, as well as J. D. Salinger ("...particularly haiku, but senryu, too...can be read with special satisfaction when R. H. Blyth was on them. Blyth is sometimes perilous, naturally, since he's a highhanded old poem himself, but he's also sublime"), Octavio Paz, and E. E. Cummings. Many members of the international "haiku community" also got their first views of haiku from Blyth's books, including American author James W. Hackett (born 1929), Eric Amann, William J. Higginson, Anita Virgil, Jane Reichhold, and Lee Gurga. The French philosopher and semiotician Roland Barthes read 1967 Blyth's four-volume set, using it for lectures and seminars on haiku 1979.

Some noted Blyth's distaste for haiku on more modern themes, some his strong bias regarding a direct connection between haiku and Zen, a connection largely ignored by modern Japanese poets. Bashō, in fact, felt that his devotion to haiku prevented him from realising enlightenment; and classic Japanese haiku poets like Chiyo-ni, Buson, and Issa were Pure Land (Jodo) rather than Zen Buddhists. Some also noted that Blyth did not view haiku by Japanese women favourably, that he downplayed their contribution to the genre, especially during the Bashō era. In the chapter 'Women Haiku Writers' Blyth writes: "Haiku for women, like Zen for women, - this subject makes us once more think about what haiku are, and a woman is…Women are said to be intuitive, and as they cannot think, we may hope this is so, but intuition…is not enough… [it] is doubtfull... whether women can write haiku".

Although Blyth did not foresee the appearance of original haiku in languages other than Japanese when he began writing on the topic, and although he founded no school of verse, his works stimulated the writing of haiku in English. At the end of the second volume of his History of Haiku, he remarked 1964 that "The latest development in the history of haiku is one which nobody foresaw... the writing of haiku outside Japan, not in the Japanese language."

== Bibliography ==
- Zen in English Literature and Oriental Classics, The Hokuseido Press, 1942, reprint 1996; Dutton 1960, ISBN 0525470573; Angelico Press 2016, ISBN 978-1621389736
- Haiku, in Four Volumes, Volume 1: Eastern Culture. Volume 2: Spring. Volume 3: Summer-Autumn. Volume 4: Autumn-Winter. The Hokuseido Press, 1949–1952; Reprint The Hokuseido Press/Heian International, 1981, ISBN 0-89346-184-9; Reprint Angelico Press, 2021, ISBN 978-1621387220
- Senryu: Japanese Satirical Verses, The Hokuseido Press, 1949; Reprint Greenwood Press, 1971 ISBN 0-8371-2958-3
- Translation: Japanese Cookbook (100 Favorite Japanese Recipes for Western Cooks) by Aya Kagawa, D.M., Japan Travel Bureau, 1949, 14. print Rev.&Enlarged 1962, 18. print Enlarged 1969
- A First Book of Korean, by Lee Eun and R. H. Blyth, The Hokuseido Press, c. 1950, Second Improved Edition, 1962
- A Shortened Version of A Week on the Concord and Merrimack Rivers by Henry David Thoreau with Introduction and Notes by R. H. Blyth, The Hokuseido Press, (1951)
- Buddhist Sermons on Christian Texts, Kokudosha 1952; Heian International, 1976, ISBN 978-0-89346-000-6
- Ikkyu's Doka; in: The Young East, Vols II.2 - III.9, Tokyo, 1952–1954; Reprint in: Blyth, Zen and Zen Classics, Vol. 5, 1966
- Japanese Humour, Japan Travel Bureau, 1957
- A Survey of English Literature, from the Beginnings to Modern Times, The Hokuseido Press, 1957
- Oriental Humour, The Hokuseido Press, 1959(a)
- Humour in English Literature: A Chronological Anthology, The Hokuseido Press, 1959(b); Reprint Folcroft Library Editions, 1973, ISBN 0-8414-3278-3
- Japanese Life and Character in Senryu, The Hokuseido Press, 1960.
- Edo Satirical Verse Anthologies, The Hokuseido Press, 1961; Heian International 1977, ISBN 9780893460150
- A History of Haiku in Two Volumes. Volume 1: From the Beginnings up to Issa, 1963, ISBN 0-9647040-2-1. Volume 2: From Issa up to the Present, The Hokuseido Press, 1964, ISBN 0-9647040-3-X
- Zen and Zen Classics, in Five Volumes (planned set of 8 Volumes), Volume 1: General Introduction, from the Upanishads to Huineng, 1960, ISBN 0-89346-204-7; also reprinted as 'What is Zen? General Introduction…', ISBN 4590011301. Volume 2: History of Zen (Seigen Branch),1964, ISBN 0-89346-205-5. Volume 3: History of Zen (cont'd) (Nangaku Branch), 1970 (posthumous; edited by N.A. Waddell and N. Inoue). Volume 4: Mumonkan, 1966 (posthumous); reprint 2002 under the title 'Mumonkan - The Zen Masterpiece'. Volume 5: Twenty-Five Zen Essays (wrong subtitle on Dust Jacket 'Twenty-Four Essays'), (first published as Volume 7, 1962), reprinted 1966, ISBN 0-89346-052-4. The Hokuseido Press
- Translation: Ikkyu's Skeletons (with N. A. Waddell), in: The Eastern Buddhist, N.S. Vol. VI No. 1, May 1973
- Poetry and Zen: Letters and Uncollected Writings of R. H. Blyth. Edited by N. A. Waddell, Shambala Publ., 2022, ISBN 978-1-61180-998-5

Selection:

- Games Zen Masters Play: Writings of R. H. Blyth, Edited by Robert Sohl and Audrey Carr, Signet, 1976, ISBN 9780451624161
- Selections from R.H. Blyth, Zen and Zen Classics. Compiled and with Drawings by Frederick Franck, Vintage Books, 1978, ISBN 0-394-72489-5
- Essentially Oriental. R. H. Blyth Selection, Edited by Kuniyoshi Munakata and Michael Guest, Hokuseido Press, 1994, ISBN 4-590-00954-4
- The Genius of Haiku. Readings from R. H.Blyth on poetry, life, and Zen. With an Introduction by James Kirkup, The British Haiku Society, 1994, ISBN 9780952239703; The Hokuseido Press, 1995, ISBN 4-590-00988-9

Writings/Textbooks for Students:

- Writings/Textbooks for Students (most of them at the University of Maryland, Hornbake Library, Gordon W. Prange Collection) include: R.L. Stevenson: Will O' the Mill, Hokuseido Press 1948; Selections from Thoreau's Journals, Daigakusyorin, Tokyo 1949; William Hazlitt: An Anthology, 1949; The Poems of Emerson: a Selection, Kenkyusha,1949; A Chronological Anthology of Nature in English Literature, 1949; An Anthology of English Poetry, 1952; Dorothy Wordsworth's Journals (with Introduction and Footnotes), Hokuseido Press, 1952, ISBN 4590000385; R. L. Stevenson, Fables: with introduction and notes by R. H. Blyth, Nan'un-Do, Tokyo 1953; How to Read English Poetry, Hokuseido Press, (c.1957) 1958, 1971
- Writings/Textbooks for Students (Publishing Unclear) include: An Anthology of Nineteenth Century Prose, 1950; Thoughts on Culture, 1950; A Chronological Anthology of Religion in English Literature, 1951; English Through Questions and Answers, 1951; Easy Poems, Book 1 and 2, 1959; More English through Questions and Answers, 1960;

== Further listening ==
- Alan W. Watts, Zen and Senryu, Read by Alan Watts and Sumire Hasegawa Jacobs, Musical commentary by Vincent Delgado, Translations by R. H. Blyth, CD locust music 49, 2004 (Vinyl 1959)
- Alan W. Watts, Haiku, Read by Alan Watts and Sumire Jacobs, Musical commentary by Vincent Delgado, Translations by R. H. Blyth, CD locust music 50, 2004 (first broadcast on KPFA Radio 1958; Vinyl 1959)
