= Lee Gurga =

American poet

Lee Gurga (born July 28, 1949 in Chicago, Illinois) is an American haiku poet. In 1997 he served as president of the Haiku Society of America. He was the editor of Modern Haiku magazine from 2002 to 2006, and is the current editor of the Modern Haiku Press. Gurga lives in Lincoln, Illinois, where he works as a dentist. Also involved in the translation of Japanese haiku into English, Gurga cites Matsuo Bashō, a Japanese poet from the Edo period, as one of his main appreciations. One of his most known haiku is about graduation day for students and is presented in his book Haiku: A Poet's Guide.

== Background ==
Born in Chicago, Gurga attended the University of Illinois at Urbana–Champaign. He first became interested in haiku during his high school years after reading a haiku translation book by Reginald Horace Blyth. He started his own haiku writing after that, focusing on Midwest imagery and scenery for his topics.

== Bibliography ==
- The Measure of Emptiness (Press Here, 1991)
- In and Out of Fog (Press Here, 1997)
- Fresh Scent (Brooks Books, 1998)
- Haiku: A Poet's Guide (Modern Haiku Press, 2003)
- Autumn Mosquito (2005)
