= Modern Haiku =

American haiku journal

- Editor: Paul Miller
- Categories: Literary magazine
- Frequency: Triannual
- Publisher: Modern Haiku Press
- First issue: 1969
- Country: United States
- Website: www.modernhaiku.org

Modern Haiku is an independent haiku and haiku studies journal, publishing English-language haiku, based in the United States. Its first issue appeared in 1969, making it, as of 2025, the longest-running haiku journal outside of Japan. Throughout its history, it has featured many of the most prominent poets working within the haiku genre and has been described as "a premier publication for haiku poets around the world" and "the equivalent of Poetry magazine for the haiku world." A 2019 Paris Review article noted it is "widely considered the preeminent organ of English-language haiku and haiku-related art." It was founded by Kay Mormino, and is currently under the editorship of Paul Miller.

== Journal philosophy ==
Modern Haiku publishes haiku that mostly avoid the 5-7-5 format, and considers syllable or line count "not vital in contemporary English-language haiku." According to Modern Haiku, "good haiku avoid subjectivity; intrusions of the poet’s ego, views, or values; and displays of intellect, wit, and facility with words."
