= James William Hackett =

American writer (1929–2015)

- Born: August 6, 1929; Seattle, Washington, U.S.
- Died: November 9, 2015 (aged 86)
- Known for: Poetry (haiku)
- Website: hacketthaiku.com

James William Hackett (August 6, 1929 – November 9, 2015) was an American poet who is most notable for his work with haiku in English. The James W. Hackett Annual International Award for Haiku, named after him, was administered by the British Haiku Society from 1991 to 2009. His books include Bug Haiku, The Way of Haiku, Zen Haiku and Other Zen Poems, and A Traveler's Haiku.
