= Wally Swist =

American poet

Wally Swist (born 1953) is an American poet and writer. He is best known for his poems about nature and spirituality.

== Biography ==
Swist was born April 26, 1953, in New Haven, Connecticut. It is rumoured he attended Yale University but not confirmed he was actually registered. He currently makes his home in South Amherst, Massachusetts. For over three decades, he was a bookseller and a bookstore manager, dealing in antiquarian, new, and used books. He has published more than forty of his own books and chapbooks of poetry and prose. For the last several years, he has been a freelance editor and writer.

== Writing and teaching ==
Swist has published over two hundred feature articles and reviews, yet his focus has been writing poetry. His poems have appeared in literary magazines and anthologies, such as Alaska Quarterly Review and Spiritus, the latter issued by Johns Hopkins University Press, as well as popular magazines such as Rolling Stone and Yankee. Readings of his work are online at National Public Radio and Sahara: A Journal of New England Poetry published a special issue devoted to his work in the winter of 2003.

His translations have been published in Asymptote, Chicago Quarterly Review, Chiron Review, Ezra: An Online Journal of Translation, The Montreal Review, Poetry London, and Transference: A Literary Journal Featuring the Art & Process of Translation (Western Michigan Department of Languages), among others.

In addition, he has taught in the Connecticut Poetry-in-the-Schools Program and was a mentor and teacher, for three summers (2001-2003), in the Night of Fresh Voices Program, in which he worked with gifted high school students, through the Sunken Garden Poetry Festival, at the Hill-Stead Museum in Farmington, Connecticut.

Swist has also contributed significantly to North American haiku literature both as his decade-long stint as Book Review Editor of Modern Haiku (1987–1996), and with the hundreds of haiku he published in a multitude of literary journals. Of the several significant anthologies of haiku his work is represented in, a half dozen of his haiku are included in the anthology, Haiku in English: The First Hundred Years, published by W. W. Norton & Company in 2013.

He is an authority on fellow poet Robert Francis (poet), a friend and literary mentor.

He is also the writer and editor of Moscow Ballet's Great Russian Nutcracker that was published by Talmi Entertainment in November 2012 as a children's book illustrated by Olga Lorionova.

In October 2012, he was invited to be a Visiting Writer at Southern Illinois University, in Carbondale, Illinois, and he participated in the Devil's Kitchen Literary Festival. Also, in April 2013, he was invited to be a Visiting Writer at Sacred Heart University, in Fairfield, Connecticut.

== Fellowships, awards, and honors ==
Swist was awarded Artists Fellowships in Poetry from the Connecticut Commission on the Arts in 1978 and in 2003. The Trustees of the Estate of Robert Francis awarded him three writing residencies at Fort Juniper, the Robert Francis Homestead, in North Amherst, Massachusetts, in the autumn of 1998, and two back-to-back residencies from September 2003 through August 2005.

He was invited to give a lecture at the Frost Farm, in Derry, New Hampshire, in August 2002, which he entitled "High Pressure Weather and Country Air: The Friendship of Robert Frost and Robert Francis." This later led to his developing a book-length essay, published by Edwin Mellen Press in 2009, Two New England Poets: Robert Frost and Robert Francis. Constance Hunting, editor of The Puckerbrush Review, where the essay initially appeared called it "a previously unwritten work of significant scholarship," elucidating the connection between Frost and Francis.

He was twice awarded the Museum of Haiku Literature (Tokyo) Award (Frogpond, XIII: 2, 1990 and Frogpond, XVIII: 3, 1995). His selected haiku, The Silence Between Us, was published by Brooks Books in their Goodrich Haiku Master's Series in 2005.

Yusef Komunyakaa selected Swist's full-length volume Huang Po and the Dimensions of Love as a co-winner of the 2011 Crab Orchard Series Open Poetry Competition. Southern Illinois University Press published the book in August 2012.

Huang Po and the Dimensions of Love was nominated for the National Book Award in Poetry by Southern Illinois University Press in 2012.

His poem "Velocity" was awarded 2nd Prize in the William Butler Yeats Society of New York City 2012 Poetry Contest, of which Bill Zavatsky served as judge.

From 2012 through 2018, he was awarded several grants of financial assistance. These included the Philip Whalen Memorial Grant from Poets in Need, of Berkeley, California, as well as being the recipient of multiple grants of financial assistance from The Authors League Fund; PEN America; and the Carnegie Fund for Authors, all of New York City; and The Haven Fund, of Brewer, Maine.

In April 2013, he was the recipient of The 2013 Snapshot Press Book Award for his manuscript, The Windbreak Pine: New and Uncollected Haiku, 1985-2015. Swist was awarded a Touchstone Distinguished Book Award from The Haiku Foundation for this book in April 2017.

Garrison Keillor read his poem "Radiance" on The Writers Almanac radio program in July 2014.

Swist was one of fourteen poets to have their poems installed into a Dedication of Poetry in Edmands Park, in Newton, Massachusetts, on 2 November 2014, in conjunction with the Boston Literary District Program. The poems, on permanent display, were selected by adjudication through a national contest and contain natural themes. Swist's poem, "Wild Falling," is presented on stone on the second of two stone pillars on Blake Street, which face the road. Also, in November 2014, he was announced the winner of the Judd's Hill Winery Poetry Contest for his poems "Montepulciano and Caravaggio," "Ode to February," and "The Toast."

Swist's poem, "Heirloom," was selected by Anita Barrows, known for her translations of Rilke with her colleague Joanna Macy, as a finalist in the 2015 Littoral Press Broadside Competition. Lisa Rappoport, master printer of Littoral Press, published the poem as a letterpress limited edition broadside in October 2015.

Swist was the winner of the 2018 Adelaide Books Essay Contest for his essay, "On Beauty." The essay was also the eponymous title of the book Adelaide Books published later that year, On Beauty: Essays, Reviews, Fiction, and Plays.

In December 2018, Gabriel Rummonds, master printer and publisher of Ex Ophidia Press, located in Bainbridge Island, Washington, announced that Swist was the winner of the 2018 Ex Ophidia Press Poetry Prize for his collection A Bird Who Seems to Know Me: Poems Regarding Birds & Nature. The collection includes 50 lyric and short narrative poems and some 60 haiku. The book was published in the autumn of 2019.

Robert Sternau, Editor of "Sufi: Journal of Mystical Philosophy & Practice," highlighted Swist as the "Feature Poet" in Issue #98, the Winter 2019/2020 issue of the journal, and in doing so published "The Bees of the Invisible," the eponymous poem of his 2019 Shanti Arts poetry collection.

Jason Barber, Editor of "Buddhist Poetry Review," published Swist's "After Lu Chi’s Wen Fu," based on a translation by Shih-Hsiang Chen (1952), which had then been modified after consulting a translation by Sam Hamill (1991 & 2000). It appears in full as a feature in the July 2020 issue of the journal, and includes all fifteen parts of the work. Lu Chi (261-303) was a third and fourth century Chinese poet of the Jin Dynasty, and his "Wen Fu" ("The Art of Writing") is "considered one of the most articulated treatises on Chinese poetics." As of the July 2020 issue, all of Swist's previous contributions to "Buddhist Poetry Review," which date between 2010 and 2021, can now also be found archived online.

== Documentary and audiobook ==
A short biographical documentary film regarding his work as a poet and a writer, In Praise of the Earth: The Poetry of Wally Swist (Hadley, MA: WildArts), was released in April 2008 by award-winning filmmaker Elizabeth Wilda.

An audiobook of sixty-five of his poems, Open Meadow: Odes to Nature (Monterey, MA: Berkshire Media Artists) was released in April 2012. Several of the tracks of the poems are accompanied by the compositions of Claude Debussy, Gabriel Faure, and Ralph Vaughan Williams, which were played by pianist Sarah Edelstein, and recorded live at the studios of Berkshire Media Artists (BMA).

== Works ==
=== Books of poetry ===
- Taking Residence, Brunswick, ME: Shanti Arts Publishing, 2021.
- Awakening & Visitation, Brunswick, ME: Shanti Arts Publishing, 2020.
- Evanescence: Selected Poems, Brunswick, ME: Shanti Arts Publishing, 2020.
- The Bees of the Invisible, Brunswick, ME: Shanti Arts Publishing, 2019.
- A Bird Who Seems to Know Me: Poems Regarding Birds & Nature, Bainbridge Island, WA, Ex Ophidia Press, 2019.
- The Map of Eternity, Brunswick, ME: Shanti Arts Publishing, 2018.
- Candling the Eggs, Brunswick, ME: Shanti Arts Publishing, 2017.
- The View of the River, Hemet, CA: Kelsay Books/White Violet Press, 2017.
- Invocation, Beaumont, TX: Lamar University Literary Press, 2015.
- Velocity, Chicago, IL: Virtual Artists Collective, 2013.
- Huang Po and the Dimensions of Love, Carbondale, IL: Southern Illinois University Press, 2012.
- Winding Paths Worn through Grass, Chicago, IL: Virtual Artists Collective, 2012.
- Luminous Dream, Cave Spring, GA: FutureCycle Press, 2010.
- Veils of the Divine, Newtown, CT: Hanover Press, 2003.
- The New Life, Hartford, CT: Plinth Books, 1998; Second Edition, 2003.
- For the Dance, Easthampton, MA: Adastra Press, 1991.
- New Haven Poems, Hamden, CT: Connecticut Fireside Press, 1977.

=== Poetry chapbooks ===
- Sharing Stories at Lunch, Fulton, MO: El Grito del Lobo Press (Poem-in-a-Pamphlet), 2021.
- Things I Know I Love: Odes to Food, Georgetown, KY: Finishing Line Press, 2015.
- Blessing and Homage, Cambridge, MA and Chicago, IL: Timberline Press, 2012.
- Mount Toby Poems, Fulton, MO: Timberline Press, 2009.
- Snow Geese: A Mountain Poem, Hartford, CT: Andrew Mountain Press (Poem-in-a-Pamphlet Series), 1996.
- Waking Up the Ducks, Easthampton, MA: Adastra Press, 1987.
- Of What We’re Given, Guilford, CT: Dunk Rock Books, 1980.

=== Books of poetry in translation ===
- Fruit of my Flower: New & Selected Translations from the Spanish, Brunswick, ME: Shanti Arts Publishing, 2024.
- L’Allegria/Cheerfulness (Poems 1914-1919) by Giuseppi Ungaretti: A New Translation from the Italian, Brunswick, ME: Shanti Arts Publishing, 2023.
- The Daodejing: A New Interpretation by David Breeden, Steven Schroeder, and Wally Swist, Beaumont, TX: Lamar University Press, 2015.

=== Books of haiku ===
- Selected Haiku, Ormskirk, UK: Snapshot Press, 2025.
- Uphill along the Woodland, Ormskirk, UK: Snapshot Press, 2024.
- The Windbreak Pine: New and Uncollected Haiku, 1985-2015, Ormskirk, U.K.: Snapshot Press, 2016.
- The Silence Between Us: The Selected Haiku of Wally Swist, Decatur, IL: Brooks Books, 2005.
- The Mown Meadow: First Selected Haiku and Sequences, 1977-1994, San Diego, CA: Los Hombres Press, 1996.

=== Haiku chapbooks ===
- The White Rose, Fulton, MO: Timberline Press, 2000.
- Train Whistle, Aylmer, Quebec, Canada: Proof Press, 1996.
- Blowing Reeds, Fulton, MO: Timberline Press, 1995.
- The Gristmill’s Trough, Richland Center, WI: Hummingbird Press, 1991.
- Sugaring Buckets, Battle Ground, IN: High/Coo Press, 1989.
- Unmarked Stones, Sherbrooke, Quebec, Canada: Burnt Lake Press, 1988.
- Chimney Smoke, La Crosse, WI: Juniper Press, 1988.

=== Nonfiction/memoir ===
- Singing for Nothing: Selected Nonfiction as Literary Memoir, Brooklyn, NY: The Operating System, 2018.

=== Belles lettres ===
- A Writer's Statements on Beauty: New & Selected Essays & Reviews, Brunswick, ME: Shanti Arts Publishing, 2022.
- On Beauty: Essays, Reviews, Fiction, and Plays, New York & Lisbon: Adelaide Books, 2018.

=== Scholarly monograph ===
- The Friendship of Two New England Poets: Robert Frost and Robert Francis, A Lecture Presented at the Robert Frost Farm in Derry, New Hampshire, Lewiston, NY: Edwin Mellen Press, 2009.

=== Children's book ===
- Moscow Ballet's Great Russian Nutcracker, Pittsfield, MA: Talmi Entertainment, 2012.

=== Short biographical documentary film ===
- In Praise of the Earth: The Poetry of Wally Swist, Hadley, MA: WildArts, 24 Minutes, 2008.

=== Audiobook ===
- Open Meadow: Odes to Nature, Monterey, MA: Berkshire Media Arts, 79 Minutes, 2012.

=== Selected Anthology Appearances ===
- How to Love the World: Poems of Love and Hope, James Crews, Editor, North Adams, MA: Storey Publishing, 2021.
- Except for Love: New England Poets Inspired by Donald Hall, Cynthia Brackett-Vincent, Editor, Farmington, ME: Encircle Publications, 2019.
- Unlocking the Word: A Found Poem Anthology, Jonas Zdanys, Editor, Beaumont, Texas: Lamar University Press, 2018.
- Ice Cream Poems: Reflections on Life with Ice Cream, Patricia Fargnoli, Editor, Tillamook, OR: World Enough Writers/Concrete Wolf, 2017.
- A Mighty Room: A Collection of Poems Written in Emily Dickinson's Bedroom , Michael Medeiros, Editor, Introduction by Jane Wald, Amherst, MA: Emily Dickinson Museum, 2015.
- Weatherings, Robert S. King & David Chorlton, Editors, Lexington, KY: FutureCycle Press (Good Works Series), 2015.
- Pushing the Envelope: Epistolary Poems, Jonas Zdanys, Editor, Beaumont, Texas: Lamar University Press, 2015.
- Lay Bare the Canvas: New England Poets on Art, Providence, RI: The Poetry Loft/Providence Public Library, 2014.
- Haiku in English: The First Hundred Years, Jim Kacian, Philip Rowland, and Allan Burns, Editors, Introduction by Billy Collins, New York, NY: W. W. Norton & Company, 2013.
- Where the River Goes: The Nature Tradition in English Language Haiku, Allan Burns, Editor, Ormskirk, U.K.: Snapshot Press, 2013.
- Sunken Garden Poetry: 1992-2011, Middletown, CT: Wesleyan University Press, 2012.
- American Society: What Poets See, Hayesville, NC: FutureCycle Press (Good Works Series), 2013.
- Fair Warning: Leo Connellan and His Poetry, Sheila Murphy and Marilyn Nelson, Editors, Tokyo, Japan: Printed Matter, 2011.
- Solace in So Many Words, Glenview, IL: Hourglass Books/Weighed Words LLC, 2011.
- From the Other World: Poems in Memory of James Wright, Duluth, MN: Lost Hills Books, 2008.
- The Duchess of Malfi’s Apricots and Other Literary Fruits, Robert Palter, Editor, Columbia, SC: University of South Carolina Press, 2002.
- Haiku: Ancient and Modern, Jackie Hardy, Editor, Rutland, VT: Charles E. Tuttle & Company, Inc., 2002.
- Stories from Where We Live: The North Atlantic Coast, Sara St. Antoine, Editor, Minneapolis, MN: Milkweed Editions, 2000.
- The Haiku Anthology, Cor van den Heuvel, Editor, New York, NY: W. W. Norton & Company, Inc., 1999.
- Haiku sans frontieres, Andre Duhaime, Editor and Translator, Ottawa, Ontario, Canada: Les Editions David, 1998.
- Anthology of Magazine Verse and Yearbook of American Poetry, Beverly Hills, CA: Monitor Book Company, 1997.
- Haiku World: An International Poetry Almanac, William Higginson, Editor, Tokyo, Japan & New York, NY: Kodansha International, 1996.
- Place of the Long River: A Connecticut River Anthology of Poetry and Prose with Views from the Source to the Sound, Jim Lee, Editor and Master Printer, Glastonbury, CT: Blue Moon Press, 1995.
- Haiku Moment: An Anthology of Contemporary North American Haiku, Bruce Ross, Editor, Rutland, VT: Charles E. Tuttle & Company, Inc., 1993.

=== Letterpress/Illustrated Poetry Broadsides ===
- Heirloom, Berkeley, CA: Littoral Press, Letterpress Limited Edition, 2015.
- Tone Poem for Summer Solstice, Charlestown, MA: Timberline Press, Letterpress Limited Edition, 2012.
- The Other Side of the Glass, Hartford, CT: University of Hartford, Letterpress Limited Edition, 2011.
- Ode to Elizabeth Park, Glastonbury, CT: Blue Moon Press, Letterpress Limited Edition, 2011.
- For Walt Whitman, Fulton, MO: Timberline Press, Letterpress Limited Edition, 2010.
- Putting Up the Mailbox, Fulton, MO: Timberline Press, Letterpress Limited Edition, 2007.
- Heron, Hartford, CT: Hartford Public Library, Illustrated, 2003.
- Accompaniment, Easthampton, MA: Adastra Press, Letterpress Limited Edition, 2003.
- In You, Jamaica, VT: Bull Thistle Press, Letterpress Limited Edition, 1995.
- old man sweeping, Richmond, MA: Mad River Press, Letterpress Limited Edition, 1988.
