= Cor van den Heuvel =

American poet (1931–2024)

- Born: March 6, 1931; Biddeford, Maine, U.S.
- Died: September 12, 2024 (aged 93); Long Island, New York, U.S.
- Occupations: Poet, editor
- Spouse: Leonia "Leigh" Larrecq van den Heuvel
- Children: Dirk jan van den Heuvel
- Writing career
- Genre: Haiku

Cor Van den Heuvel (March 6, 1931 – September 12, 2024) was an American haiku poet, editor and archivist.

== Biography ==
Van den Heuvel was born in Biddeford, Maine, and grew up in Maine and New Hampshire. He spent most of his life in New York City living in the East Village in Manhattan. He lived out his final decade on Long Island near his niece and writing haiku.

He first discovered haiku in 1958 in San Francisco where he heard Gary Snyder mention it at a poetry reading. He returned to the East Coast the following year and continued composing haiku. He became the house poet of a Boston coffee house, reading haiku and other poetry to jazz musical accompaniment. In 1971 he joined the Haiku Society of America and became its president in 1978.

Heuvel died on September 12, 2024, at the age of 93.

== Work ==
Van den Heuvel has published several books of his own haiku, including one on baseball. He is the editor of the three editions of The Haiku Anthology; the original Haiku Anthology published in 1974 by Doubleday, the second edition published in 1986 by Simon & Schuster, and the third edition published in 1999 by Norton.

== Honors ==
The Haiku Society of America has given Van den Heuvel three Merit Book Awards for his haiku. He was the honorary curator of the American Haiku Archives at the California State Library at Sacramento for 1999–2000. He worked at Newsweek magazine in the layout department until he retired in 1988. He was the United States representative to the 1990 International Haiku Symposium in Matsuyama. At the World Haiku Festival held in London and Oxford in 2000, he received a World Haiku Achievement Award. In 2002, he was awarded The Masaoka Shiki International Haiku Awards in Matsuyama, for his writing and editing of haiku books.

He has been described in The Alsop Review as "an intelligent and unflagging spokesperson for haiku".

== Bibliography ==
- the window washer's pail (author, as corneliszavandelheuvel), chantpress, 1963, edition of 127
- The Haiku Anthology (editor), 1st edition, Anchor Books, 1974, ISBN 978-0-385-09474-0
- The Haiku Anthology (editor), 2nd edition, Simon and Schuster, 1986, ISBN 0-671-62837-2
- The Haiku Anthology (editor), 3rd edition, Norton, 1999, ISBN 0-393-32118-5
- Past Time: Baseball Haiku (editor, with Jim Kacian), Red Moon Press, 1999, ISBN 978-1-893959-07-1
- Play Ball : Baseball Haiku (author), Red Moon Press, 1999, ISBN 978-1-893959-06-4
- Baseball Haiku (editor, with Nanae Tamura), Norton, 2007, ISBN 978-0-393-06219-9
- A Boy's Seasons: Haibun Memoirs (author), Single Island Press, 2010, ISBN 978-0-9740895-8-4
- Splashes (author), House of Haiku, 2023, ISBN 978-0962604058

== See also ==
- Jim Kacian
