= Kashima Shrine =

Shinto shrine in Ibaraki, Japan

Kashima Shrine 鹿島神宮 (Kashima Jingu)
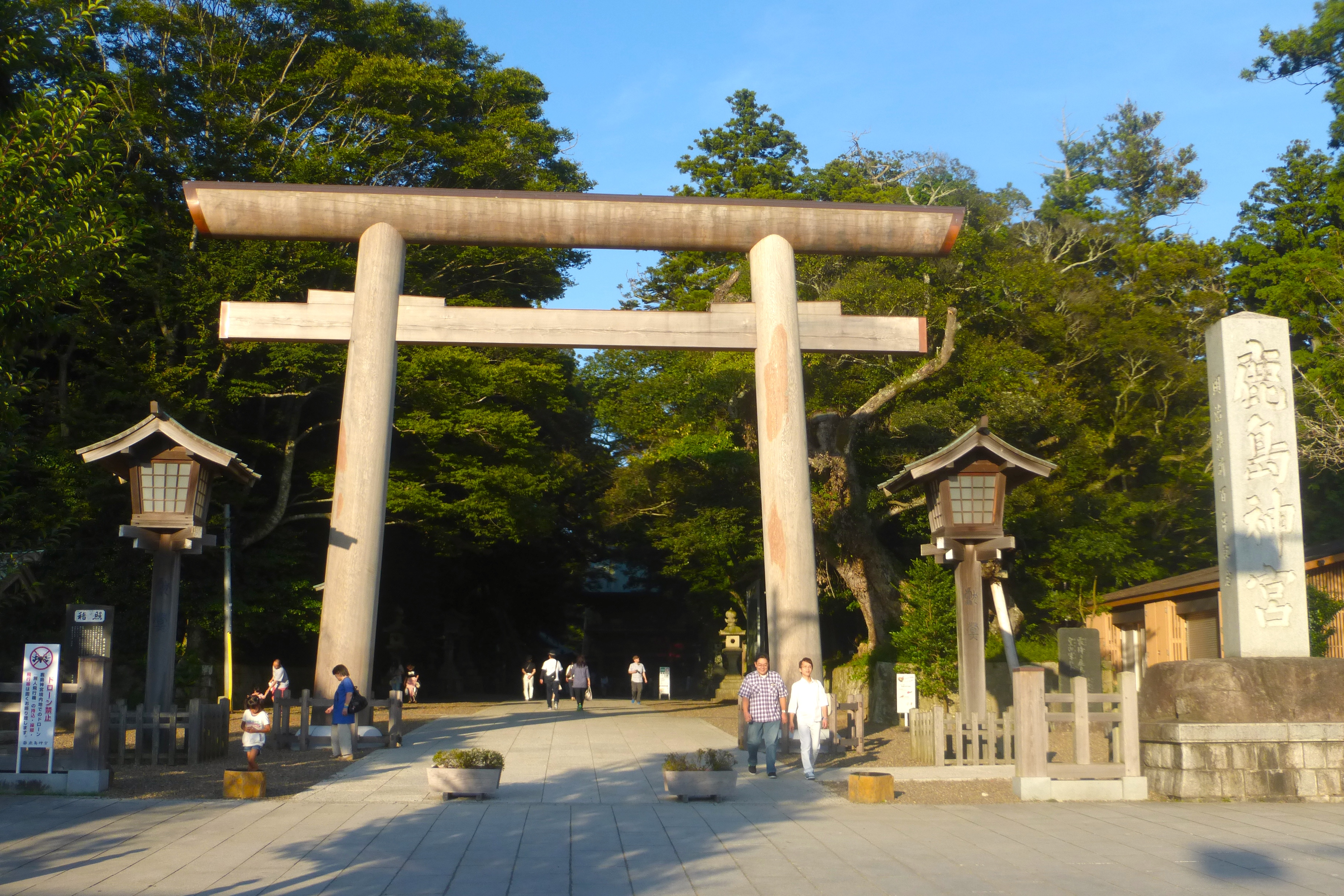
- Main rebuilt torii gate, 2015

- Location within Japan

Religion
- Affiliation: Shinto
- Deity: Takemikazuchi
- Festival: Reitaisai (September 1)
- Type: Shikinaisha; Hitachi no Kuni ichinomiya Former kanpeitaisha Chokusaisha; Beppyo jinja

Location
- Location: 2306-1, Kyuchu, Kashima, Ibaraki Prefecture, JAPAN, 314-0031
- Interactive map of Kashima Shrine 鹿島神宮 (Kashima Jingu)
- Coordinates: 35°58′08″N 140°37′53″E

Architecture
- Style: Sangensya-Nagare-zukuri
- Established: （伝）初代神武天皇元年

Website
- www.kashimajingu.jp/wp/

Kashima Shrine (鹿島神宮, Kashima Jingū) is a Shinto shrine located in Kashima, Ibaraki in the northern Kantō region of Japan. It is dedicated to Takemikazuchi-no-Ōkami (武甕槌大神), one of the patron deities of martial arts. Various dōjō of kenjutsu and kendō often display a hanging scroll emblazoned with the name "Takemikazuchi-no-Ōkami". Prior to World War II, the shrine was ranked as one of the three most important imperial shrines Jingū (神宮) in the Shinto hierarchy, along with Ise Grand Shrine (伊勢神宮 Ise Jingū) and Katori Shrine (香取神宮 Katori Jingū). During the New Year period, from the first to the third of January, Kashima Shrine is visited by over 600,000 people from all over Japan. It is the second most visited shrine in Ibaraki prefecture for new year pilgrims.

== Introduction ==
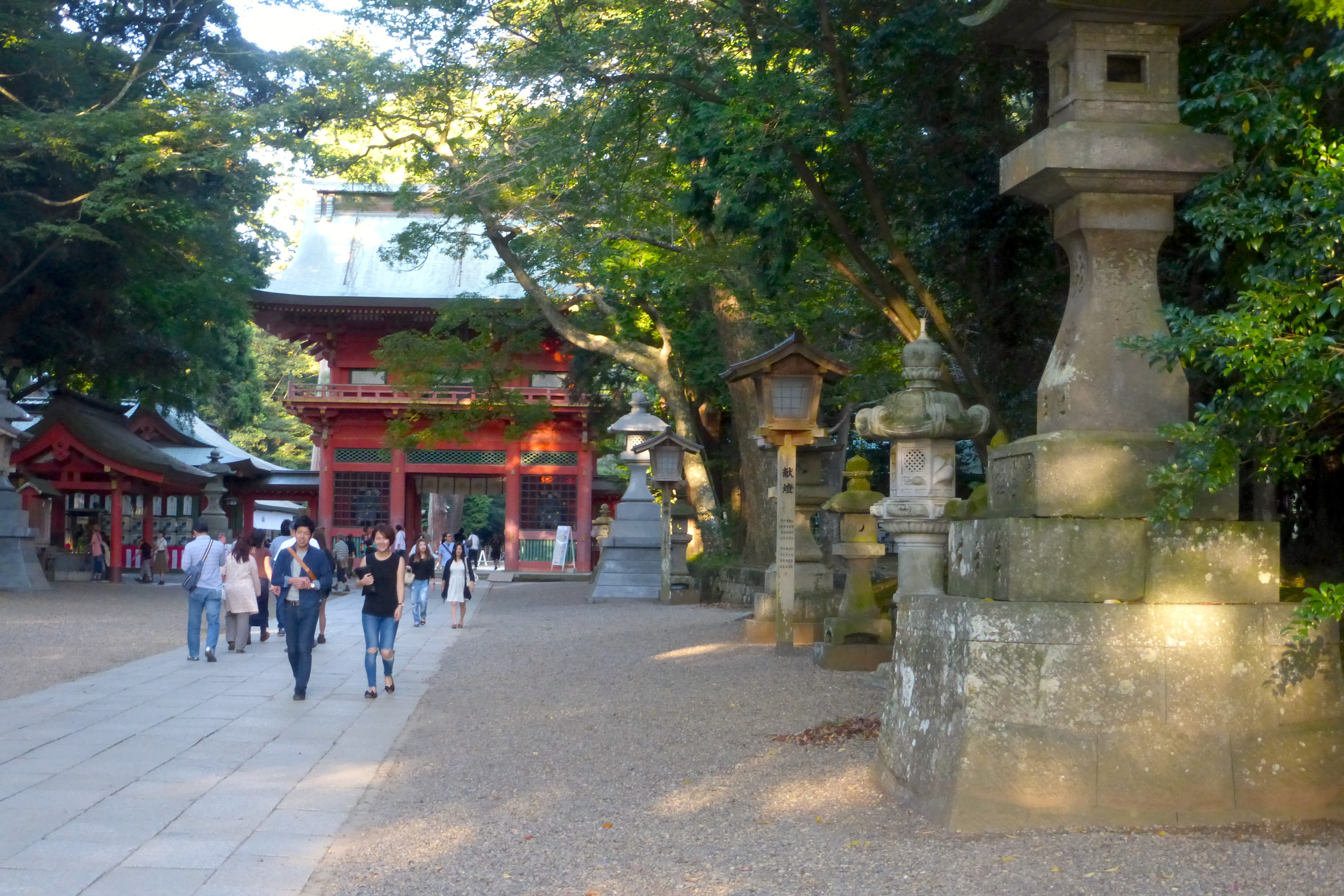
Romon gate and stone lanterns, 2015

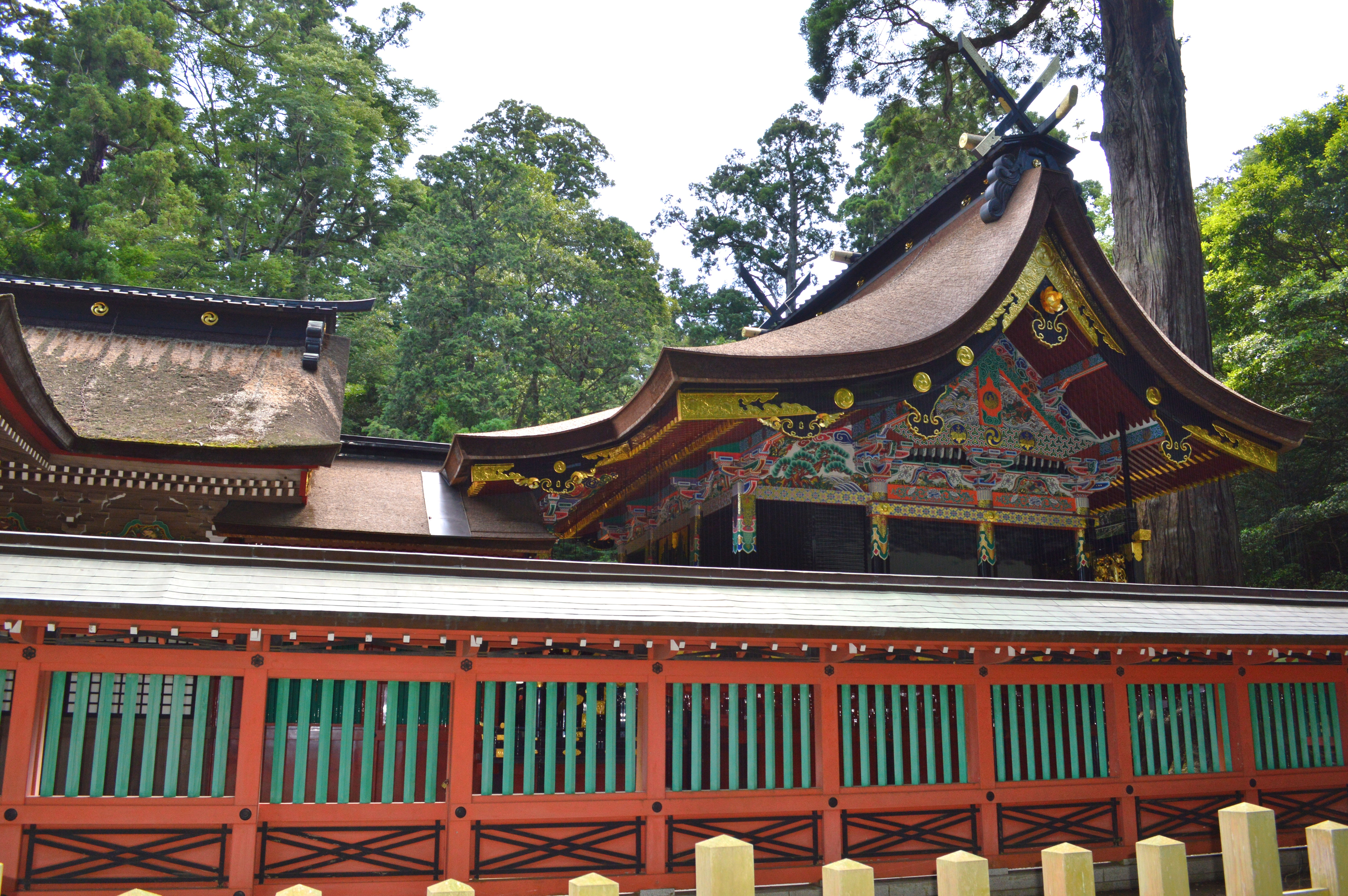
Main Shrine

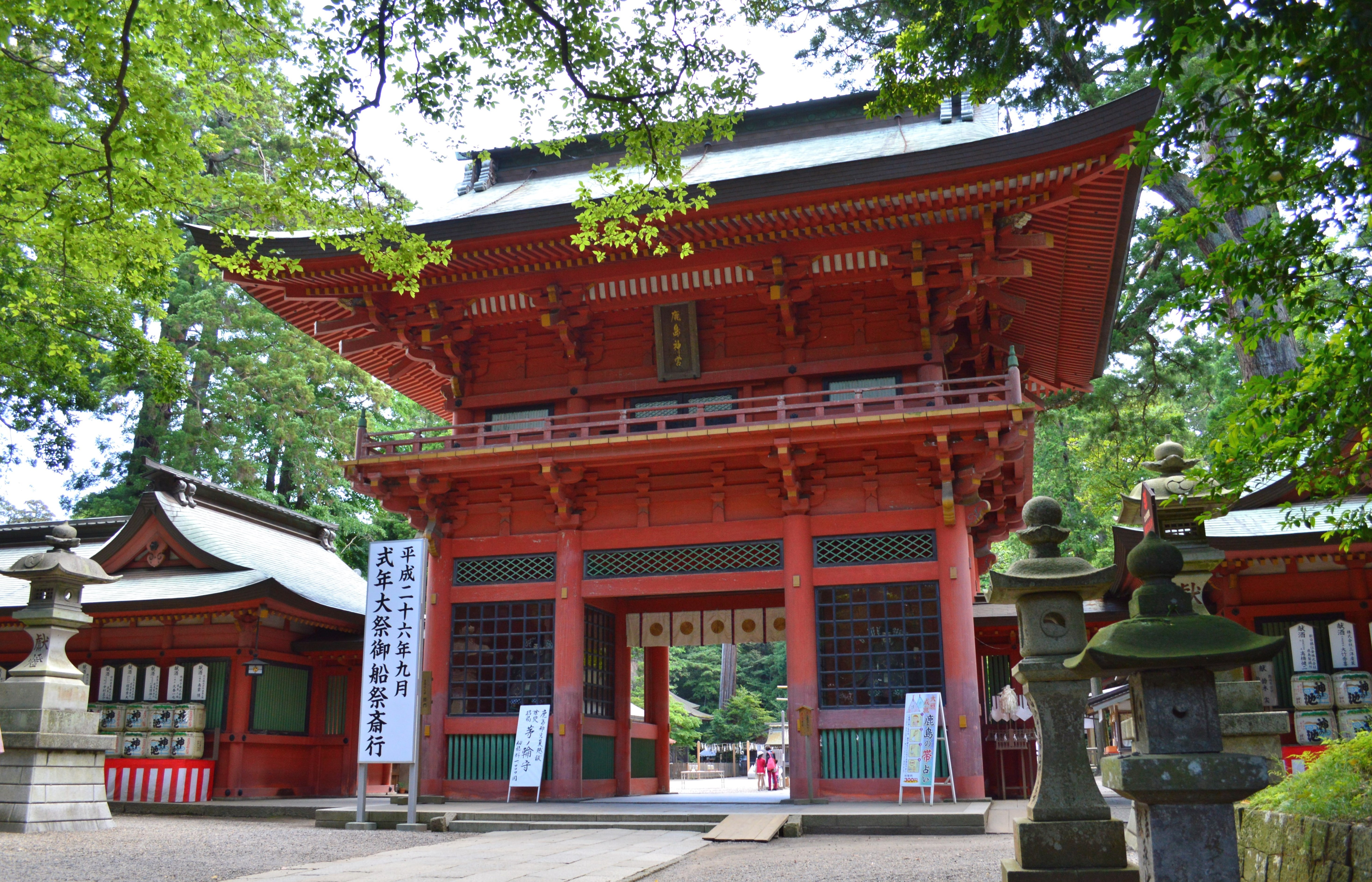
Rōmon

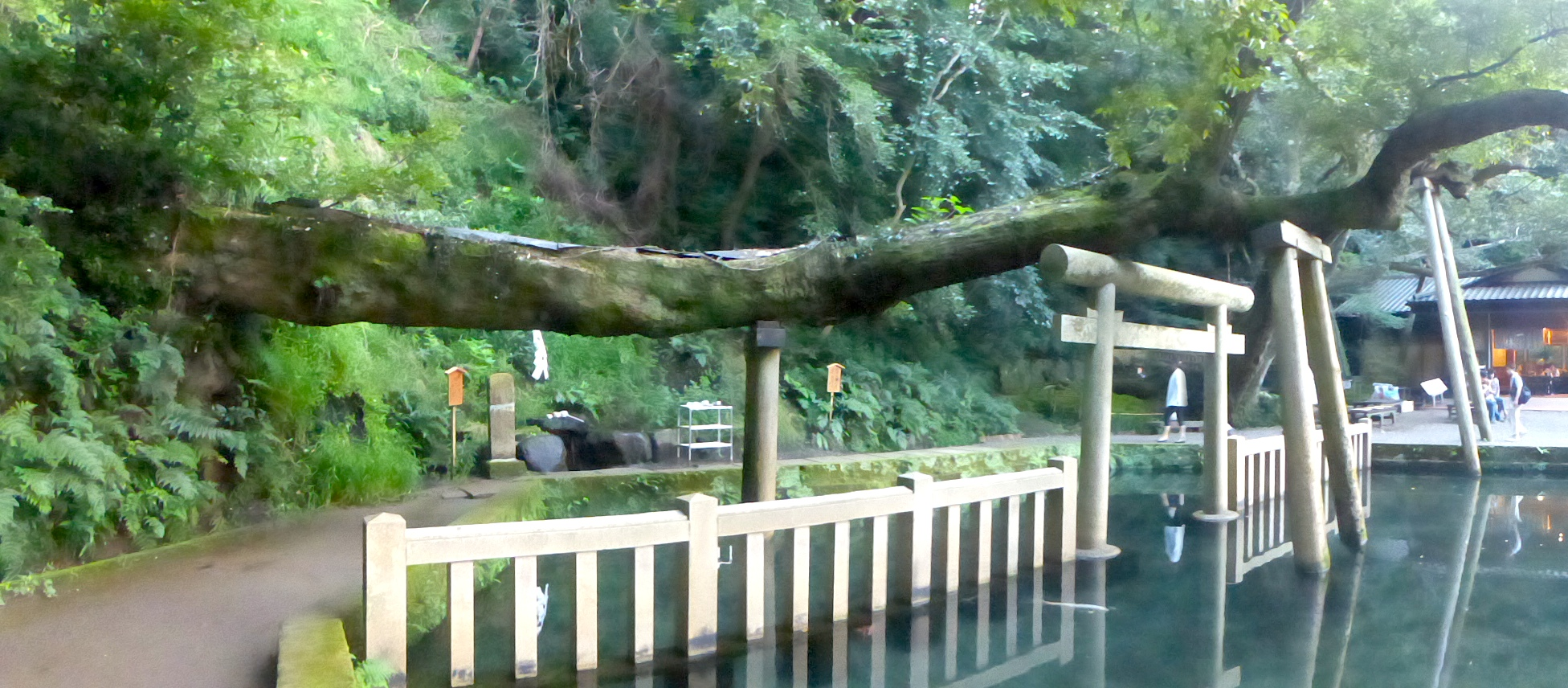
Mitarashi (御手洗池) reflecting pond, 2015

Kashima Shrine is located at the top of the Kashima plateau in south-east Ibaraki Prefecture, intersecting Lake Kitaura and Kashima Bay and in close proximity to Katori Shrine, which also has a strong connection to the martial arts. The shrine is the home of the Kashima Shintō-ryū (鹿島新当流) school of Japanese swordsmanship. Tsukahara Bokuden (塚原 卜伝; 1489 - March 6, 1571), one of the most distinguished swordmasters in Japanese history, was a frequent visitor to the shrine and developed the school from a combination of his own experiences as a shugyōsha during Musha shugyō (武者修行) and the Tenshin Shōden Katori Shintō-ryū (天真正伝香取神道流).

A large blade designated as a National Treasure known as the Futsu-no-Mitama Sword (布都御魂剣) is housed in the treasure house of Kashima Shrine.

The Honden (main shrine building), Haiden (prayer hall) and Rōmon tower gate entrance are all Edo period structures, and are National Important Cultural Properties. The gate is one of the largest three shrine entrances in Japan. A deer enclosure is also located down the forest path. Both Kashima Shrine's deer and those of Nara are considered messengers of the gods and hence share a strong connection.

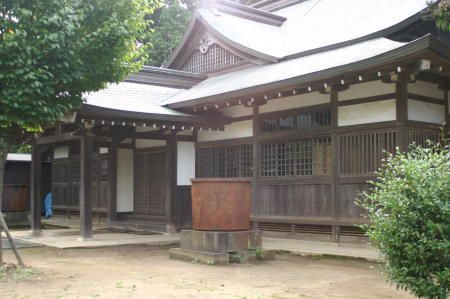
Dojo inside Kashima Shrine, 2005

== Enshrined deity ==
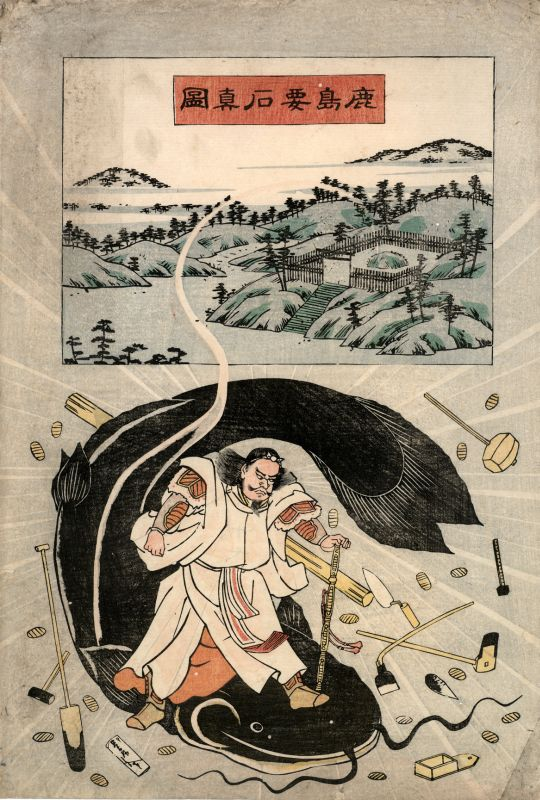
「Kashima Keystone」(Ansei Era, 1855) The upper section of this illustration shows the stone in Kashima Shrine while below the god Takemikazuchi is pinning the giant catfish Ōnamazu with his sword. Ōnamazu (大鯰) is said to live below the islands of Japan and when aggravated is the cause of its many earthquakes. Takemikazuchi restrains the catfish through the use of the keystone.

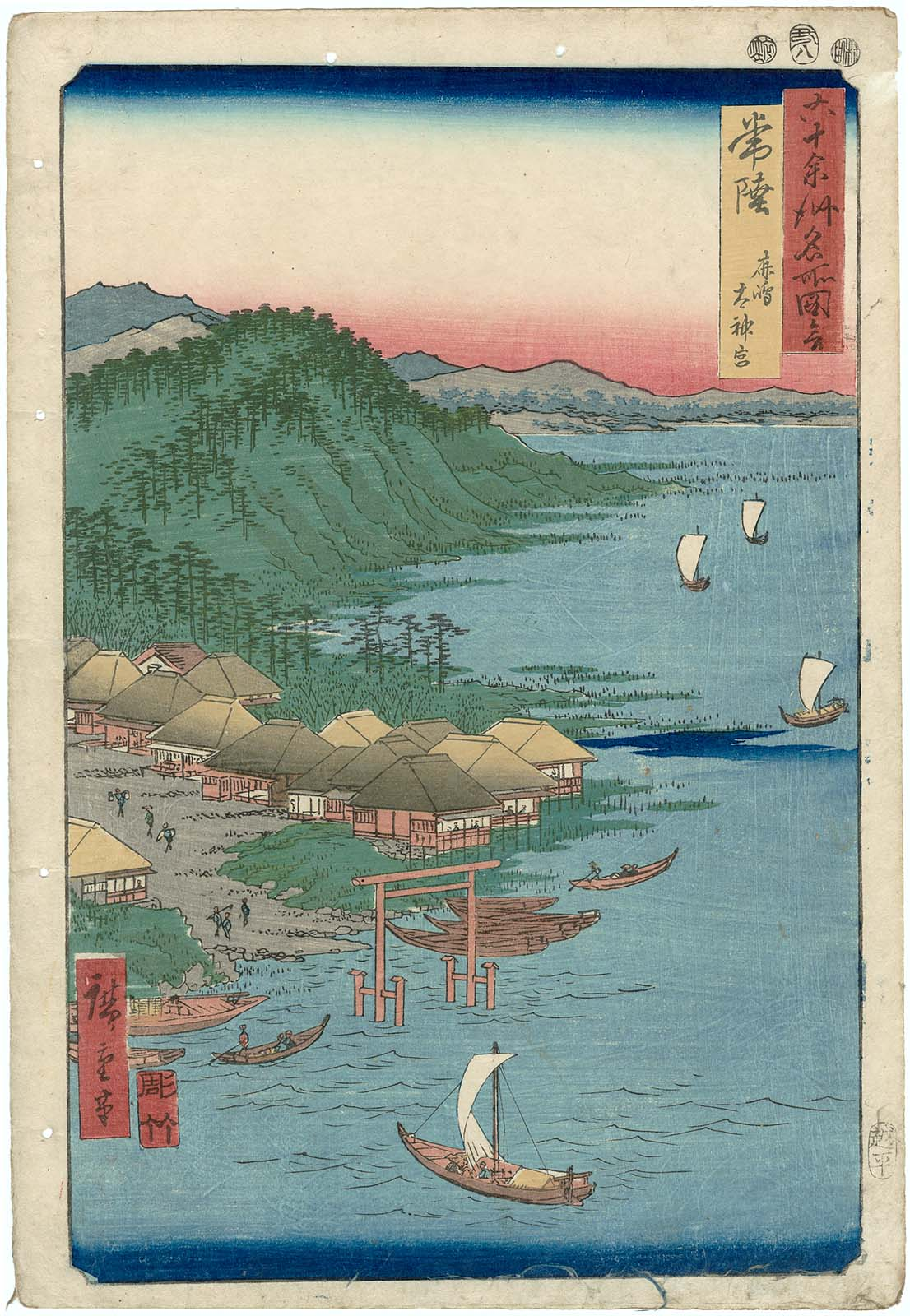
Hiroshige

Kashima Ōkami (鹿島大神, Kashima-no-Ōkami) is the official title of the main enshrined deity and identified as Takemikazuchi (武甕槌大神). In some historical texts he is also known as the great god of thunder.

According to legend, Izanagi, beheaded his own son Kagutsuchi the fire deity, as punishment for burning his mother to death. As he performed the act the blood dripped from his sword splashing onto the rocks below him, giving birth to several kami, two of which were Takemikazuchi along with Futsunushi (経津主神, Futsunushi-no-kami) the deity of Katori Shrine. Per the Nihon Shoki, Takemikazuchi was the deity who provided Emperor Jimmu with a sword as he departed for the conquest of Yamato, which is one reason the shrine is regarded as a patron. However, there is no mention of the shrine in either the Nihon Shoki or the Kojiki and the earliest written records, the Hitachi Fudoki, does not identify the Kashima-no-Ōkami with Takemikazuchi.

== History ==
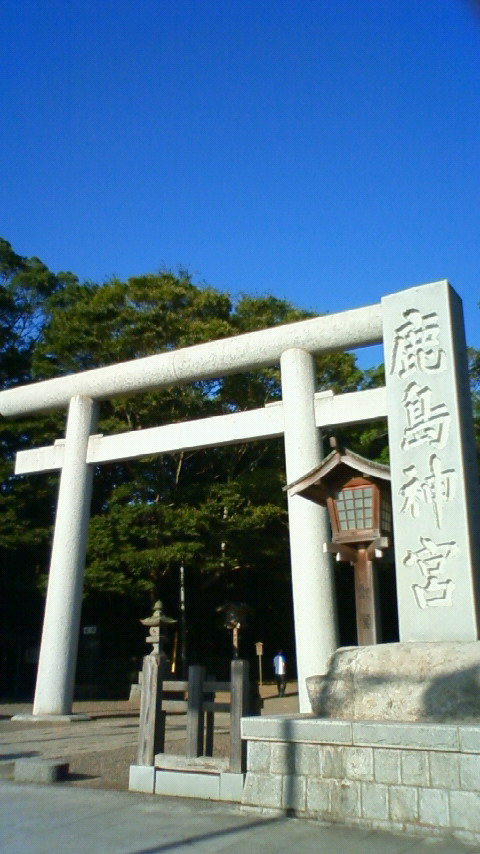
The Torii Gate in 2008 before the 2011 earthquake

According the shrine legend, Kashima Jingū was established in the first year of the legendary Emperor Jimmu, i.e. 660 BC. This is well into Japanese prehistory, and the oldest written records mentioning the shrine are in the Asuka period Fudoki (風土記) of Hitachi province, indicating that a kobe (神戸), or private house of ritual was rebuilt in 649 AD on a site where the great celestial god Kashima (香島の天の大神, Kashima-no-ten-no-Ōkami) descended from the heavens and where religious ceremonies and festivals had been held since the time of Emperor Sujin, Yamato Takeru and Emperor Tenji. This region was the ancestral stronghold of the Nakatomi clan, who were strongly allied to the imperial court, and the area around Kashima became a center for strengthening the imperial court's control of eastern Japan following the Taika Reform. As both a war deity and a water deity, the Kashima kami were connected with military campaigns against the Emishi tribes of northern Japan. The treasury of the shrine has a one bucket said to have been a war trophy once owned by the Emishi leader Aterui.

During the Nara period, the Nakatomi clan rose to prominence and changed their name to Fujiwara and played a central role in reorganizing the Shinto ritual system. By the Heian period, Kashima Jingū was given the highest rank and the Shinto hierarchy, along with Ise Grand Shrine and Katori Shrine. The Engishiki records list the shrine as the ichinomiya of Hitachi Province. Although the Fujiwara clan lost much of its power into the Kamakura period, the shrine continued to enjoy high status and prestige with the warrior class and was strongly supported by successive samurai governments and local daimyō. Minamoto no Yoritomo granted the shrine numerous estates, and many members of the samurai class entered the priesthood, sometimes advancing to very senior positions. The shrine buildings were extensively reconstructed during the early Edo period, with Tokugawa Ieyasu sponsoring the reconstruction of the main shrine in 1605 (currently the main building of the Oku-no-miya Shrine), Tokugawa Hidetada rebuilding the current main shrines in 1619 and with Tokugawa Yorifusa contributing the tower gate in 1634. In 1687, poet Matsuo Bashō traveled to the Kashima Shrine, writing of the journey in his haibun travel journal, Kashima Kikō.

Following the Meiji restoration, the shrine was designated a Kanpei-sha (官幣社), or imperial shrine, 1st rank, under State Shinto. The second torii gate was rebuilt in granite from Kasama in 1968 to celebrate the 100th anniversary of the Meiji restoration. The precincts of the shrine were designated a National Historic Site in 1986.

The shrine suffered only moderate damage in the 2011 Tōhoku earthquake. The main torii gate was destroyed and 64 of the stone lanterns lining the shrine's pathways fell over. Although none of the main buildings were destroyed, the total cost of repairing the structures came to 170 million Yen. Following the earthquake, the first large scale archaeological excavation ever made on the site was conducted in the northwestern side of the precincts. Many artifacts dating back to the Nara period were uncovered.

== Grand Imperial Ofuna Festival ==
This special festival held once every 12 years in the Year of the Horse is to honour the great deities Takemikazuchi of Kashima Shrine and Futsunushi of Katori Shrine. The festival is one of great pride for the people in the areas of Kashima and Katori and said to be one of the biggest in Japan. The next Grand Imperial Ofuna Festival will be in 2026.

The festival began during the time of Emperor Ōjin although it was stopped once during the civil warring of the Muromachi period . In 1870, the tradition of the festival was revived and given imperial status. In 1887 it was decided that the festival would be held every 12 years in the Year of the Horse.

Today the Grand Imperial Ofuna festival begins in the morning on the first of September and officials from the imperial court are sent to convey the blessings of the Emperor. In the early morning of the second day a mikoshi (portable shrine) from Kashima Shrine is carried overland along the edge of Lake Kitaura, a smaller part of Lake Kasumigaura, to a large boat waiting in the harbor. The boat, adorned with a great Ryūtō (龍頭) dragon motif, then joins a larger fleet of other colourful boats (in 2002 there were around 90) and carries the mikoshi across the lake to the other side. From there a divine procession awaits to take the mikoshi to Katori Shrine where the main festival takes place. After the festival a special temporary logging known as an Angu (行宮) is constructed and the Mikoshi is taken there before being returned to its main shrine in the afternoon of the third day.

== Festivals and annual events ==
January

- New Years Day Service (1st, 06:00)
- Festival of Origins (3rd, 10:00)
- White Horse Festival (7th, 18:00)

February

- Setsubun Festival (Setsubun Day, 18:00)
- Kigen Era Festival (11th, 10:00)
- Bountiful Crops Festival (17th, 10:00)

March

- Saitousai Main Festival of Colour (9th, 10:00)
- Spring Festival (9th, 18:00)
- Spring Equinox and Spirits of the Ancestors Festival (Spring Equinox Day, 10:00)

April

- Rear Shrine Spring Service (1st, 10:00)
- Inner Shrine Spring Service (2nd)
- Shrine Ruins Spring Service (3rd)
- Sakado and Numao Shrine Spring Service (4th)
- Outer Shrine Spring Service (5th)
- Outer Shrine Divine Spring Service (6th)
- Ikisu Shrine Annual Spring Service (14th)

May

- Bountiful Harvest and Horseback Archery Festival (1st, 13:00)

June

- Summer Solstice Purification Ceremony (29th, 18:00)
- Ōharai Shinto Purification Ceremony (30th, 15:00)

September

- Grand Imperial Ofuna Festival (1st–3rd, in 2014)
- Annual Shrine Festival (1st, 10:00)
- Chinese Lantern Festival (1st, 18:00)
- Fortune Festival (1st, 20:00)
- Return of the Deities Festival (2nd, 15:00)
- Xinggong Angu Imperial Logging Festival (2nd, 22:00)
- Enshrinement of the Ancestors Festival (21st, 18:00)
- Autumn Equinox Festival (22nd, 08:00)
- Great Festival of Ancestral Spirits (22nd, 08:00)

October

- Offering of the Harvest Festival (17th, 10:00)

November

- Rear Shrine Autumn Service (1st, 10:00)
- Inner Shrine Autumn Service (2nd)
- Meiji Festival (3rd, 09:00)
- Sumo Festival (3rd, 10:00)
- Shrine Ruins Autumn Service (3rd)
- Sakado and Numao Shrine Autumn Service (4th)
- Outer Shrine Autumn Service (5th)
- Outer Shrine Autumn Service (6th)
- Ikisu Shrine Autumn Service (13th)
- Shinjyosai Offering of the Harvest to the gods (23rd, 10:00)

December

- Shrine Offerings Ceremony (20th, 10:00)
- Tencho Festival (23rd, 10:00)
- Shinto Purification Ceremony (31st, 15:00)
- New Year's Eve Service (31st, 15:00)

Monthly service

- Ceremony for the Ancestors (1st day of each month, 10:00)

== See also ==
- List of National Treasures of Japan (crafts-swords)
- Kashima-Shinryu
- Kashima Shinden Jikishinkage-ryu
- Kashima Shinto-ryu
- Kashima Antlers
- Deer (mythology)
- List of Jingū
- List of Historic Sites of Japan (Ibaraki)
