= Kashima Kikō =

Haibun travel journal

- by Matsuo Bashō
- Original title: 鹿島紀行
- Written: 1687, Edo period
- Language: Japanese
- Genre: Travel literature
- Form: Haibun

Kashima Kikō ((鹿島紀行), variously translated as Kashima Journal or A Visit to Kashima Shrine is a haibun travel journal by the Japanese poet Matsuo Bashō, covering his short journey to Kashima Shrine in the Kantō region. According to write-translator David Landis Barnhill, the Kashima Kikō is "most significant for the amusing but complex self-image near the beginning" where Bashō compares his companions to a bird and a mouse before calling himself a mixture of both: a bat.

It was written as a tribute to Bashō's Zen master, Buchhō, and so it contains direct references to enlightenment and the Gateless Gate. The work mostly does not integrate poems into the prose and, instead, presents all the prose in the first half before ending with a series of hokku written by Bashō and his friends.

== Summary ==
Written in October of 1687 (Edo era), the work covers a 45-year old Bashō's journey to Kashima Shrine to see the harvest moon. The journal is inspired by a poem from Teishitsu of Kyoto, imagining the exiled Ariwara no Yukihira viewing the Moon. Traveling with a monk and the ex-samurai, Sora (who later accompanied Bashō on most of his Oku no Hosomichi journey), Bashō and company board a boat, hire a horse, and pause to view Mount Tsukuba. After lodging in a fisherman's hut, the trio embark to Kashima but are met with incessant rain. Spending the night at an old priest's home, Bashō wakes at the flush of dawn and rouses the others to see the Moon breaking through the storm clouds.

== English translations ==
- Matsuo, Bashō (1966). The Narrow Road to the Deep North and Other Travel Sketches. trans. Nobuyuki Yuasa. Harmondsworth: Penguin. ISBN 978-0-14-044185-7. OCLC 469779524.
- Matsuo, Bashō (1999). The Essential Bashō. trans. Sam Hamill. Boston: Shambhala. ISBN 978-1-57062-282-3.
- Matsuo, Bashō (2000). Narrow Road to the Interior and Other Writings. trans. Sam Hamill. Boston: Shambhala. ISBN 978-1-57062-716-3.
- Matsuo, Bashō (2005). Bashō's Journey: Selected Literary Prose by Matsuo Bashō. trans. David Landis Barnhill. Albany, NY: State University of New York Press. ISBN 978-0-7914-6414-4.
