= Morikawa Kyoriku =

Japanese haiku poet

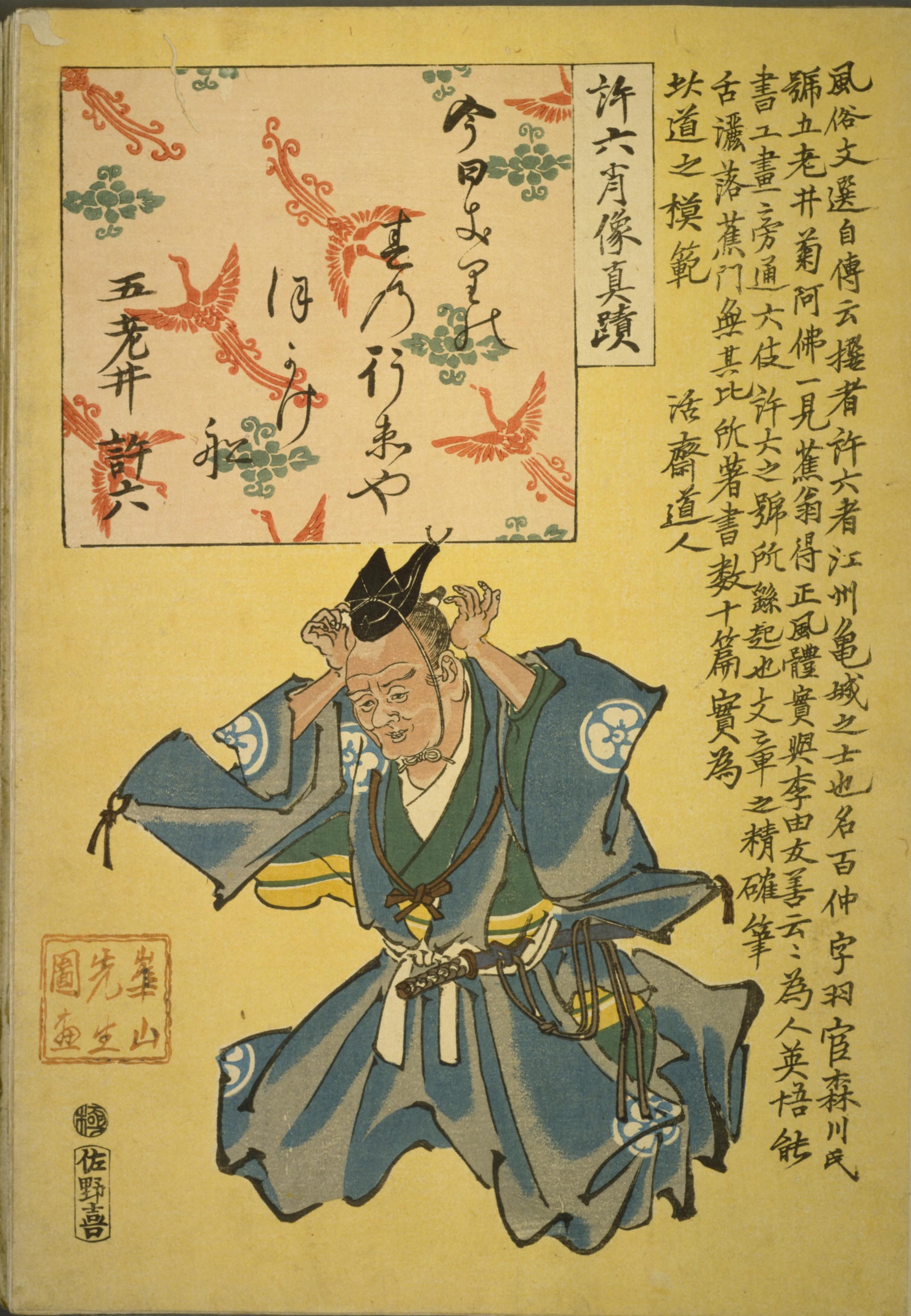
Morikawa Kyoriku by Watanabe Kazan

Morikawa Kyoriku (森川許六, also spelled Kyoroku; born October 1, 1656 in Ōmi Province; died September 23, 1715) was a Japanese haiku poet of the early Edo period.

== Life and works ==
Morikawa Kyoriku was a samurai of the Hikone Domain in Ōmi Province (now Shiga Prefecture) with an income of 300 koku. He first met the haiku master Matsuo Bashō in August 1692 while on duty in Edo. When he showed Bashō several haiku at that time, Bashō praised one haiku in particular: "Autumn wind in which ten dumplings do not shrink." (十団子も小粒になりぬ秋の風) The Kyoraisho (去来抄), a work about the haiku poet Mukai Kyorai, also states that Bashō held this haiku in high esteem. Afterwards, during the nine months until he returned to his hometown in May of the following year, Morikawa frequently visited Bashō in his free time and received direct instruction. Bashō also visited Morikawa's lodgings several times.

Morikawa was skilled in painting, and it seems that Bashō received painting lessons while teaching renku. In any case, Bashō called Morikawa his master in painting, writing "In painting you were my teacher; in poetry I taught you and you were my disciple. My teacher's paintings are imbued with such profundity of spirit and executed with such marvelous dexterity that I could never approach their mysterious depths." After returning to his hometown, Morikawa never had the opportunity to meet Bashō again. But it seems that he was convinced that he had already learned the essence of renku in the Bashō style during this time.

It is said that Morikawa was also enthusiastic about martial arts, the art of the samurai, and was skilled with spears, swords, and horses. However, he was not blessed with good health, as the picture by Watanabe Kazan seems to indicate. Even in poor health, however, Morikawa did not lose his pride and spirit as a samurai. He left the world with the farewell message: "I thought I would die a clumsy one, but I will die well if I am good." (下手ばかり死ぬる事ぞとおもひしに上手も死ねばくそ上手なり)

Morikawa left behind illustrated works such as Oku no Hosomichi angya-zō (奥の細道行脚像), an illustrated edition of Oku no Hosomichi. He is counted among the "Ten Best Students of Bashō" (蕉門十哲).
