= Sora's Diary =

Sora Tabi Nikki
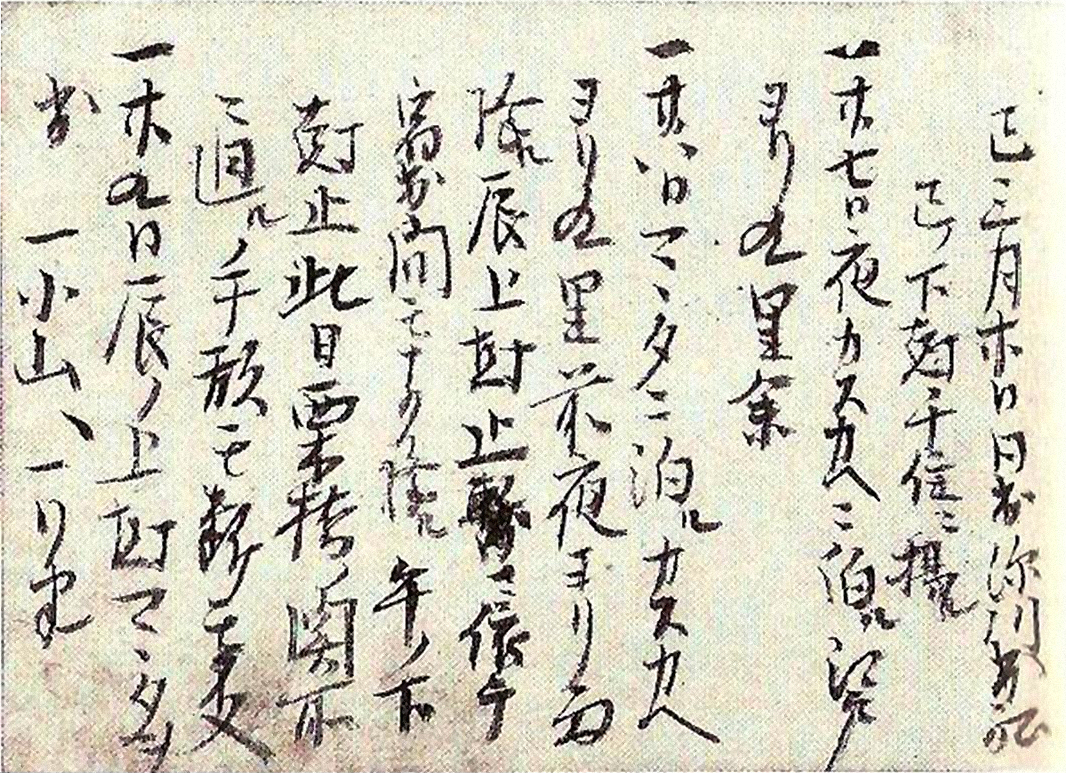
- The handwritten diary of Kawai Sora
- Author: Kawai Sora
- Original title: 曾良旅日記
- Language: Japanese
- Publication place: Japan

The Sora Tabi Nikki (曾良旅日記; 'Travel Diary of Sora') was the memorandum of Kawai Sora in 1689 and 1691 when he accompanied Matsuo Bashō on the journeys recounted in Oku no Hosomichi, for which it has become an important study tool. By the time it was re-discovered in 1943, the presence of this diary had been doubted.

== The diary ==
The existence of this diary had been known and it was re-discovered and published by Yasusaburo Yamamoto in 1943. It was designated an Important Cultural Property of Japan on June 15, 1978. The diary was 11 cm in length, 16.5 cm in width and 2 cm in thickness; the book cover was indigo and the volume contained 100 sheets of paper, including 4 white sheets. There were 11 sheets of paper pasted. For convenience, it has been divided into parts: Summary of Divine Names of Engishiki, Memorandum of Utamakura, Diary of Genroku 2nd year, Diary of Genroku 4th year, Memorandum of Haiku and Others. Inside the diary, there were no such divisions. The diary was called also Sora Nikki (Sora Diary) and Zuiko Nikki (Diary of Sora accompanying Basho). In the diary, there were no emotional sentences such as seen in Oku no Hosomichi. The names of lands visited and the distances between places were recorded precisely. Donald Keene compared this diary to the diary of François-René de Chateaubriand, namely exactly recording the data of the trip by Julian who accompanied his master. The recording of time in the middle of Edo era in this diary is noted as most exact one. It was shown in Earthly Branches and the time was shown in three divisions. He wrote that while they worshiped at shrines or prayed before shrines, they only visited or saw temples, indicating that he was an earnest Shintoist.

Engishiki Shinmeicho (List of kami)
Engishiki: This was a list of kami by Sora, who studied Shinto under Yoshikawa Koretari (1616–1695) in preparation for their travels. It occupies the beginning of the diary, up to the halfway point of the 12th sheet of paper.
Utamakura memorandum
In preparation for the trip, he wrote an utamakura memorandum based on the Ruiji Meisho Wakashū and Narayama Shūyō. It consumes 8 sheets, starting on the back of the 12th sheet. Findings in the trip were added between the lines. One sheet of paper was pasted. This is also called the "Meishō Memorandum".
1689 diary

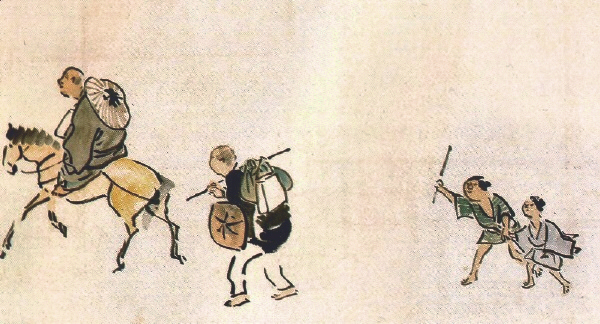
Basho on the horseback, followed by Sora in Okuno Hosomichi Emaki, of Yosa Buson (Note: Yosa Buson drew an illustration of Oku no hosomichi showing Basho on the horseback accompanied by Sora. This diary was of the trip shown in Buson's illustration.)

On 33 and a half sheets of paper, it begins with the two leaving Fukagawa in Edo in March during the second year of Genroku, and ends with Sora departing for Ise and Nagashima on August 5. Between these two events, Sora recorded everything in the journey, including the real dates, weather, schedule, and stays in inns. This has become an important document for the study of Oku no Hosomichi. On September 3, Sora rejoined Basho at Ogaki, and the two returned to Fukagawa on November 13. Sora recorded details of the trip.
1691 diary
Sora started on March 4, 1691 and arrived at Nagashima on July 25. This diary is also called the Kinki Area Journey Diary. Starting at the latter half of the 1689 diary, the diary was described for 23 sheets of paper to Haikai Kakidome. Most were on his visits to shrines and temples at Yoshino, Koyasan. Kumano, Wakaura, Suma, Akashi. He recorded the shrines and temples and Utamakura. He visited Basho who was staying at Sagaraku Kakisha, and recorded Basho and his disciples who were editing Sarumino.
Haikai Kakidome
Haikai Kakidome recorded the hokku (starting verse of a renku) and haikus of Basho and Sora during their journey and the haiku meetings during their journey. This is an important document in order to know the original form of their haikus.
Zatsuroku (trivia)
On the Japanese archery, anecdotes on Teishitsu which Sora recorded at Yamanaka Spa, names and addresses of persons Sora and Basho met on their journeys, old haikus; these were jotted down.

== History prior to rediscovery ==
The original book had been present together with a copied manuscript of Oku no Hosomichi called Sora Hon in the same box made of paulownia wood. This book was in the hand of Sugiyama Sanpū who was a close friend of Sora when Sora died in Iki Island, now Nagasaki Prefecture. Shikōbō Hakushū, who was a brother-in-law of Sansha, a son of Sugiyama Sanpū, wrote that Sanpū possessed this book. This book was sent to Takano Family where Sora was born. When the Takano Family ended, this book was under the control of Kasai Family, who was the family of the mother of Sora. Kasai Shūtoku, of the Kasai Family, was married with the daughter of one elder sister of Sora. He respected Sora. He edited a book Yukimaruke concerning Sora from various documents of Sora. Later the book went to Kubojima Wakōdo. Chikurinsha Atsujin of Sendai wrote Wakōdo had originally retained the Diary of Sora.Roinsha Chikusai wrote in his book the map of Sendai in Sora's diary and a line of July 20, 1689 were transcribed at the Wakodo's house. According to a Journal of History of Suwa in 1967, the diary of Sora was illegally taken away from the Kasai Family. Namely Wakōdo defrauded the Kasai Family of Sora's diary. Wakōdo bought 8 items of Kasai Family including the diary at 58 ryō Tael but paid only 10 ryō. Wakōdo was punished by the Takashima han, but the diary was not returned. On the original box, there was a formal letter of transfer of the original Okuno Hosomichi and Sora's diary by the name of Wakōdo. Later Matsudaira Shimanokami, one of the daimyō, bought the box. Honma Keishi attested to it. On the Sora's diary, fragments of documents were occasionally seen. For instance, Yawatei Ukō wrote the summary of the Diary from April 21 at Shirakawa to May 9 at Matsushima in Aokage Shū. Asukaen Issō wrote the summary from the start to May 17 at Obanazawa.

== Rediscovery ==
In Meiji years, the book was possessed by Kuwahara Shinzō of Osaka, which went to Saitō Ikuta of Itō, who had been a famous collector of classical fine arts. It was passed to Saitō Hirosuke. Yamamoto Yasusaburō heard of it and with the introduction of Satō Seiiji, he witnessed the airing of summer in 1938. Yamamoto discovered the Diary of Sora among other items of classical fine arts. He published the Diary under the title of the Sora's Diary of Oku no Hoshomichi accompanying Bashō, with the 1791 Diary at the Ogawa Shoten in July 1943. Incidentally, this year was the 250th birthday year of Basho's death and the 300th anniversary of the birth of Basho. The second printing was made in December of the same year, and the third printing was in September 1944. The 4th printing was made in 1946. Shōichirō Sugiura visited Hirosuke Saitō, the owner living at Uemeguro, with Saburō Miyamoto and examined the Diary on November 5, 1950. Sugiura's original idea was to obtain the Diary in Wataya Bunko of Tenri Library, however, it was not realized. In the course of time, Shōichirō Sugiura had to possess the Diary. He wrote in the first issue of Renga Haikai Kenkyu that this Diary should be studied by researchers and obtained it. After his death, the Diary was presented to the Wataya Bunko of Tenri Library by his wife in February 1959.

=== Two manuscripts discovered ===
In 1951, two manuscripts were discovered. One was in the possession of kan-nushi Nasu -Onsen-Jinja, called Giyu Hitomi, and the diary is called Hitomi-Book, and the other is in the possession of Oyamada Family, and the diary is called Oyamada-Book.

== Contribution to the study of Oku no Hosomichi ==
Prior to the rediscovery of Sora's diary, studies on Oku no Hosomichi were based on indirect findings. After the re-discovery, Sora's diary has become indispensable, for instance, one should read the Haikai Kakidome for the beginning Hokku.

Yamamoto wrote in the beginning of his book that "If this diary still exists today in a complete state, it is a miracle beyond my comprehension. For the approximately 250 years from the trip to the narrow road of Oku until today, in spite of there being enough distinguished writings on Basho to make an ox sweat to carry them or to fill a library to the rafters, this [diary] still represents a historical document the likes of which has never seen the light of day."

Shida Gishu was asked to write a preface of Yamamoto's book and wrote that this diary would contribute greatly to the study of Oku no Hosomichi, and every study would contribute to the proof of this diary and attested to the real writings of Sora with various examples of proof. The publication of Sora's diary produced problems of discrepancies between the Basho's Oku no Hosomichi and the Sora's descriptions. Prior to the discovery of the diary, Shida had pointed out that not all recorded in the Oku no Hosomichi was necessarily true and that there were examples of fabrications. This problem had been under dispute in 1951 in the Kokubungaku, Kaishaku to Kansho. Toyotaka Komiya supported Basho stating there were no intentional fabrications, but most researchers such as Sugiura, Noichi Imoto, Kisao Abe studied minutely; the academic circle was in favor of the fabrications. Yamamoto's original book contains mistakes and misprintings. Sugiura showed a corrected diary.

Thereafter, there have been several books on the corrected Sora's diary. Atsuko Kanamori, a Japanese historian, tried to explore the Sora's diary by studying the references and travelling on the route herself. She concluded that the length of the journey was really only 450 ri (around 720 miles). She counted the time of every part in the diary, and studied especially the entry into and leaving the checking stations of the hans, for instance, the Sendai Domain at that time and how they managed local haiku poets. The original hope of Basho had been to see the cherry blossoms of Shiogama, Miyagi ; however, this was almost impossible, taking Basho's health into account. Sora was appointed to be Basho's travelling companion, and studied the places of previously composed famous Japanese tankas. This made this journey successful.
