= Nozarashi Kikō =

1684 travel journal written by Matsuo Basho

- by Matsuo Bashō
- Original title: 野ざらし紀行
- Written: 17th century, Edo period
- Language: Japanese
- Genre: Travel literature
- Form: Haibun

Nozarashi Kikō (野ざらし紀行), variously translated as The Records of a Weather-Exposed Skeleton or Travelogue of Weather-Beaten Bones, is the first travel journal haibun by the Japanese poet Matsuo Bashō. Written in the summer of 1684, the work covers Bashō's journey. According to translator Nobuyuki Yuasa, it is "the first work of Bashō where we find glimpses of his mature style."

== Background ==
In the summer of 1683 (one year before the journey), Bashō's mother died. In the following winter, Bashō's friends and disciples built a home for him in Fukagawa. On the occasion, Bashō wrote:

Overhearing the hail,
My old self sits again
In the new house,
Like an overgrown oak.

— Matsuo Bashō, transl. Nobuyuki Yuasa.

== Summary ==
In autumn of the first year of Jōkyō (1684), Bashō departed from his home. Passing Mount Fuji and walking along the Fuji River, Bashō finds an abandoned infant, tossing some food to the child before moving on. Further stops include the Ise Grand Shrine and Bashō's hometown, where he meets with relatives and mourns the loss of his mother. Next, he visits Yamato Province, Mount Futagami in the Ryōhaku Mountains, and the remains of Saigyo's hut. As the text progresses, the journaling prose is replaced by a series of poems.

== English translations ==
- Matsuo, Bashō (1966). The Narrow Road to the Deep North and Other Travel Sketches. trans. Nobuyuki Yuasa. Harmondsworth: Penguin. ISBN 978-0-14-044185-7. OCLC 469779524.
- Matsuo, Bashō (1999). The Essential Bashō. trans. Sam Hamill. Boston: Shambhala. ISBN 978-1-57062-282-3.
- Matsuo, Bashō (2000). Narrow Road to the Interior and Other Writings. trans. Sam Hamill. Boston: Shambhala. ISBN 978-1-57062-716-3.
- Matsuo, Bashō (2005). Bashō's Journey: Selected Literary Prose by Matsuo Bashō. trans. David Landis Barnhill. Albany, NY: State University of New York Press. ISBN 978-0-7914-6414-4.
