= Tsukahara Bokuden =

Japanese samurai

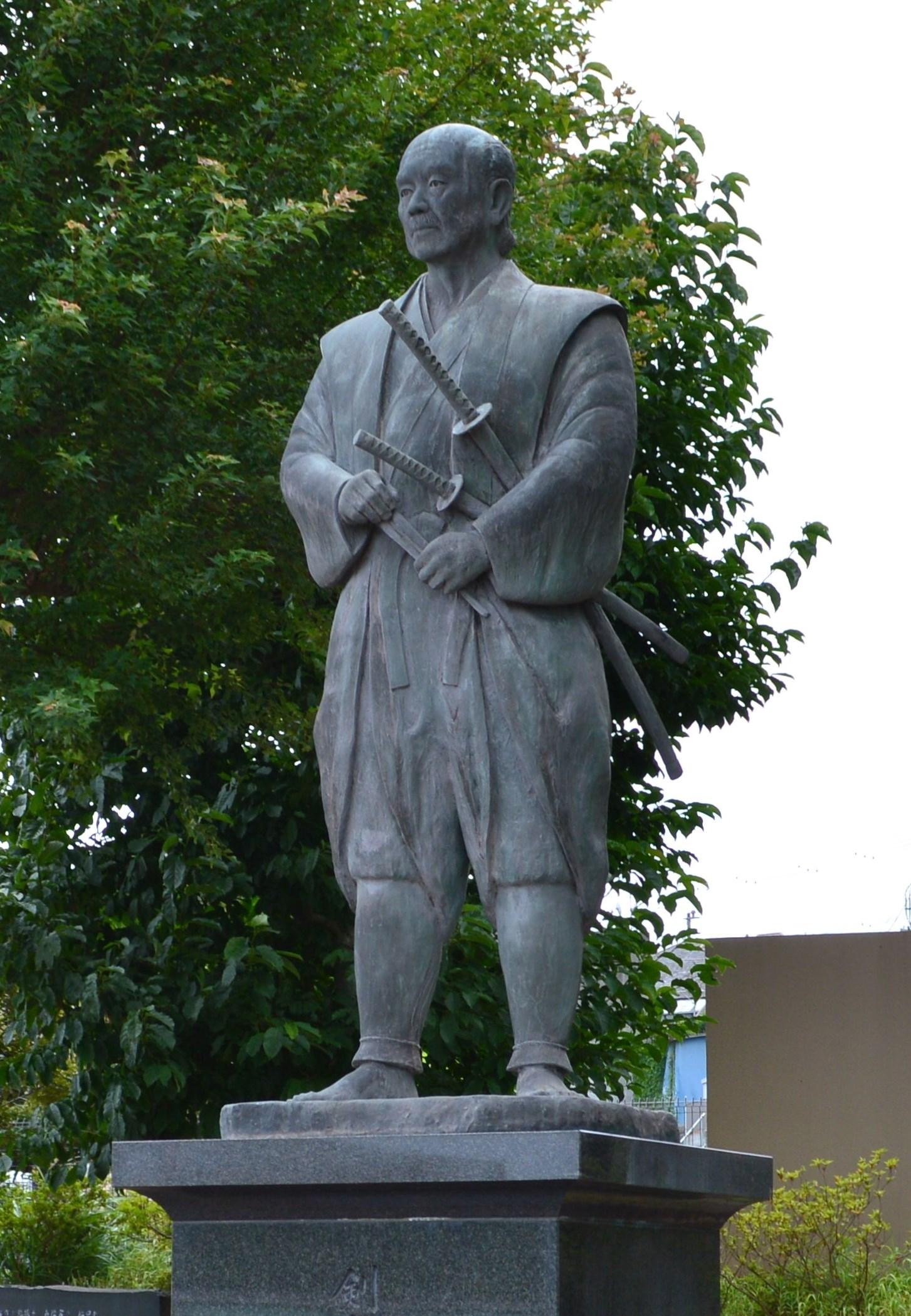
- Statue of Tsukahara Bokuden (Kashima City, Ibaraki Prefecture)
- Born: Tsukahara Shin'emon Takamoto c. 1489, first year of Entoku; Hitachi Province (now Ibaraki prefecture), Japan
- Died: 11 February 1571 (aged 81–82), Genki (era); Kashima (now Kashima City), Hitachi Province, Japan
- Native name: 塚原 卜伝
- Other names: Yoshikawa Asako (infant name) → Tsukahara Takami (塚原高幹?) → Buden (number)
- Style: Kashima style of kenjutsu

Other information
- Children: Mikishige (幹重) son
- Notable students: Ashikaga Yoshiteru; Kitabatake Tomonori; Hosokawa Fujitaka; Imagawa Ujizane; Kamiizumi Nobutsuna; Yamamoto Kansuke and more.

Japanese name
- Kanji: 塚原 卜伝
- Hiragana: つかはら ぼくでん
Transcriptions
- Romanization: Tsukahara Bokuden

Tsukahara Bokuden (塚原 卜伝; 1489 – March 6, 1571) was a swordsman of the early Sengoku period. He was described as a kensei (sword saint). He was the founder of a new Kashima style of kenjutsu, and served as an instructor of Shōgun Ashikaga Yoshiteru and Ise provincial governor daimyō Kitabatake Tomonori.

== Early life ==
Bokuden was born into the Yoshikawa family within the Hitachi Province of Honshu. The family was one of four Karō families serving the Kashima clan; one of the cadet branches of the Imperial House of Japan (descendants of the Imperial Prince Kazurahara (葛原親王; 786–853)). Bokuden was adopted by the Tsukahara family, an offshoot of the Kashima clan; he was styled as Tsukahara Bokuden Takamoto. Earlier in his life, his name was Tsukahara Shin'emon Takamoto.

== Career ==
Bokuden learned the Tenshin Shōden Katori Shintō-ryū from his adopted father and later honed his skills by engaging in musha shugyō (warrior's ascetic training), traveling throughout Japan and training with most of the skillful and knowledgeable swordsmen of the day. Tsukahara Bokuden was the classic knight-errant; a rich nobleman, he travelled the Japanese countryside, often with a full entourage. He later systematized the teaching of the Kashima area's local martial arts, including such approaches to combat as Kashima no tachi and Ichi no tachi. After allegedly receiving a divine inspiration from Takemikazuchi no kami, the deity of Kashima Shrine, he named his martial system as Kashima Shintō-ryū. He also, for a brief period, called his system Mutekatsu-ryū ("winning without hands").

In one anecdote recorded in the Kōyō Gunkan, Bokuden was challenged by a mannerless ruffian. When asked about his style, Bokuden replied that he studied the "Style of No Sword". The ruffian laughed and insultingly challenged Bokuden to fight him without a sword. Bokuden then agreed to fight the man without his sword but suggested they row out to a nearby island on Lake Biwa to avoid disturbing others. The ruffian agreed, but when he jumped from the boat to the shore of the island, drawing his blade, Bokuden pushed the boat back out, leaving the ruffian stranded on the island. Bokuden explained: "This is my no-sword school". Bruce Lee was so fond of this story, that in Enter the Dragon (1973) he teaches a bully a lesson about "Fighting without Fighting", when he offers to leave a junk and sail to an island.

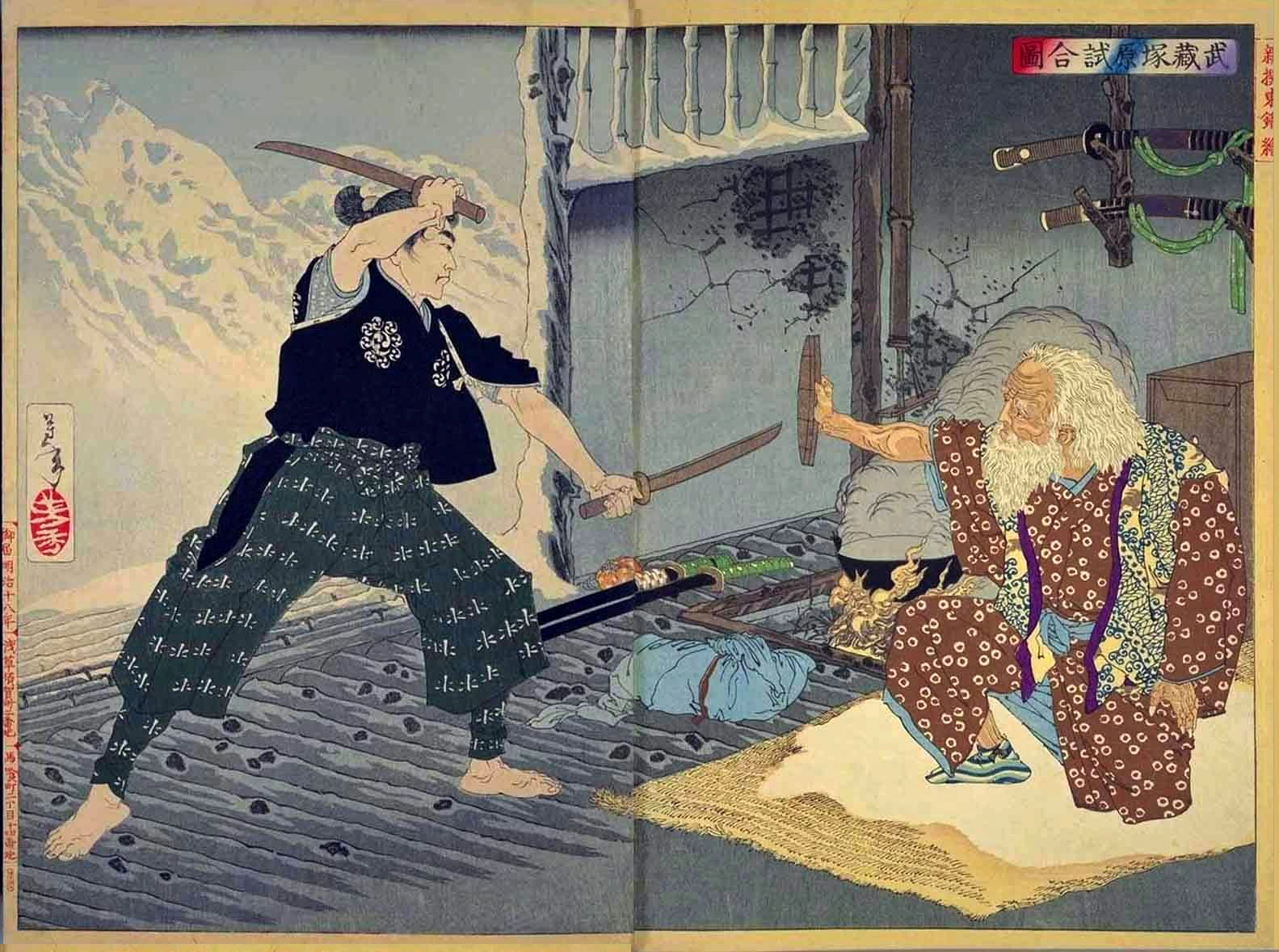
An ukiyo-e print by Yoshitoshi depicting the fictional encounter between Tsukahara Bokuden and the legendary swordsman, Miyamoto Musashi.

There is a fictional story that the young Miyamoto Musashi challenged Bokuden to a duel during a meal. When Musashi struck first, Bokuden parried the blade using the potlid from the meal as a shield (as depicted in a nishiki-e by Tsukioka Yoshitoshi). As Tsukahara Bokuden had died in 1571, 13 years before Musashi's birth in 1584, the meeting is an apocryphal myth.

According to modern Japanese author and practitioner of Japanese martial arts, Tokitsu Kenji, Tsukahara fought his first duel to the death at the age of 17. Through his lifetime, he fought another 19 duels and in 37 battles. He was wounded 6 times but only by arrows. His death toll is estimated to have been 212 kills.

== Death and legacy ==
Bokuden died of natural causes in 1571. His grave at Temple Baiko of Suga (須賀の梅香寺) is in Kashima, Ibaraki. Those devoted to the art of Japanese sword-fighting, would make pilgrimages to the Kashima Shrine because it is considered the spiritual home of kenjutsu.

== Subordinates ==
These are traditionally considered students of Bokuden:

- Ujii Shouken
- Morooka Ichiha/Ippa
- Makabe Ujimoto
- Narita Nagayasu
- Saito Denkibo
- Matsuoka Norikata
- Hayashizaki Jinsuke
- Ashikaga Yoshiteru
- Kitabatake Tomonori
- Hosokawa Fujitaka
- Imagawa Ujizane
- Kamiizumi Nobutsuna
- Yamamoto Kansuke

== In popular culture ==
=== Books ===
- Shotaro Ikenami "The Last Journey of the Bokuden" Kadokawa Group Publishing, 1980
- Yo Tsumoto " Tsukahara Uden 12th Game " Kodansha, 1983
- Gishū Nakayama "Tsukahara Bokuden" Tokuma Shoten, 1989
- Ryuichiro Mine "Nippon Kenkiden Tsukahara Uden" Shodensha, 1993
- Shotaro Ishinomori "Tsukahara Bokuden" Shogakukan, 1996
- Yukio Yahagi "Undefeated Sword Saint Tsukahara Bokuden" Kodansha, 2011

=== Movies ===
- In Akira Kurosawa’s film, Seven Samurai, the scene in which the character Gorobei’s swordsmanship skills are tested is based on an episode from Tsukahara’s life.

=== TV ===
- "Tsukahara Bokuden" (October 2nd to November 13th, 2011, NHK BS Premium Performance: Masato Sakai. The original is the above-mentioned "Twelfth Game")

Video Games

- In the video game Nioh 2, Tsukahara makes an appearance as a combat teacher. The player must beat him to unlock new skill tiers

== Bibliography ==
- Steven Turnbull: The Samurai Swordsman. Tuttle Publishing 2008, ISBN 4-8053-0956-3 (restricted online version (google books))
- Jinichi Tokeshi: Kendo: Elements, Rules and Philosophy. University of Hawaii Press 2003, ISBN 0-8248-2598-5
- Tsukahara Bokuden: The Hundred Rules of War. Createspace Independent Publishing Platform 2017, ISBN 9781548035662
