= The Seashell Game =

Poetry anthology

The Seashell Game (貝おほひ, Kai Ōi) is a 1672 anthology compiled by Japanese poet Matsuo Bashō, in which each haiku is followed by critical commentary he made as referee for a haiku contest. It is Bashō's earliest known book, and the only book he published in his own name. The work contains 60 haiku by 36 poets, including two by Bashō himself.

The format is based on a children's game where two seashells were placed side by side and compared. Bashō compares pairs of haiku by different authors in the same manner in the book. According to scholar Sam Hamill, The Seashell Game shows Bashō "to be witty, deeply knowledgeable, and rather light-hearted."

== Example ==
Bashō compares the following pair of verses on the topic of colourful autumn leaves:

How like it is to
A midwife's right hand–
Crimson maple leaf!
—Sanboku

"I haven't crimsoned.
Come and look!" So says the dew
On an oak branch
—Dasoku

In his commentary, Bashō declares that the first poem "ranks thousands of leagues" above the second.
