= Tennen Rishin-ryū =

Japanese martial art

Tennen Rishin ryu (天然理心流)
- Ko-ryū

Foundation
- Founder: Kondō Kuranosuke Nagahiro
- Date founded: c. 1789
- Period founded: Late Edo period (1603–1867)

Current information
- Current headmaster: Hirai Masato (Kondō lineage) / Ōtsuka Atsushi (Matsuzaki lineage)

Arts taught
- Art: Description
- Kenjutsu: Sword art
- Bōjutsu: Staff art
- Jūjutsu: Unarmed grappling art
- Iaijutsu: Sword drawing art

Ancestor schools
- Kashima Shintō-ryū

Descendant schools
- None identified

Tennen Rishin-ryū (天然理心流) is a Japanese martial art, commonly known as the style practiced by several core members of the Shinsengumi.

== Origins ==
The Tennen Rishin ryu is a traditional swordsmanship school, codified during the Kansei Era (1789–1801) by Kondō Kuranosuke Nagahiro (or Nagamichi). There is limited information in regards to him: he came from Tōtōmi Province (today's western Shizuoka Prefecture), but no one knows when he was born. He visited many provinces for his musha shugyō, eventually becoming a member of the Kashima Shintō-ryū. Even though he would have most likely been appointed as a teacher of this style, he left the Shintō-ryū aiming to create a new sword based combat system. In fact, during those years the Japanese swordsmanship gradually evolved from the rigid katageiko (form practice performed with either bokutō or with dull-edged swords called habiki) towards a free practice called shinaigeiko (also known as gekiken). This kind of training allowed two practitioners to spar without the risk of severe injury thanks to bamboo swords (shinai) and armor protecting the head (men), the arm (kote), and the torso (dō). With some exceptions, the popular gekiken of the second half of Edo period was quite similar to modern Kendō.

Kuranosuke organized all his martial arts knowledge into a new system of teaching and transmission; for this reason, even if codified during the Edo period, Tennen Rishin Ryū could be listed among new schools called shin ryūha. This was a breaking point between koryū (old schools) and gendai budō (martial arts developed after the Meiji Restoration). He created his own school by synthesizing an actual sword fight every occasion, sticking to a fencing style whose last goal was to obtain full victory without losing composure in front of an enemy. At the end of his musha shugyō Kuranosuke went to Edo. While he was establishing a dōjō in Yagenbori he most likely went to teach in the Sagami area (today's Kanagawa Prefecture) and Tama area (western part of Tōkyō). Since Tama was the birthplace of 2nd generation (Kondō Sansuke), 3rd generation (Kondō Shūsuke) and 4th generation (Kondō Isami) headmasters, there is little doubt that this actually happened. Kuranosuke died in the 4th year of Bunka era (1807).

The Shinsengumi ceased to exist after the 2nd year of Meiji (1869), with the end of the Boshin War and the collapse of Bakufu. It is commonly believed that the Boshin War marked the end of Tennen Rishin Ryū since Kondō Isami was sentenced to death and beheaded in Itabashi, Okita Sōji died of tuberculosis, and both Inoue Genzaburō and Hijikata Toshizō died in battle (the first one at Toba-fushimi and the latter in the battle of Goryōkaku). However, this is not historically correct. It was probably a great loss for the Shieikan dōjō, but the tradition survived. There were many teachers of the school at that time, most of them in the Tama area.

== During Meiji, Taishō and Shōwa periods ==
Before leaving for Kyōto 1863, Kondō Isami adopted his older brother Miyagawa Otogorō's second son, Miyagawa Yūgorō (born in 1851). The boy was supposed to marry Tama, Kondō's daughter (born in 1862) from a wedding with Matsui Tsune once the girl reached the age to be wed. Even though he did not probably receive any teaching from Kondō, Yūgorō was already practicing Tennen Rishin Ryū with his real father. Miyagawa Otogorō was a pupil of Tennen Rishin Ryū as well, since he joined the school together with his younger brother Katsugorō (the latter Kondō Isami). After the death of Kondō in 1868, Yūgorō continued his training under several teachers. He probably studied with Harada Kamezō (son of Harada Chūji, a disciple of Kondō Shūsuke), despite another theory claiming that he was to become a pupil of Matsuzaki Watagorō (eldest son of Matsuzaki Shōsaku, student of the nidaime Sansuke). Yūgorō eventually opened his own dōjō in 1876 in Kami-ishihara (Chōfu city), calling it Hatsuunkan. It is said that Yamaoka Tesshū (1836-1888), the founder of Ittō Shōden Mutō Ryū and one of strongest swordsman of Bakumatsu and early Meiji periods, gave this name (translated as "the hall where the dark clouds are removed") upon his arrival. In 1883, Yūgorō's first son Hisatarō was born. However, his mother, Tama, died three years later in 1886. The bloodline of Kondō Isamu ceased to exist when Hisatarō died in the Russo-Japanese war of 1905 at the age of twenty-two.

Yūgorō was remarried with a woman from Kokubunji city, called Tayo. From this union Kondō Shinkichi was born. Kondō Yūgorō eventually divorced from his new wife because she had a bad relationship with Matsui Tsune, the wife of Kondō Isamu and mother of Yūgorō’s wife Tama. The third and the last marriage the godaime contracted was with a girl named Kashi.

Kondō Yūgorō died in 1933, aged 83. Under his direction, the Hatsuunkan greatly flourished, gathering thousands of practitioners in the Tama area. At the beginning of Shōwa period he was interviewed by Shimozawa Kan (1892–1968), a writer whose Shinsengumi related books would go to inspire an entire literature genre in regards to the swordsmen corps. In fact, a large portion of Tennen Rishin Ryū's fame was due to jidai shōsetsu (historical novels).

The best disciple of Kondō Yūgorō, Sakurai Kinpachi, inherited the title of 6th generation headmaster when his teacher was still alive. However, in 1932, he was forced to leave the school since he moved to Hokkaidō. The school's fate was then passed to Yūgorō's son, Shinkichi, who became the 7th generation headmaster (nanadaime). Shinkichi also served as a Kendō assistant teacher (joshu) for the Keishichō, the police department.

Kondō Shinkichi died in his early forties during 1936. Afterwards, the Kondō line was left without guidance for several years until a new pupil, named Katō Isuke (student of Yūgorō and Shinkichi), returned from the war to claim the position of headmaster.
