= Kashima Shintō-ryū =

School of Japanese martial arts

Kashima Shintō-ryū (鹿島新當流)
- Ko-ryū

Foundation
- Founder: Tsukahara Bokuden (塚原 卜伝)
- Date founded: c.1530
- Period founded: Late Muromachi period

Current information
- Current headmaster: Yoshikawa Tsuenetaka

Arts taught
- Art: Description
- Kenjutsu - ōdachi, kodachi: Sword art - long and short sword
- Bōjutsu: Staff art
- Sōjutsu: Spear art
- Naginatajutsu: Glaive art

Ancestor schools
- Tenshin Shōden Katori Shintō-ryū

Descendant schools
- Yamaguchi-ryū; Tennen Rishin-ryū

Kashima Shintō-ryū (鹿島新當流) is a traditional (koryū) school of Japanese martial arts founded by Tsukahara Bokuden in the Muromachi period (c.1530).

== History ==
Due to its formation during the tumultuous Sengoku Jidai, a time of feudal war, the school's techniques are based on battlefield experience and revolve around finding weak points in the opponent's armor. The sword (katana), spear (yari) and glaive (naginata) are some of the weapons used by the school. The current headmaster of the school is Yoshikawa Tsuenetaka.

Kashima Shintō-ryū formerly had a series of iaijutsu techniques in its curriculum, but these were lost over time.
