= Oku no Hosomichi =

Work by the Japanese poet Matsuo Bashō

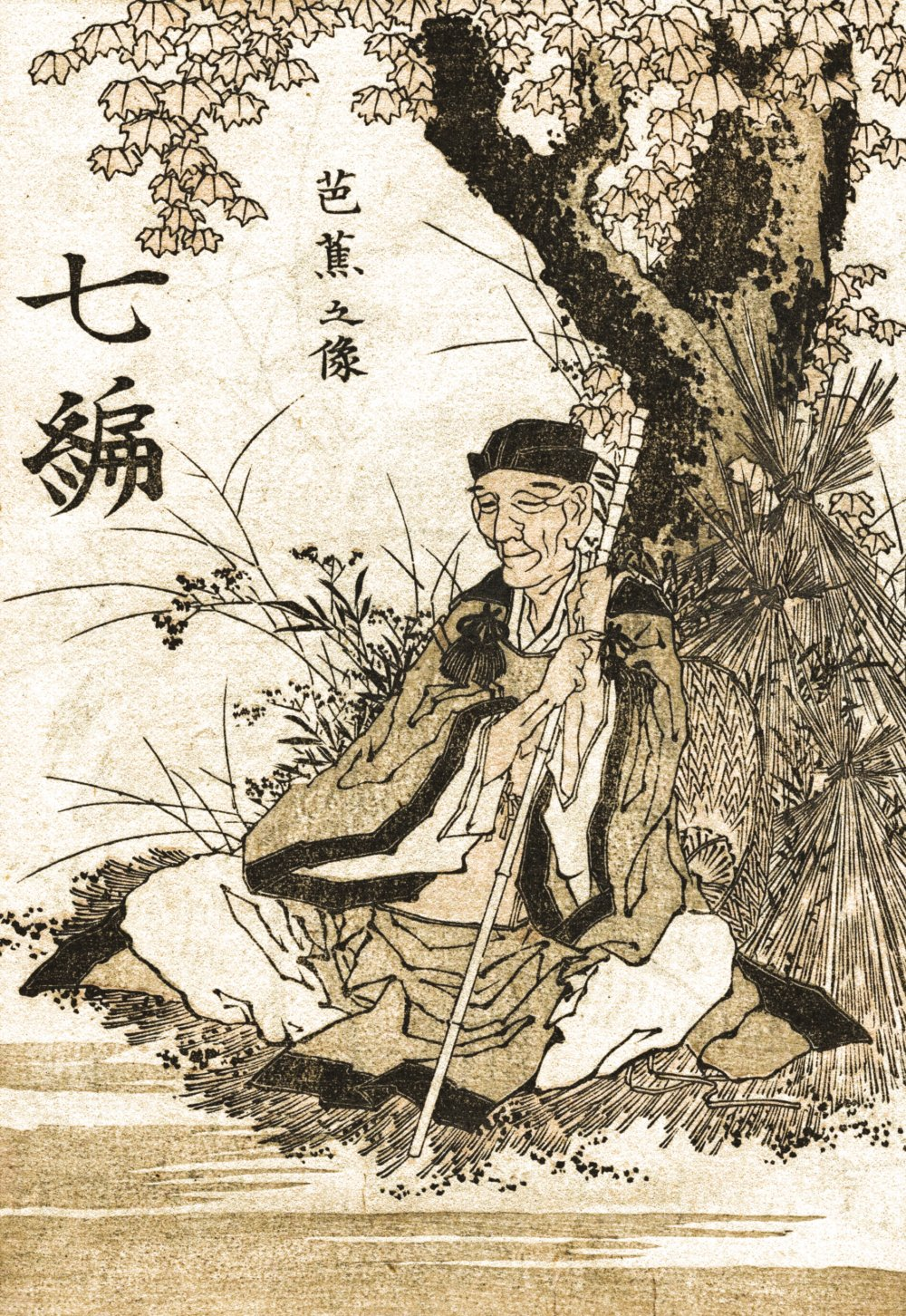
Bashō by Hokusai

Oku no Hosomichi (奥の細道 (Note: Originally おくのほそ道.); Japanese pronunciation: [oꜜ.kɯ no | ho.soꜜ.mʲi.tɕi]), translated as The Narrow Road to the Deep North and The Narrow Road to the Interior, is a major work of haibun by the Japanese poet Matsuo Bashō, considered one of the major texts of Japanese literature of the Edo period. The first edition was published posthumously in 1702.

== Background ==
The text is written in the form of a prose and verse travel diary and was penned as Bashō made an epic and dangerous journey on foot through the Edo Japan of the late 17th century.

While the poetic work became seminal of its own account, the poet's travels in the text have since inspired many people to follow in his footsteps and trace his journey for themselves. In one of its most memorable passages, Bashō suggests that "every day is a journey, and the journey itself home".

The text was also influenced by the works of Du Fu, who was highly revered by Bashō.

Of Oku no Hosomichi, Kenji Miyazawa once suggested, "It was as if the very soul of Japan had itself written it."

== The text ==
Post inscribed with a haiku by Matsuo Bashō from Oku no Hosomichi, on a street in Tsuruga

=== Opening sentences ===
Bashō's introductory sentences are the most quoted of Oku no Hosomichi:

Japanese original
English translation by Donald Keene

月日は百代の過客にして、行かふ年も又旅人也。舟の上に生涯をうかべ馬の口とらえて老をむかふる物は、日々旅にして、旅を栖とす。古人も多く旅に死せるあり。予もいづれの年よりか、片雲の風にさそはれて、漂泊の思ひやまず、海浜にさすらへ、去年の秋江上の破屋に蜘の古巣をはらひて、やゝ年も暮、春立る霞の空に、白河の関こえんと、そヾろ神の物につきて心をくるはせ、道祖神のまねきにあひて取もの手につかず、もゝ引の破をつヾり、笠の緒付かえて、三里に灸すゆるより、松島の月先心にかゝりて、住る方は人に譲り、杉風が別墅に移るに、

草の戸も住替る代ぞひなの家

面八句を庵の柱に懸置。

The months and days are the travellers of eternity. The years that come and go are also voyagers. Those who float away their lives on ships or who grow old leading horses are forever journeying, and their homes are wherever their travels take them. Many of the men of old died on the road, and I too for years past have been stirred by the sight of a solitary cloud drifting with the wind to ceaseless thoughts of roaming.

Last year I spent wandering along the seacoast. In autumn I returned to my cottage on the river and swept away the cobwebs. Gradually the year drew to its close. When spring came and there was mist in the air, I thought of crossing the Barrier of Shirakawa into Oku. I seemed to be possessed by the spirits of wanderlust, and they all but deprived me of my senses. The guardian spirits of the road beckoned, and I could not settle down to work.

I patched my torn trousers and changed the cord on my bamboo hat. To strengthen my legs for the journey I had moxa burned on my shins. By then I could think of nothing but the moon at Matsushima. When I sold my cottage and moved to Sampū's villa, to stay until I started on my journey, I hung this poem on a post in my hut:

kusa no to mo
sumikawaru yo zo
hina no ie

Translation:

Even a thatched hut
May change with a new owner
Into a doll’s house.

(This became the first of an eight-verse sequence.)

=== Plot ===
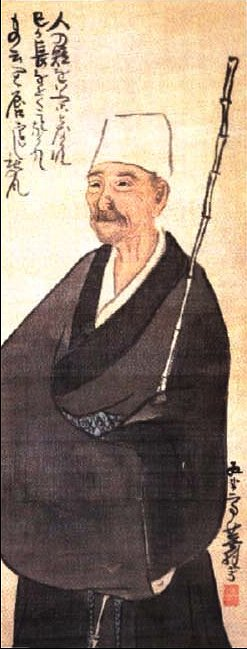
Bashō by Buson.

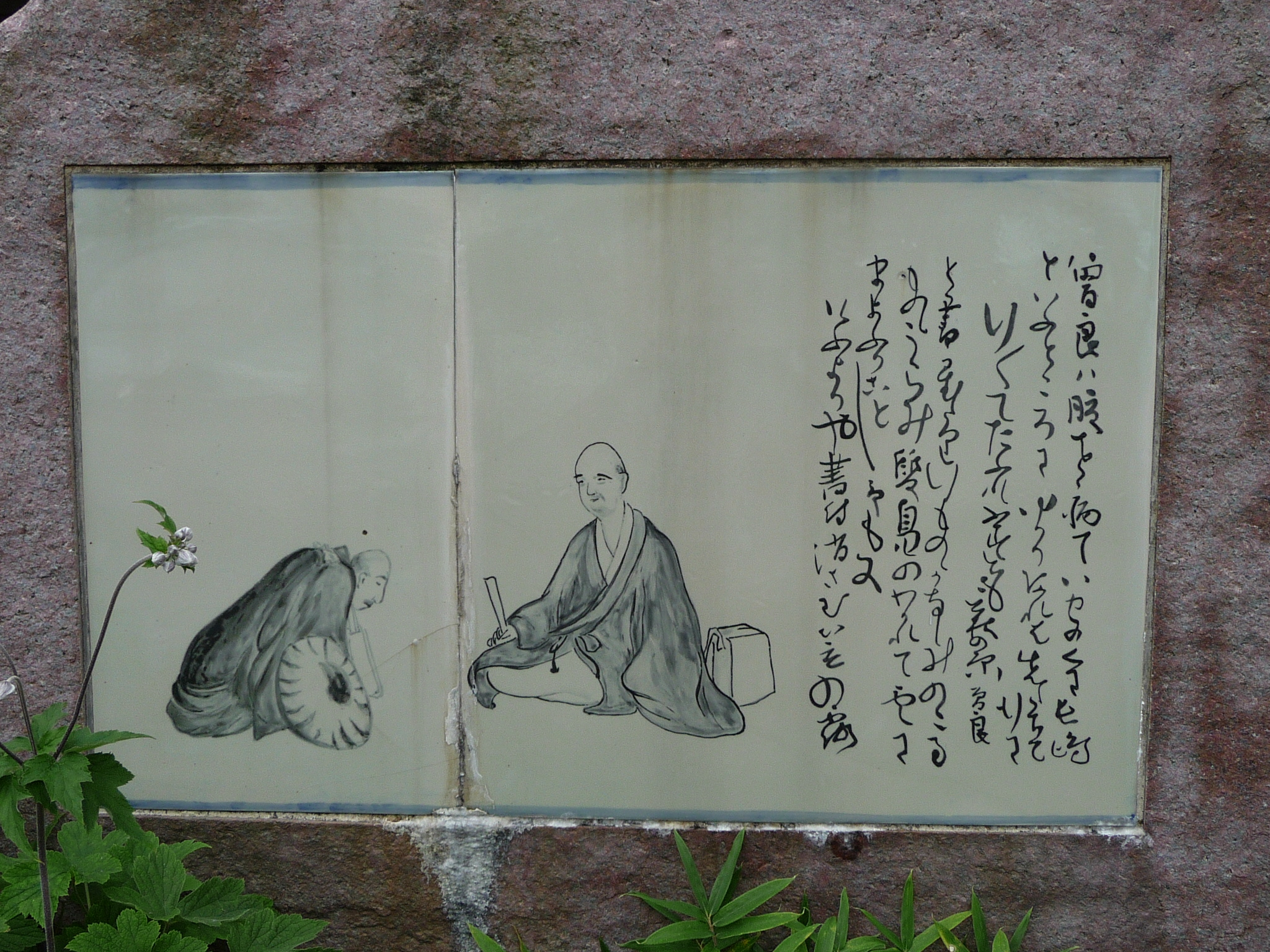
Bashō (right) and Sora (left) parted at Yamanaka Onsen

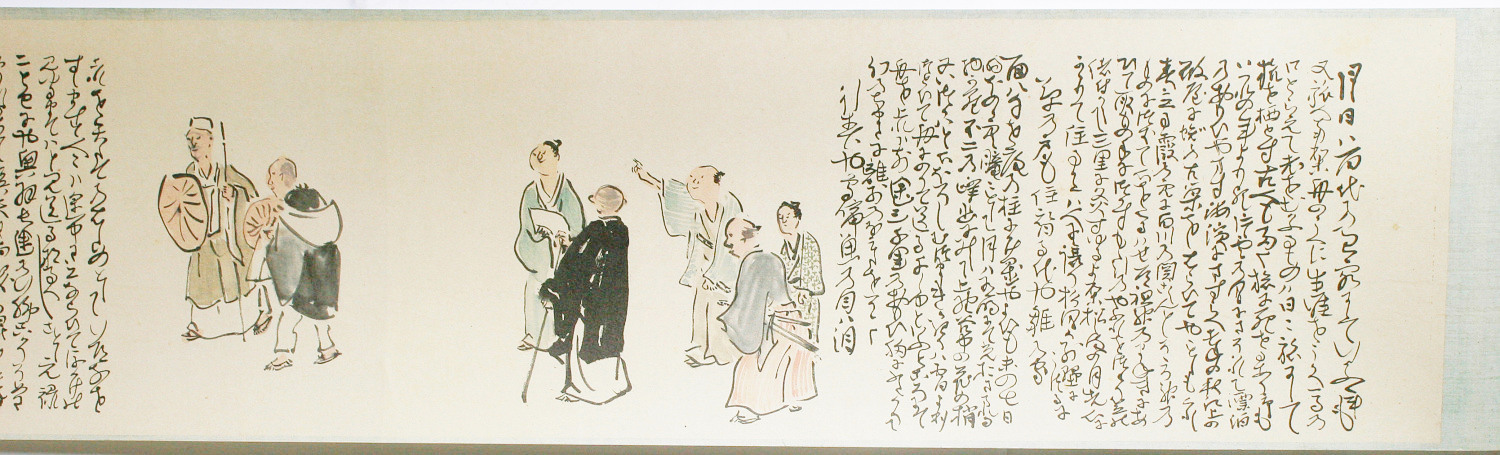
[Buson] Oku no Hosomichi Handscroll

Oku no Hosomichi was written based on a journey taken by Bashō in the late spring of 1689. He and his traveling companion Kawai Sora (河合曾良) departed from Edo (modern-day Tokyo) for the northerly interior region known as Oku, propelled mostly by a desire to see the places about which the old poets wrote in an effort to "renew his own art." Specifically, he was emulating Saigyō, whom Bashō praised as the greatest waka poet; Bashō made a point of visiting all the sites mentioned in Saigyō's verse. Travel in those days was very dangerous, but Bashō was committed to a kind of poetic ideal of wandering. He traveled for about 156 days altogether, covering almost 1,500 miles (2,400 km), mostly on foot. Of all of Bashō's works, this is the best known.

This poetic diary is in the form known as haibun, a combination of prose and haiku. It contains many references to Confucius, Saigyō, Du Fu, ancient Chinese poetry, and even The Tale of the Heike. It manages to strike a delicate balance between all the elements to produce a powerful account. It is primarily a travel account, and Bashō vividly relates the unique poetic essence of each stop in his travels. Stops on his journey include the Tokugawa shrine at Nikkō, the Shirakawa barrier, the islands of Matsushima, Hiraizumi, Sakata, Kisakata, and Etchū. He and Sora parted at Yamanaka, but at Ōgaki he briefly met up with a few of his other disciples before departing again to the Ise Shrine and closing the account.

After his journey, he spent five years working and reworking the poems and prose of Oku no Hosomichi before publishing it. Based on differences between draft versions of the account, Sora's diary, and the final version, it is clear that Bashō took a number of artistic liberties in the writing. An example of this is that in the Senjūshu ("Selection of Tales") attributed to Saigyō, the narrator is passing through Eguchi when he is driven by a storm to seek shelter in the nearby cottage of a prostitute; this leads to an exchange of poems, after which he spends the night there. Bashō similarly includes in Oku no Hosomichi a tale of him having an exchange with prostitutes staying in the same inn, but Sora mentions nothing.

== Philosophy behind the text ==
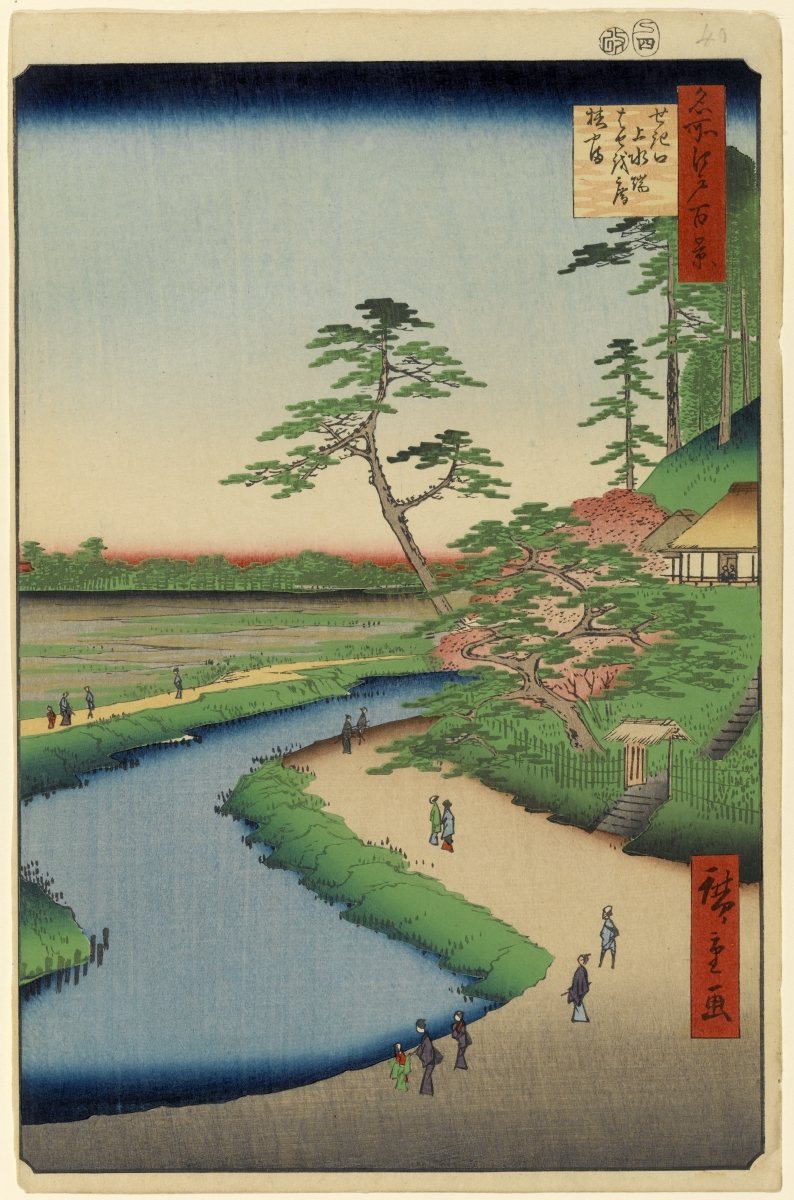
Bashō's hut on Camellia Hill. No. 40 of the One Hundred Famous Views of Edo by Hiroshige (1856–58)

Nobuyuki Yuasa notes that Bashō studied Zen meditation under the guidance of the Priest Buccho, though it is uncertain whether Bashō ever attained enlightenment. The Japanese Zen scholar D. T. Suzuki has described Bashō's philosophy in writing poetry as one requiring that both "subject and object were entirely annihilated"

in meditative experience. Yuasa likewise writes:

"Bashō had been casting away his earthly attachments, one by one, in the years preceding the journey, and now he had nothing else to cast away but his own self which was in him as well as around him. He had to cast this self away, for otherwise he was not able to restore his true identity (what he calls the 'everlasting self which is poetry')."

Yuasa notes

"The Narrow Road to the Deep North is Bashō's study in eternity, and in so far as he has succeeded in this attempt, it is also a monument he has set up against the flow of time."

References in Contemporary Literature

The Narrow Road to the Deep North is the title of a 2013 novel by Australian author Richard Flanagan, describing the lives of Australian prisoners of war who build the Siam–Burma Railway during the Second World War. The novel won the 2014 Booker Prize and features two Japanese officiers discussing Basho's haibun.

== Bibliography ==
=== English translations ===
- Bashō, Matsuo. The Narrow Road to the Deep North and Other Travel Sketches. Intro. and trans. Nobuyuki Yuasa. London: Penguin Books (Penguin Classics), 1966. Print. ISBN 978-0-14-044185-7
- Bashō, Matsuo. "The Narrow Road Through the Provinces". Japanese Poetic Diaries. Ed. and trans. Earl Miner. Berkeley: University of California Press, 1969. Print.
- Bashō, Matsuo. "The Narrow Road to the Interior". Classical Japanese Prose: An Anthology. Ed. and trans. Helen Craig McCullough. Stanford: Stanford University Press, 1990. Print.
- Bashō, Matsuo. Narrow Road to the Interior. Trans. Sam Hamill. Boston: Shambhala (Shambhala Centaur Editions), 1991. Print. ISBN 978-0-87773-644-8 (Presentation)
  - Reedition: Bashō, Matsuo. Narrow Road to the Interior and other writings. Trans. Sam Hamill. 2nd ed. Boston: Shambhala (Shambhala Classics), 2000. Print. ISBN 978-1-57062-716-3 (Presentation)
- Bashō, Matsuo. Back Roads to Far Towns: Bashō's Oku-no-hosomichi. Trans. Cid Corman and Kamaike Susumu. 2nd ed. (1st ed. Grossman, 1968.) Hopewell: Ecco Press, 1996. Print. ISBN 978-0-88001-467-0
  - Reedition: Bashō, Matsuo. Back Roads to Far Towns: Bashō's Travel Journal. Trans. Cid Corman and Kamaike Susumu. Buffalo: White Pine Press, 2004. Print. ISBN 978-1-893996-31-1 (Preview on Google Books) (Review of the book at Modern Haiku)
- Bashō, Matsuo. Bashō's Narrow Road: Spring and Autumn Passages. Trans. Hiroaki Sato. Berkeley: Stone Bridge Press (The Rock Spring Collection of Japanese Literature), 1996a. Print. ISBN 978-1-880656-20-4
- Bashō, Matsuo. The Narrow Road to Oku. Trans. Donald Keene. Tokyo: Kodansha International, 1996b. Print. ISBN 978-4-7700-2028-4
  - An earlier and slightly different partial translation appeared in the same translator's 1955 Anthology of Japanese Literature.
- Bashō, Matsuo. A Haiku Journey: Bashō's Narrow Road to a Far Province. Trans. Dorothy Britton. 3rd ed. (1st ed. 1974.) Tokyo: Kodansha International, 2002. Print. ISBN 978-4-7700-2858-7

=== Critical works ===
- Keene, Donald. Seeds in the Heart: Japanese Literature from Earliest Times to the Late Sixteenth Century. New York: Columbia University Press, 1999. Print. ISBN 0-231-11441-9
- Keene, Donald. Travelers of a Hundred Ages. New York: Columbia University Press, 1999a. Print. ISBN 978-0-231-11437-0
- Norman, Howard. "On the Trail of a Ghost". National Geographic. February 2008, 136–149. Print.
  - Online version: Norman, Howard. "On the Poet's Trail". National Geographic. February 2008. Web. Consulted on 13 November 2010.
- Shirane, Haruo. Traces of Dreams: Landscape, Cultural Memory, and the Poetry of Bashō. Stanford: Stanford University Press, 1998. Print. ISBN 0-8047-3099-7 (Preview on Google Books)
