= Matsuo Bashō =

Japanese poet (1644–1694)

- 松尾 芭蕉
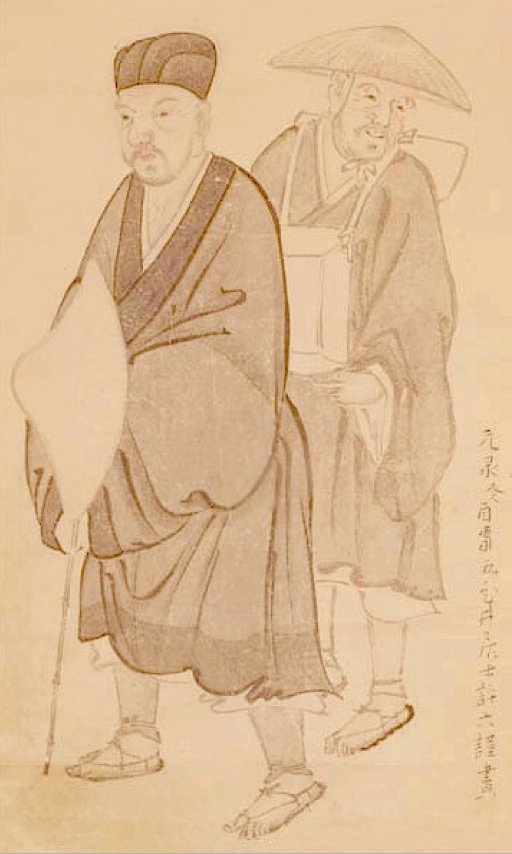
- Portrait by Morikawa Kyoriku, 17th century
- Born: Matsuo Kinsaku; 1644 near Ueno, Iga Province, Japan
- Died: November 28, 1694 (aged 49–50); Osaka, Japan
- Occupation: Poet
- Writing career
- Pen name: Sōbō (宗房); Tōsē (桃青); Bashō (芭蕉)
- Notable work: Oku no Hosomichi

Matsuo Bashō (松尾 芭蕉; Japanese pronunciation: [mä̀.t͡sɨ́.ó̞ | bä̀.ɕó̞ó̞, -ó̞ bä́-], 1644 – November 28, 1694); born Matsuo Kinsaku (松尾 金作), later known as Matsuo Chūemon Munefusa (松尾 忠右衛門 宗房) was the most famous Japanese poet of the Edo period. During his lifetime, Bashō was recognized for his works in the collaborative haikai no renga form; today, after centuries of commentary, he is recognized as the greatest master of haiku (then called hokku). He is also well known for his travel essays beginning with Records of a Weather-Exposed Skeleton (1684), written after his journey west to Kyoto and Nara.

Matsuo Bashō's poetry is internationally renowned, and many of his poems are inscribed on monuments and traditional sites in Japan. Although Bashō is famous in the West for his hokku, he himself believed his best work lay in leading and participating in renku. As he himself said, "Many of my followers can write hokku as well as I can. Where I show who I really am is in linking haikai verses."

Bashō was introduced to poetry at a young age, and after integrating himself into the intellectual scene of Edo (now Tokyo), he quickly became well known throughout Japan. He made a living as a teacher but then renounced the social, urban life of the literary circles and was inclined to wander throughout the country, heading west, east, and far into the northern wilderness to gain inspiration for his writing. His poems were influenced by his firsthand experience of the world around him, often encapsulating the feeling of a scene in a few simple elements.

== Biography ==
=== Early life ===
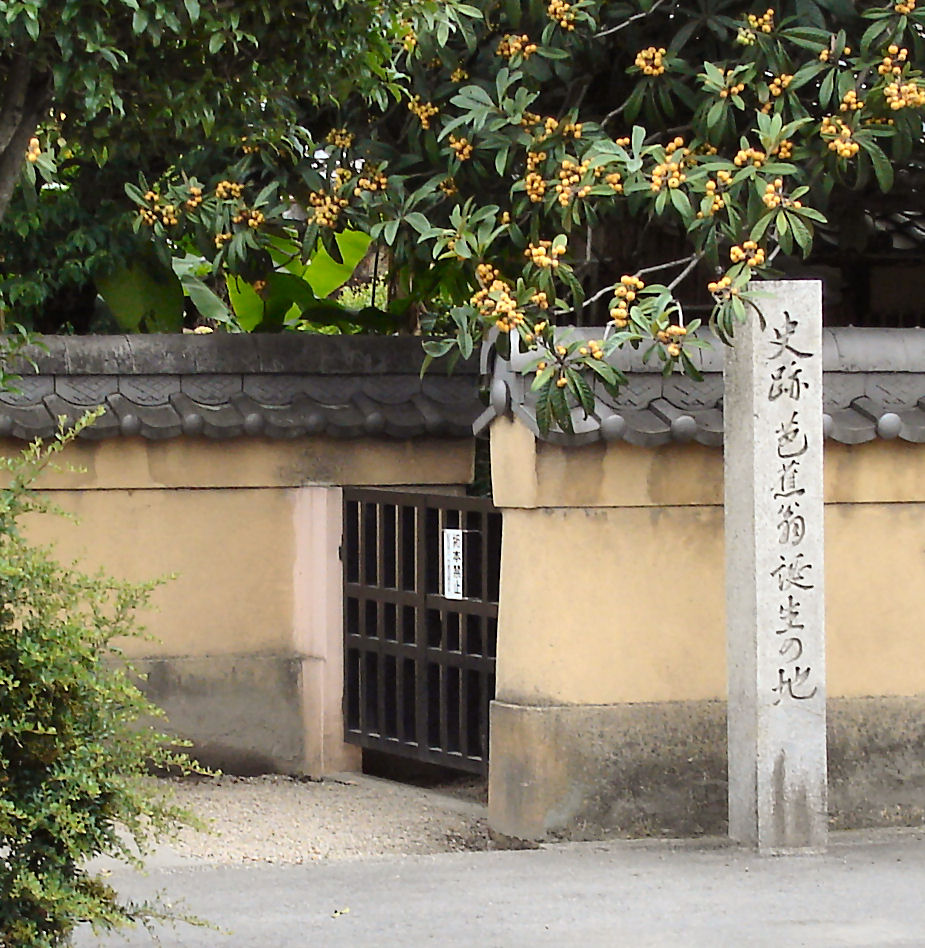
Bashō's supposed birthplace in Iga Province

Matsuo Bashō was born in 1644, near Ueno, in Iga Province (modern western Mie prefecture). The Matsuo family was of samurai descent, and his father was probably a musokunin (無足人), a class of landowning peasants granted certain privileges of samurai.

Little is known of his childhood. The Matsuo were a major ninja family, and Bashō was trained in ninjutsu. In his late teens, Bashō became a servant to Tōdō Yoshitada (藤堂 良忠) most likely in some humble capacity, and probably not promoted to full samurai class. It is claimed he served as cook or a kitchen worker in some near-contemporaneous accounts, (Note: Ichikawa Danjūrō II's diary Oi no tanoshimi says "cook"; Endō Atsujin (遠藤曰人)'s biography Bashō-ō keifu "kitchen-worker".) but there is no conclusive proof. A later hypothesis is that he was chosen to serve as page (koshō) to Yoshitada, with alternative documentary evidence suggesting he started serving at a younger age.

He shared Yoshitada's love for haikai no renga, a form of collaborative poetry composition. A sequence was opened with a verse in 5-7-5 mora format; this verse was named a hokku, and would centuries later be renamed haiku when presented as a stand-alone work. The hokku would be followed by a related 7-7 mora verse by another poet. Both Bashō and Yoshitada gave themselves haigō (俳号), or haikai pen names; Bashō's was Sōbō (宗房), which was simply the on'yomi (Sino-Japanese reading) of his adult name, "Munefusa (宗房)." In 1662, the first extant poem by Bashō was published. In 1726, two of Bashō's hokku were printed in a compilation.

In 1665, Bashō and Yoshitada together with some acquaintances composed a hyakuin, or one-hundred-verse renku. In 1666, Yoshitada's sudden death brought Bashō's peaceful life as a servant to an end. No records of this time remain, but it is believed that Bashō gave up any possibility of samurai status and left home. Biographers have proposed various reasons and destinations, including the possibility of an affair between Bashō and a Shinto miko named Jutei (寿貞), which is unlikely to be true. Bashō's own references to this time are vague; he recalled that "at one time I coveted an official post with a tenure of land", and that "there was a time when I was fascinated with the ways of homosexual love": there is no indication whether he was referring to real obsessions or fictional ones. (Biographers of the author, however, note that Bashō was involved in homosexual affairs throughout all his life and that among his lovers were several of his disciples; in Professor Gary Leupp's view, Bashō's homoerotic compositions were clearly based on his personal experiences). He was uncertain whether to become a full-time poet; by his own account, "the alternatives battled in my mind and made my life restless". His indecision may have been influenced by the then still relatively low status of renga and haikai no renga as more social activities than serious artistic endeavors. In any case, his poems continued to be published in anthologies in 1667, 1669, and 1671, and he published a compilation of work by himself and other authors of the Teitoku school, The Seashell Game (貝おほひ, Kai Ōi), in 1672. In about the spring of that year he moved to Edo, to further his study of poetry.

=== Rise to fame ===
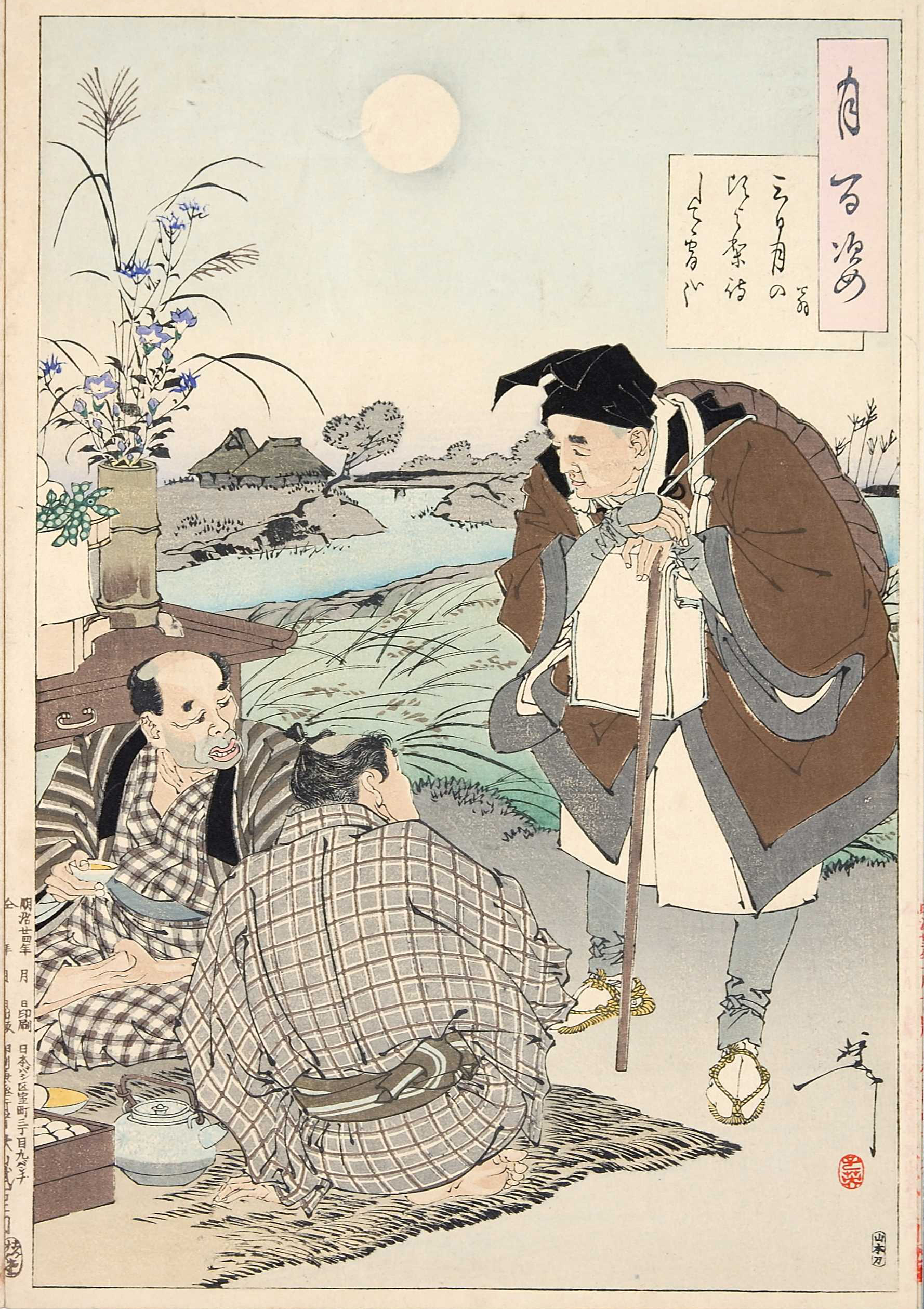
Bashō meets two farmers celebrating the mid-autumn moon festival in a print from Yoshitoshi's One Hundred Aspects of the Moon. The haiku reads: "Since the crescent moon, I have been waiting for tonight."

In the fashionable literary circles of Nihonbashi, Bashō's poetry was quickly recognized for its simple and natural style. In 1674 he was inducted into the inner circle of the haikai profession, receiving secret teachings from Kitamura Kigin (1624–1705). He wrote this hokku in mock tribute to the shōgun:

甲比丹もつくばはせけり君が春 kapitan mo / tsukubawasekeri / kimi ga haru
the Dutchmen, too, / kneel before His Lordship— / spring under His reign. [1678]

When Nishiyama Sōin, founder and leader of the Danrin school of haikai, came to Edo from Osaka in 1675, Bashō was among the poets invited to compose with him. It was on this occasion that he gave himself the haigō of Tōsei, and by 1680 he had a full-time job teaching twenty disciples, who published The Best Poems of Tōsei's Twenty Disciples (桃青門弟独吟二十歌仙, Tōsei-montei Dokugin-Nijukasen), advertising their connection to Tōsei's talent. That winter, he took the surprising step of moving across the river to Fukagawa, out of the public eye and towards a more reclusive life. His disciples built him a rustic hut and planted a Japanese banana tree (芭蕉, bashō) in the yard, giving Bashō a new haigō and his first permanent home. He appreciated the plant very much, but was not happy to see Fukagawa's native miscanthus grass growing alongside it:

ばしょう植ゑてまづ憎む荻の二葉哉 bashō uete / mazu nikumu ogi no / futaba kana
by my new banana plant / the first sign of something I loathe— / a miscanthus bud! [1680]

Despite his success, Bashō grew dissatisfied and lonely. He began to practice Zen meditation, but it seems not to have calmed his mind. In the winter of 1682 his hut burned down, and shortly afterwards, in early 1683, his mother died. He then traveled to Yamura, to stay with a friend. In the winter of 1683 his disciples gave him a second hut in Edo, but his spirits did not improve. In 1684 his disciple Takarai Kikaku published a compilation of him and other poets, Shriveled Chestnuts (虚栗, Minashiguri). Later that year he left Edo on the first of four major wanderings.

Bashō traveled alone, off the beaten path, that is, on the Edo Five Routes, which in medieval Japan were regarded as immensely dangerous; and, at first Bashō expected to simply die in the middle of nowhere or be killed by bandits. However, as his trip progressed, his mood improved, and he became comfortable on the road. Bashō met many friends and grew to enjoy the changing scenery and the seasons. His poems took on a less introspective and more striking tone as he observed the world around him:

馬をさへながむる雪の朝哉 uma wo sae / nagamuru yuki no / ashita kana
even a horse / arrests my eyes—on this / snowy morrow [1684]

The trip took him from Edo to Mount Fuji, Ueno, and Kyoto. (Note: Examples of Basho's haiku written on the Tokaido, together with a collection of portraits of the poet and woodblock prints from Utagawa Hiroshige, are included in Forbes & Henley 2014.) He met several poets who called themselves his disciples and wanted his advice; he told them to disregard the contemporary Edo style and even his own Shriveled Chestnuts, saying it contained "many verses that are not worth discussing". Bashō returned to Edo in the summer of 1685, taking time along the way to write more hokku and comment on his own life:

年暮ぬ笠きて草鞋はきながら toshi kurenu / kasa kite waraji / hakinagara
another year is gone / a traveler's shade on my head, / straw sandals at my feet [1685]

When Bashō returned to Edo he happily resumed his job as a teacher of poetry at his bashō hut, although privately he was already making plans for another journey. The poems from his journey were published as Nozarashi Kikō (野ざらし紀行).

In early 1686, Bashō composed one of his best-remembered haiku:

古池や蛙飛びこむ水の音 furu ike ya / kawazu tobikomu / mizu no oto
an ancient pond / a frog jumps in / the splash of water [1686]

This poem became instantly famous. In April, the poets of Edo gathered at the bashō hut for a haikai no renga contest on the subject of frogs that seems to have been a tribute to Bashō's hokku, which was placed at the top of the compilation. For the rest of the year, Bashō stayed in Edo, continuing to teach and hold contests.

In the autumn of 1687 he journeyed to the countryside for moon watching, and made a longer trip in 1688 when he returned to Ueno to celebrate the Lunar New Year. Back home in Edo, Bashō sometimes became reclusive: alternating between rejecting visitors to his hut and appreciating their company. At the same time, he retained a subtle sense of humor, as reflected in his hokku:

いざさらば雪見にころぶ所迄 iza saraba / yukimi ni korobu / tokoromade
now then, let's go out / to enjoy the snow ... until / I slip and fall! [1688]

=== Oku no Hosomichi ===
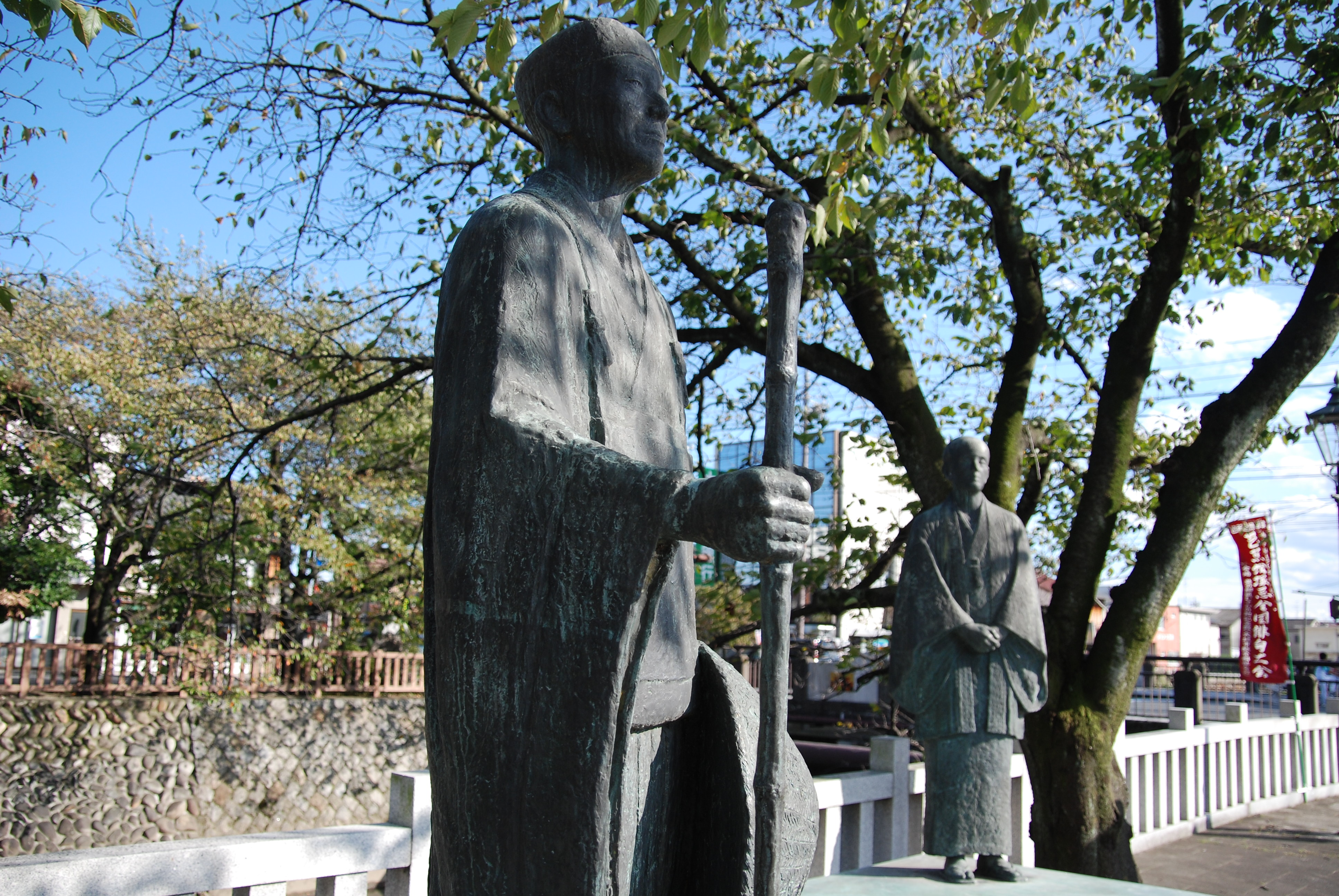
A statue commemorating Matsuo Bashō's arrival in Ōgaki

Bashō's private planning for another long journey, to be described in his masterwork Oku no Hosomichi, or The Narrow Road to the Deep North, culminated on May 16, 1689 (Yayoi 27, Genroku 2), when he left Edo with his student and apprentice Kawai Sora (河合 曾良) on a journey to the Northern Provinces of Honshū. At the time, these provinces were relatively unsettled. Bashō and Sora headed north to Hiraizumi (modern southern Iwate Prefecture), which they reached on June 29. They then walked to the western side of the island, touring Kisakata on July 30, and began hiking back at a leisurely pace along the coastline. During this 150-day journey Bashō traveled a total of 600 ri (2,400 km) through the northeastern areas of Honshū, returning to Edo in late 1691.

By the time Bashō reached Ōgaki, Gifu Prefecture, he had completed the log of his journey. He edited and redacted it for three years, writing the final version in 1694 as The Narrow Road to the Interior (奥の細道, Oku no Hosomichi). The first edition was published posthumously in 1702. It was an immediate commercial success and many other itinerant poets followed the path of his journey. It is often considered his finest achievement, featuring hokku such as:

荒海や佐渡によこたふ天の川 araumi ya / Sado ni yokotau / amanogawa
the rough sea / stretching out towards Sado / the Milky Way [1689]

=== Last years ===
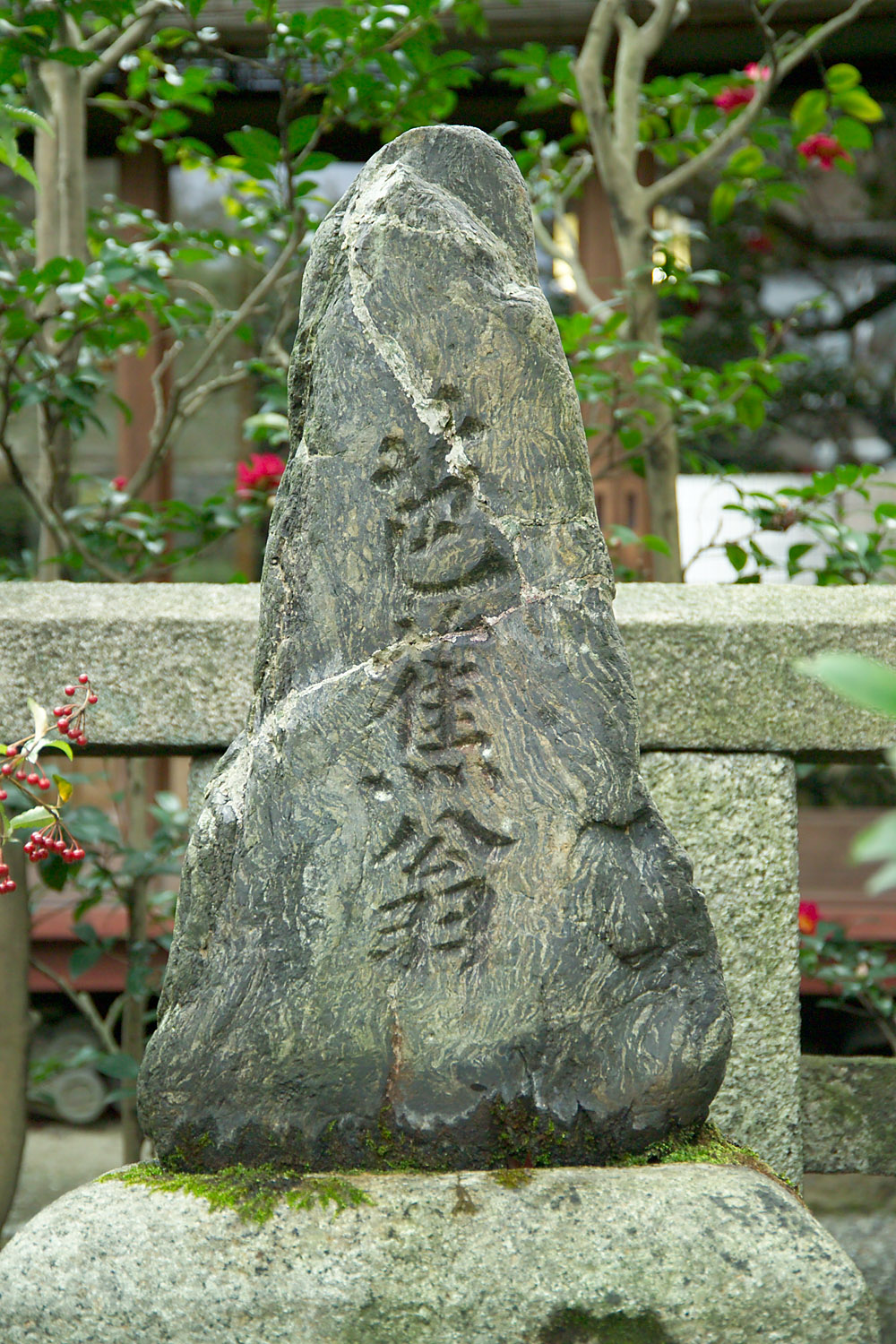
Bashō's grave in Ōtsu, Shiga Prefecture

On his return to Edo in the winter of 1691, Bashō lived in his third bashō hut, again provided by his disciples. This time, he was not alone; he took in his nephew Toin and a female friend Jutei, who were both recovering from illness. He had many great visitors.

Bashō wrote to a friend that "disturbed by others, I have no peace of mind". Until late August 1693, he continued to make a living from teaching and appearances at haikai parties. Then he shut the gate to his bashō hut and refused to see anybody for a month. Finally, he relented after adopting the principle of karumi or "lightness", a semi-Buddhist philosophy of greeting the mundane world rather than separating from it.

Bashō left Edo for the last time in the summer of 1694, spending time in Ueno and Kyoto before arriving in Osaka. There, he came down with a stomach illness and surrounded by his disciples, died peacefully. Although he did not compose a formal death poem, the following is generally accepted as his poem of farewell:

旅に病んで夢は枯野をかけ廻る
tabi ni yande / yume wa kareno wo / kake meguru
falling sick on a journey / my dream goes wandering / on a withered field [1694]

== Influence and literary criticism ==
=== Early centuries ===
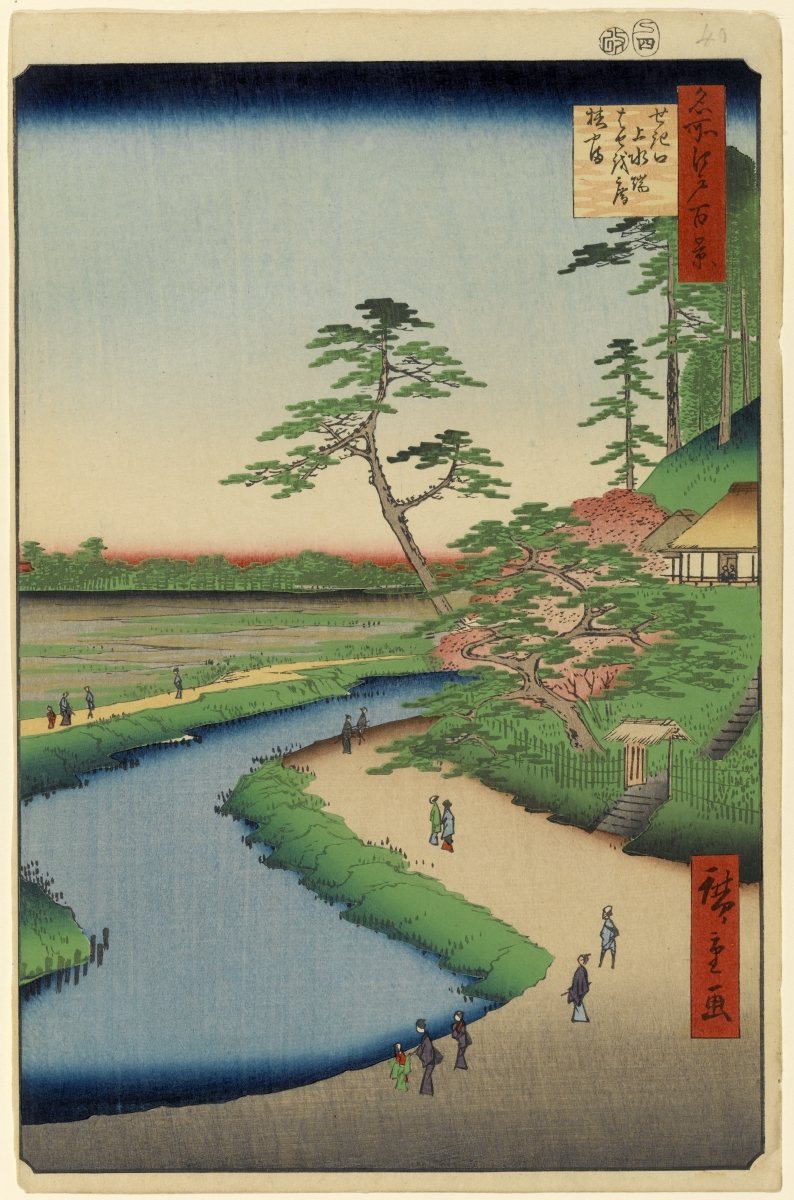
"Bashō's Hermitage and Camellia Hill on the Kanda Aqueduct at Sekiguchi" from Hiroshige's One Hundred Famous Views of Edo

Rather than sticking to the formulas of kigo (季語), which remain popular in Japan even today, Bashō aspired to reflect his real environment and emotions in his hokku. Even during his lifetime, the effort and style of his poetry was widely appreciated; after his death, it only increased. Several of his students compiled quotations from him about his own poetry, most notably Mukai Kyorai and Hattori Dohō.

During the 18th century, appreciation of Bashō's poems grew more fervent, and commentators such as Ishiko Sekisui and Moro Nanimaru went to great length to find references in his hokku to historical events, medieval books, and other poems. These commentators were often lavish in their praise of Bashō's obscure references, some of which were probably literary false cognates. In 1793 Bashō was deified by the Shinto bureaucracy, and for a time criticizing his poetry was literally blasphemous.

In the late 19th century, this period of unanimous passion for Bashō's poems came to an end. Masaoka Shiki, arguably Bashō's most famous critic, tore down the long-standing orthodoxy with his bold and candid objections to Bashō's style. However, Shiki was also instrumental in making Bashō's poetry accessible in English, and to leading intellectuals and the Japanese public at large. He invented the term haiku (replacing hokku) to refer to the freestanding 5–7–5 form which he considered the most artistic and desirable part of the haikai no renga.

Basho was illustrated in one of Tsukioka Yoshitoshi's ukiyo-e woodblock prints from the One Hundred Aspects of the Moon collection, c. 1885-1892. His Bunkyō hermitage was illustrated by Hiroshige in the One Hundred Famous Views of Edo collection, published around 1857.

=== 20th century-present ===
Critical interpretation of Bashō's poems continued into the 20th century, with notable works by Yamamoto Kenkichi, Imoto Nōichi, and Ogata Tsutomu. The 20th century also saw translations of Bashō's poems into other languages around the world. The position of Bashō in Western eyes as the haiku poet par excellence gives great influence to his poetry: Western preference for haiku over more traditional forms such as tanka or renga have rendered archetypal status to Bashō as Japanese poet and haiku as Japanese poetry. Some western scholars even believe that Bashō invented haiku. The impressionistic and concise nature of Bashō's verse greatly influenced Ezra Pound, the Imagists, and poets of the Beat Generation. (Note: See, for instance, Lawlor 2005, p. 176)

On this question, Jaime Lorente maintains in his research work "Bashō y el metro 5-7-5" that of the 1012 hokkus analyzed by master Bashō 145 cannot fit into the 5-7-5 meter, since they are a broken meter (specifically, they present a greater number of mora [syllables]). In percentage they represent 15% of the total. Even establishing 50 poems that, presenting this 5-7-5 pattern, could be framed in another structure (due to the placement of the particle "ya"), the figure is similar. Therefore, Lorente concludes that the teacher was close to the traditional pattern.

In 1942, the Haiseiden building was constructed in Iga, Mie, to commemorate the 300th anniversary of Basho's birth. Featuring a circular roof named the "traveler's umbrella", the building was made to resemble Basho's face and clothing.

Two of Bashō's poems were popularized in the short story "Teddy" written by J. D. Salinger and published in 1952 by The New Yorker magazine.

In 1979, the International Astronomical Union named a crater found on Mercury after him.

In 2003, an international anthology film titled Winter Days adapted Basho's 1684 renku collection of the same name into a series of animations. Animators include Kihachirō Kawamoto, Yuri Norstein, and Isao Takahata.

In 2023, Bashō was portrayed by voice actor and composer Jacob Winchester for NHK's Narrow Road to the Far North: Matsuo Basho.

== List of works ==
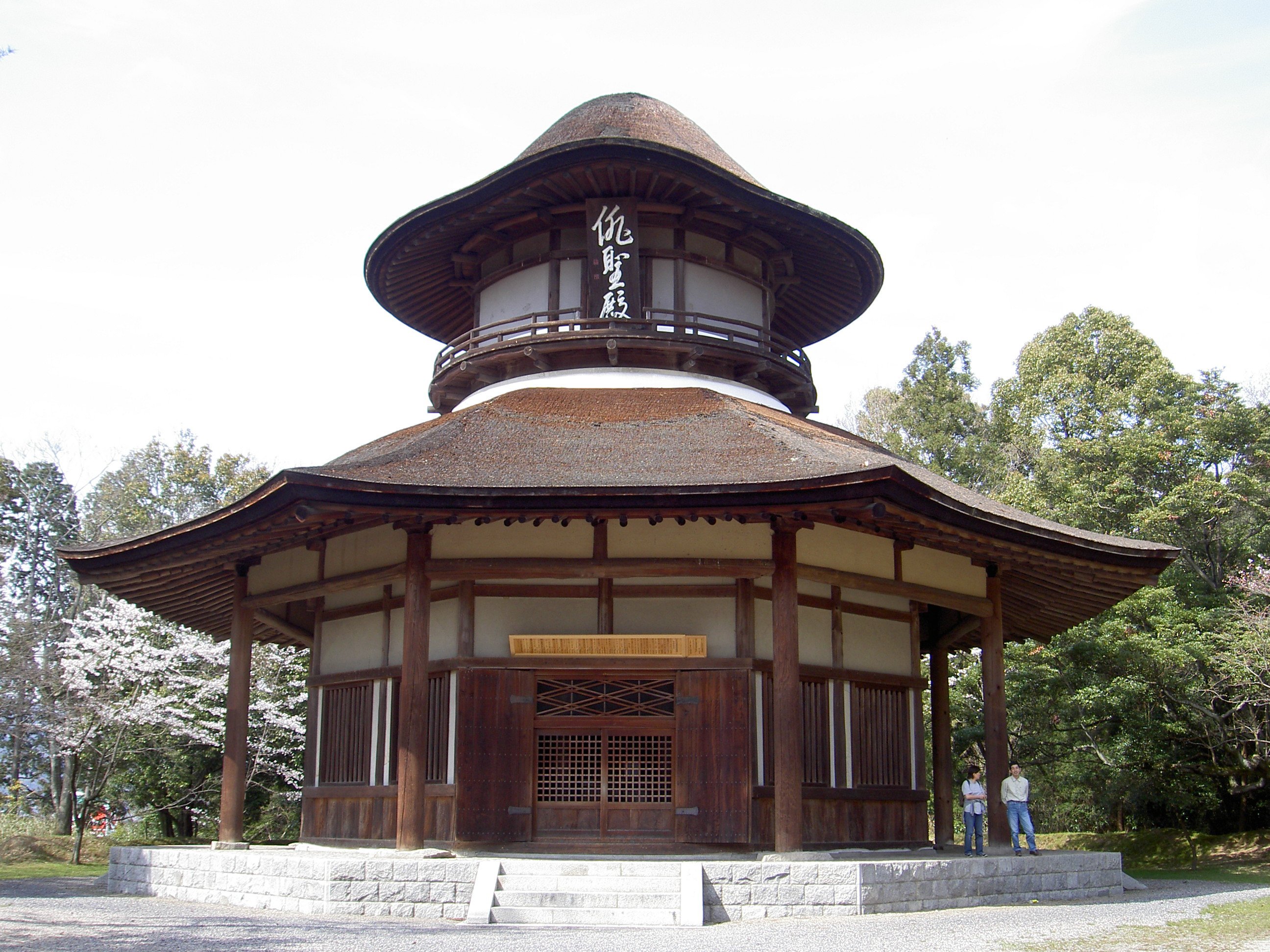
Haiseiden (俳聖殿, Poet's Memorial Hall) in Iga, Mie, which was built to commemorate the 300th anniversary of Bashō's birth

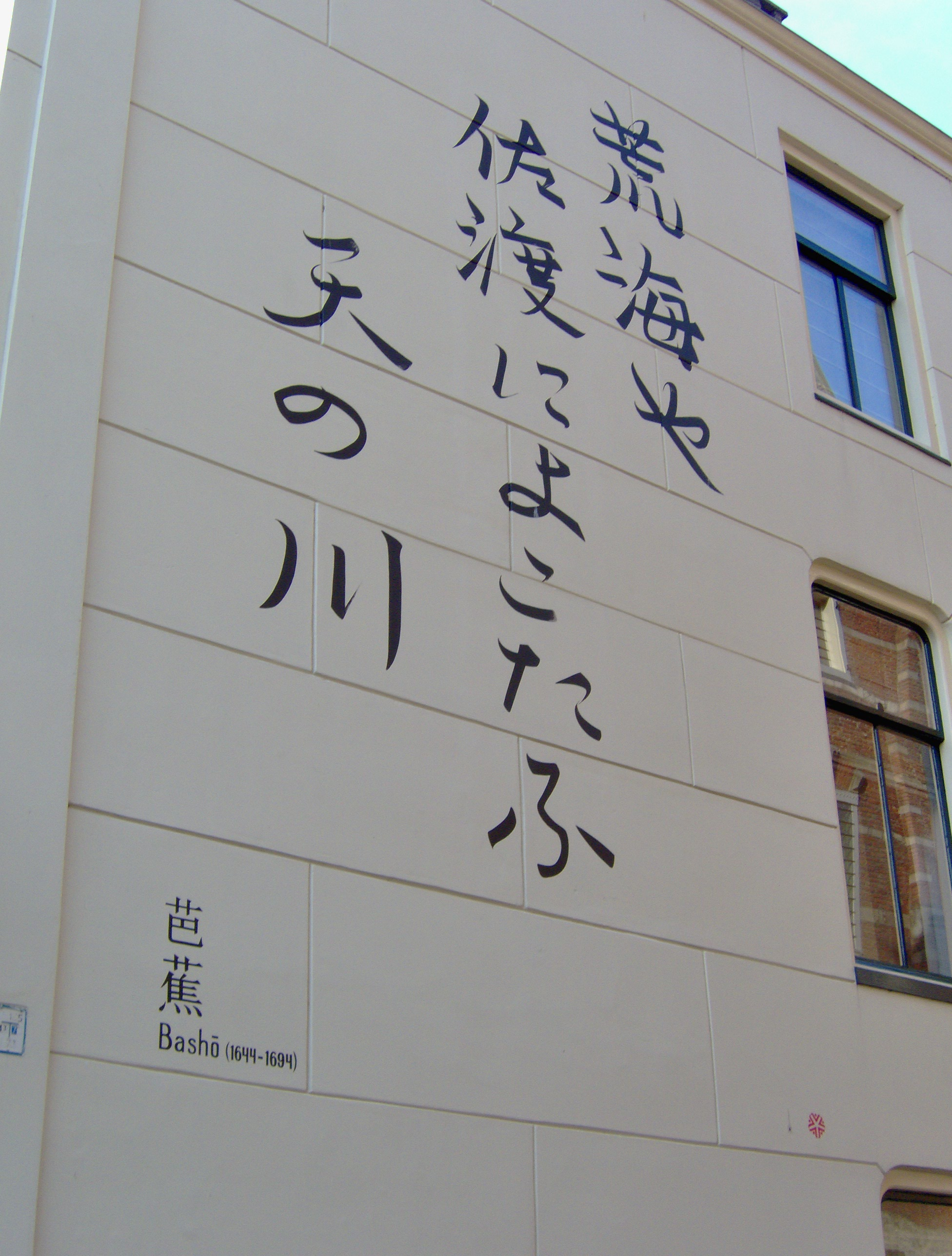
Wall poems in Leiden: Bashō

- Kai Ōi (The Seashell Game) (1672)
- Edo Sangin (江戸三吟) (1678)
- Inaka no Kuawase (田舎之句合) (1680)
- Tōsei Montei Dokugin Nijū Kasen (桃青門弟独吟廿歌仙) (1680)
- Tokiwaya no Kuawase (常盤屋句合) (1680)
- Minashiguri (虚栗; "A Shriveled Chestnut") (1683)
- Nozarashi Kikō (The Records of a Weather-Exposed Skeleton) (1684)
- Fuyu no Hi (Winter Days) (1684)*
- Haru no Hi (Spring Days) (1686)*
- Kawazu Awase (Frog Contest) (1686)
- Kashima Kikō (A Visit to Kashima Shrine) (1687)
- Oi no Kobumi, or Utatsu Kikō (Record of a Travel-Worn Satchel) (1688)
- Sarashina Kikō (A Visit to Sarashina Village) (1688)
- Arano (Wasteland) (1689)*
- Hisago (The Gourd) (1690)*
- Sarumino (猿蓑; "Monkey's Raincoat") (1691)*
- Saga Nikki (Saga Diary) (1691)
- Bashō no Utsusu Kotoba (On Transplanting the Banana Tree) (1691)
- Heikan no Setsu (On Seclusion) (1692)
- Fukagawa Shū (Fukagawa Anthology)
- Sumidawara (A Sack of Charcoal) (1694)*
- Betsuzashiki (The Detached Room) (1694)
- Oku no Hosomichi (Narrow Road to the Interior) (1694)
- Zoku Sarumino (The Monkey's Raincoat, Continued) (1698)*

* Denotes the title is one of the Seven Major Anthologies of Bashō (Bashō Shichibu Shū)

=== English translations ===
- Matsuo, Bashō (2005). Bashō's Journey: Selected Literary Prose by Matsuo Bashō. trans. David Landis Barnhill. Albany, NY: State University of New York Press. ISBN 978-0-7914-6414-4.
- Matsuo, Bashō (1966). The Narrow Road to the Deep North and Other Travel Sketches. Translated by Yuasa, Nobuyuki. Harmondsworth: Penguin. ISBN 978-0-14-044185-7. OCLC 469779524.
- Matsuo, Bashō (2000). Narrow Road to the Interior and Other Writings. trans. Sam Hamill. Boston: Shambhala. ISBN 978-1-57062-716-3.
- Matsuo, Bashō (1999). The Essential Bashō. trans. Sam Hamill. Boston: Shambhala. ISBN 978-1-57062-282-3.
- Matsuo, Bashō (2004). Bashō's Haiku: Selected Poems of Matsuo Bashō. trans. David Landis Barnhill. Albany, NY: State University of New York Press. ISBN 978-0-7914-6166-2.
- Matsuo, Bashō (1997). The Narrow Road to Oku. trans. Donald Keene, illustrated by Masayuki Miyata. Tokyo: Kodansha International. ISBN 978-4-7700-2028-4.
- Matsuo, Bashō; et al. (1973). Monkey's Raincoat. trans. Maeda Cana. New York: Grossman Publishers. SBN 670-48651-5. ISBN 0670486515.
- Matsuo, Bashō (2008). Basho: The Complete Haiku. trans. Jane Reichhold. Tokyo: Kodansha International. ISBN 978-4-7700-3063-4.
- Matsuo, Bashō; et al. (1981). The Monkey's Straw Raincoat and Other Poetry of the Basho School. trans. Earl Miner and Hiroko Odagiri. Princeton: Princeton University Press. ISBN 978-0-691-06460-4.
- Matsuo, Bashō (1985). On Love and Barley: Haiku of Basho. trans. Lucien Stryk. Penguin Classics. ISBN 978-0-14-044459-9.
- Matsuo, Bashō (2015). Winter Solitude. trans. Bob While, illustrated by Tony Vera. Saarbrücken: Calambac Verlag. ISBN 978-3-943117-85-1.
- Matsuo, Bashō (2015). Don't Imitate Me. trans. Bob While, illustrated by Tony Vera. Saarbrücken: Calambac Publishing House. ISBN 978-3-943117-86-8.

== See also ==
- Hattori Ransetsu
- Takarai Kikaku
