= Takuma Kajiwara =

Japanese-American photographer

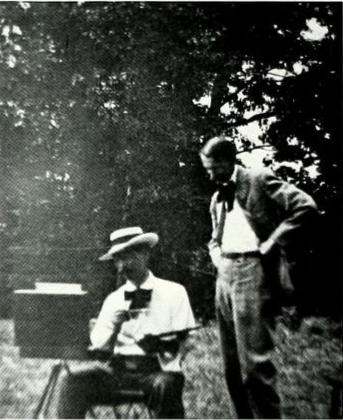
Takuma Kajiwara (seated) and Frederick Oakes Sylvester in Elsah, Illinois

Takuma Kajiwara (梶原 琢磨, Kajiwara Takuma; November 15, 1876 – March 11, 1960) was a Japanese-born American artist who was called "one of the seven greatest photographers in the United States".

== Biography ==
Kajiwara was born on November 15, 1876, in Fukuoka, Japan, to a samurai family of artists and art lovers. He was the third of five brothers. One of them, Kango, was a court painter.

Takuma came to St. Louis in the United States in 1905, "lured to the city partly by an offer of employment in a studio and even more by a desire to see the Mississippi River", according to his obituary in the St. Louis Star-Times. While in St. Louis he lived at the Warwick Hotel.

When he was in his late 20s, he played billiards and was described by a sports reporter then as being "small, slight and supple." He used a cue stick presented to him by Willie Hoppe, the billiards master.

He was a naturalized citizen of the United States.

Kajiwara was married on June 6, 1936, in Queens, New York, to Fern Horton Searls of Wisconsin, who had been employed as a social service worker at the Washington University in St. Louis clinic. They were wed in the home of Paul F. Berdanier, a former St. Louis artist. In 1938, the Kajiwaras went to Japan and stayed a year. In his obituaries, his wife was identified as Makota or Makoto Kajiwara. He was also survived by two brothers who lived in Japan. Fern Searls was born on July 30, 1893, and died in New York City at the age of 61 on July 13, 1955.

Kajiwara and artist Frederick Oakes Sylvester were friends. According to one account, their amity was "warm enough to cause them to cut wrists and mingle blood in a gesture of unity." Kajiwara did photographic work for The Great River, a book by Sylvester collecting his paintings of the Mississippi. Photos show the men painting together.

Later in life, for recreation, he enjoyed golf.

Kajiwara died of a cerebral hemorrhage in New York City on March 11, 1960.

== Career ==
=== St. Louis ===
Kajiwara worked in a photographers' studio in Seattle, Washington, then went back to Japan, where, at the request of the government, he spent several months organizing photography clubs. He then returned to the United States, moving to St. Louis at the behest of a company that made photographic plates and wanted him to take charge of its studio at the Louisiana Purchase Exposition of 1904. He opened his own studio shortly thereafter and moved it to the Century Building in 1914. He painted or wrote philosophical essays in his spare time.

Portrait photography should have dignity. It is not like selling neckties.

— Kajiwara, 1936.

In his paintings, he combined Eastern and American techniques. Kajiwara was especially talented for photographing women, being quoted at one time by fellow photographer Albert H. Strebler as often telling them "I will make you look like a glamor queen."

He was known as one of the two best portraitists of his day in St. Louis, the other being Julius Caesar Strauss.

=== New York City ===
Kajiwara left St. Louis in February 1936, telling reporters that the Great Depression had made earning a living through photography and painting too difficult for him. He also said that portrait photography in St. Louis had "become more commercialized, more a matter of high-pressure salesmanship." He said that portrait photography should have more dignity attached to it" and that such a "speculative business is not in my line." He said the Midwest was "barren soil for the artist" and that the centers of painting were in the East. He opened a studio in New York City, where he lived at 58 West 57th Street in Manhattan.

After his departure from St. Louis, his studio was to continue in his name, being run by Oswald Moeller, his assistant, and Myrtle Bone, his secretary.

=== Honors ===
- Kajiwara received the gold medal of honor in the 1951 and 1954 Allied Artists of America exhibition at the National Academy Galleries in New York City.
- The Photographers' Association of America identified him as one of the best photographers in America.
- His paintings were hung not only in St. Louis, but also in the Pennsylvania Academy, the Detroit Institute of Arts and other museums.
- His prizes included the St. Louis Artists Guild, 1922; Weinmar, 1924; Mallinckrodt, 1926; Kansas City Art Institute, 1926; Baldwin, 1928 and 1932; Werner, 1929; and Allied Artists of America, 1945, 1948 and 1951. The 1951 honor was for a painting of the Garden of Eden titled "It All Happened in Six Days."
- His work was in the permanent collections of Hunter College, Tuttle Memorial in St. Louis, Johns Hopkins University, Washington University in St. Louis, and St. Louis University.

== Notable people photographed by Takuma Kajiwara ==
- Zoe Akins, playwright and author
- Roger N. Baldwin, executive director of the American Civil Liberties Union
- Blanche Bates, actress
- Elise J. Blattner, lecturer
- Lulu Kunkel Burg, violinist
- Eveline Burgess, chess champion
- Lucille Erskine, writer, educator and publicist
- Emma Goldman, activist and writer
- Florence Hayward, writer
- Paul E. Harney Jr., Artist
- Carl Hein, clergyman
- Marguerite Martyn, journalist
- Fannie E. McKinney Hughey, music educator
- Louise McNair, educator
- Elizabeth Avery Meriwether, suffragist and author
- Bessie Morse, educator
- Alice Curtice Moyer, writer and suffragist
- Hannah D. Pittman, journalist and librettist
- Frances Porcher, writer and journalist
- Helen R. Rathbun, artist
- Charlie Russell, artist
- Adele Schulenburg, sculptor
- Frederick Oakes Sylvester, painter
- Caroline G. Thummel, attorney
- Adeline Palmier Wagoner, social leader
- Sophronia Wilson Wagoner, missionary and social worker
- Berenice Wyer, pianist, composer and lecturer
- Frances Cushman Wines, real estate pioneer
