= Gerhard Sisters =

American photographers

Emme and Mayme Gerhard
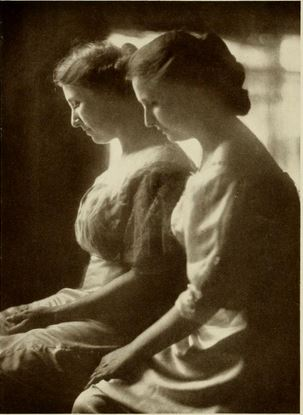
- The Gerhard Sisters, 1914 from Notable Women of St. Louis
- Born: Emme and Mayme Gerhard; Emme, 1872; Mayme, 1876; St. Louis, Missouri
- Died: Emme, 1946; Mayme, 1955; Emme, North Hempstead, New York; Mayme, St. Louis
- Occupation: Photographers
- Years active: 1890s–1941
- Known for: Photographic innovation

Emme Gerhard (1872–1946) and Mayme Gerhard (1876–1955), the Gerhard Sisters, were among the first women photographers to establish a studio in St. Louis, Missouri, in 1903. At the time newspapers and magazines rarely hired women as staff photographers to capture late breaking news.

== Early life ==
The Gerhards' parents came to the United States as children from Cologne, Germany, in the mid-1800s. They settled in Mascoutah, Illinois, and had moved to St. Louis, Missouri, by 1869. Their father worked successively as a teamster, butcher, and storekeeper in the large German-American community, which included a large number of photographers, retouchers and engravers.

== Career ==
The Gerhards began their photography careers as young women. They studied for three years with Fitz W. Guerin, the best-known St. Louis portraitist and a photographer of staged scenes. When Guerin retired in January 1903, the Gerhards acquired his studio and negatives. Their timing was perfect. Five years of renovations in the city between 1899 and the World's Fair in 1904 put the Gerhard Sisters in the heart of a new St. Louis at the height of the Progressive political era. They developed new and original ideas and methods which, as they have applied to portrait photography, gave a value and beauty of execution equal to painted portraits.

They had a branch studio in North St. Louis, but their main studio on Olive Street, near Grand Avenue, was built under their supervision, and in accordance with the purposes they had in view. There were seven or eight rooms, and the first thing noticeable was the absence of photographic properties; the rooms had very large, many-paned windows, broad window seats, fireplaces, cozy corners, etc. They were decorated in soft, warm tones that made the whole atmosphere inviting and restful. The conventional light, at an angle of forty-five degrees, as taught by photographers, was ignored, and only the natural light of everyday life entered into their compositions. In such an atmosphere the sitter unconsciously relaxed and lost the sense of posing which was associated with having one's "picture taken". This was the condition the Gerhards considered essential for the production of their "character pictures".

After studying the portraits painted by the old masters, Gerhard asked the question: "What qualities have these painters put into their work that makes them still 'alive' after centuries have elapsed?" It must be the soul, the real self of the subject, which so often eludes the camera, and they devoted themselves to developing this feature in their portraits. She endeavored to induce her subjects to forget the old "sit up and look pleasant" attitude which was almost impossible when one's head was supported by an iron hook and which one could not forget for a second. Their pictures were never retouched, stray hairs or blemishes were left just as the merciless camera showed them. The aim of the Gerhard pictures was the quintessence of naturalness. Groups were arranged before the fireplace as if in the home, chatting in cozy corners, playing games, singing and dancing; in fact, in all the pleasures and occupations that constitute daily life. The electric light used for pictures taken in the homes, made it possible to reproduce any part of a house; it was the first one used west of New York. When their mode of coloring or tinting photographs was used, the resemblance to oil paintings was startling in its result, especially when the "character" were successfully drawn out of a subject.

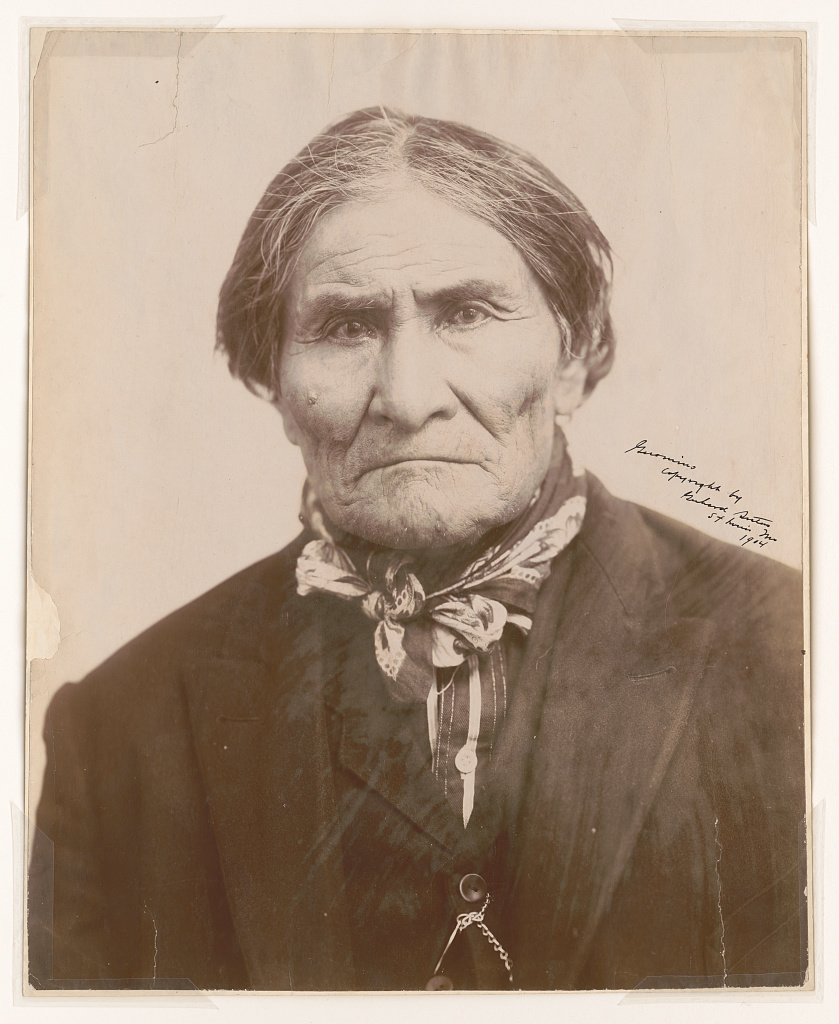
Geronimo, by the Gerhards

Many portraits were made during the Louisiana Purchase Exposition in 1904, when tribes from all parts of the world were represented. The director of the Field Museum of Natural History saw the opportunity to get a valuable ethnological collection if he could get a photographer, so he called on Charles Carpenter, the museum's staff photographer, Frances Benjamin Johnston and the Gerhard Sisters. They agreed to take pictures of all the Native Americans and other ethnic groups he could bring, and their collection is a rare one. One of those portraits is that of Geronimo, that contains an accidental "portrait" of the photographer at work. It is reflected in Geronimo's eye and was discovered in 2009 when the Library's photo conservator realized someone was looking back at her as she worked. The "portrait" shows a woman wearing a white shirtwaist blouse with a dark skirt, the uniform of the New Woman of the 1890s and early 1900s.

The Gerhard Sisters attended every convention in the interest of photography, and their work attracted much attention. They explained their methods, and were always on the lookout for new ideas, keeping abreast with all late developments. Many medals and honorable mention were awarded them. The Photo-Era Magazine, an American journal of photography, placed on its front cover of the September issue of 1913 one of the pictures displayed by them at the convention in Kansas City of the same year, and which was considered one of the best shown at that convention. It represented a young girl holding a vase of flowers, the beauty of the expression being caught by the camera in a charming and happy way.

The Gerhards attended photography conventions at least as early as 1905 in Boston, and photography periodicals report their attendance at conventions in major cities across the United States through 1920. Mayme Gerhard frequently served as an officer in the organizations while Emme Gerhard provided most of the speeches, demonstrations, and photographs for exhibitions. Her 1916 talk, "Portrait-Lighting with Mercury-Vapor Lamps", was published as an article under both their names by the Cooper Hewitt Electric Company, Hoboken, New Jersey.

The Gerhards held office and won prizes in the Missouri Photographers' Association and the Missouri Valley Association but were most involved in the Women's Federation of the Photographers' Association of America. Organized in 1910 as a resource for the increasing number of women entering the photography field, the Women's Federation existed for only nine years but played an important role in educating and promoting the works of women photographers. It held exhibitions of women's photographs at annual meetings and organized lectures, demonstrations, and exhibits throughout the country in studios run by women. When the Women's Federation merged with the Photographer's Association, Mayme Gerhard was the first woman to hold national office. Both sisters were member of the Royal Photographic Society. Emme joined in 1937 and she gained her Associate and then Fellowship in 1939. Maymee joined in 1940 and gained her Associate in 1940. Emme also exhibited in the RPS's annual exhibition in 1937, 1938 and 1941.

The Gerhard Sisters joined the push to have photography considered as artistic expression rather than mechanical reproduction, as their 1916 letter to the editor of Bulletin of Photography shows. They cited seeing their local museum displaying Indian pottery, lace, and mummies, and New York's Metropolitan Museum exhibiting snuff boxes and the Pittsburgh Art Museum showing several rooms of amateur art while the St. Louis Museum refused since 1914 to exhibit their photographs because it defined them as mechanics. They implored the Photographer's Association of America to take up their cause.

The sisters found their occupation still dominated by men in 1917 when Emme Gerhard told a reporter, "We know that being women we must expect to do our work as well and then a little better than men if we would be recognized and accepted and compete upon equal terms with men." She acknowledged gender discrimination in photo contests, continuing, "Our first prizes were not won until our entries went in without other identification marks than numbers."

Photography clubs denied women membership as did advertising organizations. In June 1917, when the Associated Advertising Clubs of the World held its thirteenth annual convention in St. Louis, women were permitted to attend even though the local chapter excluded women from membership. Mayme Gerhard was one of three local women "honored by the National Program Committee by being placed on the program for the women's conference."

== Personal lives ==
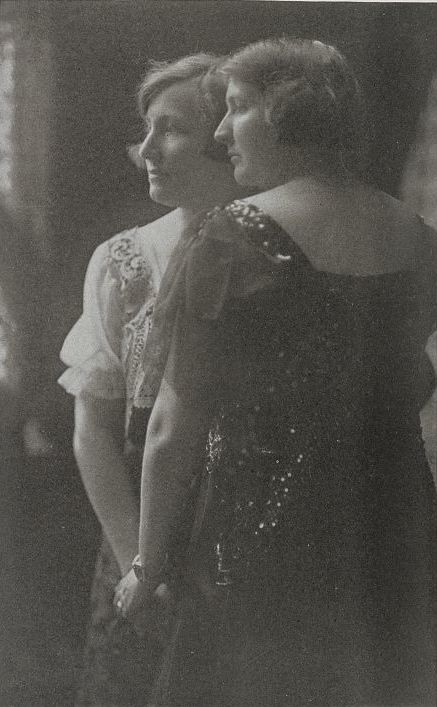
Emme and Mayme Gerhard

The Gerhards held leadership roles in professional organizations and became fellows in England's Royal Photographic Society. Their images and business acumen enabled them to attain economic independence and even travel for pleasure. They worked together until 1936 and afterwards continued to explore their own photographic specialties. They are noteworthy examples of women who integrated their responsibilities at home with their participation in the public sphere.

In about 1899, Emme Gerhard married Albert W. Rhein, a stationery engraver. They lived in St. Louis with Emme Gerhard's parents and Albert's brother Russell G. Rhein, also a photographer. Emme Gerhard worked as a photographer's helper. On October 12, 1906, the Rheins had a son, Gerhard, while living in Eureka Springs, Arkansas. In the 1920 census, Emme Gerhard was listed as a widow, living with her son in the home of her sister, Mayme Gerhard. Emme's husband, however, was listed as divorced, and living in a St. Louis household that included his sister Alice, a photo retoucher.

Mayme Gerhard, married Thomas Goodale Hawley, a dentist who was formerly a photographer himself. The couple lived at 1824 Lami Street in St. Louis, sometimes with some of Mayme's siblings. The extended Gerhard family worked as photographers with the Gerhard Sisters employing their sisters and brother in the photo studio occasionally. The sisters were economically self-sufficient, raised children who became self-supporting, and had the means to travel as far as England and Hawaii.

The Gerhards lost many of their valuable images in a February 1905 fire in their studio that destroyed more than 300 of their glass plate World's Fair negatives. Mayme Gerhard valued them at $10,000 (equivalent to $260,000 in 2017) at the time.

The Gerhard sisters maintained studios at several places in St. Louis until Emme Gerhard left in July 1936 to study "the art of the primitive" at an artist colony near Mexico City for a month before relocating to New York where she lived with her son, Gerhard R. Gerhard, a lawyer in Port Washington, New York. She exhibited regularly at the International Salon of Photography in the United States, Canada and Western Europe and her photographs generally received awards. In 1938, she was made a fellow of the Royal Photographic Society of England. Emme Gerhard died in 1946.

Mayme Gerhard operated the studio with her daughter Vera Hawley Smith until 1941 after her husband died in 1935 and Emme Gerhard left St. Louis. As Mayme Gerhard Hawley, she died in St. Louis on October 16, 1955.

== Legacy ==
The Library of Congress Prints and Photographs Division acquired its Gerhard holdings through copyright deposits and has more than 100 photos made between 1904 and the early 1920s, primarily their work with ethnic portraits at the St. Louis World's Fair and studio portraits from the 1910s. Many of the magazines and newspapers where their images were originally published are available for study through the Library's general collection and newspaper research centers. The bulk of their surviving papers and photographs are at the Missouri Historical Society and the Smithsonian Museum of Natural History.

== Gallery ==
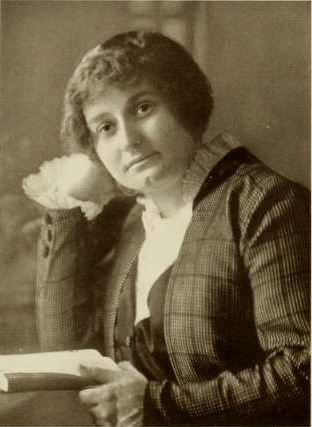
Amabel Anderson Arnold

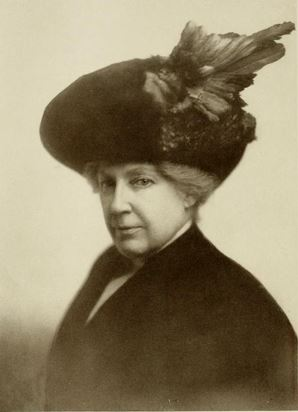
Annie Laurie Y. Orff

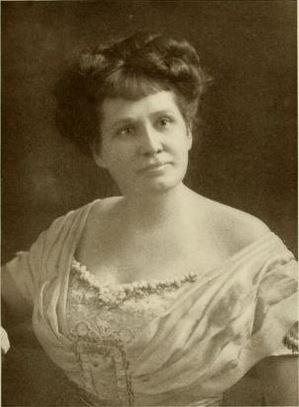
Annie Rooney Knight

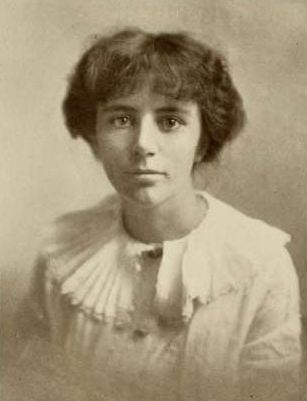
Caroline Risque

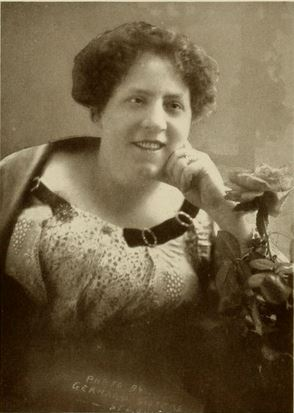
Clara Estelle Baumhoff

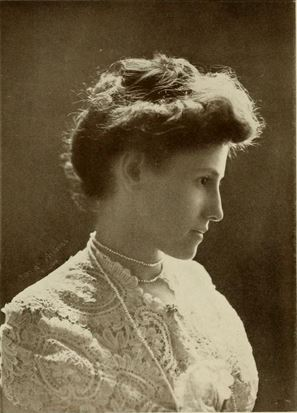
Daisy E. Nirdlinger

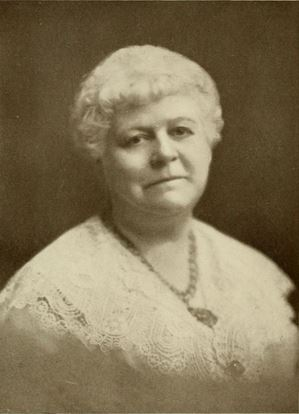
Frances Cushman-Wines

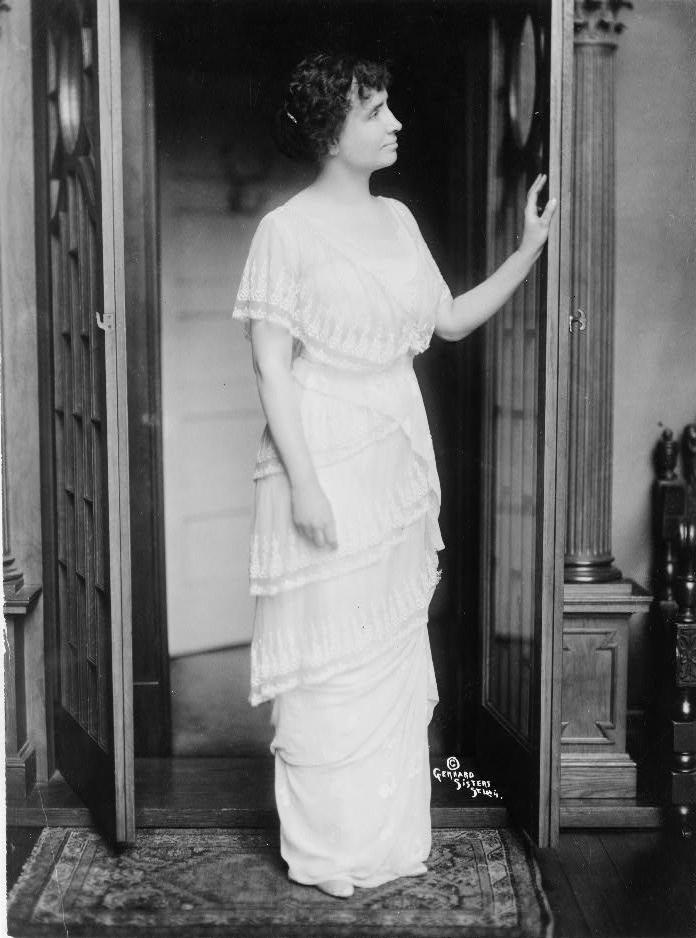
Helen Keller

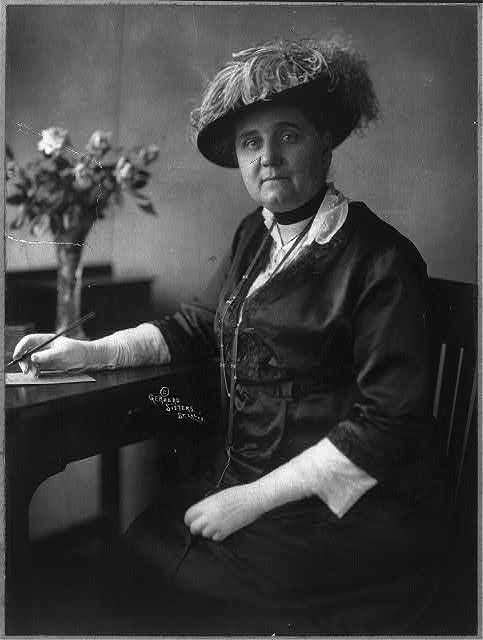
Jane Addams

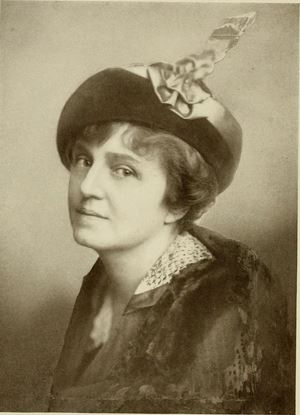
July H. Thomson

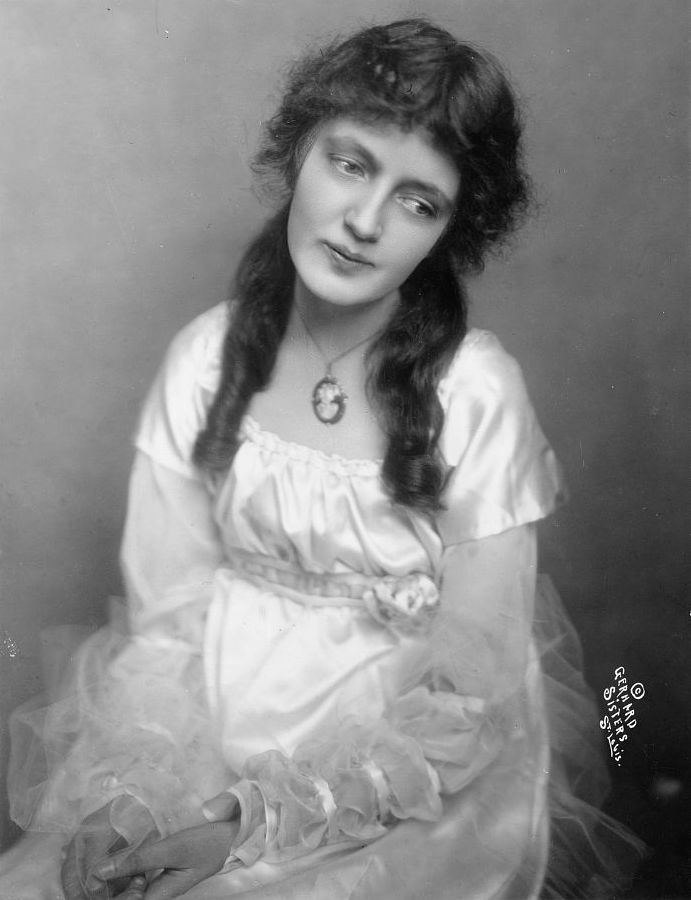
Mary Kean

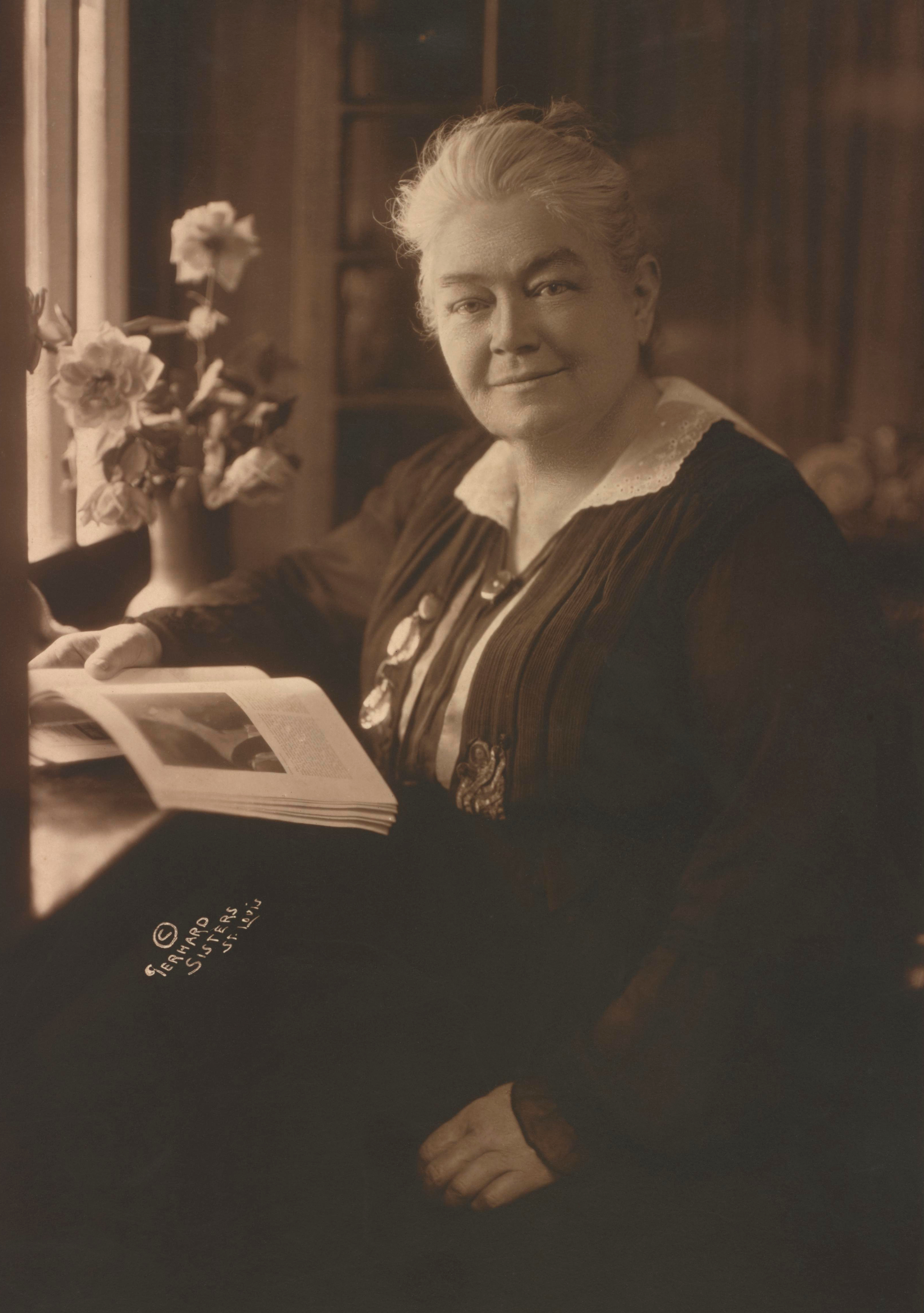
1916 photo of Laura Clay, an American suffragist from Kentucky, including their copyright notice
