= Benton College of Law =

Law school in St. Louis, Missouri

Benton College of Law was a law school in St. Louis, Missouri. It opened in 1896 (129 years ago) as Kent School of Law, and incorporated as Benton School of Law in 1897. George L. Corlis was its dean. James Avery Webb helped establish the school.

The school initially only offered night classes. In 1899, an act of the Missouri legislature allowed graduates to be admitted to the Missouri bar without taking the bar exam. By 1921, the college was offering both day and night classes. It closed in 1937.

Several documents related to the college are extant including copies of addresses given to graduating classes. Henry S. Priest spoke to the graduating class in 1914.

== Alumni ==
- Myles P. Dyer
- W. J. Doran
- Aloys P. Kaufmann
- Richard Ralph (politician)
- John Keating Regan
- Marion Charles Matthes
- Amabel Anderson Arnold
- Jacob Edwin Meeker
- Thomas C. Hennings Jr.
- William McChesney Martin
