= Senator Doran =

Senator Doran may refer to:

- Michael Doran (politician) (1827–1915), Minnesota State Senate
- W. J. Doran (1886–1949), Missouri State Senate
