= Florence Hayward (writer) =

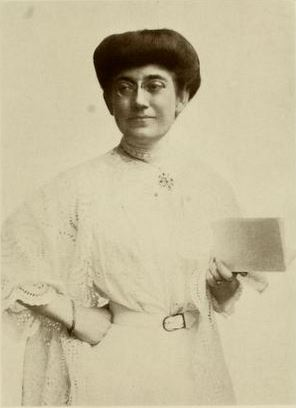
- Florence Hayward by Takuma Kajiwara
- Born: 1855; New Mexico Territory
- Died: July 4, 1925 (aged 69–70); St. Louis
- Known for: being the only woman on the 1904 World's Fair Board in St Louis

Florence Hayward (1855 – July 4, 1925) was a St. Louis, Missouri, writer, best known for her Travel Letters.

== Biography ==
Florence Hayward was born in 1855 in New Mexico, the daughter of Col. George A. Hayward, of the Confederate Army. He moved to St. Louis after the war, with his family. After public school, Florence Hayward graduated from Mary Institute after already contributing to Washington University's student paper. Hayward was twice the president of the Alumnae Association of Mary Institute.

Hayward was offered a position with The Spectator after she wrote an article for an editor of a St. Louis paper who was ill. She held this job for two years before her family knew.

In 1892 there was a season of opera in Chicago, and she decided to have an interview with a newspaper editor and suggest sending her to Chicago to write a series of articles and criticisms in advance of the St. Louis season. She received the appointment and attended the rehearsals to tell the readers what they might see that evening. She attended eight performances a week, and wrote a column each day. She was assisted in this by Pol Plancon, the De Rezkes, Emma Eames and other singers in the company.

During her residence in London writing dramatic and musical criticisms, she began contributing to magazines, both American and English, while sending letters to the daily papers in St. Louis, as a special correspondent, on any subject that came before the public which she thought might be of general interest.

In 1896, returning to St. Louis, she remained only six weeks, then went abroad again and stayed until 1899 writing for both American and English papers.

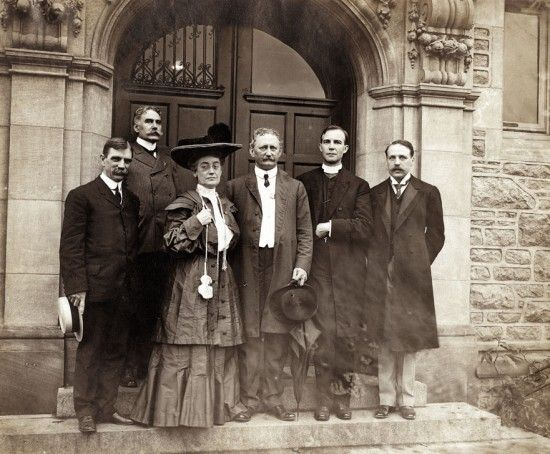
St. Louis mayor Rolla Wells, Frank D. Hershberg, Florence Hayward, Fair president David R. Francis, Archbishop John J. Glennon, and Vatican commissioner Signor Coquitti (l to r) at the opening of the Vatican Exhibit at the 1904 World's Fair. Photograph by Jessie Tarbox Beals.

Hayward became involved with the Louisiana Purchase Exposition in St Louis after she was asked by an agent to misrepresent a play named America. She was told that the play should be recommended because it was linked to the Chicago's World's Fair. This proved not to be the case and she shared this information with the organisers in St Louis. As a result, she was given an appointment by the fair's board. She was given a large salary to go abroad and select material to exhibit at the Exposition. Hayward and the board annoyed the "Board of Lady Managers" as they understood that they world represent women's affairs. Hayward took little notice of their status, and she was the only woman member of the main board.

Hayward set off and in London she found they had just recovered from the Boer War. Instead of beginning with the manufacturers she went to the King to request the Queen's Jubilee presents should be exhibited. At the next meeting of President D. R. Francis and the commissioners in London, it was her pleasure to inform them of her success in reserving valuable exhibits. Her next move was to go to Italy and get the Pope to give his consent to making a Vatican exhibit, which had never been done before. Through Cardinal Satolli arrangements were consummated.

Francis put her in charge of historical exhibits in the anthropology division, which had originally been assigned to Pierre Chouteau III who had made little progress. Despite being the only woman on the Board of Commissioners she created successful anthropological exhibits, publicizing the fair, and acquiring significant exhibit items. When Francis published a history of the fair in 1913, he did not mention Hayward's contributions and she never forgave the slight.

Hayward was included in photographs of the St Louis fair organisers and she was given authority to negotiate exhibits, but in the end she received no more credit that the Board of Lady Managers, who were also sidelined. Although it was noted that the directors of the World's Fair presented her with the same kind of medal that was sent to the Kings, the Pope, and other heads of nations. Hayward's success grew out of an acquaintance with international politics, and her taking advantage of the Venezuelan situation as between Great Britain and the United States. She suggested to the King, through the Ambassador, that he show his friendly feeling to the United States by making this loan. The presents were sent to the United States wholly through her diplomatic efforts, and she made her own selections from both palaces and museums. Six guards accompanied the shipment.

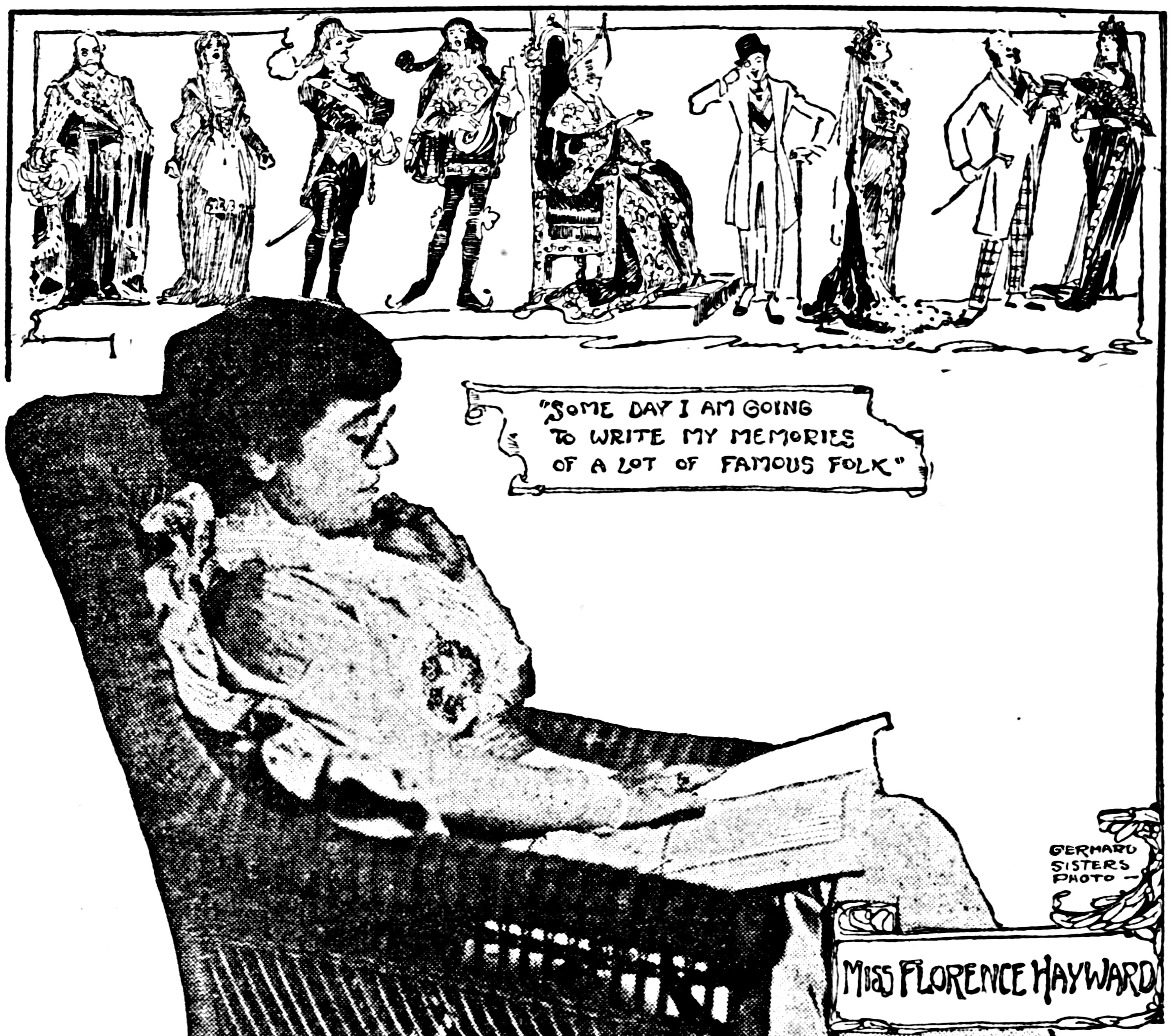
Journalist Marguerite Martyn made this composite for the St. Louis Post-Dispatch in 1914 from a photo by the Gerhard Sisters, with Martyn's drawings representing notable people whom Hayward had met.

Her Travel Letters to the different newspapers in St. Louis from abroad and they would include a wide variety of subjects. For many years she was a contributor to The Century and Harper's Bazaar magazines in America, and Country Life, Pall Mall Gazette, Jerome's Idler and the Daily Mail in London. For a long time she was the only woman writer for English Country Life.

== The Artists' Guild ==
As the founder of the Artists' Guild, her idea was to establish a permanent guild; previous "Painters," "Brush and Pencil" Clubs, and others, had not lasted. She thought to bring together the painters, sculptors, architects, musicians and literary people, and time proved her to have been right. The first meetings were held at the home of Hayward for nearly two years; later when the number grew larger — in other places; first in the old art museum, and after that in club rooms of their own in different localities, until the erection of their building on Union Avenue, of which Louis C. Spiering was the architect. The membership was limited to about two hundred. The work of the members was on exhibition to the public, and was open at all times. Hayward became the secretary of the guild and held that office several times. She was also the treasurer, as well as chairman of the examination committee — a title corresponding to that of president.

== Honours and legacy ==
Hayward was presented at the Royal Court, as well as the Vatican, where a private audience with the Pope was granted. In 1904 she was made Officer d'Instruction Publique by the French Government. The Royal Society of Arts of Great Britain appointed her a member, and also a Fellow of the Royal Meteorological Society.

She died on July 4, 1925, at the home of her brother at 5843 Waterman Avenue, St. Louis, where she lived, and is buried at Bellefontaine Cemetery.

The Florence Hayward Papers, 1880–1941, are hosted at the Missouri Historical Society.
