= Kathryn E. Cherry =

American artist (1880–1931)

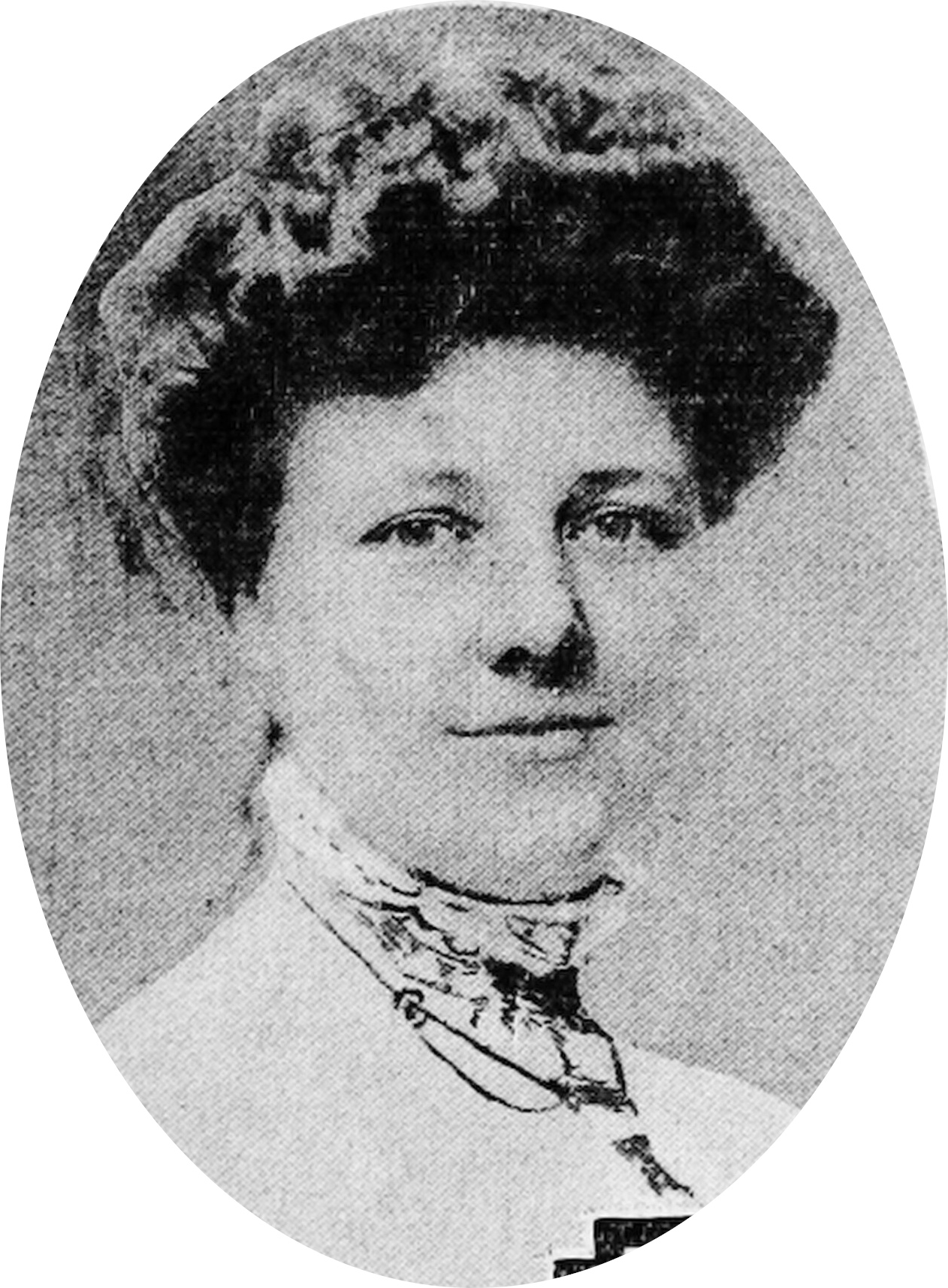
- Cherry in 1913
- Born: Kathryn Evelyn Bard; April 27, 1871; Quincy, Illinois, U.S.
- Died: November 19, 1931 (aged 60); St. Louis, Missouri, US
- Education: St. Louis School of Fine Arts; New York School of Arts; Pennsylvania Academy of Fine Arts
- Movement: Post-impressionism

Kathryn Evelyn Bard Cherry (April 27, 1871 – November 19, 1931) was an American artist and educator. She painted marine scenes, floral still life, and landscapes.

== Early life and education ==
Cherry was born on April 27, 1871 in Quincy, Illinois and was educated at the St. Louis School of Fine Arts, New York School of Arts, and Pennsylvania Academy of Fine Arts.

== Career ==
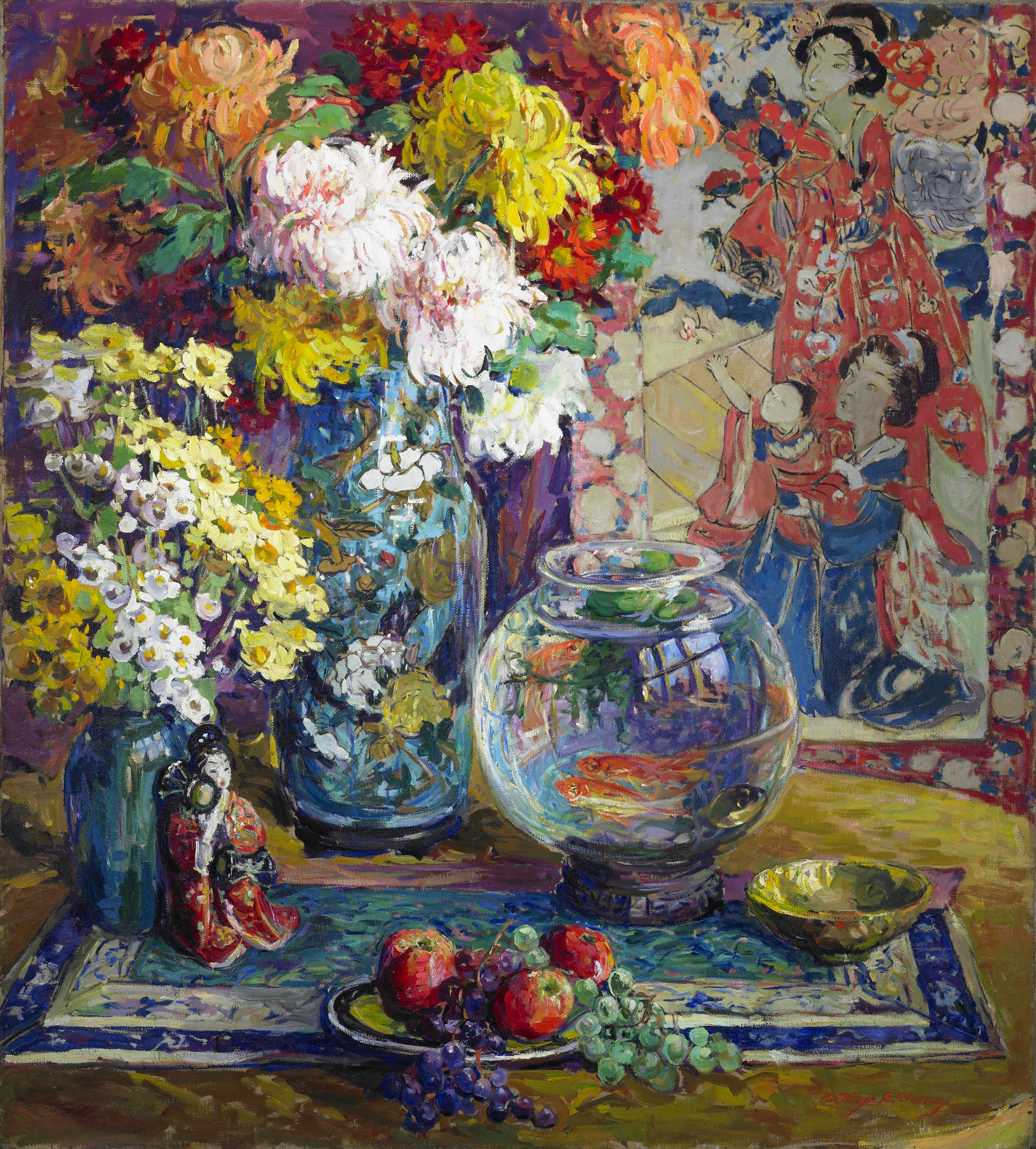
Fish, Fruits, and Flowers

During the 1904 St. Louis World's Fair, Cherry's china paintings earned her a gold medal for female art. Two years later she began exhibiting her creations at the Saint Louis Artist's Guild. During this time period she was appointed "Master Craftsman" by the Boston Society of Arts and Crafts.

By 1912, Cherry and her sister Jessie M. Bard were chosen to teach at the Dawson Dawson-Watson Summer School of Painting and Handcraft. From 1915-1931, Cherry was the Art Director at The Principia succeeding the school's first Art Director, Frederick Oakes Sylvester.

Cherry exhibited her works at the annual shows of the St. Louis Art League, the Kansas City Art Institute, and the Pennsylvania Academy. Her work often displayed marine scenes, floral still life, and landscapes of St. Louis. In 1924, her painting Fish, Fruit, and Flowers earned her a gold medal at the Kansas City Art Museum exhibition.

In 1926, her paintings at the Women's National Exposition earned her and Elizabeth Price a $1,000 prize and later a bronze medal at a Kansas art exhibition. Cherry died on November 19, 1931 in St Louis, Missouri.
