= Fitz W. Guerin =

Medal of Honor recipient and photographer

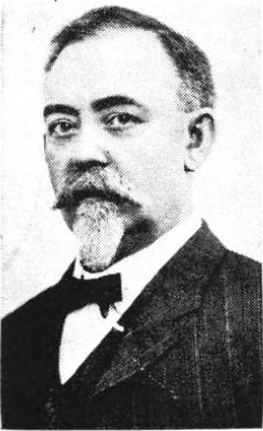
- Born: March 17, 1846; New York City, New York
- Died: July 11, 1903 (aged 57); St. Louis, MO
- Burial place: Bellefontaine Cemetery
- Military career
- Allegiance: United States of America
- Branch: United States Army
- Service years: 1861 - 1865
- Rank: Sergeant
- Unit: Battery A, 1st Missouri Light Artillery
- Conflicts: Battle of Fredericktown; Battle of Hill's Plantation; Battle of Port Gibson; Battle of Champion Hill; Battle of Big Black River Bridge; Siege of Vicksburg, May 19 and May 22 assaults Bayou Teche Campaign; Red River Campaign
- Awards: Medal of Honor
- Other work: Photographer

Fitz W. Guerin (March 17, 1846 – July 11, 1903) was a recipient of the Medal of Honor in the American Civil War. On returning to civilian life, he became a successful society photographer in St. Louis, Missouri.

== Early life ==
He was born in New York City, New York. At 13, he set out on his own and worked for the Merrill Drug Company in St. Louis and Western Union.

== American Civil War ==
He joined the Union Army as a teenager and served under Generals William Tecumseh Sherman, Nathaniel Lyon and Ulysses S. Grant. For his actions in conjunction with Sergeant Henry A. Hammel and Private Joseph Pesch on April 28 and 29, 1863, Private Guerin was awarded the Medal of Honor on March 10, 1896.

=== Medal of Honor citation ===
The President of the United States of America, in the name of Congress, takes pleasure in presenting the Medal of Honor to Private Fitz W. Guerin, United States Army, for extraordinary heroism on April 28 and 29, 1863, while serving with Battery A, 1st Missouri Light Artillery, in action at Grand Gulf, Mississippi. With two comrades Private Guerin voluntarily took position on board the steamer Cheeseman, in charge of all the guns and ammunition of the battery, and remained in charge of the same for a considerable time while the steamer was unmanageable and subjected to a heavy fire from the enemy.

General Orders: Date of Issue: March 10, 1896

Action Date: April 28 & 29, 1863

Service: Army

Rank: Private

Company: Battery A

Division: 1st Missouri Light Artillery

== Photography career ==
After the war, he returned to St. Louis and did menial jobs at a photographic gallery. He found better pay stringing telegraph wire for a railroad, but returned to photography, going into partnership and setting up Remington, Guerin, and Mills Gallery in Ottumwa, Iowa. He was eventually bought out and returned to St. Louis, where he worked for several established photographers, learning the trade.

Finally, in 1876, he set up shop on his own. When he won an award at the 1878 Paris World's Fair, he became an overnight success. He established a reputation, received international recognition for his portraits, and was several times president of the National Photographic Society. He opened several more galleries in the city, owning a total of six over his 27-year career. A 1982 American Heritage magazine article labeled him a "turbid Victorian hack", though it did concede he was technically gifted. Some of his photographs are held by the Library of Congress.

Pioneering women photographers Emme and Mayme Gerhard studied with him for three years. When he retired in January 1903, he sold his studio to them.

Guerin died of a heart attack on July 11, 1903. He was buried at Bellefontaine Cemetery in St. Louis, the same resting place as his Medal of Honor co-recipients, Hammel and Pesch.

Photographs by Fitz W. Guerin

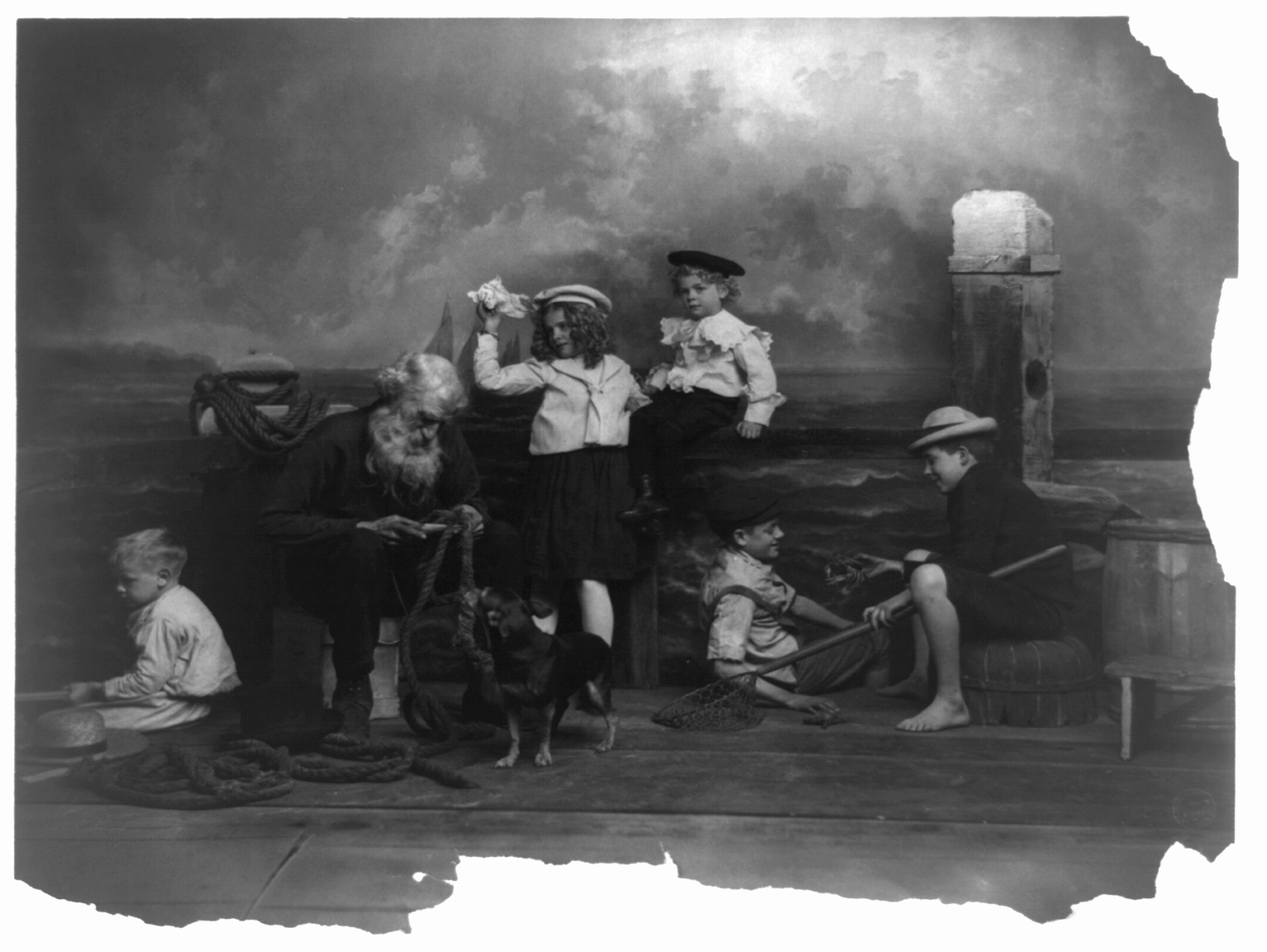

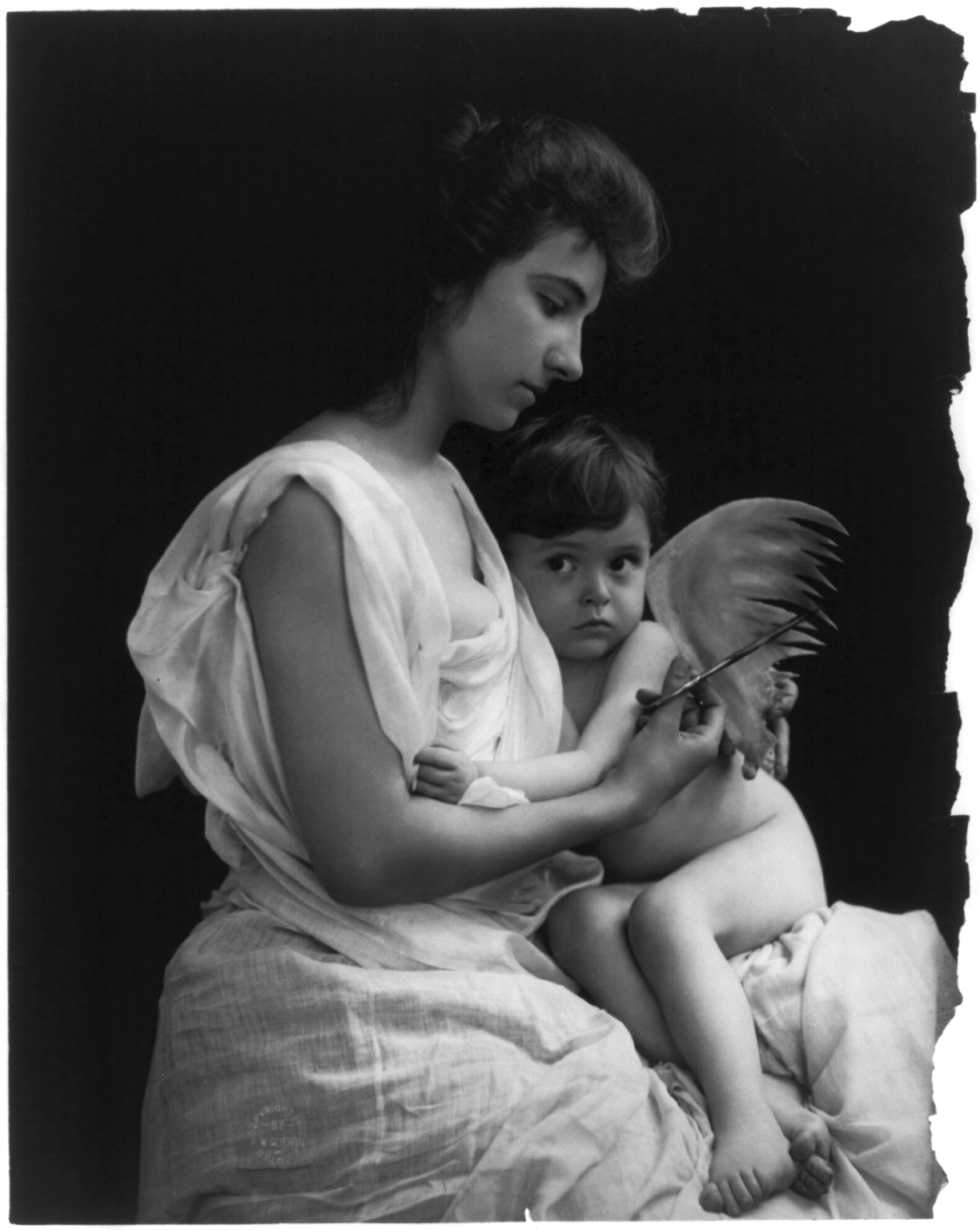

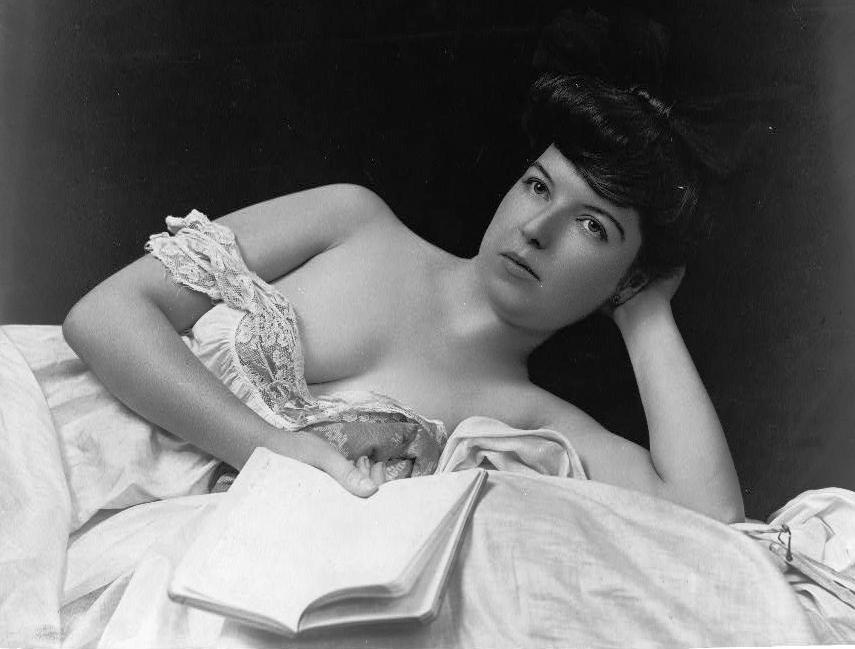

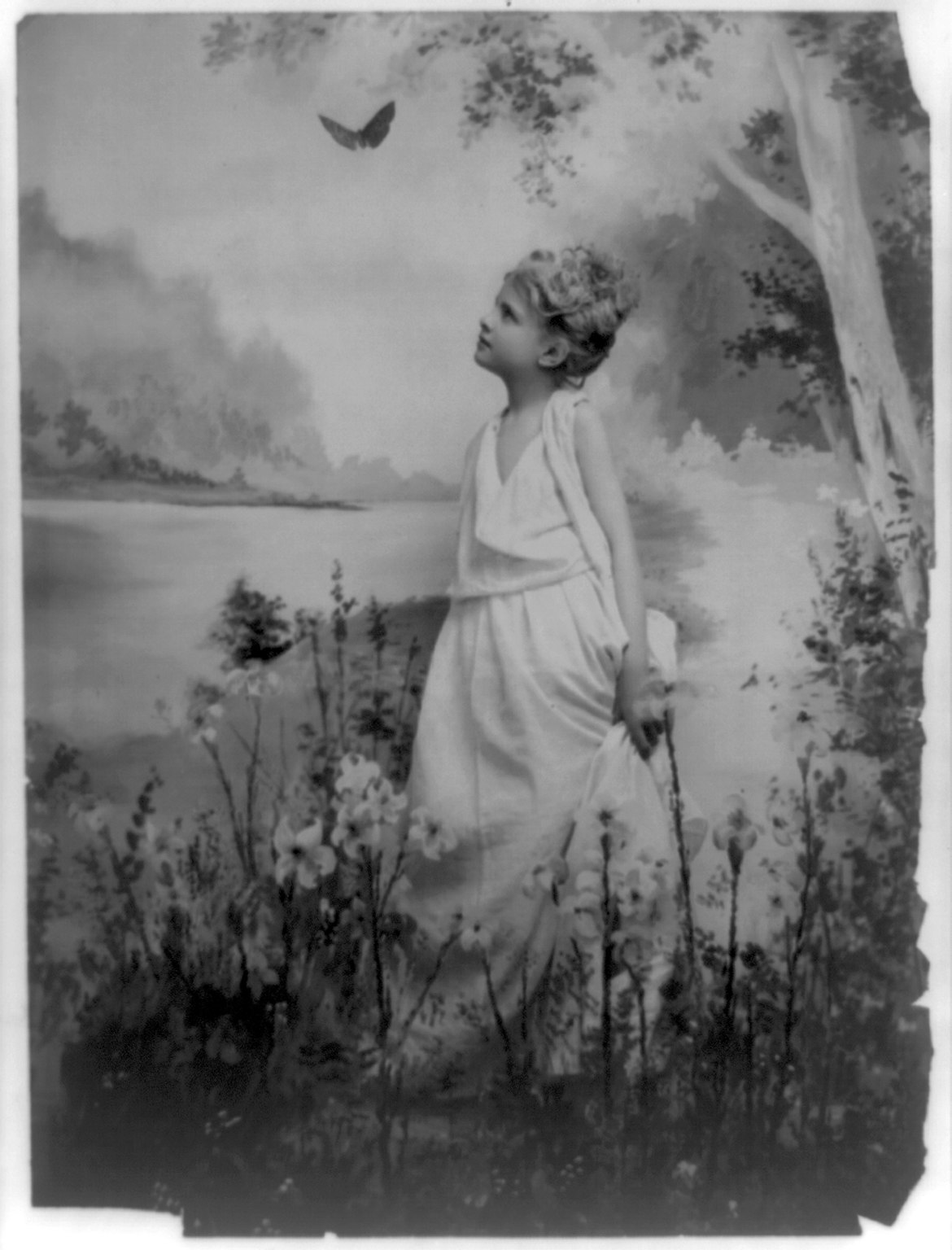
