= Elise J. Blattner =

American traveler, lecturer (1854–1926)

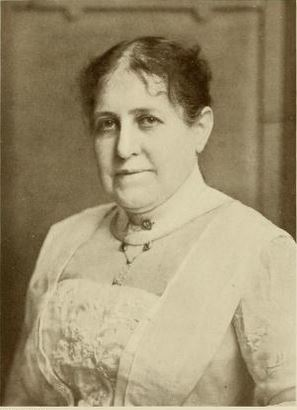
Elise Blattner by Takuma Kajiwara

Elise Jecko Blattner (1854–1926) was a traveler and lecturer who was reputed to be the first person west of the Allegheny Mountains to illustrate her talks with lantern slides.

== Personal ==
Elise Jecko was born on or about May 13, 1854, in St. Louis, Missouri. to Joseph Jecko of Alsace and Clara Heimbach of Koblenz.

She won a university scholarship through her record in high school but did not accept it.

She had a daughter, Clara Blattner, born in St. Louis on October 15, 1877. Clara graduated from Wellesley College.

At the age of 25, Elise J. Blattner was married to John Forsting on April 15, 1879, in St. Louis. She was later married to Henry Blattner, who died about 1922. They were still married in 1909.

She was fluent in Japanese and German.

In 1913, she was living at 2914A Arkansas Avenue, St. Louis. In 1917, she and her daughter were living at the same address. She listed her occupation as "lecturer." She died of uremia and chronic nephritis at Barnes Hospital on June 8, 1926, after an eight-week illness. She was survived by her daughter. Her body was cremated on June 10, 1926.

== Professional ==
Henry Blattner, her husband, was a skilled amateur photographer who assisted in making the lantern slides for her lectures. "She was the first person to use lantern illustrations for art lectures west of the Alleghenies."

In 1889 she made her first trip to Europe, spending a year at the University of Berlin and returning with about two thousand photographs of art objects. In Berlin, she studied with Professor Hermann Grimm and, she said, "succeeded in overcoming Professor Grimm's objection to the lantern and persuaded him to have a fine one installed" in the university.

She spent many years after 1896 in travel, and in May 1906, she and her daughter, Clara, began a five years' residence in Japan.

In 1912, she and Clara returned to the United States aboard the SS Nippon Maru, sailing from Yokohama.

Clara was also a lecturer, demonstrating the No dance, flower arranging, the tea ceremony, bonsedi, or sand pictures and kōdō, an incense game.

Mrs. Charles P. Johnson, her biographer, said of her lectures that "her manner of delivery is the most polished imaginable; her voice is pleasing, resonant, and clear."
