= Frederick Oakes Sylvester =

American painter (1869–1915)

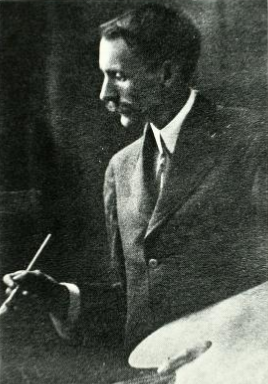
- Frederick Oakes Sylvester
- Born: October 8, 1869; Brockton, Massachusetts, U.S.
- Died: March 2, 1915 (aged 45); St. Louis, U.S.
- Education: Massachusetts Normal Art School
- Known for: Art educator; artist
- Movement: Arts and Crafts
- Spouse: Florence I. Gerry
- Awards: Bronze medal at the Louisiana Purchase Exposition

Frederick Oakes Sylvester (October 8, 1869 – March 2, 1915) was an American art educator and artist in the Arts and Crafts movement in St. Louis, Missouri.

== Biography ==
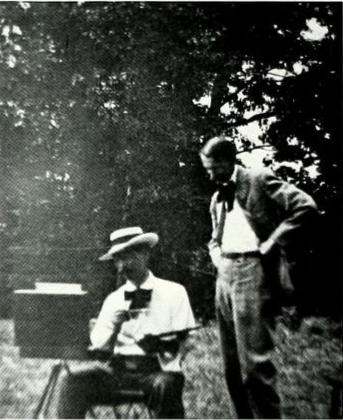
Takuma Kajiwara and Frederick Oakes Sylvester at Elsah

Frederick Oakes Sylvester was born in Brockton, Massachusetts, on October 8, 1869, the son of Charles Frederick Sylvester, a hardware dealer, and Mary Louise, who died two weeks after his birth.

Sylvester's father did not encourage his son's artistic aspirations, and Sylverster as a boy sold newspapers to buy art supplies. He attended high school in Fall River, Massachusetts, and during the summer of 1887 he hiked around Massachusetts and Connecticut with a friend, camping out and sketching. He entered Massachusetts Normal Art School in 1888 and took the six-year Teacher's Course. His aunt Rebecca Noyes and his great-aunt Hannah Soule, descendant of the Mayflower Soules, financially supported him in this period. He graduated in 3 years with honors in public speaking and reading.

From 1891 to 1892 he was the acting director of the Art Department of the H. Sophie Newcomb Memorial College at Tulane University, New Orleans.

On December 25, 1891, Sylvester married Florence I. Gerry, a Fall River schoolteacher. They had two children: Dorothy Louise (b. 1894) and Kilburn Gerry (b. 1899). In June 1892, Frederick O. Sylvester moved to St. Louis, Missouri, and took the position of art director at the Central High School. They lived at 5924 Horton Place, St. Louis. One of his pupils was Helen R. Rathbun. He also taught night classes at YMCA. In 1899 he was admitted to the Society of Western Artists and later became its vice-president. He was also member of the Two-by-Four Club, the Artists' Guild and the St. Louis Art League. The paintings of this period focus on the St. Louis' riverfront, specifically the area surrounding the Eads Bridge. In 1900 Sylvester exhibited twenty-five paintings of Eads Bridge at the St. Louis Exposition. By 1904 the paintings of the Eads Bridge amounted to over 100, and Sylvester became known as "the painter of the Eads Bridge". He was an impressionist documenting the growth of St. Louis' industrial life.

In 1902, Sylvester went to work part-time for The Principia, a young private school located at Page and Belt Avenues, St. Louis. In 1904, Sylvester won a bronze medal at the Louisiana Purchase Exposition and a silver medal at the Portland Exposition.

Takuma Kajiwara moved to St. Louis in 1905, "lured to the city partly by an offer of employment in a studio and even more by a desire to see the Mississippi River," according to his obituary in the St. Louis Star-Times. Kajiwara and Sylvester were friends. According to one account, their amity was "warm enough to cause them to cut wrists and mingle blood in a gesture of unity." Sylvester designed a silver watch fob for Kajiwara showing an artist and a photographer clasping hands, and carrying, on the reverse side, the statement: "No East no West, But hand in hand, Life's Unity, To Understand, T. Kajiwara, from:, F.O. Sylvester, 1909." Kajiwara did photographic work for The Great River, a book by Sylvester collecting his paintings of the Mississippi, published in 1911. Photos show the men painting together.

In 1906 Sylvester spent a period in Europe. Back from Europe, Sylvester started his second period, focused his paintings on the area around Elsah, Illinois. Elsah is a historic river town in Illinois and Sylvester owned a summer home, Oak Ledge, there which he bought in 1902. In Elsah, Sylvester tried to move beyond impressionism and the urban subjects of before towards the spiritual values of nature. In 1986, Paul O. Williams published Frederick Oakes Sylvester, The Artist's Encounter with Elsah. Frequent guest at Elsah were Kathryn E. Cherry, who succeeded Sylvester as The Principia's art director, and Takuma Kajiwara.

In 1906, Sylvester was awarded the Fine Arts Building of Chicago Prize by the Society of Western Artists. In 1909 and 1910 he served as president of the St. Louis Artists' Guild. In 1910, he exhibited 28 paintings in Columbia, Missouri, for the Art Lover's Guild and gave two lectures, Artists' Ideals and The Relation of Art to Life. In 1911, the St. Louis Art Museum held a major exhibition of 83 Sylvester paintings from the Elsah years.

He died in St. Louis on March 2, 1915, and, according to his wishes, a boat set out from Elsah upriver to the confluence of the Mississippi and Illinois Rivers, where his wife and Kajiwara sprinkled his ashes on the water.

Today, Frederick O. Sylvester's paintings hang in a number of institutions and private homes in the St. Louis' area.

== Gallery ==
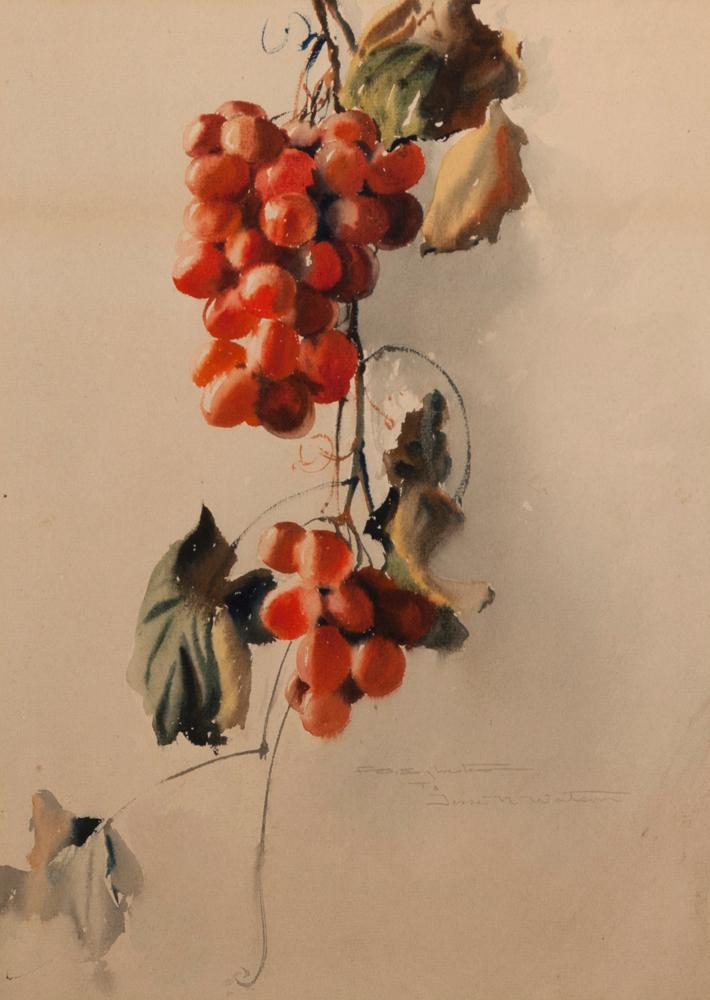
Grapes

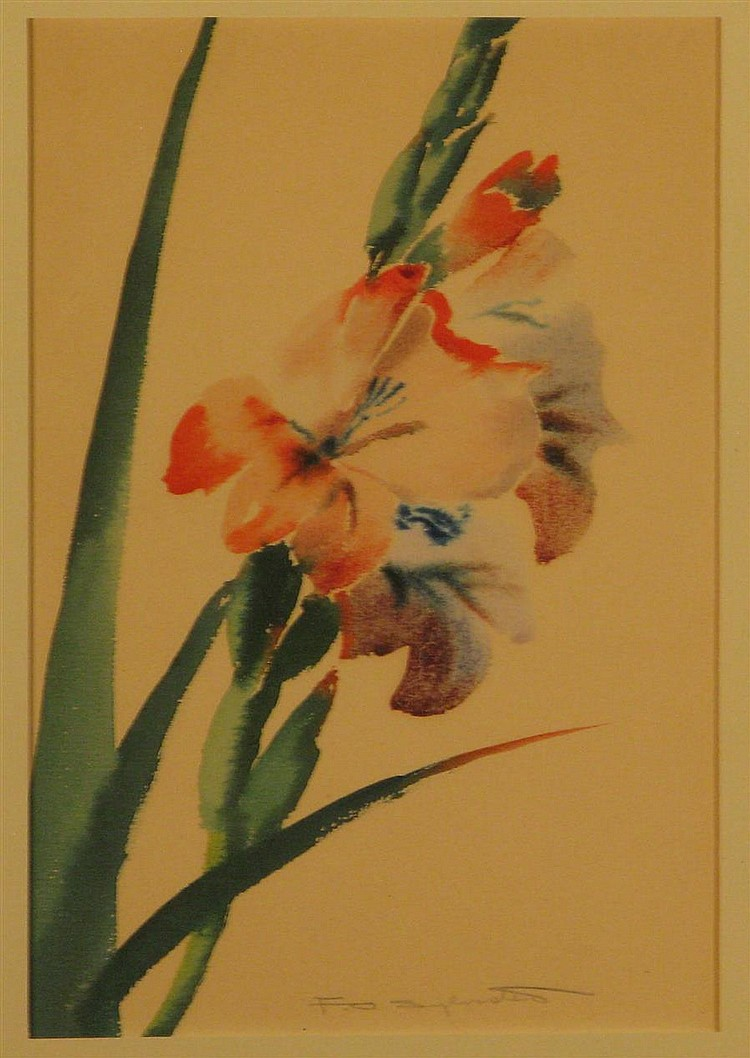
Gladiolas

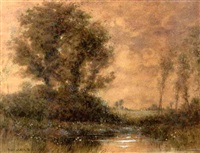
Landscape with trees and stream, 1885

Landscape with farm house, 1891

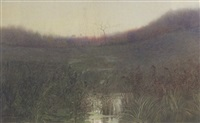
The meadow pool, 1893

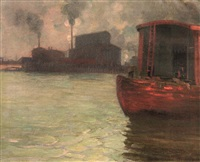
Mississippi harbor scene, 1897

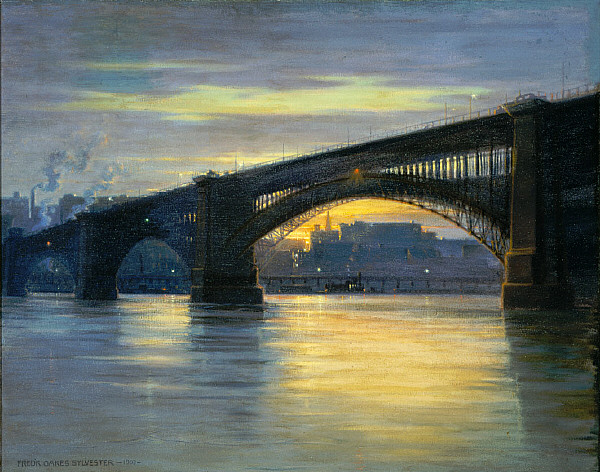
Eads Bridge

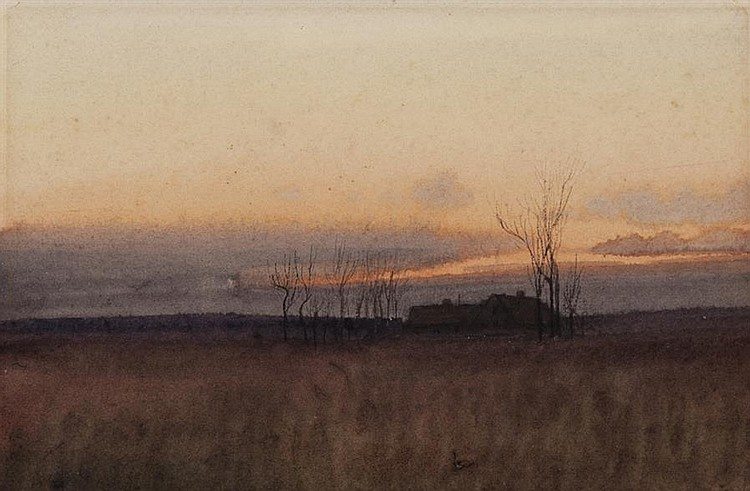
Sunset, March 15, 1900

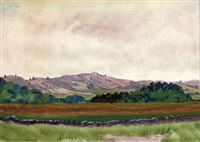
Landscape with rolling hills, 1902

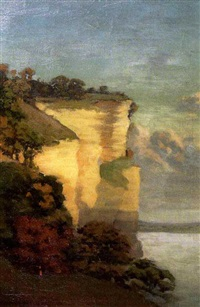
Bluffs along the river, 1902

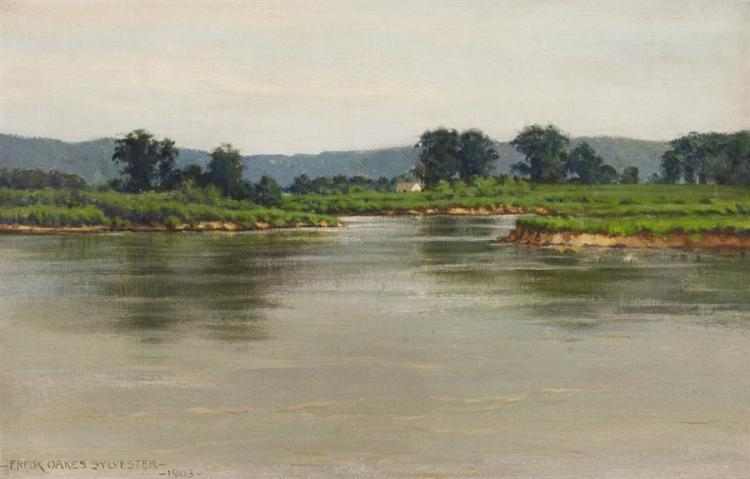
Missouri river scene, 1903

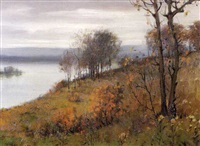
Along the Missouri river, 1904

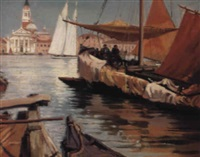
Venice, 1905

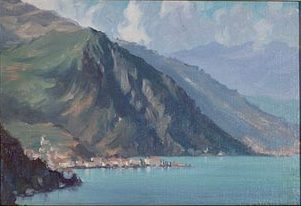
Menaggio, north from Cadenabbia, Italy

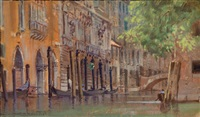
Venetian canal scene

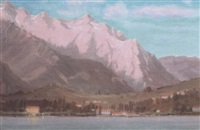
Lake Como

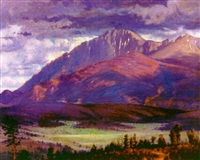
Bavarian landscape, 1906

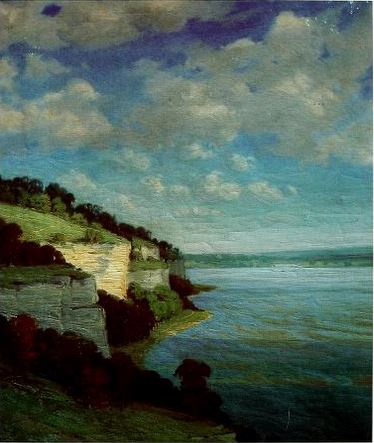
Elsah, c. 1906

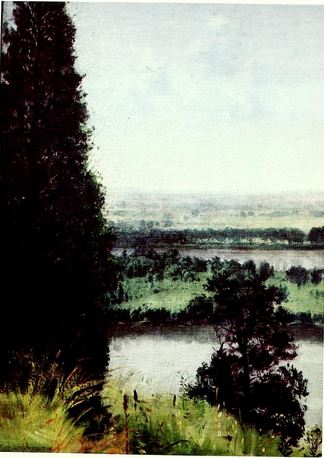
Elsah, c. 1906

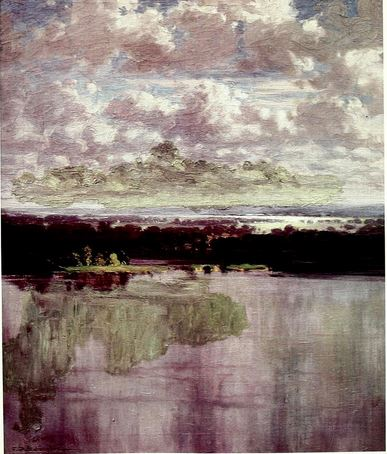
Elsah, c. 1906

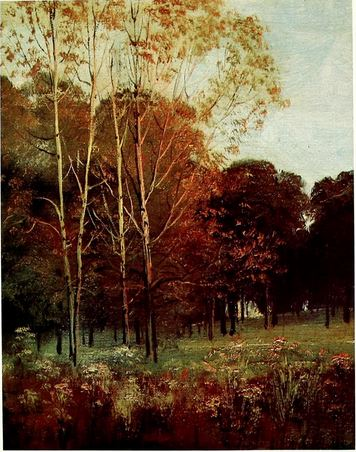
Elsah, c. 1906

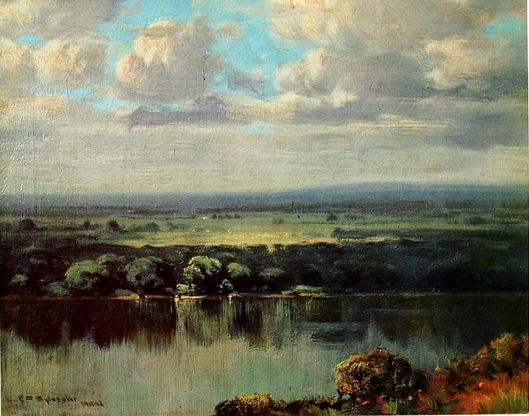
Elsah, c. 1906

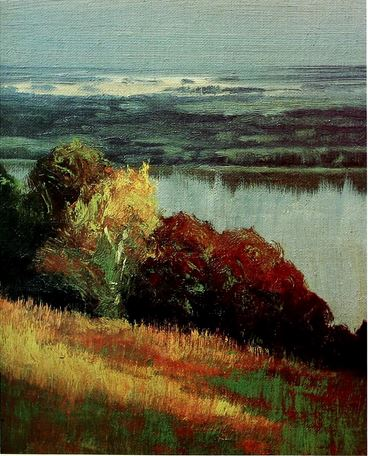
Elsah, c. 1906

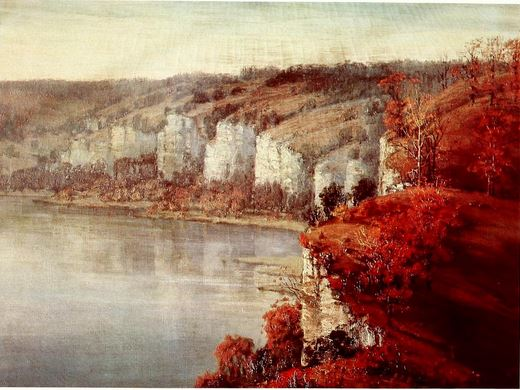
Elsah, c. 1906

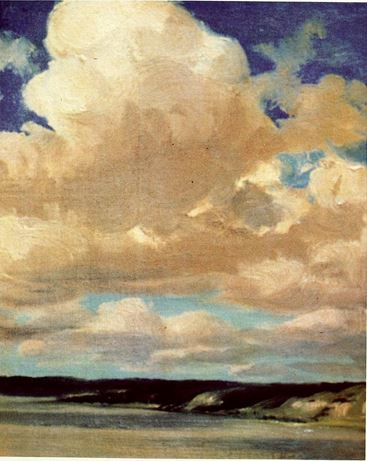
Elsah, c. 1906

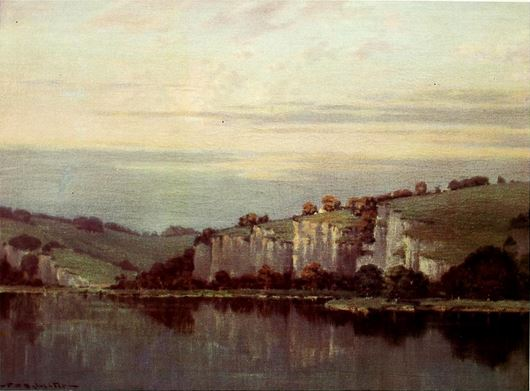
Soft Twilight Lingers, c. 1906

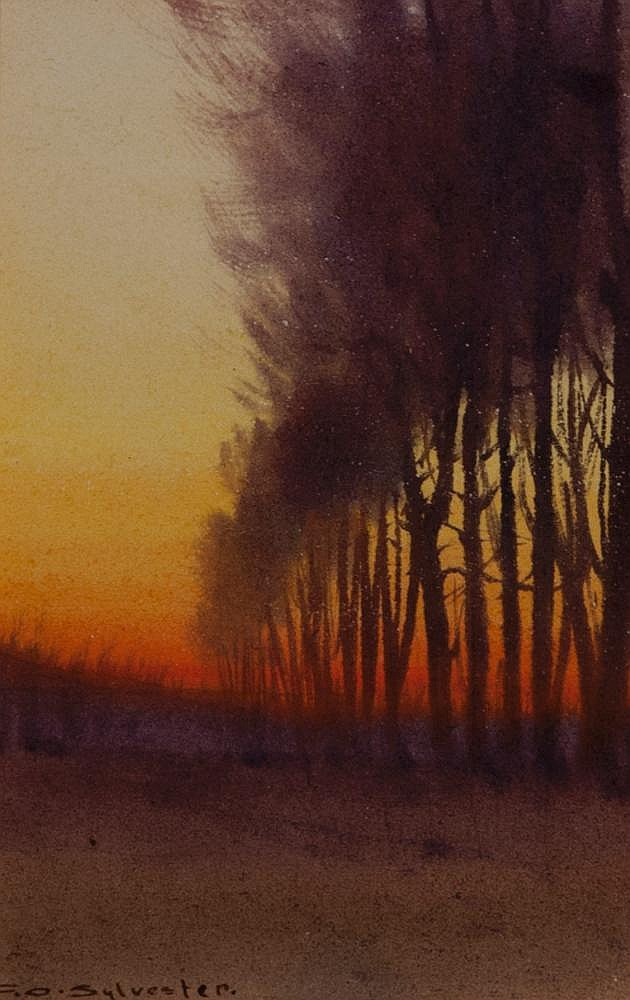
Sunrise through the Trees

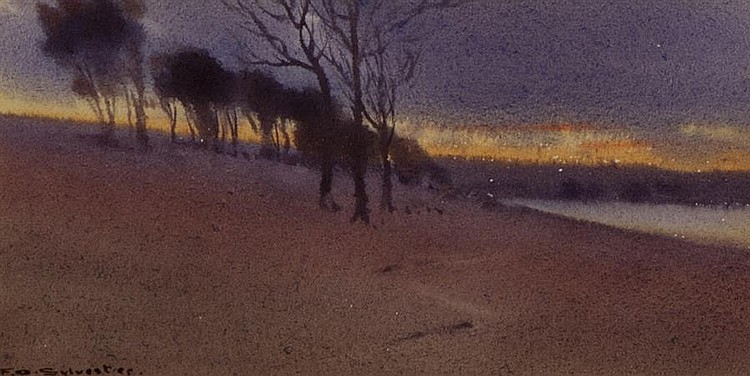
Cloudy Day

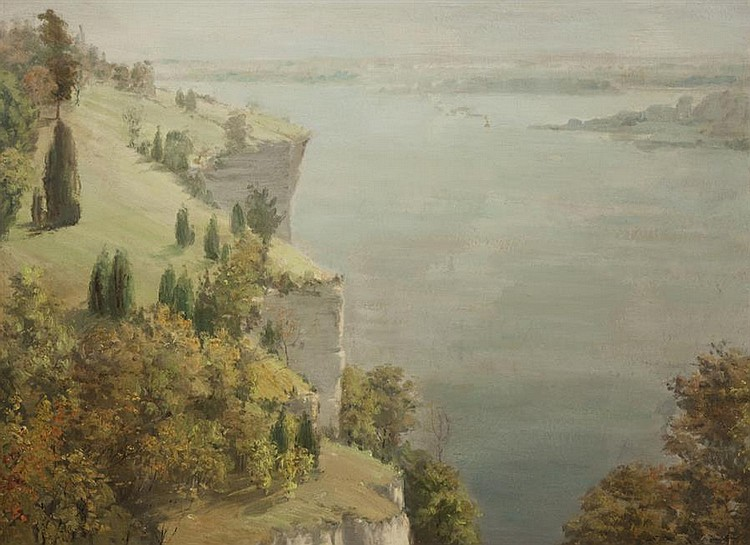
Bluffs along the Mississippi River

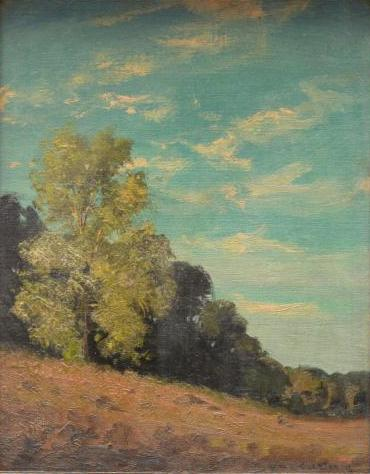
The Sunlit Cottenwood

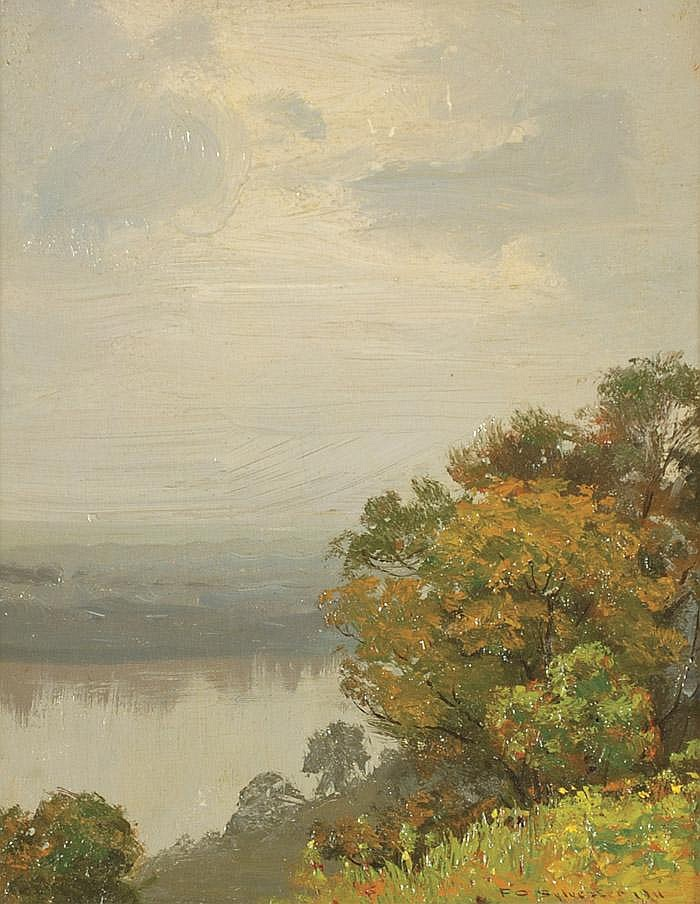
Tonalist River Landscape

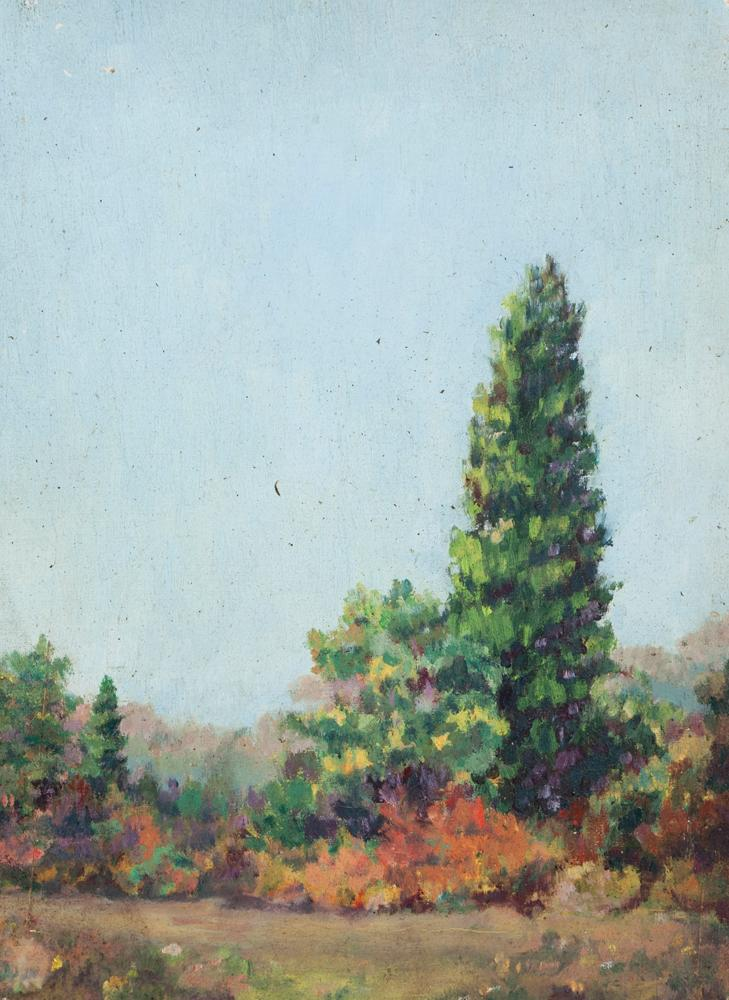
Summer landscape

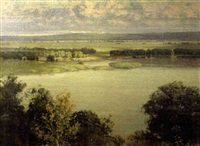
River landscape from the bluffs

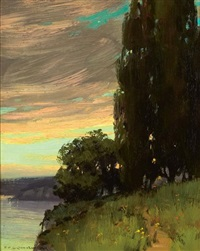
Twilight and evening star

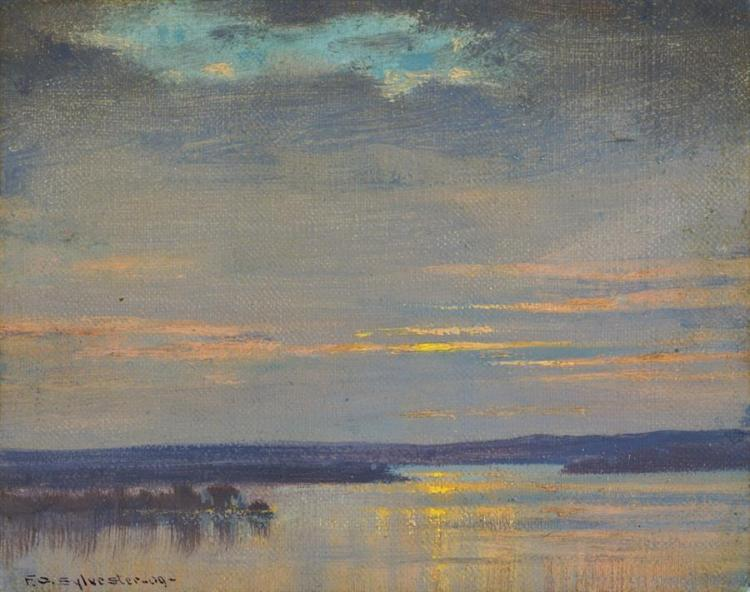
Sunset on the Mississippi, 1909

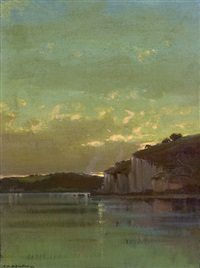
Pageantry of sky and stream, 1909

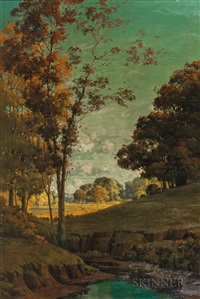
The Light that Makes the Heart Glad, 1910

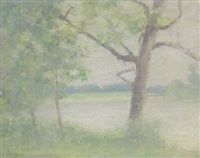
Summer landscape, 1910

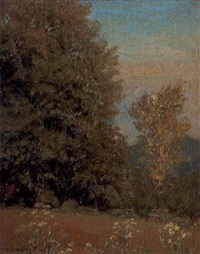
Summer landscape, 1910

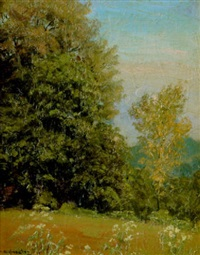
Summer landscape, 1910

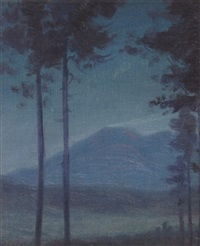
Nocturne, 1910

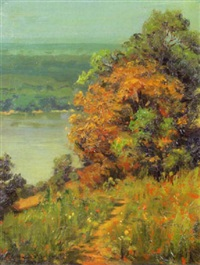
Verdant bluff landscape, 1911

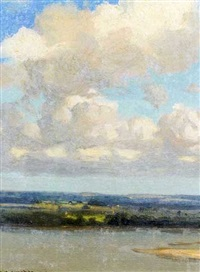
River landscape, 1911

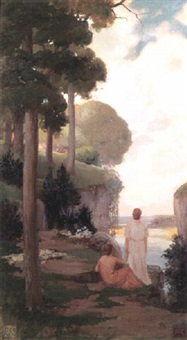
The song of the Mississippi, 1911

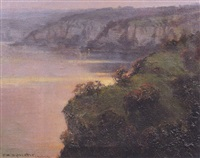
The purple Grafton Heights, 1911–1912

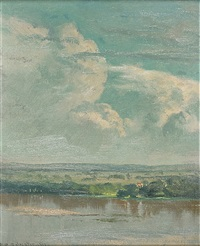
Untitled, 1912

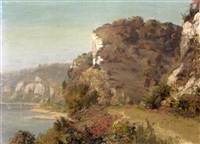
Piasa bluffs on the Mississippi, 1912

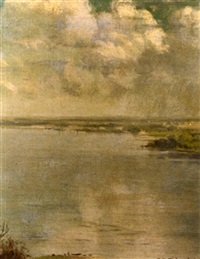
Dreaming, 1913

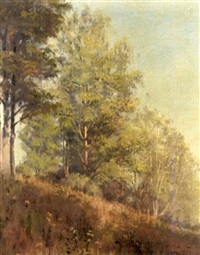
Trees a' shimmer, 1913
