= Richard Ralph (politician) =

American politician

Richard F. Ralph

Member of the Missouri Senate from the 25th district
- In office 1920–?

Personal details
- Born: August 31, 1869 New Boston, New Hampshire
- Died: October 2, 1949 (aged 80) Valley Park, Missouri
- Party: Republican
- Spouse: Ethel M. McLain
- Children: unknown
- Occupation: politician, prosecuting attorney, lawyer

Richard F. Ralph (August 31, 1869 - October 2, 1949) was an American politician from Valley Park, Missouri, who served in the Missouri Senate as Republican floor. He was elected as prosecuting attorney for St. Louis County, Missouri in 1914, 1916, and 1918. Ralph was educated in the public schools of Alton, Illinois, and the Benton College of Law in St. Louis.
