= Caroline G. Thummel =

American woman lawyer

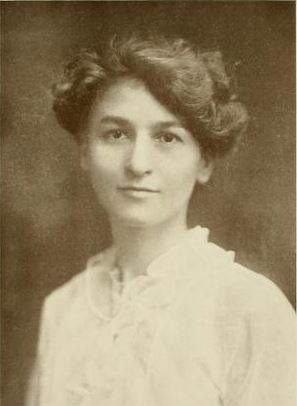
- Born: 1873; Phelps County, Missouri, U.S.
- Died: November 14,1947 (aged 73–74); St. Louis, Missouri, U.S.
- Burial place: Oak Grove Baptist Cemetery, Bridgeport, Missouri
- Other names: Caroline G. Thummel McCarthy
- Education: St. Louis High School and Teachers' College, Benton Law School
- Occupation: lawyer
- Known for: only one of two women lawyers in Western United States in 1910s
- Spouse: William Clark McCarthy (died 1931)
- Children: two daughters

Caroline G. Thummel McCarthy (1873 – November 14, 1947) and Adelaide O'Brien were the only law partnership of women practicing in the Western United States in the 1910s.

== Early life ==
Thummel was born in 1873 in Phelps County, Missouri. The family moved to St. Louis, Missouri while she was an infant. Her father died while she was very young. Her mother Mary L. Gilliam, of Richmond, Virginia, and her father was Gerhardt von Thummel. She had one brother, William von Thummel, who was a civil engineer.

She graduated from St. Louis High School and Teachers' College and then attended and graduated from Benton Law School, during the period when George L. Corlis was dean.

== Career ==
"Woman should make man's proposals easy, but shouldn't draw him out."

— Caroline G. Thummel

She taught school while attending Benton Law School for four years and was admitted to the bar in 1908. She was admitted to Federal practice in September 1910.

In 1910 she made the news with her statement that if women had equal opportunities with man in the industrial world, they would have a larger circle from which to choose a potential husband and would do so with more particularity, in this way decreasing the number of divorces. If instead of teaching the girl to marry at any cost, she were instructed to remain single at any cost until she could marry her mental, moral and physical equal, the census numbers might not mount so high, but the quality of the citizens would more than make up for any lack in quantity.

"Ignorance is woman's handicap."

— Caroline G. Thummel

At the beginning of her career in 1911 she declared "I want to be a help to widows and orphans and women whose education prevents them fighting their own battles."

In 1912, in occasion of the visit of Sylvia Pankhurst to St. Louis, she agreed with Pankhurst's position of wanting women to act on jury cases: "I agree with Miss Pankhurst a jury composed of an equal number of men and women would be the most just jury. I think a jury composed of men alone in trying a woman is liable to lean to the side of gallantry. I think the placing of an equal number of men and women on a jury would eliminate the natural chivalry existing between sex."

"Murders, assaults and other deeds coming under the head of crimes against the person can not be atoned for by prison sentences."

— Caroline G. Thummel

In an address before the Woman's State Bar Association, Thummel stated that "for persons who had committed crimes by destroying property, and those who had committed crimes against other persons, a similar sentence was unjust." It was her aim to establish as near as possible a law that was for the humane interest of human beings, and in 1912 she framed a "Humane Bill", which revoluzionized the Criminal Code and which she presented to the Legislature. Thummel based her bill on facts derived from close contact with the law, saying the law did not provide adequately for certain offenses. "According to the present criminal laws, crimes against persons and crimes against property are largely classed together, and are subject to the same punishment. Those who commit crimes against property can make restitution — money repaid and property restored. Crimes such as murder, assault and other crimes against the person can not be atoned for, and persons committing such crimes are so abnormal that they should be segregated and forever kept from repeating the offense. It is beyond the law to provide adequate remedy for personal injury or loss of life through crimes of another. When one man or corporation has a person punished by law for defrauding, or for deliberately stealing, they simply get revenge. The money or goods are not restored, and, so far as the man or corporation is concerned, he has gained nothing. It is claimed society is improved by the deterrent effect; but society can be improved only by improving the character of the individual. Incarceration has utterly failed to achieve the result. The effect of our criminal law upon the character of those who have paid the penalty is so exactly opposite from that designed by the law that ex-convicts are always under police espionage and are objects of suspicion immediately upon the commission of every new crime. There is no justice in the present penalties. Many guilty persons are freed through technicality. A certain man is serving a sentence for six months for stealing twenty-five cents, while another is serving the same sentence for stealing three thousand times as much. Each man should have been made to earn and repay exactly what he stole, with interest, and to pay the costs; then he should be allowed to go free. Present laws are more likely to make anarchists than anything else.

"Missouri must awaken to a stronger sense of duty if she would rank in the world as a State with correct laws."

— Caroline G. Thummel

"We should take cognizance of the fact that criminals are sick mentally and are morally depraved, and that whether the criminal tendency is the result of heredity and environment, the law should seek a remedy for the ailment. Its aim should be to cure the disease. Confinement and notoriety under unhealthy conditions is the best that is done for a person within the custody of the law. His failings are exposed to the world, his delinquencies are advertised, and thus a hatred for his countrymen and his country are fostered. He is humiliated, scorned and punished, but he is never compelled to rectify the wrong he has done. The chief end and aim of all laws should be to make better citizens. In all cases of oflfense where the wrong suffered can be reduced to a money value; that is, in all crimes affecting property, the convicted person should be sentenced to labor at the regular wage rate until he has earned a sufTicient sum to reimburse his victim and pay the costs. Under the present criminal laws, when the prison door swings open to discharge a prisoner who has paid the penalty imposed by law, it is the same thief who leaves as was taken there. Another crime which we do to one guilty of offense is to gauge his sentence by his past life. If the prisoner at the bar has previously committed a crime and atoned for it under the law, he receives a more severe sentence. This is putting him twice in jeopardy for the same offense."

The above ideas were embodied in a bill presented to the Legislature. The bill did not pass but commenting on it, Senator Alroy S. Phillips said: "It is an admirable, wise and humane measure, but our present ideas are not sufficiently advanced to enable the bill to be understood and appreciated." The bill was endorsed by two other women lawyers, Adelaide E. O'Brien and Amabel Anderson Arnold.

"Prisoners are not considered as human and are treated one as badly as the other."

— Caroline G. Thummel

Thummel was very successful in investigations of the treatment given the workhouse prisoners, and was very active and enthusiastic in every reform movement for the benefit of suffering humanity. Thummel lectured before the law class at the City College of Law and Finance; it was the first time in St. Louis that two women, Thummel (for "Commercial Law") and O'Brien (for "Torts"), were appointed lecturers on law before classes composed of both men and women. Because the Missouri Bar Association, composed of men, barred women lawyers from its membership (although the American Bar Association admitted them), nineteen attorneys of the city have organized the "Woman's Bar Association of the City and State; Thummel was president and O'Brien was vice-president." Its educational policy included the further study of Federal, State and Municipal Law. The vice-president, Thummel, was of the opinion that women's clubs and organizations would be spending their time very profitably if they would study law.

On February 11, 1915, the St. Louis Post-Dispatch reported that Caroline Thummel McCarty and her law partner Adelaide O'Brien were the only law partnership of women practicing in the West.

In October 1915, Thummel demanded to be examined for Head of Legal Aid Bureau, a position from which she was excluded due to the fact she was a woman. She lost her suit before Judge Jones who held that the Efficiency Board had the power, under the charter, to enforce rules and regulations governing examinations, so long as it acted within reason.

In 1936 she ran in the Democratic party primary for Prosecuting Attorney of Warren County, Missouri; she lost in the general election to Republican Alvin H. Juërgenmeyer, 1096 to 2801.

She was also an accomplished poet, with several books of poems published. She collaborated with the Warrenton Banner with the column "Masses Creek Observations".

At the time of her death in 1947 she was working for the Masonic Home in St. Louis.

== Personal life ==
Caroline G. Thummel married William Clark McCarthy (1865–1931), an attorney, morning newspaper reporter and a widower with two children, Mrs Norman Conrad and Mary McCarthy. They lived at 1036 Fairmont Ave in Saint Louis and owned a farm near Jonesburg, Missouri, the McCarty Lodge.

She died at the Masonic Home Hospital in St. Louis, Missouri on November 14, 1947, and is buried at Oak Grove Baptist Cemetery, Bridgeport, Missouri, beside her husband.
