= Paul O. Williams =

American writer

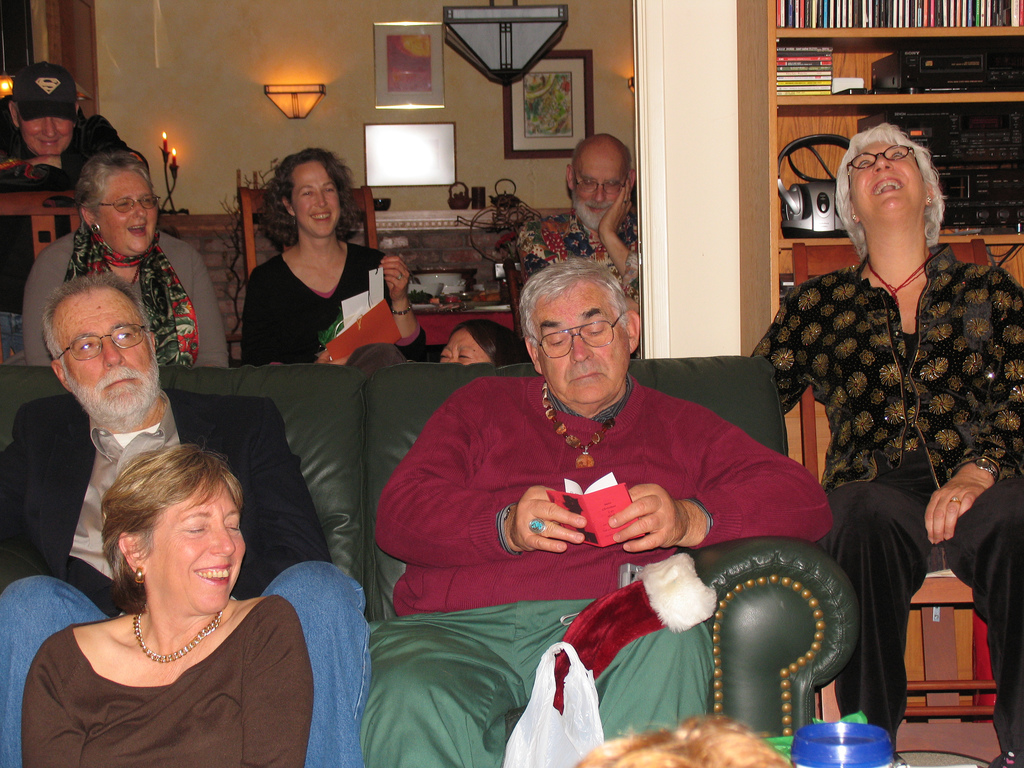
- Williams reading from his book of cat haiku at the Yuki Teikei Holiday Party in 2006
- Born: January 17, 1935
- Died: June 2, 2009 (aged 74)
- Occupation: Writer
- Writing career
- Genre: Science fiction
- Notable awards: John W. Campbell Award for Best New Writer (1983)

Paul O. Williams (January 17, 1935 – June 2, 2009) was an American science fiction writer and haiku poet. Williams won multiple awards including the John W. Campbell Award and the Museum of Haiku Literature Award; and was professor emeritus of English at Principia College in Elsah, Illinois and president of the Haiku Society of America.

== Life ==
His most notable science fiction works are a series of novels, the Pelbar Cycle, set in North America about a thousand years after a "time of fire", in which the world was nearly totally depopulated. The novels track a gradual reconnection of the human cultures which developed. Much of the action takes place in the communities of the Pelbar, along the Upper Mississippi River — in the general vicinity of Elsah. Several cultures, including the matriarchal Pelbar, join in the Heart River Federation. Others, especially the tyrannical Tantal and slave-raiding Tusco, fall apart after suffering defeats. The predominant characters are change agents: Tor, Jestak, Stel and his wife Ahroe Westrun. All are Pelbar except for Tor who is Shumai. Williams won the John W. Campbell Award for Best New Writer in Science Fiction in 1983. Williams was a professor at Duke University and Principia College, and a longtime contributor to The Christian Science Monitor.

He is also known as a writer of haiku, senryū, and tanka, and wrote a number of essays on the haiku form in English. In a 1975 essay, he coined the term "Tontoism" to refer to the practice of writing haiku with missing articles ("the", "a", or "an"), which he claimed made the haiku sound like the stunted English of the Indian sidekick, Tonto, in the Lone Ranger radio and television series. In 2001, his best essays were collected in The Nick of Time: Essays on Haiku Aesthetics, edited by Lee Gurga and Michael Dylan Welch. Williams was the president of the Haiku Society of America (1999) and vice president of the Tanka Society of America (2000). In 1989 he won the Museum of Haiku Literature Award from the Haiku Society of America with this poem written for Nick Virgilio shortly after Nick's death:

gone from the woods
the bird I knew
by song alone

Williams died from an aortic dissection on June 2, 2009.

== Selected works ==
The Pelbar Cycle

- The Breaking of Northwall (1981)
- The Ends of the Circle (1981)
- The Dome in the Forest (1981)
- The Fall of the Shell (1982)
- An Ambush of Shadows (1983)
- Song of the Axe (1984)
- The Sword of Forbearance (1985)

(The Pelbar Cycle was republished in 2005–2006 by the University of Nebraska Press.)

Gorboduc Series

- The Gifts of the Gorboduc Vandal (1989)
- The Man from Far Cloud (2004)

Haiku, senryū, tanka, and other poetry books

- The Edge of the Woods: 55 Haiku (1968; haiku)
- Tracks on the River (1982; haiku)
- Growing in the Rain (1991; longer poetry)
- Outside Robins Sing: Selected Haiku July 1999. Brooks Books 56 pages. ISBN 0-913719-98-6
- The Nick of Time: Essays on Haiku Aesthetics by Paul O. Williams, Press Here, 2001, ISBN 1-878798-23-5 (winner of the Haiku Society of America's 2002 Merit Award for Best Criticism)
- These Audacious Maples (2007; tanka)
- The Day of Strawberries, edited by Paul O. Williams (San Francisco: Two Autumns Press, 2004) — the companion chapbook to the Haiku Poets of Northern California's fifteenth annual Two Autumns poetry reading series
- Paul's Shiki Monthly Kukai Entries

Other published works

- Frederick Oakes Sylvester: the artist's encounter with Elsah (1986, illustrated biography of Frederick Oakes Sylvester)
