= July H. Thomson =

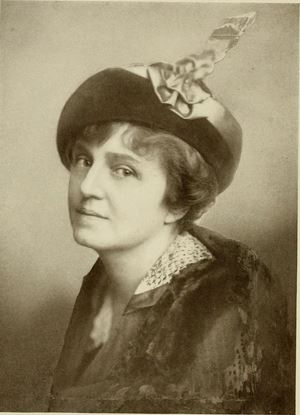
July H. Thomson, Mrs Charles Cummings Collins, Gerhard Sisters Photo

July Hargadine Thomson Collins (December 9, 1872 – October 16, 1929) was the founder and manager of the Night and Day Camp, a St. Louis city camping site for the cure of tuberculosis, which targeted the poor women population of the city.

== Biography ==
July Hargadine Thomson was born on December 9, 1872, the daughter of William Holmes Thomson (1837–1920), vice-president of the Boatmen's Bank and a leader in the St. Louis Veiled Prophet organization, and Anna Lou Hargadine (1851–1934). In 1895 she married Charles Cummings Collins (1872-1922), an attorney. Her children were Anne Collins Taussig (1896–1951), July Comfort Collins Anderson (1897–1929), Mary Virginia Collins Glogau (1903–1978) and Elizabeth Cummings Collins.

July H. Thomson became interested in the charity work in 1911 and began energetically raising all the money necessary to erect and equip a Night and Day Camp for poor girls of St. Louis who were threatened with tuberculosis. Since the opening of the camp, she has been in active charge of it and has spent much of her time conducting business at that institution. This camp was located at 9500 South Broadway, in a large oak grove, overlooking the Mississippi River. It was opened on March 19, 1913. The capacity was for twenty-eight girls. It was conducted as a preventorium against tuberculosis for self-sustaining girls and women. More than fifty girls, from department stores and factories, were admitted. Over thirty were discharged as practically cured. Dozens of women, ill but compelled to earn a living, received the best medical and nursing care and got the much-needed proper nourishment and complete rest during their "off-duty hours."

While the camp was primarily established to prevent the disease, it accomplished more. With the restful surroundings and good influence, the entire viewpoint toward life of the patient frequently changed. Melancholy was lost, ambition was aroused, nerves were quieted, and the spirit of unselfishness grew. It was the only one in the United States that was exclusively for women. The patients took absolute rest for three weeks, then, if able to resume their work, returned to the camp each night, until thoroughly rehabilitated. The treatment was free of any expense, except for the car fare to and from the camp. The ground was first broken for the building on August 31, 1912. The first patient was admitted on March 19, 1913. The total construction cost was $6,231.80 ($203,006 in 2025 dollars). The capacity is only twenty-eight. The number of patients admitted in the first year was fifty-two, and the number discharged was thirty. The greatest gain in weight in the shortest time (three months) was fourteen pounds. All expenses considered, the cost of each patient per month was $24.90 ($811 in 2025 dollars), and per day, covering six meals, was 83 cents ($27 in 2025 dollars); the cost for night patients was 55 cents ($18 in 2025 dollars). It cared for working girls who contracted the disease in its incipient stages, and by giving them plenty of good, fresh air and a healthy diet of eggs and milk, enabled them to throw off the disease. To let people die from tuberculosis was a crime, when, for a little money, those who developed the early stages could be entirely cured. While the movement for the Night and Day Camp was sponsored by the St. Louis Society for the Relief and Prevention of Tuberculosis, under the immediate direction of Collins, the society was never called upon for financial assistance or support.

In conjunction with The St. Louis Times, Collins personally solicited numerous cash contributions, directed charity balls, and raised hundreds of dollars in a dime-and-quarter campaign in the St. Louis wholesale, retail and business establishments. The proceeds from these and other sources went towards the construction of the camp, its equipment and maintenance. Helen Gould also sent a very liberal donation, set aside as a nest-egg toward an endowment fund.

The fact which made the camp possible was the land gift from the Laclede Gas Light Company. There were four acres of land with the house almost squarely in the middle. It was a short distance from the Broadway car line, consisting of an administration building, built in a bungalow type, with two dormitories — one extending winglike from either side, and a kitchen in the rear. The dormitories were constructed with a wooden base and screened walls. Along either side was a row of compartments, each with two beds. The patients were sleeping in the open but were under a comfortable shelter. The front lawn was used for the recreation grounds — it was strewn with steamer chairs, hammocks swinging from many trees, and several croquet sets — this being the least strenuous form of recreation for girls in their condition. There were also chicken yards, gardens, and dove cotes, where the girls could raise their vegetables, poultry and squabs, all of which went to supply the camp's table. They had a piano, mandolins, and graphophones to amuse them. Most of the time, the girls spent out in the open.

The rising bell, at 7:30 a. m., with breakfast at 8:00, was the beginning of camp rules. After that was feeding the chickens, working in the gardens, but for the most part, resting and eating — six times a day did these girls eat. The food given them was of the most nourishing variety, in the way of soups, meats, poultry, milk and eggs; ice cream was one of the favorite desserts. Men were tabooed, not even a janitor was employed on the grounds. The patients were of all ages over fifteen. There were school teachers, newspaper writers, trained nurses, stenographers, factory workers and shopgirls — more of the two latter occupations. As soon as the girls or women entered this home they were impressed with the fact that they were not hopelessly ill, and with proper rest and diet could recover. The girl whose constitution was undermined with too much work must first build up her health in order to fight off the disease. Rose Ryffle was a nurse, a graduate of the Baptist Sanitarium, and under her direction. Medical attention was furnished by Dr. Walter Fischel and his staff.

In nearly every instance, the girls who left the camp as cured returned to employments that brought them better wages than those they received when they were forced to drop their work and go to the camp for restoration. Some girls who went there could not relinquish their work; the money they received in wages was required in their home life. But even this did not prevent them from receiving the benefits of the camp. At the end of their day's work, they returned to receive their supper, lunch at nine, sleeping accommodations, and breakfast. This costs the camp fifty-five cents. Briefly, it was possible for a rundown, susceptible or affected girl to continue her self-supporting employment and still receive care, attention and cure in the camp. This treatment was such that recently a girl gained eight pounds in a single week. In one instance, a girl badly in need of such care and who could not sacrifice her wages of four dollars a week was taken in, and her mother was given the four dollars until she could go out and retake her position. Many cases like this were cared for.

The pupils of Lenox Hall raised enough money to purchase furniture for one room, and since then, they have maintained two beds. They formally dedicated the room, and a brass plate was on the door.

Collins founded this camp and established a program for the girls who participated in the movement.

During the winter of 1917–1918, Collins founded the "Y" Canteen Union Station, which fed 131,584 soldiers returning from World War I. It was sponsored by the Young Women's Christian Association and employed 210 volunteers. According to John R. Mott, national head of the Y.M.C.A., it was "the greatest canteen in the United States; the greatest in the world after that at Bordeaux, France".

She died on October 16, 1929, and is buried at Bellefontaine Cemetery.
