= Myles P. Dyer =

American politician

Myles P. Dyer (August 3, 1887 – September 1, 1969) was an American Democratic politician who served in the Missouri General Assembly. He served in the Missouri Senate from 1939 until 1943. Born in Cleveland, Ohio, Dyer was educated in parochial and public schools and at Benton College of Law in St. Louis, Missouri.
