= W. J. Doran =

Missouri politician

William J. Doran

Member of the Missouri Senate from the 29th district
- In office 1932–1944

Personal details
- Born: May 30, 1886 St. Louis, Missouri, US
- Died: February 28, 1949 (aged 62)
- Party: Democratic
- Spouses: Ella Nutt Doran; Elizabeth Bryan Smart
- Children: 6

William J. Doran (May 30, 1886 – February 28, 1949) was an American politician from St. Louis who served in the Missouri Senate from 1932–1944. He was the first Democratic senator to be elected to his district in 40 years. Doran was educated in public schools and the Benton College of Law in St. Louis. His name appears in a 1917 copy of "The Contractor", in which he is associated with the Skrainka Construction Company.
