= Bridgeport, Missouri =

Unincorporated community in the US state of Missouri

Coordinates: 38.743656°N 91.3998834°W

Bridgeport is an unincorporated community in Warren County, in the U.S. state of Missouri.

== History ==
The first settlement at Bridgeport was made before 1810. The Bridgeport post office closed in 1893.
