= Lucille Erskine =

American writer, educator, and press agent

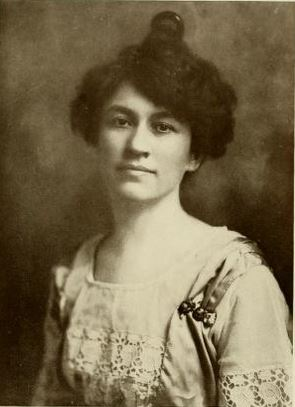
Lucille Erskine, Kajiwara Photo

Lucille Erskine (born January 6, 1879 in St. Louis, Missouri) was an American writer, educator and Hollywood press agent.

== Biography ==
Lucille Erskine was born in St. Louis in 1879, the daughter of Samuel Erskine, Esq., a lawyer and famous orator, prosecutor attorney in St. Louis, and Marie Erskine-Robinson. Samuel Erskine addressed large audiences at Cooper's Union, New York, on the Irish questions. He was a son of Stuart Erskine, of Edinburgh, attended Beloit College, Wisconsin, and taught English at night in the German Institute of St. Louis before studying law, and later was called upon for the important work of revising its charter. He died at the early age of 42 years when Lucille Erskine was four years old. Her mother later remarried and became a teacher at the Bellefontaine Farms.

Erskine's literary education, in particular, was undertaken by her mother. Erskine graduated from Washington University in St. Louis in 1901, summa cum laude.

Erskine taught at the Irving School in St. Louis in 1902 and the following year she joined the Central High School. In 1903 the summer was spent in New England, visiting the homes and places associated with Hawthorne, Emerson and Washington Irving. The summers of 1904 and 1905 were passed in the University of Chicago in post-graduate work in English. In 1907 she received a degree as Master of Arts from Washington University. Her thesis on Edgar Allan Poe as a critic was published in The St. Louis Mirror, and quoted in Current Literature, New York, on the poet's centenary.

Erskine travelled several successive summers in Europe doing foreign correspondence for St. Louis newspapers and the New York World. One entire summer she lived in Dublin writing weekly letters on The New Ireland. In 1909 her first story was published in The St. Louis Mirror, and commented on by the New York Dramatic Mirror; they said it was a tale of surpassing art. The story was entitled The Crystal.

In 1911 she went to New York to do syndicate journalistic work for the Publishers' Press syndicate. This consisted mostly of interviews with women in new lines of endeavor which were published in papers throughout the country. She also contributed to the New York World, The Times, and the Theatre Magazine, her sketches of some of the leading women being most unusual, because of their brilliant style of delineation. However, she preferred to give up this work when she realized that she could never make it commercial and she devoted herself for six months to writing The Crossbreed; or. An Irish Story.

Erskine returned to teaching in 1913 as instructor of Latin and English literature in the Central High School. She previously taught at the McKinley High School for several years.

In the 1920s she moved to Hollywood to work as screenwriter. In the late 1920s she was working as press-agent. In 1929 she was the public representative of Jack Cunningham.

In the 1940s census she was living in Los Angeles, as a lodger of Florence McCleary, with McCleary's mother, Anna Reynolds, and children, William G. McCleary and Rose Anne McCleary. Other lodgers include: Juanita Hicks, Yvonne Minnette, Anne L. Fritz and Thelma Lang.
