= Helen R. Rathbun =

American painter

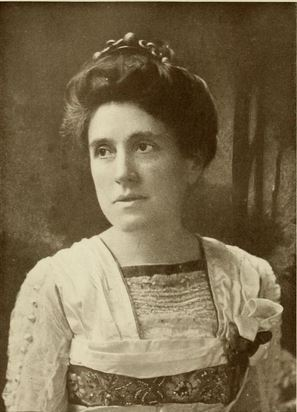
Helen R. Rathbun, Kajiwara Photo

Helen Rhind Rathbun Bissell (July 1, 1870 – November 9, 1944) was a St. Louis artist, one of the strongest landscape painters. Her work, considered almost masculine in its strength, possessed much of that swing and vigor which put the work of Cecilia Beaux and Mary Cassatt in the first rank of American painters.

== Biography ==
Helen Rhind Rathbun was born in Petaluma, California on July 1, 1870, the daughter of Edwin Rathbun and Katherine Donaldson. While in the Normal School, from which she was graduated, Helen R. Rathbun showed such decided talent that Frederick O. Sylvester, her instructor, urged her to devote her undivided time to this branch of art. A short course in the St. Louis School of Fine Arts was of much value, but she then mainly trained under Edgar J. Bissell (1861-1928), and later married him.

Helen R. Rathbun worked in water colors and oil and children were her favorite subjects, although interior scenes were also handled with superior skill, and outdoor studies, landscapes and street scenes showed an effort to realize the light and air which nature surrounded and spread over all of her works, a constant cry for light and always more light.

The Distant Hills was a scientific study of color and a feeling for the dramatic, common in all of her work — swiftly moving clouds, flowing water, the glitter of sunshine, the action and movement that nature gives to her mise en scene. Another quality she got in her later work was that the picture seemed larger than the canvas — larger than it really was. The clouds seemed to continue higher, the landscape to spread out broader, and this was unconscious on the artist's part, she just felt and got it.

In speaking of Rathbun's pictures, Edgar Bissell, a portrait painter, said, "Miss Rathbun just seems to paint from knowledge — just sits down anywhere and paints a picture without looking around for 'compositions." Describing one called And the Flood, it was just the brimming river spreading over everything — water everywhere — in the masses of clouds hanging heavily above — technically — just values and color and handling and the elimination of unnecessary things from the composition. One large painting, The Broken Toy, was a bit of child nature — the little man who seeks the source of sympathy, the eternal feminine where all troubles are brought and from the artistic side it is a very successful effort to show the spread of the sunshine thrown over the scene — children, lawn, trees.

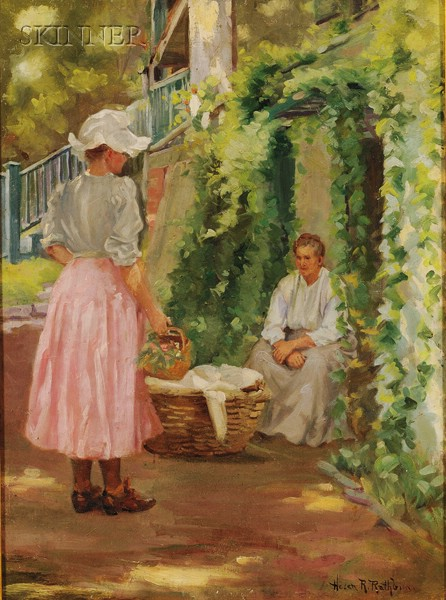
Helen R. Rathbun, In the Garden

Mother Love was another good picture, a good rendering of color and textures, the way forms disappear and the mysteries of the shadows. Boy Fishing was another attractive picture. A boy with a short stick with a bent pin tied to a string angling for a fish that never bites, and that is somewhat like the artistic profession — a paint box and some brushes and a hard-hearted public.

In her old-fashioned home, brought up by her aunties since she was nine years old, Rathbun spent her life; the antique furnishings and quaint surroundings developed in her such a love of this atmosphere that many of her pictures show the influence — the peace, placidity and harmony in her interior subjects rests one to look at them. One particular picture made from a corner of the living room shows a little maid sitting contentedly in an old-fashioned armchair near a table of polished mahogany of an early period, a sconce on the wall and an open door showing the furnishings of the next room in perfect harmony. This was a treasure — there was such an air of cheerful comfort that one longs to creep into the picture and be a part of it.

In 1908 she exhibited with Martha Hoke and Cornelia Maury at the St. Louis gallery at 10 South Broadway. In 1911 she exhibited at the Dietrich Gallery. In 1915 she exhibited two paintings in the Panama Pacific International Exposition.

Many of her pictures gained honors as well as prizes. In 1909 she was awarded the first prize at the woman's exhibit of the Artists' Guild. This was An Autumn Landscape. The next year she captured a prize in the same exhibition. She has also exhibited in the Eastern art galleries.

In 1928 she made the news when she was swindled out of a diamond ring value $1,000 ($18,750 in 2025 dollars).

She married Edgar J. Bissell in 1914, and had one son, William Edgar John Bissell (1916–1945), who committed suicide. She lived at 3016 Bartold Avenue, St. Louis, and died on November 9, 1944, in Maplewood, Missouri. She is buried at Bellefontaine Cemetery, St. Louis.

== Gallery ==
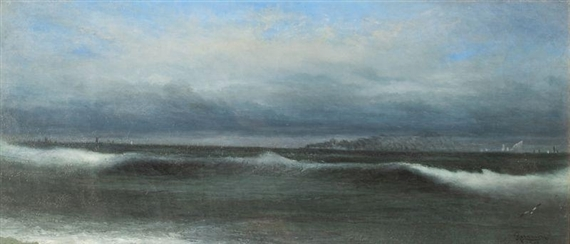
Seascape, 1901
