= Amabel Anderson Arnold =

American lawyer (1883–1936)

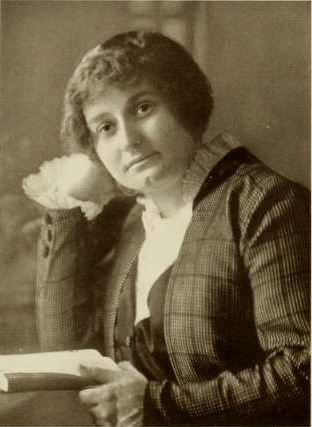
- Miss Amabel Anderson, Photo from Notable Women of St. Louis, 1914, credited to Gerhard Sisters
- Born: May 31, 1883; Chatham, Ontario, Canada
- Died: February 18, 1936 (aged 52)
- Burial place: Graceland Cemetery, Chicago, Illinois, US
- Education: Ferris Normal School; City College of Law and Financ; Benton College of Law
- Occupations: Lawyer and law professor
- Employer(s): Arnold Preparatory School, Saint Louis University, American Medical College, University of Chicago Law School, City College of Law and Finance
- Organization(s): Women's National College Club, Woman's State Bar Association of Missouri, Equal Suffrage League (St. Louis)

Amabel Anderson Arnold LL.M. (May 31, 1883 – February 18, 1936) was an American lawyer and law professor who organized the Woman's State Bar Association of Missouri, the first association of women lawyers in the world.

== Early life ==
Amabel Anderson was born in Chatham, Ontario, on May 31, 1883. Her father was a natural-born United States citizen and her mother belonged to the Burgess family, of English ancestry, known among the most progressive people of Yarmouth, Nova Scotia - well educated, prosperous and of sterling quality. She had one brother, Charles.

The Andersons moved to London, Ontario where Anderson attended her first two years of primary education. Summers and the Christmas seasons were spent at their mother's old home near Aylmer, Ontario. Later the family moved to Michigan, where public school wasn't as progressive as it had been in Canada. Anderson managed to pass her high school entrance examination thanks to the private tutoring of a retired teacher she called "School Madam".

Anderson entered high school at 12 years old at the third district school in Tuscola County, Michigan. The Anderson family had to move again when Anderson's father was transferred to Bay City, Michigan, where Anderson spent the years between 14 and 20; at this time, attending high school, she studied music and sketching. Without completing high school, at 16, she started to teach in the lower grades and at the same time she was actively engaged in church and club work, on several occasions organizing and promoting literary and physical culture clubs.

The chance to attend a course at Ferris Normal School, pushed her to complete her high-school course. She continued to attend the Ferris Normal School, and became the principal of a ten-grade school. She continued to teach and study, and completed the normal course and also a course in painting.

After some years spent as a teacher, in 1910 Anderson entered the City College of Law and Finance, attending the night courses. While attending the college, she was the only woman student in her class. She successfully completed three years of law school, two of courses and one of lectures. The fourth year, the work field, she enrolled at Benton College of Law, again the only woman. Having attended two law schools, she graduated from both: she received an LL.M. degree from Benton College of Law on June 6, 1912, and a LL.B. from City College of Law and Finance on June 11, 1912.

== Career ==
In 1907 Anderson moved to St. Louis where she opened and managed the Arnold Preparatory School in the Benoist Building. They enrolled many men, and some women, whose early education had been neglected. Anderson and her assistants tutored them privately and placed them in nearly every department of every college and university in St. Louis and in other cities.

In 1908, while operating her own school, Anderson also accepted a position as instructor of Latin in the Dental Department of the Saint Louis University, the only woman in the faculty. She was also professor of medical botany at the American Medical College, again the only woman instructor.

In 1912, Anderson organized the Women's National College Club, with headquarters in St. Louis, serving as its national president. Her idea was to expanding her school work and prepare to merge her preparatory school to some larger institution.

On July 15, 1912, Anderson was among the St. Louis women attorneys who organized the Woman's State Bar Association of Missouri, the first association of women lawyers in the world. Caroline G. Thummel was the President.

In September 1913, Anderson was elected director of the Woman's Department at the University of Chicago Law School, the first woman holding such office in the United States.

In 1914, Anderson was appointed on the regular faculty of the City College of Law and Finance as lecturer and instructor in the chair of International Law, again, the only woman holding such a position in St. Louis.

Anderson was an advocate of the Equal Rights Amendment and Women's suffrage in the United States. She was a charter member of the Equal Suffrage League (St. Louis), and sent out the first invitations to business women, asking them to meet to consider the organization of a league to further suffrage.

== Personal life and death ==
Anderson married W. E. Arnold, a medical student at the American Medical College. They divorced December 2, 1912, and she went back to use her maiden name.

Anderson is buried at Graceland Cemetery, Chicago.
