= Frances Cushman Wines =

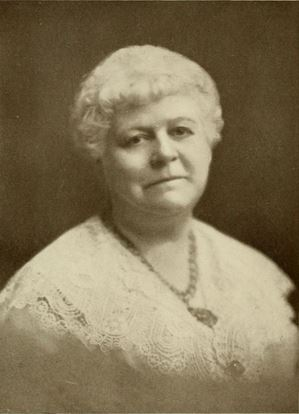
Frances Cushman-Wines, Gerhard Sisters Photo

Frances Cushman Wines (May 9, 1852 - August 26, 1928) was the only woman who was a member of the St. Louis Real Estate Exchange at her time.

== Biography ==
Frances Cushman was born on May 9, 1852, in the historical town of New Lisbon, Ohio, where her maternal great-grandfather, a Revolutionary soldier, and her grandfather, who fought in the War of 1812, settled in 1803. There her father, Dr. Sylvanus D. Cushman (1819–1908), a noted inventor, married Elmira Shawke (1822–1877). Frances Cushman was also married in New Lisbon. Dr. Sylvanus Cushman was a descendant of Thomas Cushman and Mary Allerton, a daughter of Isaac Allerton. The charter made between King James, represented by the Right Hon. Edmond Lord Sheffield, and Robert Cushman and Edward Winslow for themselves and their associates, gave Puritans a right to use certain lands. The first sermon ever preached on New England ground was by Robert Cushman, December 12, 1621, at "The Common House" of the colony on Leyden Street at Plymouth. There is a monument in the Plymouth Cemetery to his memory, and the copy of the sermon and the charter are justly prized by all Cushman descendants.

Wines resided in Detroit, Chicago and Cleveland before moving to St. Louis in 1896. It was then she took up the real estate business. Having been an invalid for a number of years, she was advised to interest herself in open-air work, and be relieved of the care of a home, especially as she had no children. She went to Fredericks to place her house on sale and he found from her conversation that she understood many things about houses in the way of conveniences, decorations, etc., and proposed that she took up work of that nature. She did so and restored to health, had an object in life outside of the ordinary duties of "nursing furniture," etc., and kept herself interested in things worth while, as well as the satisfaction of being able to guide young people and often older ones in doing what was best for themselves and their families.

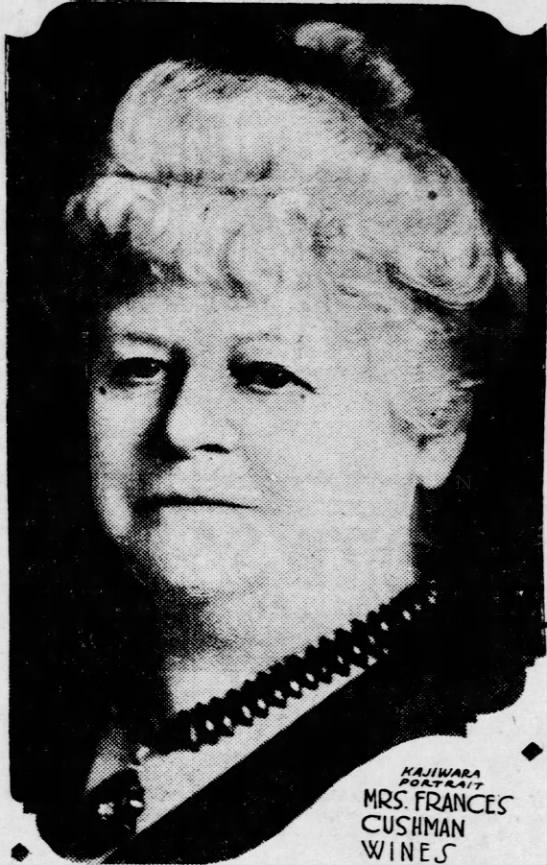
Frances Cushman-Wines

Frances Cushman-Wines was in the real estate business, the only woman who was a member of the St. Louis Real Estate Exchange. Beginning in the office of A. H. Fredericks, she gained in the year she remained with him much practical information and a good training for a successful business career. For the next ten years she was connected with the firm of A. A. Fischer Real Estate Company. Fischer was a builder, and constructed his own houses. He sold, while Wines was associated with him, one thousand homes, and she stated that in all the contracts made not one out of that number was foreclosed by a mortgage. The houses were represented as they really were — the best for the money. She used her good judgment in many ways and principally in never trying to make a sale to parties beyond what she knew they could afford to buy.

Her special work was decorating homes. When possible buyers for a new house were found she visited their old homes, got their ideas as to furnishings, etc., and then tried to match the decorations in the house which she wished to sell them both to their taste and means, and in this way rarely ever failed to make a sale. She assisted in designing and decorating homes in Portland, Westmoreland and Parkview Places, as well as other desirable residence portions of St. Louis.

While with Fischer, Wines acted as his sole agent. She later conducted a general real estate business of her own, being located in the office with A. H. Fredericks.

She built for herself a small home, at 6179 Westminster Place, St. Louis, which she considered a model in every way. She had no family except her husband, Abner Gore Wines (1850–1916), who was with the American Type Foundry Company. One son, Earl C. Wines (1882–1883), died an infant.

She had an interest in collecting rare stones. In her traveling she kept an eye open for gems out of the usual, and consequently possessed many specimens, in cut, size, history, visuals and value. The gems in her gowns were matched in order to create visual harmony.

She died on August 26, 1928, and is buried at Lisbon Cemetery, Lisbon.
