= George Swede =

Canadian writer

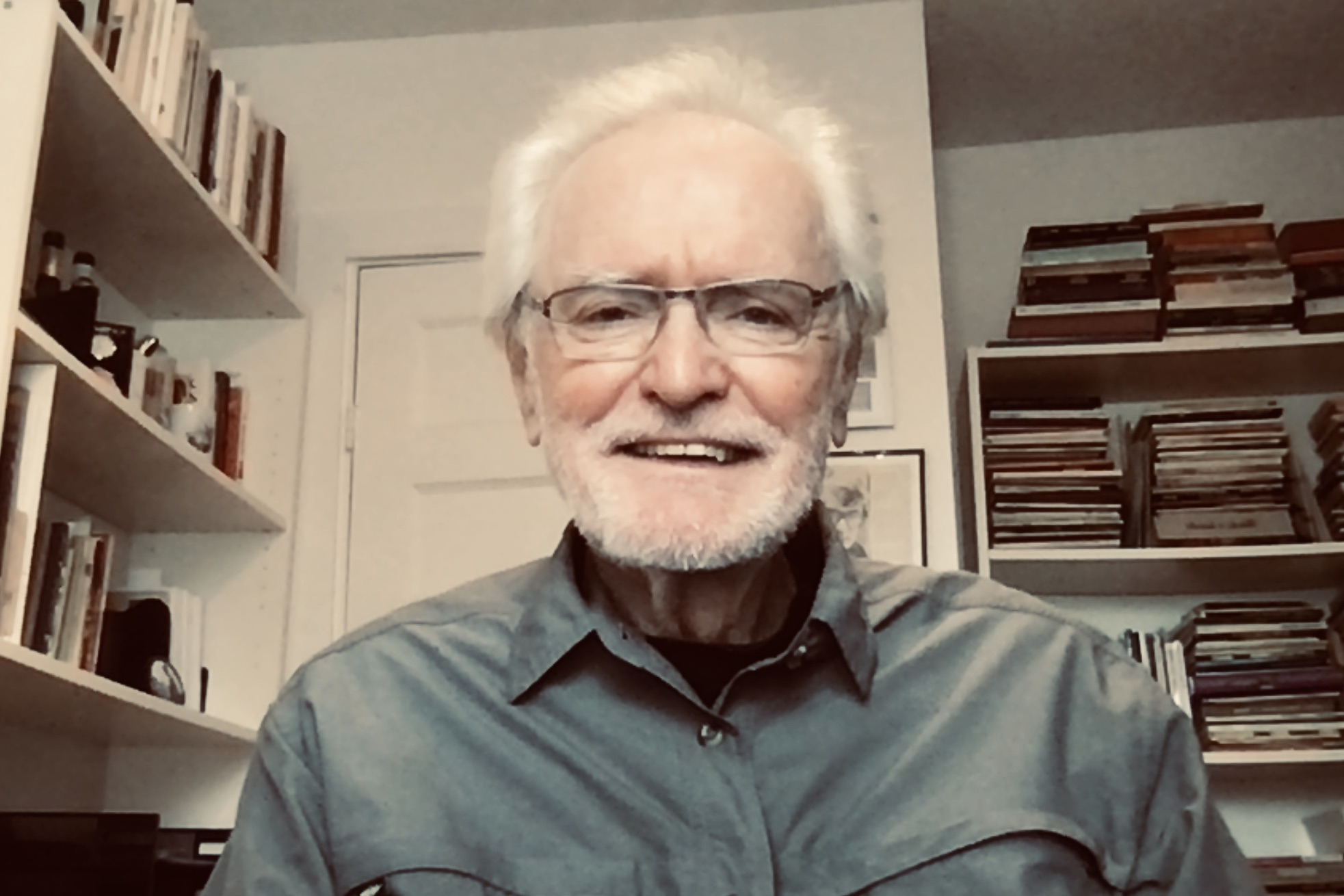
George Swede in 2025

George Swede (Latvian: Juris Švēde, born as Juris Puriņš, November 20, 1940 in Riga, Latvia) is a Latvian Canadian psychologist, poet and children's writer who lives in Toronto, Ontario. He is a major figure in English-language haiku, known for his wry, poignant observations.

== Life ==
In 1947, Swede arrived with his mother and stepfather from post-WW II Europe to live with his maternal grandparents on a fruit farm in Oyama, British Columbia. When his stepfather died in 1950, Swede moved with his mother to Vancouver, where he finished junior high and high school. Then he studied at the University of British Columbia, where he graduated with a B.A. in Psychology in 1964. After that, he worked briefly as a psychologist at B.C. Penitentiary in New Westminster. In 1965, he earned an M.A. at Dalhousie University with a published thesis.

From 1966 to 1967, Swede was a psychology instructor at Vancouver City College, after which he worked as a school psychologist at the Scarborough Board of Education in Toronto until 1968.

He resumed his academic career at Ryerson University, where he stayed as member of the psychology department from 1968 to 2006 (as chair from 1998 to 2003). From 1970 to 1975 he served as Director for Developmental Psychology at Ryerson Open College, a virtual university which broadcast lectures by radio (on CJRT-FM) and TV (CBC and CTV) from 1970 to 1975; and from 1993 to 2000 he was engaged in Ryerson University Now (RUN), an initiative to get bright but disadvantaged students interested in going to university. This was achieved by enrolling Vaughan Road Academy students in a university level introductory psychology course that Swede taught. Most graduated, and many received scholarships to attend university.

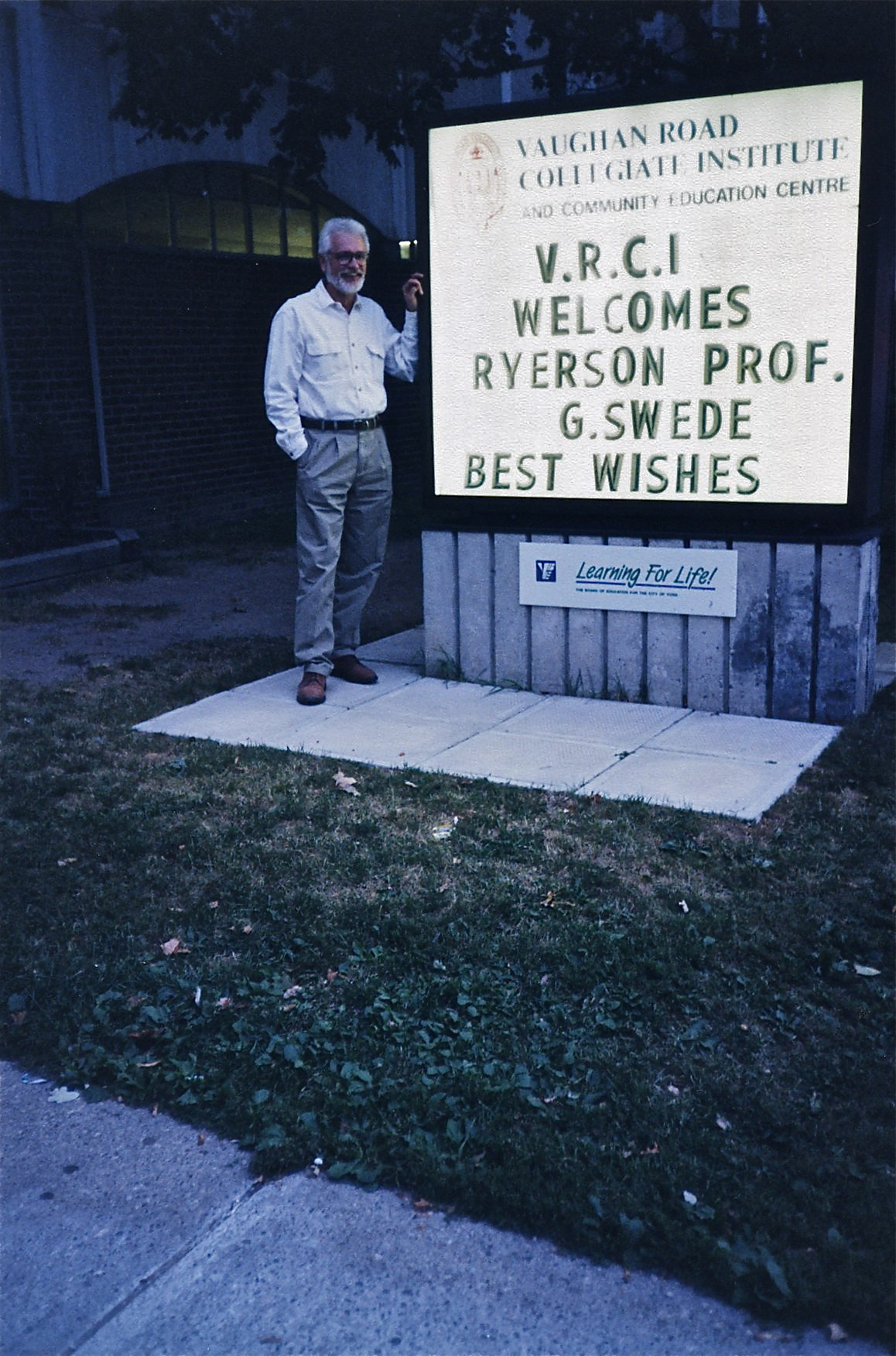
Swede's first day teaching introductory psychology to selected high school students

Swede was named the honorary curator of the American Haiku Archives for the 2008-09 term in recognition of his contributions to haiku at the California State Library in Sacramento, California.

The George Swede Papers, thus far from 1968 to 2023, are at the Fisher Library, University of Toronto. His papers are also held at the Archives & Special Collections, Toronto Metropolitan University.

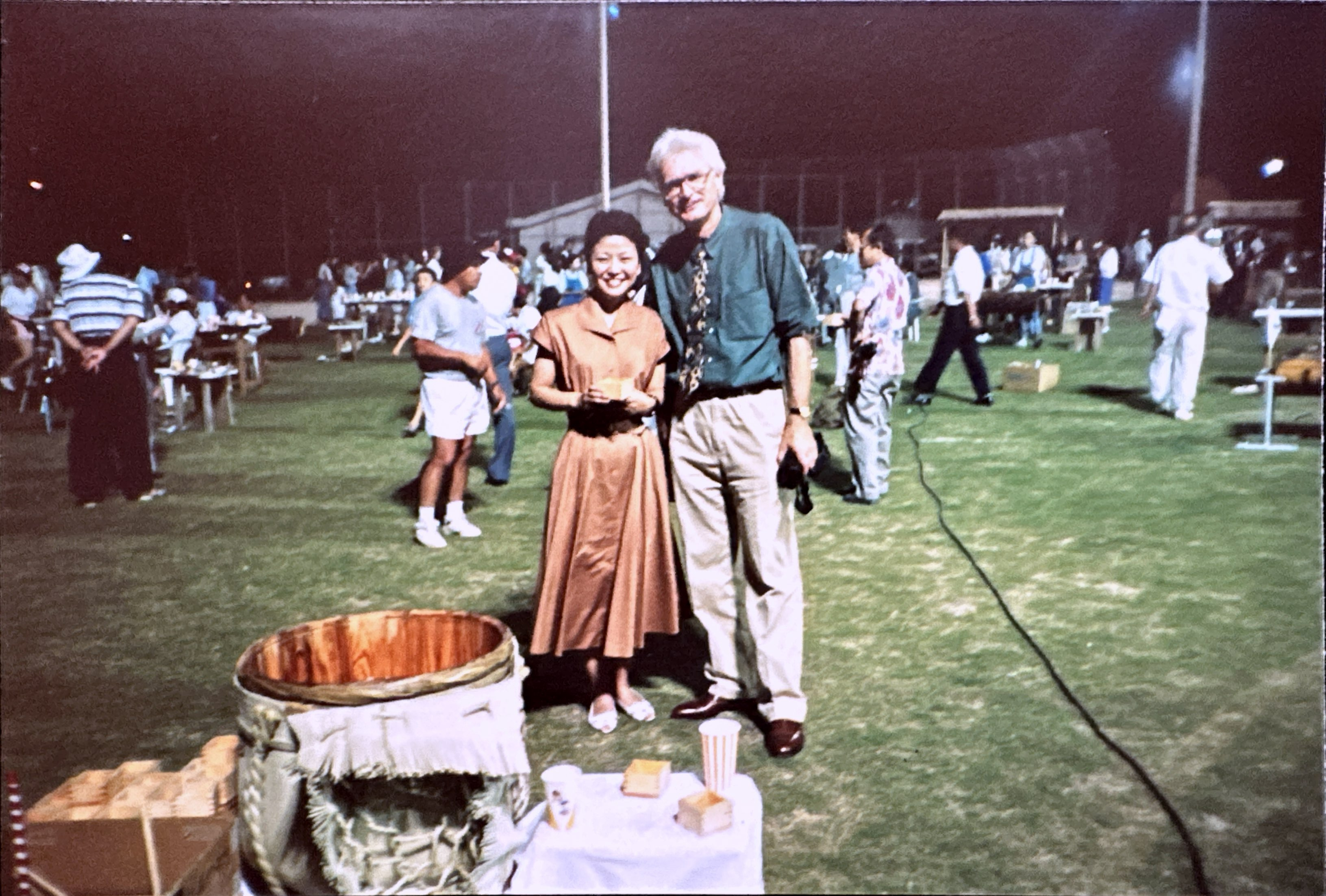
At a welcome barbecue by Japan Airlines for its first World Children's Haiku Contest, Setoda, Ikuchijima Island, Aug 22, 1990

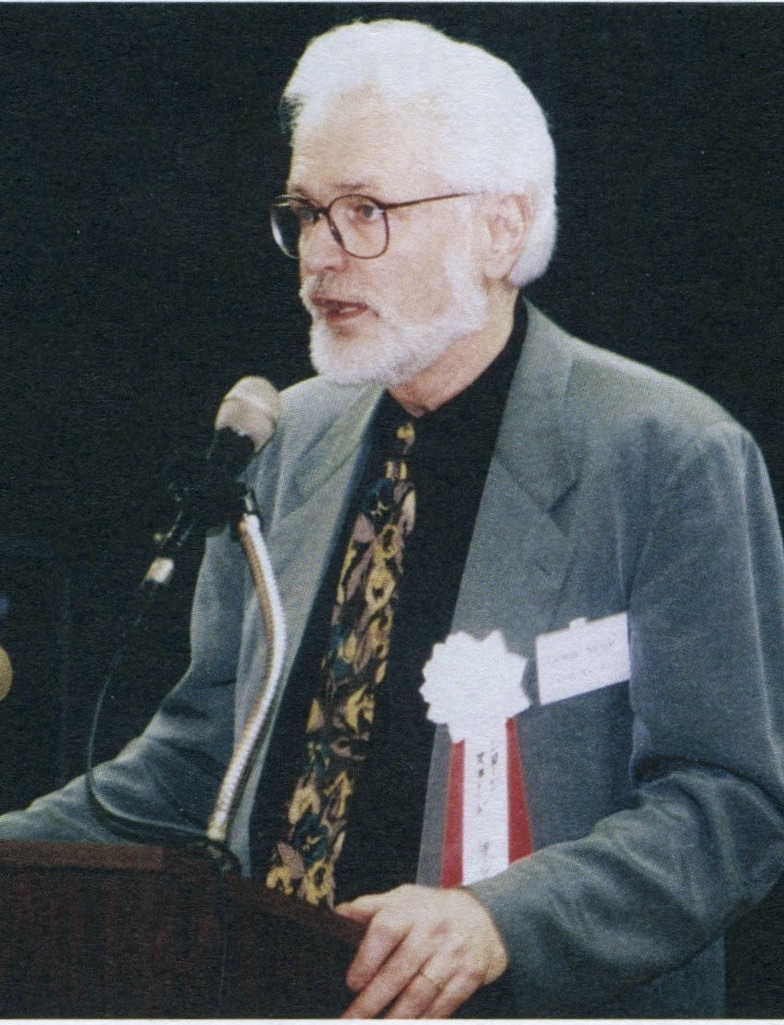
At the Haiku International Association (HIA,) Tokyo, April, 1997

Swede began writing free verse in the late 1960s, and was published in journals including:

- Antigonish Review
- Canadian Forum;
- Grain
- New Quarterly
- Open Letter
- Piedmont Literary Review
- Quarry Magazine
- Rampike
- Tamarack Review
- Toronto Life

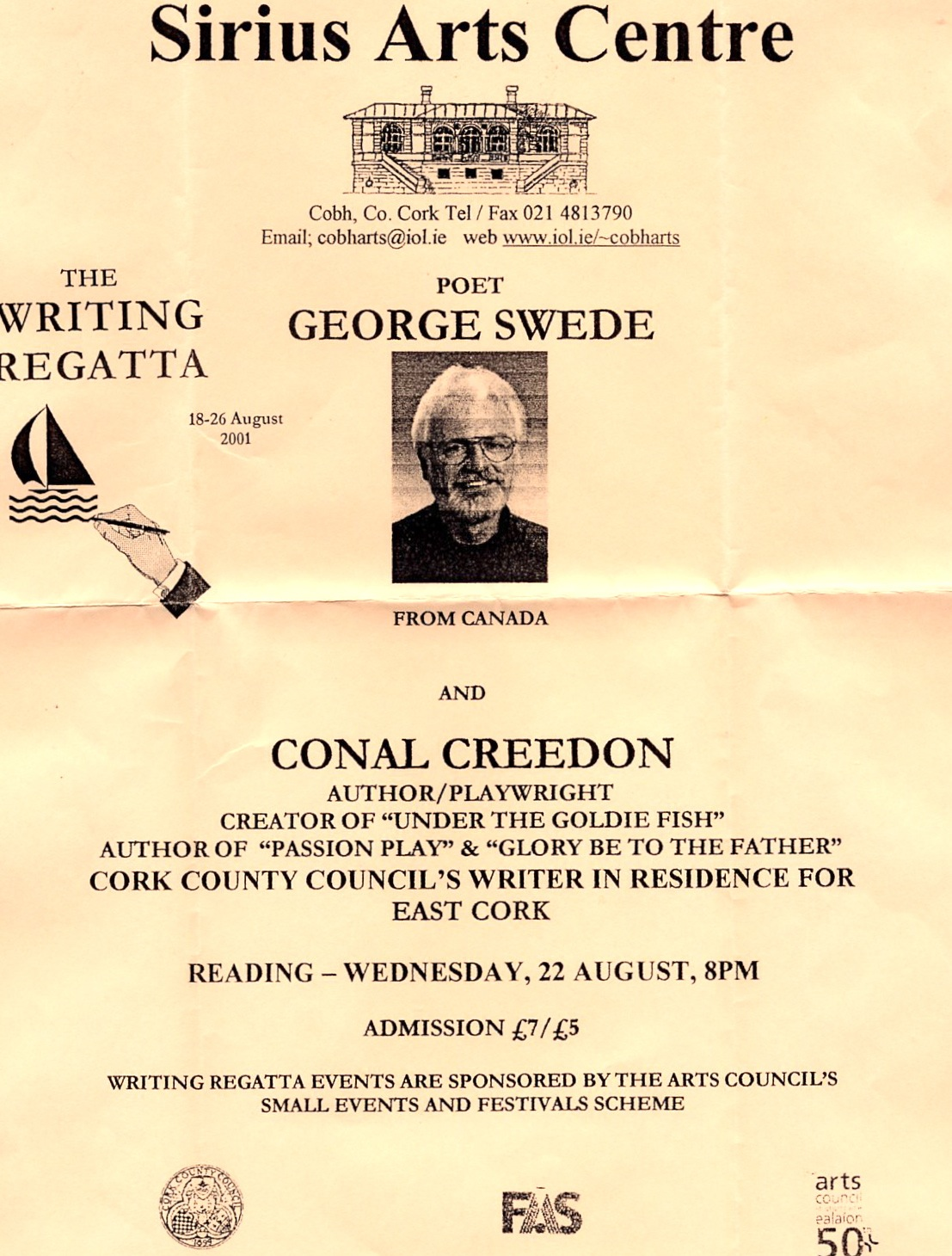
Invited to give a reading in Cobh, Ireland in August, 2001

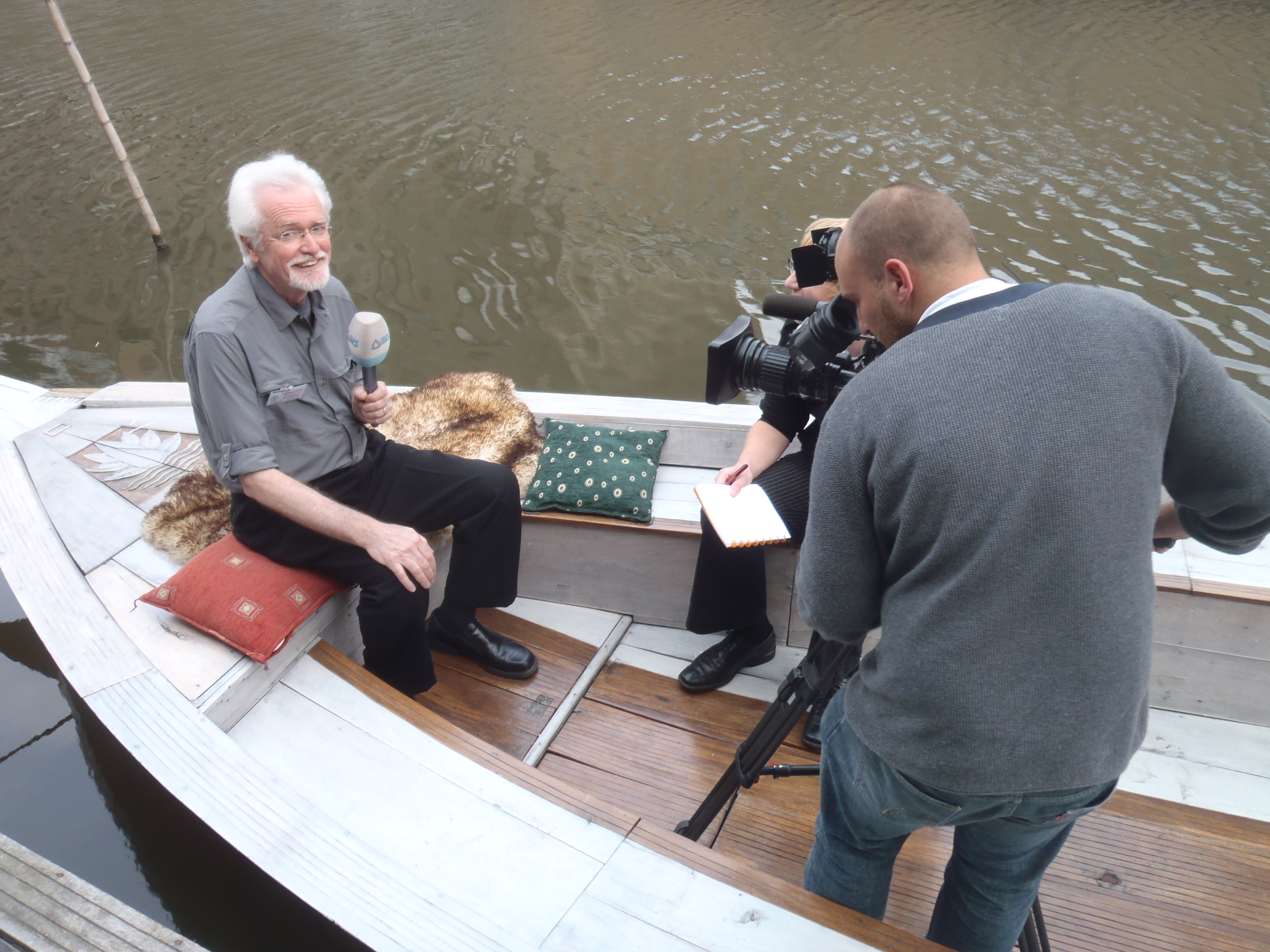
At a haiku conference in Gent, Belgium in September, 2010

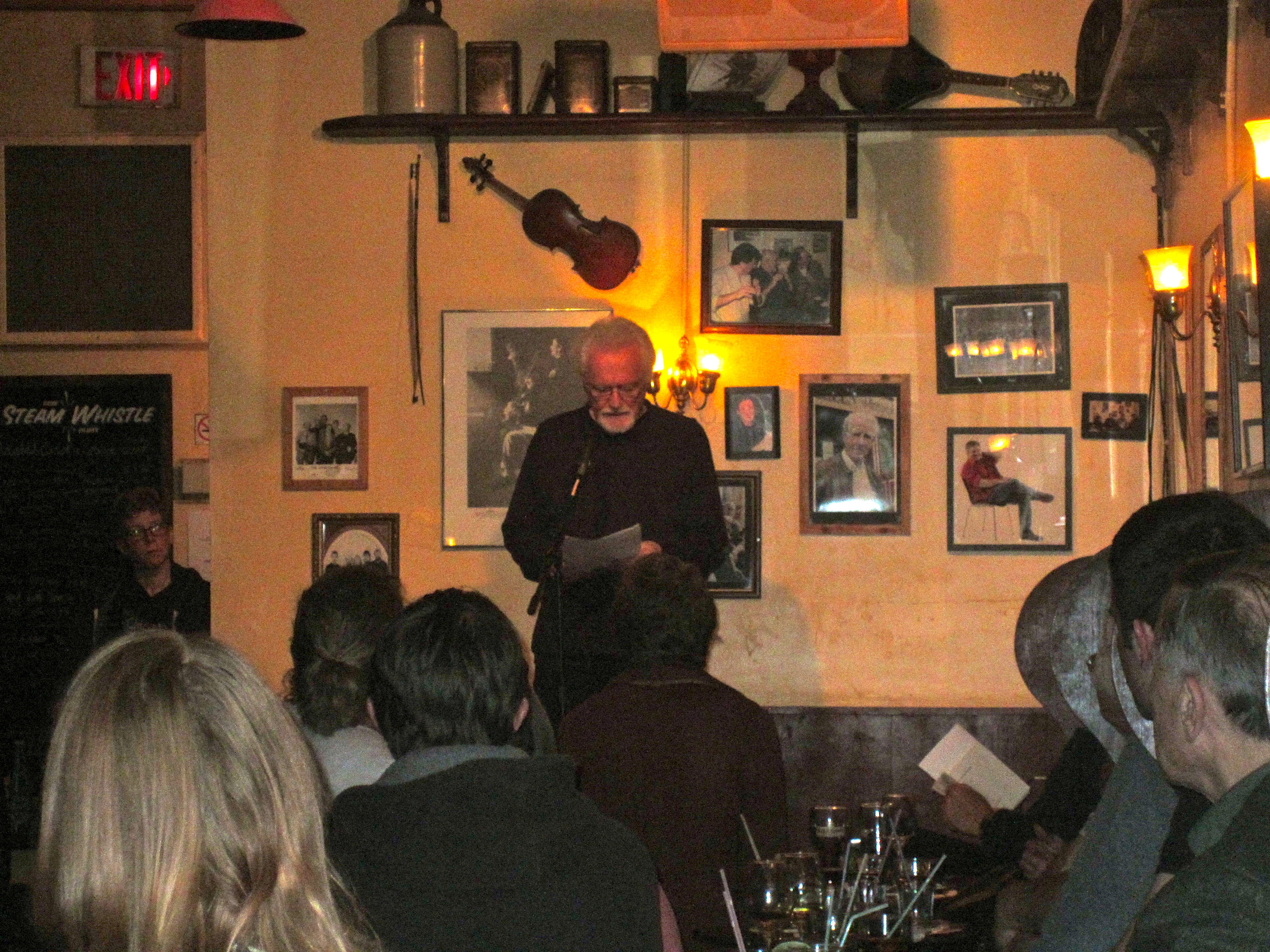
Reading his poetry at a Toronto pub, April 3, 2012

Swede's interest in the haiku began in 1976 when he was asked to review Makoto Ueda's Modern Japanese Haiku (University of Toronto Press, 1976).

Swede then began publishing in such journals as:

- Acorn
- American Tanka
- Cicada
- Frogpond
- Industrial Sabotage
- Inkstone
- Mainichi Shimbun, Haiku in English
- Modern Haiku
- Simply Haiku

In 1977, along with Betty Drevniok and Eric Amann, Swede co-founded Haiku Canada. At its 30th anniversary held in Ottawa in May 2007, Haiku Canada awarded Swede an honorary life membership. In an interview with Alok Mishra, editor-in-chief of Ashvamegh, Swede spoke about the poets who have influenced him, including Dylan Thomas, Leonard Cohen, and Ezra Pound.

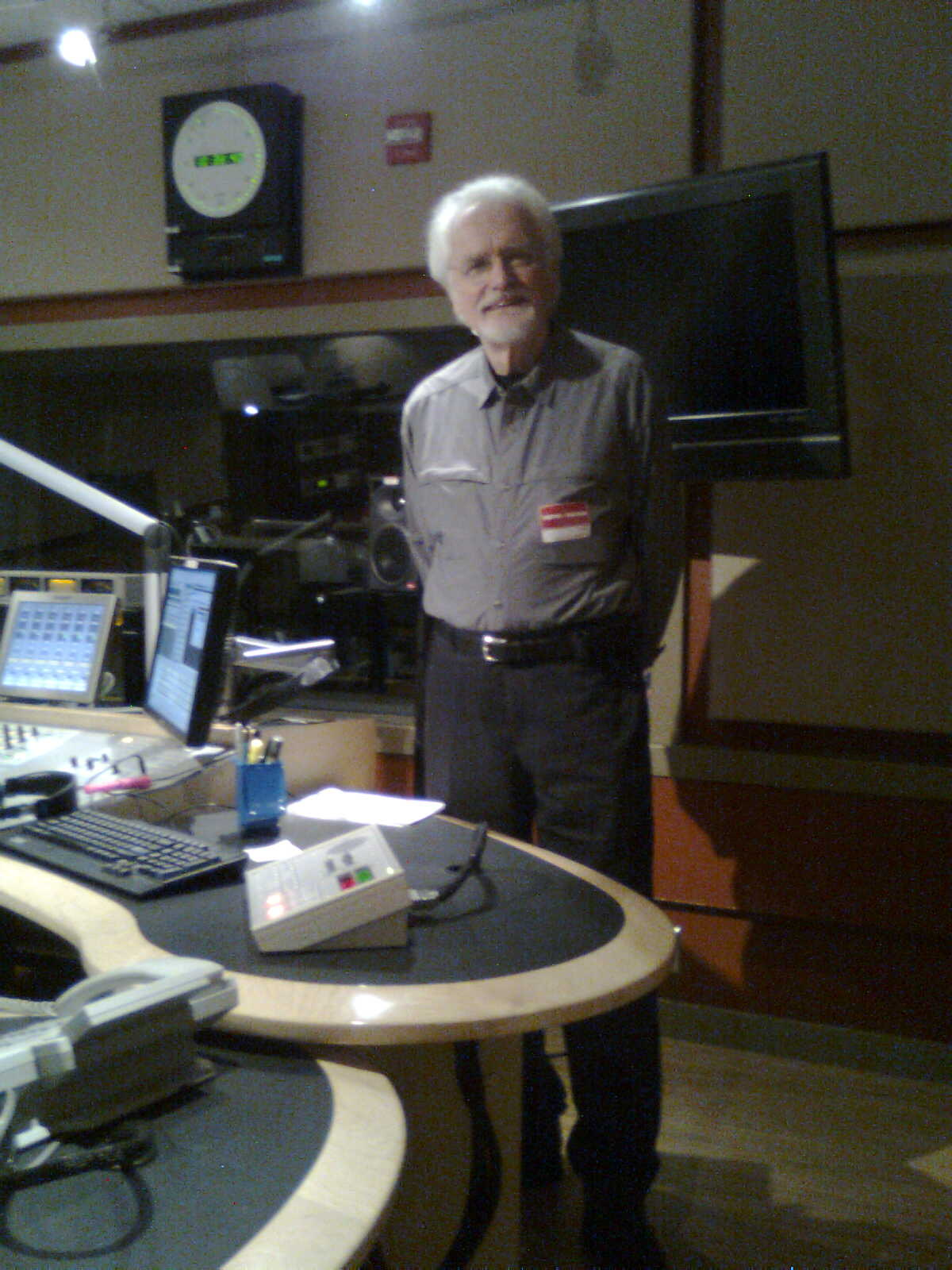
In Toronto's CBC studios about to be a guest panelist at On Point, Boston's WBUR radio, January 12, 2011

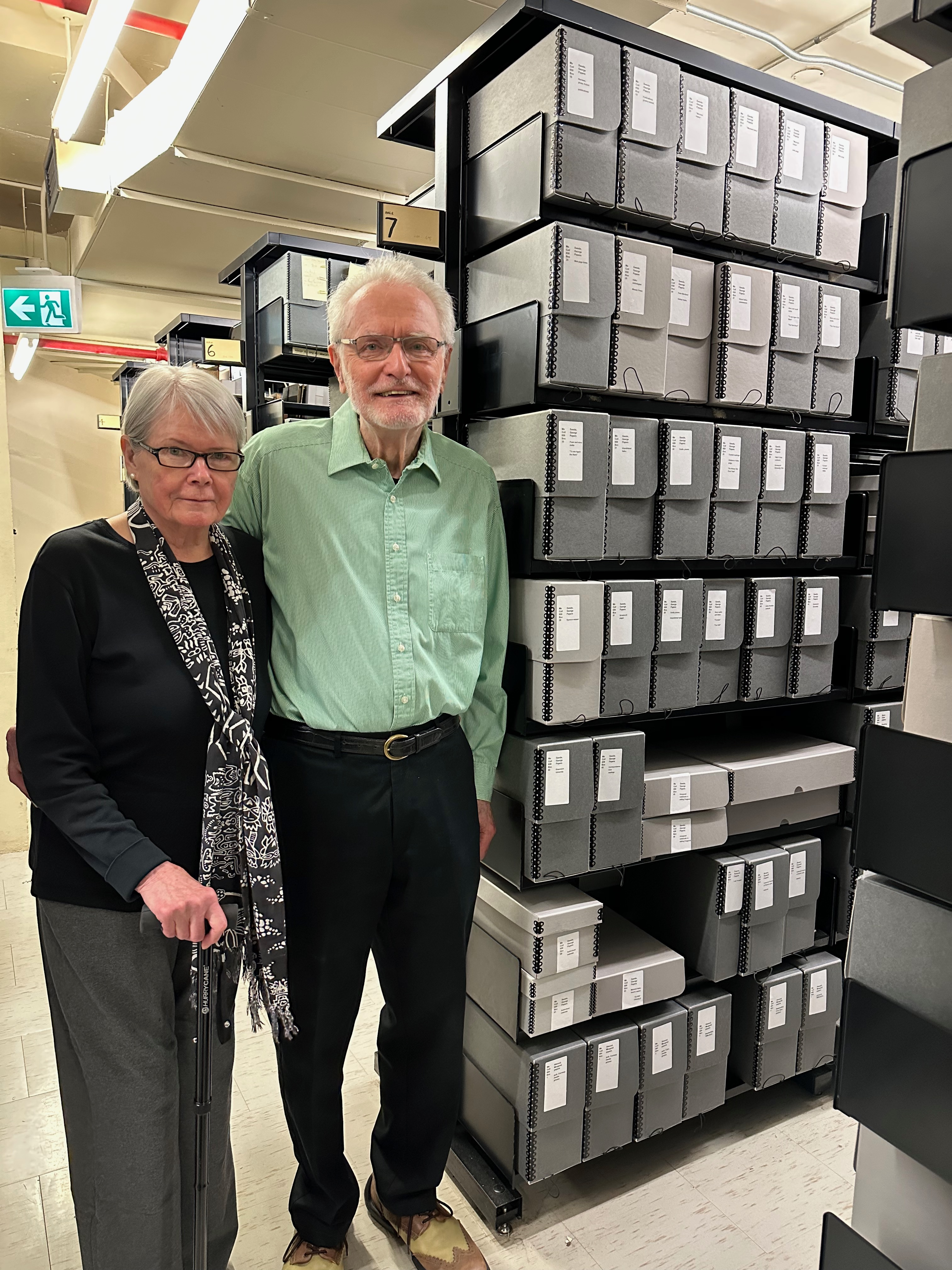
With wife, Anita Krumins, next to a stack of his papers, Fisher Library, University of Toronto, May 13, 2025

Swede combined his interests in poetry and psychology when he published an article revealing the influences, starting in childhood, that motivate someone to become a poet.

Reviews of Swede's work have appeared in numerous literary magazines as well as publications that emphasize literary criticism:

- Canadian Literature
- Books in Canada
- Canadian Children's Literature

In-depth analyses of Swede's work have appeared in the following periodicals:

- Ryerson Magazine
- Poetry Toronto
- Origin
- CJRT-FM: Contemporary Poets
- What;
- Canadian Author & Bookman
- TVOntario: In Conversation With . . .
- Blithe Spirit
- BBC Radio 3: Close To Silence
- Amanda Hill on George Swede
- haijinx
- Simply Haiku
- Hirschfield, R.″George Swede: Haiku Master & Secular Contemplative″ Beshara MagazineIssue 22, 2022, United Kingdom, 15 pars.
- Hirschfield, R. ″Discovering George Swede: The Timeless World of Haiku.″ ″3rd Act Magazine″ Winter 2022/23, U.S.A., 21 pars.
- Hirschfield, R. "The Haiku Journey of a Secular Contemplative."
- Hirschfield, R. "The Death Haiku of George Swede."

Swede's major editorial position was from 2008 to 2012 as editor of Frogpond, the journal of the Haiku Society of America.

== Awards ==
- Co-winner, High/Coo Press Mini-Chapbook Competition, 1982 for All of Her Shadows
- Museum of Haiku Literature Award, Frogpond, 5:4, 1983
- Museum of Haiku Literature Award, Frogpond, 8:2, 1985
- "Our Choice", Canadian Children's Book Centre, 1984, 1985, 1987, 1991, 1992
- Museum of Haiku Literature Award, Frogpond, 15:2, 1992
- First prize, Mainichi Daily News Haiku Contest in English, 1994
- Second prize, Mainichi Daily News 125th Anniversary Haiku Contest, 1997
- Third prize, Harold G. Henderson Haiku Contest, Haiku Society of America, 1997
- First prize, The Snapshot Press Tanka Collection Competition 2005 for First Light, First Shadows
- Associate, The Haiku Foundation, 2008
- Honorary Curator, American Haiku Archives, 2008/09
- Second prize, Mainichi Daily News Haiku Contest in English, 2008
- Scorpion Prize, "Roadrunner" 2010, 10:1, judged by Marjorie Perloff
- Second prize (Tokusen), Foreign Language Category, Kusamakura International Haiku Competition, 2010
- Honorable mention, Touchstone Book Awards 2010 for Joy In Me Still
- Grand prize (Taisho), Foreign Language Category, Kusamakura International Haiku Competition, 2011
- First honorable mention, Kanterman Book Awards 2011 for Joy In Me Still
- Scorpion Prize, "Roadrunner" 2012, 12:2, judged by Mark Wallace
- Honorable mention, Touchstone Book Awards 2014 for micro haiku: three to nine syllables
- Honorable mention, Mildred Kanterman Merit Book Award, Haiku Society of America, 2015, for micro haiku: three to nine syllables
- First prize, Mildred Kanterman Merit Book Award, Haiku Society of America, 2017, for Helices
- One of 4 winners, e-Chapbook Awards, 2019, for Arithmetic
- 3rd place, The Marianne Bluger Book and Chapbook Awards 2024 for The Way A Poem Emerges: A Haiku Trinity & Beyond

== Bibliography ==
- Unwinding (Toronto, ON, Canada: Missing Link, 1974)
- Tell-tale Feathers (Fredericton, N. B., Canada: Fiddlehead, 1978) ISBN 0-920110-56-8
- Endless Jigsaw (Toronto, ON, Canada: Three Trees, 1978) ISBN 0-88823-015-X
- A Snowman, Headless (Fredericton, N. B., Canada: Fiddlehead, 1979) ISBN 0-920110-84-3
- (ed.), Canadian Haiku Anthology (Toronto, ON, Canada: Three Trees, 1979) ISBN 0-88823-017-6
- Wingbeats (La Crosse, WI, USA: Juniper, 1979)
- As Far As The Sea Can Eye (Toronto, ON, Canada: York, 1979) ISBN 0-920424-16-3
- The Case of the Moonlit Goldust (Toronto, ON, Canada: Three Trees, 1979) ISBN 0-88823-038-9, illustrated by Danielle Jones
- This Morning's Mockingbird (Battle Ground, IN, USA: High/Coo, 1980) ISBN 0-913719-46-3; ISBN 978-0-913719-46-6
- The Case of the Missing Heirloom (Toronto, ON, Canada: Three Trees, 1980) ISBN 0-88823-027-3, illustrated by Danielle Jones
- with Anita Krumins, Quillby, The Porcupine Who Lost His Quills (Toronto: Three Trees Press, 1980) ISBN 0-88823-019-2, illustrated by Martin Lewis
- Eye to Eye with a Frog (La Crosse, WI, USA: Juniper, 1981)
- The Case of the Seaside Burglaries (Toronto, ON, Canada: Three Trees, 1981) ISBN 0-88823-044-3, illustrated by Danielle Jones
- The Modern English Haiku (Toronto: Columbine Editions, 1981) ISBN 0-919561-00-4, illustrated by Aiko Suzuki
- All of Her Shadows (Battle Ground, IN, USA: High/Coo, 1982) ISBN 0-913719-55-2; ISBN 978-0-913719-55-8
- The Case of the Downhill Theft (Toronto, ON, Canada: Three Trees, 1982) ISBN 0-88823-049-4, illustrated by Paul Kantorek
- Binary Poem (Toronto, ON, Canada: Curvd H&Z, 1982)
- Undertow (Toronto, ON, Canada: Three Trees, 1982) ISBN 0-88823-050-8
- Biased Sample (Toronto: The League of Canadian Poets, 1982)
- Tick Bird: Poems for Children (Toronto, ON, Canada: Three Trees, 1983) ISBN 0-88823-064-8, illustrated by Katherine Helmer
- Frozen Breaths (Glen Burnie, MD, USA: Wind Chimes, 1983)
- (ed.), Cicada Voices: Selected Haiku of Eric Amann 1966-1979 (Battle Ground, IN, USA: High/Coo, 1983) ISBN 0-913719-25-0
- Flaking Paint (Toronto, ON, Canada: Underwhich, 1983)
- Bifids (Toronto, ON Canada: CURVD H&Z, 1984)
- Night Tides (London, ON, Canada: South Western Ontario Poetry, 1984) ISBN 0-919139-19-1; ISBN 978-0-919139-19-0
- Time Is Flies: Poems for Children (Toronto, ON, Canada: Three Trees, 1984) ISBN 0-88823-090-7, illustrated by Darcia Labrosse
- Dudley and the Birdman (Toronto, ON, Canada: Three Trees, 1985) ISBN 0-88823-102-4), illustrated by Gary McLaughlin
- Dudley and the Christmas Thief (Toronto, ON, Canada: Three Trees, 1986) ISBN 0-88823-123-7, illustrated by Allan and Deborah Drew-Brook-Cormack
- High Wire Spider: Poems for Children (Toronto, ON, Canada: Three Trees, 1986) ISBN 0-88823-111-3, illustrated by Victor Gad
- with Eric Amann, LeRoy Gorman, The Space Between (Glen Burnie, MD, USA: Wind Chimes, 1986) ISBN 0-941190-16-1
- I Eat a Rose Petal (Aylmer, QC, Canada: Haiku Canada, 1987)
- Multiple Personality (North Vancouver, BC, Canada: Silver Birch, 1987)
- Leaping Lizard: Poems for Children (Stratford, ON, Canada: Three Trees, 1988) ISBN 0-88823-136-9, illustrated by Kimberley Hart
- with jwcurry, Where Even the Factories Have Lawns (Toronto, ON, Canada: Gesture, 1988) ISBN 0-920585-12-4
- I Throw Stones at the Mountain (Glen Burnie, MD, USA: Wind Chimes, 1988)
- Holes in My Cage: Poems for Young Adults (Toronto, ON, Canada: Three Trees, 1989) ISBN 0-88823-147-4
- (ed.),The Universe is One Poem: Four Poets Talk Poetry (Toronto, ON, Canada: Simon & Pierre, 1990) ISBN 0-88924-224-0
- I Want to Lasso Time (Toronto, ON, Canada: Simon & Pierre, 1991) ISBN 978-0-88924-234-0
- Leaving My Loneliness (Pointe Claire, QC, Canada: King's Road Press, 1992) ISBN 1-895557-03-8
- (ed.),There will Always be a Sky (Toronto, ON, Canada: Nelson Canada, 1993) ISBN 0-17-604273-3
- Creativity. A New Psychology (Toronto, ON, Canada: Wall & Emerson, 1993) ISBN 1-895131-11-1
- The Psychology of Art : An Experimental Approach (Toronto, ON, Canada: Canadian Scholar's, 1994) ISBN 1-55130-036-2
- with George Amabile, Leonard Gasparini, Seymour Mayne, and Ted Plantos, Five O'Clock Shadows (Toronto, ON, Canada: Letters Bookshop, 1996) ISBN 0-921688-13-X
- My Shadow Doing Something (Enfield, CT, USA: Tiny Poems, 1997)
- bugs (Napanee, ON, Canada: pawEpress, 1998)
- (ed. with Randy Brooks), Global Haiku: Twenty-Five Poets World-Wide (New York, NY, USA: Mosaic, 2000) ISBN 0-88962-713-4
- (ed. with Eva Tomaszewska, trans), Antologia Haiku Kanadyjskiego /"Canadian Haiku Anthology (Kraków, Poland: Wydawnictswo Krytiki Artsitycznej Miniatura, 2003) ISBN 83-7081-447-6
- Almost Unseen: Selected Haiku (Decatur, IL, USA: Brooks Books, 2000) ISBN 0-913719-99-4
- First Light, First Shadows (Liverpool, UK: Snapshot Press, 2006) ISBN 1-903543-19-3; ISBN 978-1-903543-19-1
- Joy In Me Still (Edmonton: Inkling Press, 2010) ISBN 978-0-9810725-5-5
- White Thoughts, Blue Mind (Edmonton: Inkling Press, 2010) ISBN 978-0-9810725-6-2
- (ed.), The Ultra Best Short Verse (Toronto: Beret Days Press, 2013) ISBN 978-1-897497-77-7
- embryo: eye poems (Toronto: Iņšpress, 2013) ISBN 978-0-9881179-2-1
- (with Daniel Py, translator), Le Haïku moderne en Anglais (Rosny-sous-Bois: Éditions unicité, 2013) ISBN 978-2919232512 (in French)
- micro haiku: three to nine syllables (Toronto: Iņšpress, 2014) ISBN 978-0-9881179-0-7
- helices (Winchester, VA: Red Moon Press, 2016) ISBN 978-1-936848-70-6
- (ed.),The Ultra Best Short Verse 2016 (Toronto: Beret Days Press, 2017) ISBN 978-1-926495-37-8
- (with Francisco José Craveiro de Carvalho, translator), um mosquito no meu braço(Leça da Palmeira, Portugal: Poetas da Eufeme #03)
- (ed. with Terry Ann Carter), Erotic Haiku: Of Skin On Skin (Windsor, ON, Canada: Black Moss Press, 2017) ISBN 978-0-88753-577-2
- Arithmetic
- Endangered Metaphors(Højby, Denmark: Bones Library, 2020)
- (with Sina Sanjari, translator of 50 haiku into Persian)Mist At Both Ends Of The Bridge(Vancouver, B.C.:Shahrgon Magazine, pp. 19,20)
- The Way A Poem Emerges: A Haiku Trinity & Beyond (Toronto: Lett Press, 2022) ISBN 9780988117938
