= Alexis Rotella =

American writer and artist

- Born: January 16, 1947 (age 79); Johnstown, Pennsylvania
- Education: Drew University (B.A.)
- Occupations: Poet, artist

Alexis K. Rotella (born January 16, 1947, in Johnstown, Pennsylvania) is an American poet and artist. She has written poems in several of the traditional styles of Japanese poetry, including haiku, senryū, renga, and haibun.

== Biography ==
Alexis received a bachelor's degree in philosophy from Drew University in Madison, New Jersey, where she wrote a thesis on Zen Buddhism. She also received a master's degree in Classical Acupuncture from The Academy for Five Element Acupuncture (formerly The Worsley Institute, Hallandale, Florida) as well as a doctorate in clinical hypnotherapy (American Institute of Hypnotherapy, Santa Ana, California).

In 1984, she served as the President of the Haiku Society of America and edited its haiku journal Frogpond the same year. In 2009, she founded Prune Juice, an English-language journal for senryu.

Rotella is the 2019-2020 honorary curator of the American Haiku Archives at the California State Library in Sacramento.

== Personal life ==
Alexis Rotella resides in Greensboro, North Carolina.

== Bibliography ==
=== Poetry ===
- Purple, The Merrow Report, 2014
- Clouds In My Teacup, Wind Chimes Press, 1982
- Tuning the Lily, High/Coo Press mini-chapbook #18, 1983
- After an Affair Merging Media, 1984 (Haiku Society of America Merit Book Award runner-up)
- ASK!, Muse Pie Press, 1984
- Camembert Comes from the Sea, White Peony Press, 1984
- Harvesting Stars, Jade Mountain Press, 1984
- On a White Bud, Merging Media, 1984
- Closing the Circle, Muse Pie Press, 1985
- Polishing a Ladybug, Swamp Press, 1985
- Rearranging Light, Muse Pie Press, 1985 (Haiku Society of America Merit Book Award runner-up)
- Beards and Wings, White Peony Press, 1985
- Middle City, Muse Pie Press, 1986 (New Jersey State Council on the Arts Fellowship)
- Moonflowers, Jade Mountain Press, 1987
- Drizzle of Stars (renga with Scott Montgomery and Bob Boldman), Jade Mountain Press, 1988
- The Lace Curtain, Jade Mountain Press, 1988
- Antiphony of Bells: A Haiku Journey Through Italy in Simultaneous English and Italian, Jade Mountain Press, 1989
- An Unknown Weed, King's Road Press, 1991 (Haiku Society of America Merit Book Award runner-up)
- Carousel: 30 Senryu, Juniper Press, 1991 (third place, Haiku Society of America Merit Book Awards)
- Looking for a Prince, White Peony Press, 1991
- Voice of the Mourning Dove: An Anthology of Haiku, White Peony Press, 1991
- Eleven Renga (with Florence Miller), Jade Mountain Press, 1993
- Musical Chairs: A Haiku Journey Through Childhood, Jade Mountain Press, 1994
- Yes: A Dozen Linked Poems (with Florence Miller), Jade Mountain Press, 1994
- A String of Monarchs: Thirteen Linked Poems (with Florence Miller), Jade Mountain Press, 1995
- No One Inside (linked poem with Carlos Colón), Proof Press, 1996
- Sassy (with Carlos Colón) Tragg Publishing, 1998
- Eavesdropping: Seasonal Haiku, Modern English Tanka Press, 2007
- Lip Prints (tanka), Modern English Tanka Press, 2007
- Ouch: Senryu that Bite, Modern English Tanka Press, 2007
- A Sprinkle of Glitter (a solo illustrated renga), Rosenberry Books, 2008
- Ask! Again: Rotellagrams, Rosenberry Books, 2008
- Looking for a Prince, Modern English Tanka Press, revised second edition, 2008
- Elvis in Black Leather, Modern English Tanka Press, 2009
- Black Jack Judy and the Crisco Kids, Modern English Tanka Press, 2010
- Between Waves, Red Moon Press, 2015
- The Color Blue, Red Moon Press, 2017
- Old Diaries: Short Poems and Literary Fragments, Kindle, 2018
- Different Conversations: Short Poems and Literary Fragments, Kindle, 2018
- Dancing the Tarantella: Short Poems, Jade Mountain Press, 2019
- Scratches on the Moon: A Haibun Collection, Jade Mountain Press, 2019 (Touchstone Book Award), 2019
- Scattered Sunflowers: A Ukrainian/Russian-American’s Unique Perspective on the War – Told in Art and Poetry, Jade Mountain Press, 2022
- Milkweed, Selected Haiku & Senryu (1979-2024), Brooks Books, 2024

=== Nonfiction ===
- How Words and Thoughts Affect Your Body: The Book of Affirmations, Jade Mountain Press, 1989
- The Essence of Flowers, Jade Mountain Press, 1991

=== Additional Publications ===
- Unsealing Our Secrets (#MeToo Stories), Jade Mountain Press, Touchstone Book Award, 2019
- Tanka 2020 Anthology: Poems for Today's World, Red Moon Press, 2020

== See also ==
- Carlos Colón
