= Lenard Moore =

American writer

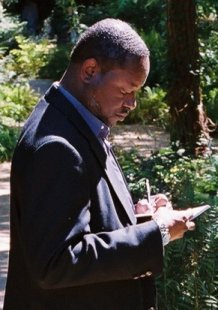
Lenard D. Moore

Lenard Duane Moore (born February 13, 1958) in Jacksonville, North Carolina. He is a writer of more than 20 forms of poetry, drama, essays, and literary criticism, and has been writing and publishing haiku for more than 20 years.

In 2008, Moore became the first Southerner and the first African American to be elected as president of the Haiku Society of America. He is executive chairman of the North Carolina Haiku Society, founder and executive director of the Carolina African American Writers' Collective, and cofounder of Washington Street Writers' Group. He has won the Sam Ragan Fine Arts Award for his contribution to the fine arts of North Carolina.

== Early life ==
Growing up, Moore was surrounded by books because his mother and father filled the house with books, as he was very close with his parents, two sisters and four brothers. Moore worked with his great-grandmother on a farm while growing up. Moore was immersed in literature, as his grandfather used to read stories to him, in which he became fascinated and started to include his grandfather in some of his creations. Moore states that his love for writing was a long process that started when he was in elementary school, like how on his long bus rides to school he would read a lot of books. This made him realize he could go places. He also had a love for words, and used to participate in plays and dramas. During 10th grade, Moore got to write short stories which became exciting and encouraging for him. When Moore reached his 20s, his life took a turning point, as he went into the army, and started to write poems during that period of time. He had a girlfriend at the time, so he was practicing writing the best poems for her back home, which became even more exciting for Moore. He has lived in South Carolina, Virginia, California, and Germany.

== Haiku ==
Lenard Moore is one of the leading Haiku poets in the United States. The year of 2023 marks forty-one years that Lenard has been writing Haiku. Lenard has eight poetry collections, a very large list of major prices including three Museum of Haiku Literature (Tokyo) Awards, and he was the first African American elected president of the Haiku Society of America. Lenard has been studying, reading and writing Haiku for a very long time. "Haiku is a way of life for me", Lenard states in an interview with Crystal Simone Smith.

== Education ==
Moore earned his M.A. degree in English/African American Literature from North Carolina's A&T State University, and his B.A. degree with magna cum laude honors from Shaw University. He was also educated at Coastal Carolina Community College and the University of Maryland.

== Career ==
Moore used to be assistant professor of English at Mount Olive College. He is a former adjunct professor at Shaw University. He has also taught at North Carolina State University-Raleigh, N.C., A&T State University-Greensboro, and Enloe High School. He is a former writer-in-residence for United Arts Council of Raleigh & Wake County.

== Poetry ==
Moore's poetry has been translated into several languages. He is the author of:

- Poems of Love & Understanding (Carlton Press, 1982)
- The Open Eye (NC Haiku Society Press, 1985)
- Forever Home (St. Andrews College Press, 1992)
- Desert Storm: A Brief History (Los Hombres Press, 1993)

Moore has taught workshops, served on literary panels, and given hundreds of readings at schools, festivals, colleges, and universities, including National Black Arts Festival, Zora Neale Hurston Festival, People's Poetry Gathering, Walt Whitman Cultural Arts Center (Camden, New Jersey), and The Library of Congress.

== Awards ==
- 1983, 1994, 2003 Tokyo Museum of Haiku Literature Award
- 1987-1988 Japan Air Lines Haiku Contest finalist out of 40,000 entries
- 1992 First prize winner in traditional style haiku, Mainichi Daily News:Tokyo, Japan
- 1992 Third prize, Harold G. Henderson Award, Haiku Society of America
- 1996 Indies Arts Award
- 1997 Margaret Walker Creative Writing Award
- 1998 Tar Heel of the Week Award
- 1998-2000 Cave Canem Fellow
- 2000 Alumni Achievement Award
- 2001 The Heron's Nest Award, first runner-up for poem "summer moon-"
- 2006 Sam Ragan Fine Arts Award for contributing to the fine arts of North Carolina

== Publications ==
=== Anthologies ===
Moore's poetry has appeared in more than forty anthologies, including:

- Ghost Fishing: An Eco-Justice Anthology (UGA Press, 2018)
- Haiku in English (W.W. Norton, 2013)
- Gathering Ground (University of Michigan Press, 2006)
- The Haiku Anthology (W.W. Norton, 1999)
- Trouble The Water: 250 Years of African American Poetry (Mentor Books, 1997)
- Spirit & Flame: An Anthology of African American Poetry (Syracuse University Press, 1997)
- Haiku World: An International Poetry Almanac (Kodansha International Ltd., 1996)
- The Garden Thrives: Twentieth Century African American Poetry (HarperCollins, 1996)
- HEIWA: Peace Poetry in English and Japanese (University of Hawaii Press, 1995)
- In Search of Color Everywhere: A Collection of African-American Poetry (Stewart, Tabori & Chang, 1994)
- Haiku Moment: An Anthology of Contemporary North American Haiku (Charles E. Tuttle Co., 1993)

He is coeditor (with Michael Dylan Welch) of the 2007 Haiku North America conference anthology, titled Dandelion Wind.
