= Carlos Colón (writer) =

American poet

- Born: April 23, 1953; Shreveport, Louisiana
- Died: October 30, 2016 (aged 63); Shreveport, Louisiana
- Education: Louisiana State University Shreveport; Louisiana State University
- Occupations: Poet, librarian

Carlos Colón (23 April 1953 – 30 October 2016) was an American poet. He primarily wrote English-language haiku and concrete poems. During his lifetime, he published over 12 chapbooks and over 1,400 poems published in a variety of journals including Modern Haiku and Frogpond.

He later was nicknamed Haiku Elvis due to the Elvis costume he would wear to do public readings of his poetry.

== Biography ==
Colón was born in Shreveport, Louisiana and lived there for most of his life. He earned his bachelor's degree from Louisiana State University Shreveport and a master's degree in library science from Louisiana State University.

He worked as a reference librarian at the Shreveport Memorial Library until his retirement.

He died from a heart attack at age 63.

== Haiku ==
The following is a famous haiku of his:

at the hazardous

waste site

an eight-leaf clover

He has written poetry books with Alexis Rotella.

He has written several "visual haiku", sometimes known as "eye-ku". He was a consultant about visual haiku for the book Haiku in English: The First Hundred Years.

His chapbook Mountain Climbing was dedicated to Marlene Mountain, among other authors.

== Honors and awards ==
In Shreveport, a mural called "Let the Good Times Roll" features one of his haiku. Shreveport also had an art project called "Highway Haiku" between 2002 and 2006, where Colón contributed two poems that were featured on billboards in the city. His work has been nominated for a Pushcart Prize.

He is a founding member of the Northwest Louisiana Haiku Society.

His work has been featured in Tazuo Yamaguchi's Haiku: The Art of the Short Poem film.

- Shreveport Regional Arts Council Literature Fellowship, 2002
- Caddo Parish Poet Laureate, 2014

== Bibliography ==
=== Poetry ===
- The Worst of Almira Gulch, self-published, 1984
- Blue Jay on a Bowling Pin, self-published, 1991
- Jiminy limericks: A collection of animal poems for children, self-published, 1991
- Mountain Climbing, self-published, 1993
- Clocking Out, self-published, 1996
- Nothing Inside, with Alexis Rotella, proof press, 1996
- Sassy, with Alexis Rotella, 1998
- Circling Bats, with Raffael de Gruttola, 2001
- Wall Street Park, with Raffael de Gruttola, 2007
- Autumn Leaves, with Raffael de Gruttola, 2010
- The Inside Scoop: New and Selected Poems, Naissance, 2010
- Haiku Elvis, Laughing Cactus Press, 2013

== See also ==
- Marlene Mountain
- Alexis Rotella
