= Maria Jacobs =

Canadian poet and publisher

- Born: October 23, 1930 (age 95) Bussum, Holland
- Occupation: Writer; publisher
- Citizenship: Canadian
- Education: Bachelor of Arts (Mathematics); Master of Arts (English)
- Alma mater: York University

Maria Jacobs (born 23 October 1930) is a Canadian poet and publisher in Ontario. Jacobs has edited several literary publications in Canada, and was the editor and publisher of the literary magazine Poetry Toronto. Jacobs co-founded the Canadian publishing company Wolsak and Wynn with Heather Cadsby in 1983, and sold the company in 2007. She has written multiple books, spanning poetry, fiction, and a 2004 autobiographical detailing her early life during the Nazi occupation of Holland.

== Biography ==
Maria Jacobs was born on 23 October 1930 in Bussum, Holland, to parents Lucie (née Wolsak) and Jacob Schröder. During the Nazi occupation of Holland, which began in 1940 when Jacobs was ten years old, her family sheltered four Jewish people in their home; an experience she details in her 2005 book A Safe House: Holland, 1940-1945. She immigrated to New York City in her early 20s, and later moved to Toronto at the age of 24. After moving to Toronto, Jacobs attended York University where she earned a Bachelor of Arts in mathematics and a Master of Arts in English. She spent six years working as the manager of the Axle-Tree Coffee House in Toronto, as well as spending several years as associate editor of Waves. She later joined Canadian Woman Studies / Les cahier de la femme as literary editor, and published and edited the monthly literary magazine Poetry Toronto until it ceased publication in 1989. Jacobs served as president of the League of Canadian Poets from 1990 to 1992.

Jacobs co-founded the Canadian publishing company Wolsak and Wynn with fellow Canadian poet Heather Cadsby in December 1982. Jacobs and Cadsby sold the company to Noelle Allen in 2007.

== Publications ==
- Jacobs, Maria (1983). Precautions against Death. Oakville, ON: Mosaic Press. ISBN 978-0-8896-2209-8. OCLC 11199136.
- —; Cadsby, Heather (1983). The Third Taboo: A Collection of Poems on Jealousy. Wolsak and Wynn: Toronto, ON. ISBN 978-0-9198-9700-7. OCLC 10525297.
- — (1985). With Other Words. Erin, ON: The Porcupine's Quill. OCLC 1087101236.
- — (1986). What Feathers Are For. Oakville, ON: Mosaic Press. ISBN 978-0-8896-2306-4. OCLC 14266024.
- — (1987). Iseult, We Are Barren. Windsor, ON: Netherlandic Press. ISBN 978-0-9194-1711-3. OCLC 16716419.
- —, ed. (1991). Dutch Gifts: Stories, Poems and Creative Non-Fiction on a Netherlandic Theme. Windsor, ON: Netherlandic Press. ISBN 978-0-9194-1723-6. OCLC 23974940.
- — (2005). A Safe House: Holland, 1940-1945. Hamilton, ON: Seraphim Editions. ISBN 978-0-9734-5885-5. OCLC 60369585.
