= Frogpond =

Haiku magazine

- Winter 2024 issue
- Editor: Allyson Whipple
- Categories: Literary magazine
- Frequency: Triannual
- Publisher: Haiku Society of America
- First issue: 1978
- Country: United States
- Website: www.hsa-haiku.org/frogpond/
- ISSN: 8755-156X

Frogpond is a haiku magazine published by the Haiku Society of America. It is published electronically three times per year and consists of English-language haiku and senryu, linked forms including sequences, renku, rengay, and haibun, essays and articles on these forms, and book reviews. Submissions may come from members and nonmembers. The first issue was published in February 1978.

Each issue of Frogpond features a $100 Best of Issue Frogpond Award sponsored by the Museum of Haiku Literature.

== Past presidents ==
- Cor van den Heuvel

== Past editors ==
- Lilli Tanzer
- Geoffrey O'Brien
- Bruce Kennedy
- Alexis Rotella
- Elizabeth Searle Lamb
- Sylvia Forges-Ryan
- Kenneth C. Leibman
- Jim Kacian
- John Stevenson
- George Swede
- Francine Banwarth
- Aubrie Cox
- Christopher Patchel
- Michael Ketchek
- Tom Sacramona
- Jacob D. Salzer
