= Tanka in English =

The composition and translation of tanka in English begins at the end of the nineteenth century in England and the United States. Translations into English of classic Japanese tanka (traditionally known as waka) date back at least to the 1865 translation of the classic Ogura Hyakunin Isshu (c. early 13th century); an early publication of originally English tanka dates to 1899. In the United States, the publication of tanka in Japanese and in English translation acquired extra impetus after World War II and was followed by a rise of the genre's popularity among native speakers of English.

== Etymology and form ==
In the time of the Man'yōshū (compiled after 759 AD), the term "tanka" was used to distinguish "short poems" from the longer chōka (長歌; "long poems"). In the ninth and tenth centuries, however, notably with the compilation of the Kokin Wakashū, the short poem became the dominant form of poetry in Japan, and the originally general word waka (和歌, "Japanese poem") became the standard name for this form. The Japanese poet and critic Masaoka Shiki revived the term tanka in the early 20th century as part of his tanka modernization project, similar to his revision of the term haiku.

Tanka consist of five units (often treated as separate lines when romanized or translated) usually with a pattern of 5-7-5-7-7 sounds (onji is an inaccurate term for this). The group of the first three, 5-7-5, is called the kami-no-ku ("upper phrase"), and the second, 7-7, is called the shimo-no-ku ("lower phrase"). In English, the units are often rendered as lines and indeed some modern Japanese poets have printed them as such; Hiroaki Sato notes that such lineation is not representative of the Japanese, where mono-linear units are the norm, and Mark Morris comments that tanka and other forms are "packed" by "Anglophone scholars...into a limited repertoire of rectilinear containers".

== Composition and translation ==
As reviewers of translated work have pointed out, translating tanka, a form heavily dependent on "variation of sounds", is "no easy task" and "choices of language and interpretation are essentially a matter of taste".

== History ==
=== Early history ===
The earliest work of Japanese literature to be translated into English was the Ogura Hyakunin Isshu, a collection of waka compiled by Fujiwara no Teika in the 13th century. Frederick Victor Dickins (1835-1915), a medical officer in the Royal Navy, translated and published the work anonymously in the March 1865 issue of the Chinese and Japanese Repository. Another early translation into English is Yone Noguchi's translation of the same work, and William N. Porter published translations from it in 1909. The first North American tanka collections are Sadakichi Hartmann's Tanka and Haika: Japanese Rhythms (1916) and Jun Fujita's Tanka: Poems in Exile (1923). The first known anthology containing original English tanka was Tanka and Hokku, edited by Edith Brown Mirick, in 1931. The first North American collection containing tanka in English written by a person not of Japanese descent was Blue Is the Iris by Eleanor Chaney Grubb, 1949.

=== Post-World War II ===
Tanka publication in English was sporadic until after World War II when various Japanese North American tanka poets began publishing anthologies and collections in both Japanese and English, as well as bi-lingual editions. These efforts apparently began immediately after the poets were released from internment camps in Canada and the United States. An important contributor was Yoshihiko Tomari, active in the Tule Lake Segregation Center, where he saw tanka as "an active spiritual and cultural force for his people" and organized "a tanka network among the camps, gathered poems, produced mimeographed publications, and circulated them to other camps".

A notable American translator and writer of tanka was Lucille Nixon, who in 1957 became the first foreigner selected to participate in the Utakai Hajime, the Imperial New Year's Poetry Reading of Japan. Nixon had been part of the "Totsukuni Tankakai", the Totsukana Tanka Society of San Francisco, which was founded in 1927 by Yoshihiko Tomari. She was tutored in Japanese and tanka by her housekeeper, Tomoe Tana. With Tana, she published a volume of tanka translations by Japanese Americans into English, Sounds from the Unknown (1963). The journal of the Totsukuni Tankakai published tanka in English as well as Japanese during the 1950s, making it the first known journal to publish tanka in English. The second English-language journal to specifically include tanka was SCTH (Sonnet Cinquain Tanka Haiku) published from 1964 to 1980, edited by Foster and Rhoda de Long Jewell. In 1972, the Kisaragi Poem Study Group's Maple: poetry by Japanese Canadians with English translation appeared, a collection like Sounds of the Unknown. In the United Kingdom, the first known English-language anthology was the Starving sparrow temple anthology: haiku, tanka, linked verse and other pieces edited by William E. Watt, 1971, but this publication was not exclusively tanka. By 1969, tanka started appearing in anthologies of student work published by public schools in the United States.

One notable poet composing tanka in English in the 1970s was Kenneth Rexroth, a poet of the so-called San Francisco Renaissance—Rexroth had "thorough[ly] assimilated" Japanese poetry as a translator of for instance Fujiwara no Teika and several poems from the Man'yōshū (compiled 8th century), and composed his own tanka in a similar style. The popularity of tanka compared to that of haiku has remained minor, with tanka often being mistaken for haiku, despite the confessional nature of tanka.

== Organizations and journals ==
Tanka journals were published in the United States in Japanese starting in the 1920s. Bilingual English-Japanese journals were published in the 1950s. Only more recently have there been journals devoted exclusively to tanka in English, including American Tanka (1996) in the United States, edited by Laura Maffei, and Tangled Hair in Britain, edited by John Barlow. The first English-language tanka journal, edited by Kenneth Tanemura and Sanfold Goldstein, Five Lines Down, began in 1994, but lasted only a few issues. The Tanka Society of America Newsletter began in 2000, but focused mostly on society news rather than being a tanka journal, but this changed in 2005 when the organization started Ribbons in 2005. Atlas Poetica has been published since 2007. Before these journals, various haiku journals also included tanka, such as Woodnotes, Frogpond and Mirrors. Starting in 1990, Jane Reichhold ran the annual Tanka Splendor contests that resulted in an annual booklet announcing the winners.

The Tanka Chapter of the Chaparral Poets of California was operating in the early 1960s, as mentioned in the Introduction to Sounds from the Unknown (1963), but it is not known whether it published a journal. It published an anthology in 1975, entitled simply Tanka. The Tanka Chapter is no longer extant. No new anthologies were published in English until Footsteps in the Fog, edited by Michael Dylan Welch, published in 1994 by Press Here, and then Wind Five Folded, edited by Jane and Werner Reichhold, published later in 1994 by AHA Books. The Tanka Society of America was founded by Michael Dylan Welch and its inaugural meeting was held in April 2000 in Decatur, Illinois. This society publishes the tanka journal Ribbons, and holds an annual tanka contest now named after Sanford Goldstein, as well as conferences every two years. Tanka Canada also publishes a journal titled Gusts, edited by Kozue Uzawa. The Anglo-Japanese Tanka Society (UK) hosted a web site with tanka and articles but the website is defunct and the organization now appears to be inactive.

== See also ==
- Senryū
- Haikai
