= Heather Cadsby =

Canadian poet and publisher

Heather Roberts Cadsby is a Canadian poet and publisher from Ontario. Cadsby is the co-founder of the Canadian publishing company Wolsak and Wynn, and sold the company in 2007. She has released several poetry collections beginning in 1981, and was the winner of the North York Poetry Awards in 1985.

== Biography ==
Heather Cadsby was born in Belleville, Ontario and graduated with a Bachelor of Arts from McMaster University. In 1981 she released her first book of poetry, Traditions, published by Fiddlehead Poetry Books.

In 1982, Cadsby co-founded the Canadian publishing company Wolsak and Wynn with Maria Jacobs in Hamilton, Ontario. In 1983, Cadsby and Jacobs published a poetry collection together through Wolsak and Wynn entitled The Third Taboo: A Collection of Poems on Jealousy. Cadsby's 1988 book Decoys, published by Mosaic Press, was described in the Telegraph-Journal as "women's writing at its best", and was praised for its lively and upbeat prose.

Her third poetry collection, A Tantrum of Synonyms, was published in 1997 by Wolsak and Wynn, the same year the company celebrated 15 years of publishing exclusively poetry. The book was well-received by critics, with Libby Scheier noting in The Toronto Star that Cadsby had "matured and deepened" with the style and lyricism of her poetry.

Cadsby and Jacobs retired from Wolsak and Wynn in 2007, selling the company to Noelle Allen. Cadsby has since released four more books through various publishers, such as Could Be in 2009 and Standing in the Flock of Connections in 2018.

== Publications ==
=== Poetry ===
- Cadsby, Heather (1981). Traditions. Fredericton, NB: Fiddlehead Poetry Books. ISBN 978-0-8649-2007-2. OCLC 9909230.
- —; Jacobs, Maria (1983). The Third Taboo: A Collection of Poems on Jealousy. Hamilton, ON: Wolsak and Wynn. ISBN 978-0-9198-9700-7. OCLC 10525297.
- — (1988). Decoys. Oakville, ON: Mosaic Press. ISBN 978-0-8896-2399-6. OCLC 17768576.
- — (1997). A Tantrum of Synonyms. Hamilton, ON: Wolsak and Wynn. ISBN 978-0-9198-9757-1. OCLC 39123904.
- — (2009). Could Be: Poems. Kingston, ON: Brick Books. ISBN 978-1-8940-7873-3. OCLC 320585124.
- — (2012). Text Steps: Poems. Toronto, ON: Goose Lane Editions. ISBN 978-0-9691-1252-5. OCLC 1036190995.
- — (2018). Standing in the Flock of Connections. Kingston, ON: Brick Books. ISBN 978-1-7713-1479-4. OCLC 1012347382.
- — (2023). How to. Ottawa, ON: Above/Ground Press. ISBN 978-1-7746-0305-5. OCLC 1404835974.

=== Anthologies ===
- — (1982). Squid Inc, 1982: An Anthology of Poems. Willowdale, ON: Squid. ISBN 978-0-9691-1250-1. OCLC 15977458.
- — (1986). Squid Inc 86. Willowdale, ON: Squid. ISBN 978-0-9691-1251-8. OCLC 16034044.
- — (1989). Vivid: Stories by Five Women. Stratford, ON: Aya Press. ISBN 978-0-9205-4465-5. OCLC 20097168.

== Recognition ==
- Writer's Digest Best 100 (1973)
- North York Poetry Awards (1985)
