= Elizabeth Lamb =

Elizabeth Lamb is the name of:

- Elizabeth Lamb, Viscountess Melbourne (1750–1818), political hostess, wife of Peniston Lamb, 1st Viscount Melbourne
- Elizabeth Lamb (athlete) (born 1991), New Zealand high jumper
- Elizabeth Searle Lamb (1917–2005), American poet
