= Robin Gill =

Robin Gill may refer to:

- Robin Gill (journalist) (born 1978), Canadian journalist
- Robin Gill (priest) (born 1944), British Anglican priest, theologian, and academic
- Robin D. Gill (born 1951), American Japanologist
- Robin Gill (businessman) (1927–2026), English businessman

== See also ==
- Robin Gillett
