= Raymond Roseliep =

American writer

Raymond Roseliep (August 11, 1917 – December 6, 1983) was a poet and contemporary master of the English haiku and a Catholic priest. He has been described as "the John Donne of Western haiku."

== Early life ==
Born on August 11, 1917, in Farley, Iowa, to John Albert Roseliep (1874–1939) and Anna Elizabeth Anderson (1884–1967). In 1939 he graduated from Loras College with a Bachelor of Arts, in 1948 he received a Master of Arts in English from Catholic University of America, and in 1954 he received a Doctor of Philosophy in English Literature from Notre Dame University. He was ordained, June 12, 1943, at St. Raphael's Cathedral, Dubuque, Iowa.

== Poetry ==
He won the Haiku Society of America Harold G. Henderson award in 1977 and 1982. In 1981, Roseliep's haiku sequence, “The Morning Glory”, appeared on over two thousand buses in New York City:

takes in
the world
from the heart out

funnels
our day
into itself

closes
on its own
inner light

== Bibliography ==
- The Linen Bands - 1961
- The Small Rain - 1963
- Love Makes the Air Light - 1965
- Flute Over Walden - 1976
- Walk in Love - 1976
- Light Footsteps - 1976
- A Beautiful Woman Moves with Grace - 1976
- Sun in His Belly - 1977
- Step on the Rain - 1977
- Wake to the Bell - 1977
- A Day in the Life of Sobi-Shi - 1978
- Sailing Bones - 1978
- Sky in My Legs - 1979
- Firefly in My Eyecup - 1979
- The Still Point – Haiku of Mu - 1979
- Listen to Light - 1980
- Swish of a Cow Tail - 1982
- Rabbit in the Moon, Alembic Press (November 1983) ISBN 978-0-934184-16-8
- The Earth We Swing On - 1984

== See also ==
- Elizabeth Searle Lamb
