= Tazuo Yamaguchi =

Japanese-American poet, filmmaker, musician, storyteller, painter/Illustrator, puppeteer

Tazuo Basho Yamaguchi is a Japanese-American poet, filmmaker, storyteller, musician, painter, illustrator and puppeteer. He both a national and world head-to-head haiku champion. He is also master of the English form of haiku and senryū. He has published four books of poetry and six recorded volumes. He also produced the National Poetry Slam, International World Poetry Individual Slam, Women of the World DVD from 2002 to 2013.

Tazuo Yamaguchi has made two documentary films: Pass It Around (2000) documenting the first ever Asian Spoken Word Summit that took place in Seattle WA, and Haiku: The Art of The Short Poem (2007) the first ever English Language Haiku Documentary. Haiku: The Art of The Short Poem was at the annual Haiku of America Conference in Winston-Salem and featured Sonia Sanchez, William J. Higginson (Haiku Handbook) and many other contemporary Haiku poets. He published Symphony (2019) a collection of his paintings, illustrations, stories and poems from his epic Matsu. He is a partnered streamer on twitch.tv (2018).

He has published four picture books all from his epic Matsu: Where It's At (2019), Eyes on The Sir-prize (2019), After The Big Race (2020) (a story that tells what happened after the classic Aesop fables tale Tortoise and The Hare) and The first of a series Don't Get Mad At The Monster (2021).

Yamaguchi is the founder of IPaintCreatures & The FunkyiPuppets (2021) - the first ever audio theater Troupe formed on clubhouse to start to tell his epic story MATSU. Matsu is a fantasy and sci-fi epic composed in the grand tradition of Tales of the Heiki, The Illiad and Odyssey. He is the founder of MatsuVerse PBC, a public company formed in February 2023 to support the telling of his epic storyworld experience MATSU. For MatsuVerse PBChe put together IPaintCreatures (his artist moniker) (2016) and The FunkyiPuppets puppet troupe in the grand tradition of Jim Henson's Muppets to tell the story of Matsu. With MatsuVerse PBC, Tazuo is carrying on the grand tradition of such creature storytellers as Shigeru Mizuki, Jim Henson, Charles Shultz, Shel Silverstein, George Lucas, Dr. Seuss, and Miyazaki.

== Biography ==
=== Early life ===
He was born to Edward and Betty Yamaguchi in Tokyo, Japan, into a Japanese American family. Through his grandmother Yamaguchi has direct royal descent to the royal shigin poets and samurai class of ancient Japan. Tazuo was named after his master shigin poet grandmother, Tazue Sakaguchi. He was diagnosed with bone cancer at the age of eleven, and was told his left arm would need to be amputated. It was estimated he had only four more years to live. For treatment, his mother used alternative methods of healing.

Yamaguchi holds three college degrees from California State University, Chico in Learning and Cognition Psychology, Multi=Media Arts, and a Masters in Education emphasis of Fine Arts and Technology (Summa cum laude)

=== Business ventures ===
In 1991, Yamaguchi was chosen from 8,000 applicants from around the world to work with George Lucas on several educational entertainment-based projects. During this position working directly with George Lucas - he applied his painting/Illustration, poetic storytelling skills, and filmmaking multi-media skills with LucasFilm, he discovered the power of mythic storytelling through digital media and the introduction to Joseph Campbells works. He also helped the formation of GLEF - the George Lucas Educational Foundation.

From 1992 to 2004, Yamaguchi ran a San Francisco-based company called Xstudios specialising in emerging digital technologies such as interactive media and computer-based training, and part of the multimedia revolution in the San Francisco Bay Area, where many companies (Pyramid Technologies, Oracle, Apple Computers, Autodesk, Intel Corporation, Microsoft Corporation were involved in integrating the traditional arts of storytelling, poetry, illustration, and the fine arts with emerging digital technologies.

=== Poetry career, Arts Educator, Filmmaker, Painter, Storyteller ===
In 1996, Yamaguchi participated in the 15th annual Taos Poetry Circus in Taos, New Mexico. He met Bob Holman, and was introduced to the 1981 Chicago-invented oral tradition of Al Simmons' Original World Heavyweight Poetry Bouts, which years later morphed into Poetry Slam. He then proceeded to take his film gear to Portland, Oregon to the 1996 National Poetry Slam. He filmed most of the event and participated in a haiku competition, a genre of poetry he had practiced since grade school, and became the "1996 National Head to Head Haiku Champion." He also collaborated with Paul Devlin, a national sport videographer and director of critically acclaimed slam poetry documentary SlamNation. In 2001 he produced his first documentary film, about the Asian American spoken word national movement, called Pass it Around (PIA).

In 1997, Yamaguchi formed the first National "poetry slam" team from northern California with Sacramento-based jazz poet Mario Ellis Hill, punk poet Matt Rouse, and bluesman from Grass Valley, John Barbato. He and the team attended the 1997 National Poetry Slam in Connecticut, and filmed a majority of the competition. In 1998, Yamaguchi attended the National Poetry Slam in Austin, Texas to film the competition, documenting finals night perfect tens from Jason Edwards, Jason Carney and Gno, and the spoken-word breakthrough of that year's national champion Reggie Gibson.

Each year from 2001 to 2005, Yamaguchi took the Chico Speaks Out National youth slam team to the Brave New Voices festival. They won the Best of Show National Spirit Award in 2003, performing on the finals stage, and placed third in the nation in 2005.

Since 2001, Yamaguchi has produced live slam poetry DVDs from a number of national events, including the National Poetry Slams in Seattle in 2001, Chicago in 2003, St. Louis in 2004, Albuquerque in 2005, and Austin in 2006 (where he was also a host), and the Individual World Poetry Slams in Greenville, South Carolina in 2004, Worcester, Massachusetts in 2005, and Charlotte, North Carolina in 2006. The 2004 slam in Greenville saw him win the World Haiku head-to-head championship, which he also filmed.

In 2007, Yamaguchi hosted the first ever Haiku head to head matches at the Haiku Society of America Conference in Winston-Salem, North Carolina. He also documented the conference and began production on a film about Haiku in English, entitled Haiku. He hosted the national Head to head Haiku bout in Austin, Texas to the sold out audience of 300 plus at the famous blues club Antone's. He formed the first American Haiku Battle Duo with Adam 'Henzbo' Henze.

From 2007 - 2016, Yamaguchi toured the country performing poetry in the 50 continental states of USA- delivering a set of poetry based in performance poetry and the improvisation - and the original form of spoken poetry - also leading many educational workshops at major universities and national conferences (the national mental health conference in Florida)

In 2008, Yamaguchi worked on two graphic Haiku novels: Orugen and TheAmericanBuddhas. He planned to film the first Women of the World Poetry Slam in March 2008 in Detroit. His film Haiku was due for release in the spring of 2008.

In 2017, Yamaguchi discovered Twitch.TV and began streaming a variety show streamed live that consisted of spoken poems and matsu storytelling, live painting and illustration and creature character development of his fantastical creatures from his epic story Matsu and started to develop The FunkyiPuppets and performed his first puppet Rah Live. He took the moniker of iPaintCreatures as his artistic name and became internationally known as IPC. He became a partnered streamer and began doing painting and illustrated commissions for a worldwide audience. In (2019) produced SYMPHONY - his first book of his paintings, drawings, Sketches, MATSU Poems and stories - the first MATSU graphic Novel

In 2019, Yamaguchi continued his long-term work as an Art Educator - working with K-12 schools with poetry, visual art, and multimedia to aid in the healing of trauma caused by the Paradise Campfire. Yamaguchi also began creating magic on the Clubhouse app as the director of the first social media audio theater troupe called iPaintCreatures and The FunkyiPuppets. He and his band of beloved misfits (said in the most beautiful way possible) are doing the Making Art Together Supporting Unity (MATSU).

In 2020 to 2022, Yamaguchi (IPC) continued his work as an art educator and refined his focus to exhibiting that making art together supporting unity has a lot of value in helping individuals heal from trauma caused by socialization, environmental disasters and worldwide pandemics.

In 2022, he formed Matsuverse PBC - a public benefit company to start compile his lifelong work of short stories, poems and world building and character designs and development for his epic story experience; Matsu which he began to prepare fully to produce MATSU TV series, original music, comedy skits, and funkyipuppet puppetry routines, animated films, puppetry films, Picture Books etc.

Yamaguchi formed MatsuVerse PBC with SK (Scott Kiere) a long time friend and collaborator to license and deliver MATSU to mainstream audiences worldwide. - 2022 also began the reformation of Onelife Foundation (a non-profit 501 (c) dedicated to Tazuo's long term work in education - with a mission to Make Art Supporting Unity in all areas of Life by Supporting Education Through the Arts and technology - supported by sales of Matsuverse products, media and films.

Spring - Summer - Winter of 2023 Yamaguchi and onelife foundation became a recipient of California arts councils upstate creative core grants to bring awareness how making art together supporting unity helps in improving public health through allowing individual to heal and become more informed about their uniqueness and originality - giving them more self awareness.

In 2024, Yamaguchi released ‘Arrival’ an hour and 20 minute documentary documenting the matsu project funded by the grant received by California arts council.

Fall and Winter of 2024 into 2025, Yamaguchi continued his work in the schools working with 4-5th graders teaching them how to draw and paint from their imagination for creative expression and self awareness. End of 2024=2025 Tazuo started the hands on production of the epic story experience Matsu to release many MATSU related Films, TV Series, Music, Novels Picture Books, Live Performances, Funkyipuppets for worldwide distribution
