= Wolsak and Wynn =

Canadian publishing company

Wolsak & Wynn Publishers
- Founded: 1982; 44 years ago
- Founders: Heather Cadsby; Maria Jacobs
- Country of origin: Canada
- Headquarters location: Hamilton, Ontario
- Publication types: Books
- Imprints: Buckrider Books; James Street North Books; Poplar Press
- Owner: Noelle Allen
- Official website: www.wolsakandwynn.ca

Wolsak & Wynn Publishers is a Canadian publishing company based in Hamilton, Ontario. It was founded in 1982, and has been owned by Noelle Allen since 2007. Imprints of Wolsak and Wynn include Buckrider Books, James Street North Books, and Poplar Press.

== History ==
Wolsak and Wynn was founded in 1982 by the Canadian poets Heather Cadsby and Maria Jacobs in Hamilton, Ontario, originally publishing only poetry. By 2003, Wolsak and Wynn was releasing about six books per year. After Cadsby and Jacobs retired in 2007, Wolsak and Wynn was purchased by Noelle Allen, who had worked for the publisher for multiple years beforehand. After Wolsak and Wynn was purchased by Allan, its scope was expanded to include fiction, non-fiction, and translations. Books published by Wolsak and Wynn have won awards such as the Scotiabank Giller Prize and multiple Governor General's Literary Awards.

== Imprints ==
Wolsak and Wynn launched their imprint Buckrider Books in 2014, with Paul Vermeersch as senior editor. Other imprints of the publisher include James Street North Books and Poplar Press.

== See also ==
- Poetry Toronto
- Bibliography of Canada
- List of English-language book publishing companies
