= Karai Senryū =

Japanese poet

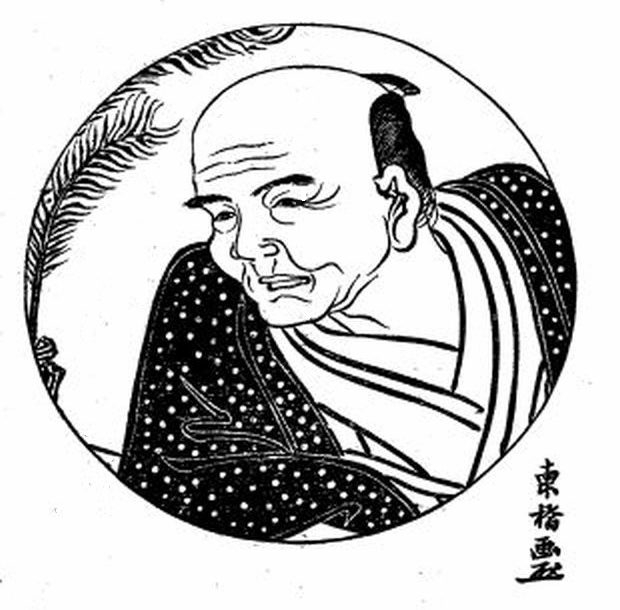
- Born: Karai Hachiemon; 1718; Edo, Japan
- Died: October 30, 1790 (aged 71–72)
- Writing career
- Genre: Senryū

Karai Senryū (柄井 川柳; 1718 – October 30, 1790), whose real name is Karai Hachiemon (柄井 八右衛門) was a Japanese poet and poetry judge (tenja). He popularized a form of poetry similar to haiku called senryū, which is named after him. "Senryū" was the nickname that he adopted when he started judging poetry, and other poetry judges after him also adopted this name. The word senryū means "river willow" in Japanese.

== Biography ==
Hachiemon was a government official in the Asakusa district of Edo, a post that he inherited from his father.

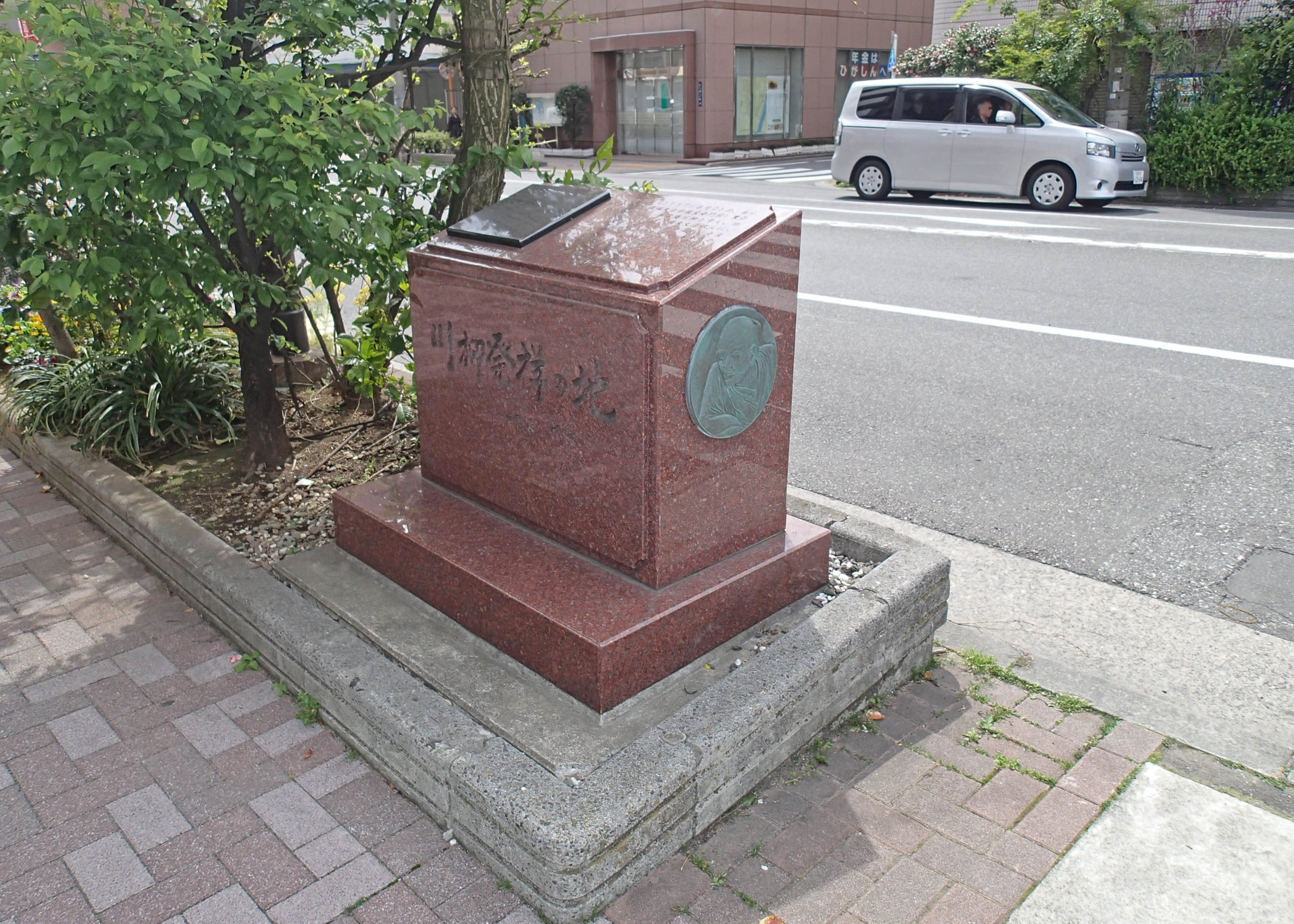
Monument to Senryū

Karai became the judge of Maekuzuke competitions (川柳評万句合, Senryūhyō Manku Awase) in Edo. The Maekuzuke was a popular style at the time which consisted of a participant adding their own verses to an already existing verse. Karai would judge these verses with a point system. And from there, he collected ten thousand of these poems each year, the best of which were distinguished and published. There is a monument for him at the location where he judged the first Maekuzuke in Japan. It has been said that Senryū judged over 2,300,000 verses in his lifetime.

In 1765, Senryū's disciple published an anthology of Senryū's selected haiku called Willow Barrel (Haifū yanagidaru, commonly known as just Yanagidaru in Japanese) that reflected Senryū's sense of humor and style. He later published several other anthologies throughout his lifetime that gained in popularity. During the Meiji era, this style of poems became known as senryū. The first 23 volumes of Willow Barrel were published while Senryū was alive. Overall, 167 volumes were published.
