= Robin D. Gill =

American poet

Robin Dallas Gill, born in 1951 at Miami Beach, Florida, USA, and brought up on the island of Key Biscayne in the Florida Keys, is a bilingual author in Japanese and English.

He first wrote extensively on stereotypes of Japanese identity before moving on to publishing his research on (as well as translations of) Japanese poetry, especially the genres of haiku and senryū. Since 2013, he has been engaged in writing in Japanese for a Japanese audience, hoping to help, via introductions to the comic traditions of Japanese poetry, to shake Japan out of its "cultural doldrums". Much of his output has, according to Gill's own testimony, been done while a pauper for much of his life.

He is considered a 'maverick' writer within the field of Western studies on Edo-period poetry. He writes haiku in Japanese under the haigō (haikai pen-name) Keigu (敬愚:'Yours foolishly', an homophonous pun on 敬具:'Yours truly').

== Education ==
On completing high school, Gill spent a year in Mexico City in 1968 learning etching and Spanish, before proceeding to Georgetown University to study International Politics at the Edmund A. Walsh School of Foreign Service. He graduated in 1976, and spent the following two academic years doing graduate work in Honolulu at the Department of Far Eastern Languages, University of Hawaii.

== Career ==
He worked at the Japan Translation Center from 1978 to 1980. He then was employed as Acquisitions Editor, identifying English nonfiction books fusing science and the humanities for publication in Japanese, translation checker and foreign secretary for the Tokyo publishing firm Kōsakusha. From 1990, he simultaneously worked for a new publishing house, editions Papyrus. He returned to the United States in 1998, and after an interlude of several months in the following year researching, among other things, Luís Fróis at the British Library, he returned to the United States and set up his own publishing company to produce a long sequence of books that endeavour to travel over, in thematic sequences, the highways and byways of Japanese poetry.

== Works ==
Gill's work focuses on kigo or seasonal keyword thematics in traditional Japanese poetry, ranging widely over haiku, senryū, waka and kyōka (狂歌:crazy poems), concentrating in each successive book on sub-themes, with the poems arranged in thematic chains. Characteristically, he provides the original Japanese text, with romanized transliteration, a word-for-word literal gloss, and then multiple versions (what he calls by his portmanteau neologism, paraverse, though the method was used by Hiroaki Sato. ) that enable the reader to see the variety of potential readings to be elicited from an otherwise ostensibly simple, straightforward set of verses, accompanied by notes. Gill's richness of competing English versions of the one original has been seen as a distinct advance on earlier renderings of Japanese poetry, while his digressive style, often original but somewhat diffuse, can distract and, Kern argues, make too much demands on the reader's time.

Gill's work has been neglected by area scholarly journals and Japanology in particular, perhaps, as Adam Kern, Professor of Japanese Literature and Visual Culture at the University of Wisconsin-Madison suggests, because the author flaunts his unconventional approach, and appears to present his translations and commentaries in a style that suggests he is an ' entertainer or agent provocateur or playful self-promoter. Kern's view is, that despite several idiosyncrasies of personal style and formatting that render his approach trying to readers, Gill's works

may ... be preferable, even with all their quirks, to the preponderance of academic translations of Edo-period comic poetry.

=== Rise Ye, Sea Slugs! ===
He first came to the attention, through listserve blogs, of scholars of Japanese poetry with his Book Rise Ye, Sea Slugs! 1000 Holothurian Haiku, (2003), a comprehensive collection (running to 480 pages, accompanied by a set of translations of Japanese poems thematically dedicated to the sea-cucumber, namako. Gill's competence in this arcane area was called on, and acknowledged, by the University of Guam's Alexander Kerr, a marine biologist, working on a philology of the Holothurians from antiquity to Linnaeus. Thomas Rohlich, now Emeritus Professor of Japanese Language and Literature at Smith College, hailed it as

'a treasure, and belongs on the bookshelves and in the hands of Japanese literary scholars, haiku and nature enthusiasts.'

Likewise, William J. Higginson wrote that

'these poems come to life as no other haiku translated from Japanese have ever come to life before...This single-topic tome may be our best English-language window yet into the labyrinth of Japanese haikai culture.'

Gill followed this up with an equally detailed delving into the extensive poetic haiku sub-culture built over centuries treating the theme of the Japanese fly (hae).

=== Octopussy ===
In 2009 Gill self-published Octopussy, Dry Kidney & Blue Spots: Dirty Themes from 18c–19c Japanese Poems. This work consists of Gill's compilation, explorative translations and commentaries on Edo-period genre of comical haiku, known as senryū, with a particular focus on, the "filthy" poems in that genre, overlapping with known senryū, as bareku (破礼句:'lewd verse': literally "etiquette-violating verse"). This genre, amply collected in a 4-volume Edo period work called Suetsumuhana (Safflowers, 1776–1801) has often been ignored by scholarship, informed by a certain distaste and prudishness about the crudity of lower-class comic wit. Gill is one of the two people, the other is the ex-academic John Solt, who have challenged the negative, dismissive view associated with the passing references to the genre in the works of Reginald Horace Blyth, Donald Keene, Makoto Ueda and Faubion Bowers. Kern, after cautiously noting that Gill's presentations of his material might give casual editors the impression that the author is parodying the Nabokovian Charles Kimbote or even William Chester Minor, acclaims this and a sister book on the topic as "a significant contribution to Edo studies", "[b]ombilating with verve", and "stand[ing] out from the huggermugger of scholarly discourse on similar topics, which more often than not disappoints as eminent but dull", and sums up his achievement in breaking the bowdlerized approach to the subject by concluding that:

it is in breaking the wrongheaded if entrenched pattern of dismissive lip service to randy verse—that is, of barely acknowledging bareku in order to try to repress it—that gill's Octopussy is to be singled out for especial praise.'

== List of works ==
- Omoshiro Hikakubunka-kō (おもしろ比較文化考) Kirihara Shoten, Tokyo 1984
- Han-nihonjinron (反日本人論—a touch of nature ドドにはじまる) Kōsakusha, Tokyo 1985. Preface by introduction by Edwin O. Reischauer
- Nihonjinron tanken (日本人論探険－ユニークさ病の研究) TBS Britannica Tokyo 1985
- Goyaku tengoku kotoba no PLAY to MISPLAY(誤訳天国 ことばのPLAYとMISPLAY) Hakusuisha, Tokyo 1987
- Kora!mu (コラッ！！む 雑学エッセイ集:1983-1988) Hakusuisha, Tokyo 1989
- Eigo-wa Konna-ni Nippongo! (英語はこんなにニッポン語 言葉くらべと日本人論) Chikuma Shobō, Tokyo 1989
- Chūgoku no Maza Gusu, 北沢書店/Kitazawa Shoten, Tokyo 1991
- Orientalism & Occidentalism: Is the Mistranslation of Culture Inevitable?, Paraverse Press, Florida 2004., ISBN 0-9742618-2-3, ISBN 978-0-9742618-2-9
- Rise, Ye Sea Slugs! 1,000 holothurian haiku, Paraverse Press, Florida 2003. ISBN 0-9742618-0-7, ISBN 978-0-9742618-0-5
- Fly-ku! to swat or not to swat, Paraverse Press, Florida 2004. ISBN 0-9742618-4-X, 9780974261843
- Topsy-Turvy 1585: a translation and explication of Luis Frois S.J.'sTratado:611 ways Europeans and Japanese were contrary, Paraverse Press, Florida 2004. ISBN 0-9742618-1-5, ISBN 978-0-9742618-1-2
- The Fifth Season: Poems for the Re-creation of the World, Paraverse Press, Florida, 2007. ISBN 0-9742618-9-0
- Cherry Blossom Epiphany: The poetry and philosophy of a flowering tree, Paraverse Press, Florida 2007.ISBN 0-9742618-6-6 (pbk) 978–0-9742618-6-7
- The Woman Without a Hole - & Other Risky Themes from Old Japanese Poems, Paraverse Press, 504 pages, Florida, 2007, ISBN 0-9742618-8-2, ISBN 978-0-9742618-8-1. Alternate title: Octopussy, Dry Kidney & Blue Spots - Dirty Themes from 18c–19c Japanese Poems, ISBN 0-9742618-5-8, ISBN 978-0-9742618-5-0
- Mad in Translation, Paraverse Press, 740 pages, 2009 - ISBN 0-9742618-7-4, ISBN 978-0-9742618-7-4; a shorter version, at 460 pages exists of this text, with ISBN 0-9742618-3-1, ISBN 978-0-9742618-3-6
- Kyōka, Japan's Comic Verse: A Mad in Translation Reader, Paraverse Press, 300 pages, 2009, ISBN 0-9840923-0-7, ISBN 978-0-9840923-0-7
- A Dolphin in the Woods, In the Floods A Wild Boar: Composite Translation, Paraversing & Distilling Prose, Paraverse Press, 248 pages, Florida, 2009. ISBN 0-9840923 -1-5 (pbk), 978-0-9840923–1-4
- The Cat Who Thought Too Much: An Essay Into Felinity, Paraverse Press, 312 pages, Florida, 2010, ISBN 978-0-9840923-2-1
- 古狂歌 ご笑納ください: 万葉集まで首狩に行ってきました. Florida, 2017 ISBN 978-0-997-94630-7
- 古狂歌 物に寄する恋: 託せば思ひも軽くなります. Florida, 2017ISBN 978-0-997-94631-4
- 古狂歌 滑稽の蒸すまで: 鮑の貝も戸ざさぬ国を祝ふ. Florida, 2017 ISBN 978-0-997-94632-1
- 古狂歌 気の薬のさんぷる袋: 「ご笑納ください」の大文字短縮版. Florida, 2017 ISBN 978-0-997-94633-8

== Sources ==
- Fraleigh, Matthew (February 2015). "Review of Daniel T. Reff, Richard K. Danford and Robin D. Gill (ed. and trans.): The First European Description of Japan, 1585: A Critical English-language Edition of Striking Contrasts in the Customs of Europe and Japan by Luis Frois, S.J., (Japan Anthropology Workshop Series.) xi, 299 pp. London: Routledge, 2014". Bulletin of the School of Oriental and African Studies. 78 (1): 222–224. doi:10.1017/S0041977X14001323.
- Hebert, David G. (2011). Wind Bands and Cultural Identity in Japanese Schools. Springer. p. 18. ISBN 9789400721784.
- Higginson, William J. (Winter–Spring 2004). ""Rise, Ye Sea Slugs!": A Theme from In Praise of Olde Haiku, with Many More Poems and Fine Elaboration". In Gurga, Lee (ed.). Modern Haiku.
- Kern, Adam L (2009). "Review Article". Early Modern Japan. 17. Ohio University Press: 22–37. hdl:1811/44710.
- Kerr, Alexander M (May 2013). "A Philology of Ὁλοθούριου: From Ancient Times to Linnaeus, including Middle and Far Eastern Sources" (PDF). University of Guam Marine Laboratory.
- Rohlich, Thomas H. (Spring 2005). "[unknown title]". Metamorphoses: A Journal of Literary Translation. 13 (1): 378–379.
- Sugimoto, Yoshio [in Japanese]; Mouer, Ross E. (1989). Constructs for Understanding Japan. London and New York: Kegan Paul International. p. 2.
- Wilson, Robert D.; Gill, Robin (Winter 2013). "An Interview with Robin D Gill". Simply Haiku. 10 (2).
