= Marlene Mountain =

American poet (1939–2018)

- Born: December 11, 1939; Ada, Oklahoma
- Died: March 15, 2018 (aged 78)
- Education: University of Oklahoma (BFA); University of North Dakota (MA)
- Spouse: John Wills (m. 1966; div. 1978)
- Children: 1
- Writing career
- Genre: Poetry

Marlene Mountain (née Morelock; December 11, 1939 – March 15, 2018), also known as Marlene Morelock Wills, was an American poet, artist, and activist. She wrote many English-language haiku and concrete poems.

From 2014 to 2015, she served as the 18th honorary curator of the American Haiku Archives at the California State Library in Sacramento.

Femku Magazine has an annual haiku contest named after Mountain since 2018.

== Biography ==
Mountain was born in Ada, Oklahoma. She attended East Central State College for two years before transferring to the University of Oklahoma, where she earned a BFA in painting in 1962. She was a member of the Delta Phi Delta art honorary society. She later earned an MA in painting from the University of North Dakota.

Mountain married John Wills in 1966. Following his career moves, they lived together in Wilmington, North Carolina and Statesboro, Georgia, before moving to a farm in east Tennessee in 1971.

She began writing haiku in 1968. She self-published her first chapbook of poetry, the old tin roof, in 1976. Her essay "One Image Haiku" was first published in 1978.

She co-edited the "Other Rens" series of linked verse books (2000–2002) with poets Kris Kondo and Francine Porad.

== Writing ==
She wrote several one-line haiku and was also known for writing visual haiku (short poems that had visual effects like that of concrete poetry), which she referred to as "dadaku" or "unaloud haiku" and are sometimes also called "eye-ku".

== Personal life ==
Mountain married John Wills, another haiku poet, in Duluth, Minnesota in 1966. They had one son together in 1967 and divorced in 1978.

== Bibliography ==
- the old tin roof, 1976, self-published
- Pissed off poems; and Cross words, 1986
- cur*rent (with Francine Porad), Vandina Press, 1998
- probably: 'real' renga sorta (with Francine Porad), Vandina Press, 2002
- one-line twos (with Kala Ramesh), Bones, 2015

== See also ==
- Carlos Colón
