= Poetry Toronto =

Canadian literary magazine

- Categories: Literary magazine
- Founder: Maria Jacobs
- Country: Canada
- Based in: Toronto

Poetry Toronto was a Canadian literary magazine for most of the 1980s in Toronto, Ontario, Canada.

== Founders ==
Maria Jacobs is a Canadian publisher, writer, and, poet who along with fellow Canadian writer Heather Cadbsy was the head of Poetry Toronto magazine in the 1980s. The poetry magazine had distributed publications for about a decade. Born in the Netherlands in 1930, Maria's family was witness to the hardships of war, during which they housed and hid Jewish people in order to protect them from danger. Maria and husband Peter Moens ultimately relocated to Toronto, Ontario, Canada where she continues to reside in the Beaches. Though she never took her matrimonial last name, choosing instead to defy patriarchal beliefs and develop a last name of her own. Maria and Peter eventually had and raised five children together while developing their life in Canada. in Toronto, Ontario. She also ran a coffee house (The Axle-tree Coffee House) which was a meeting place for the artistically inclined including both poets, and musicians. She has written several books and poetry anthologies, and edited for various other works. She and Heather Cadsby developed the publishing company Wolsak and Wynn. Together with writer Maria Jacobs, the two poets established Poetry Toronto Magazine in the 1980s, which is no longer in publication. Wolsak and Wynn was called such, due to the two founders, Cadbsy and Jacobs putting together maiden names from females in their family tree. Heather is a graduate of McMaster University and has written and had published many anthologies of poetry and books.
