= Utakai Hajime =

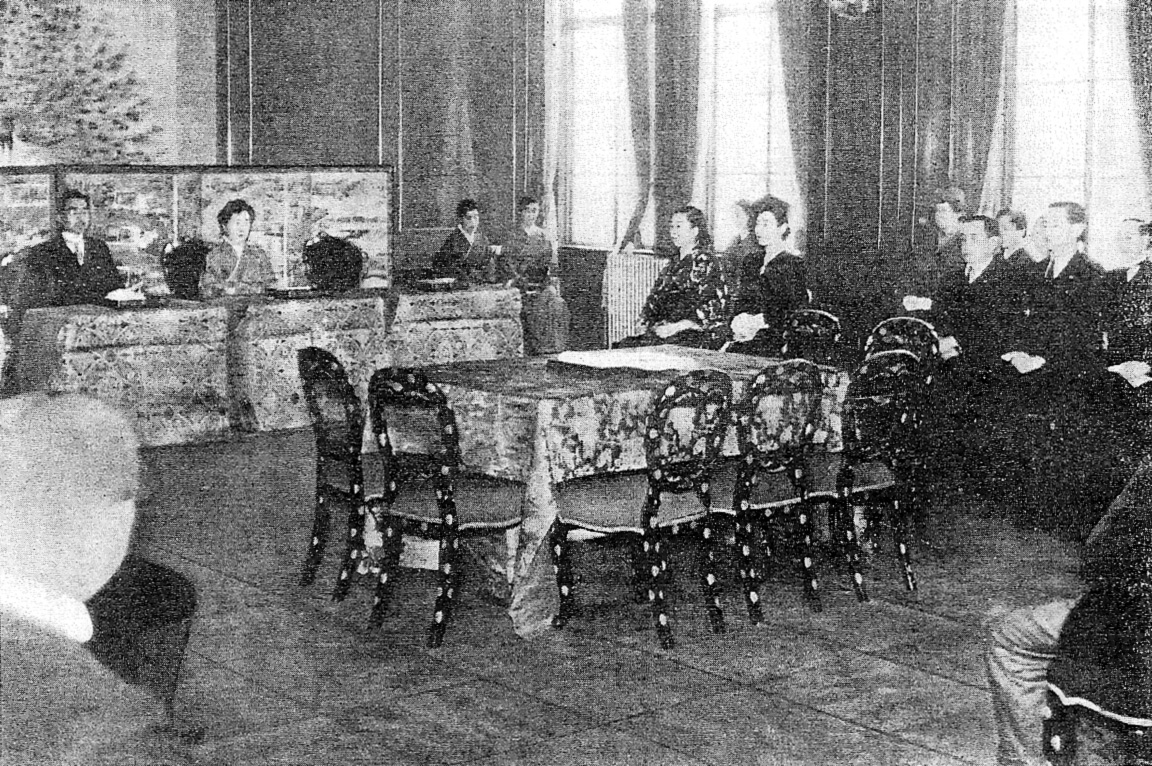
Utakai Hajime in 1950

The Utakai Hajime (歌会始, First poetry competition) is an annual gathering, convened by the Emperor of Japan, in which participants read traditional Japanese poetry on a common theme before a wider audience. It is held on 1 January at the Tokyo Imperial Palace, and is broadcast live on the NHK General TV and abroad on NHK World Premium.

== History ==
The exact origins of the tradition are unclear, though it is known that the Emperor Kameyama convened a January poetry reading, at the Imperial Palace in Kyoto, as early as 1267. Sometime during the Edo period the practice became more regular, and since the Meiji restoration of 1869, it has been held almost every year.

Poems written by the general public were admitted for consideration for the first time in 1879. Since 1946, any poet whose work is selected is invited to attend. In 1957 American poet Lucille Nixon became the first non-Japanese person to do so.

== Poetry ==
Poems read at the ceremony belong to the tanka genre.
