= Canadian Author & Bookman =

Literary journal

- Country: Canada
- Province: Ontario
- City: Toronto
- First Issue: January, 1919
- Final Issue: 1998
- Founder: B. K. Sandwell
- Alternative Names: Canadian Bookman; Canadian Author & Bookman, and Canadian Poetry; Canadian Author

Canadian Author & Bookman was a quarterly journal containing literary selections as well as articles of interest to Canadian writers. For most of its life it was the official voice of the Canadian Authors' Association (CAA). After having undergone a name change to Canadian Author and later to Canadian Author and Bookman, and Canadian Poetry, publication was suspended in 1998.

== History ==
The magazine was started in 1919 with the name Canadian Bookman. Its founding editor was B. K. Sandwell. The first issue appeared in January 1919. The magazine contained publication notices and articles about authors and literary history, as well as essays about literary style and genres.

In 1921 it became the official media outlet of CAA, providing information both of interest to and also about Canadian writers, as well as providing a voice for the CAA through editorials.

The magazine was renamed as Canadian Author & Bookman in 1943, and was sold at newsstands beginning in 1945 with a sturdier binding.

In 1963 the magazine absorbed Canadian Poetry magazine, which had been established in 1936. Issues began to be titled Canadian Author & Bookman, and Canadian Poetry. Canadian Author & Bookman ceased publication in 1998.

Renamed Canadian Author, the magazine was revived, and although its future was uncertain at times, it continued to be published by the CAA.
