= Crystal Simone Smith =

American Poet

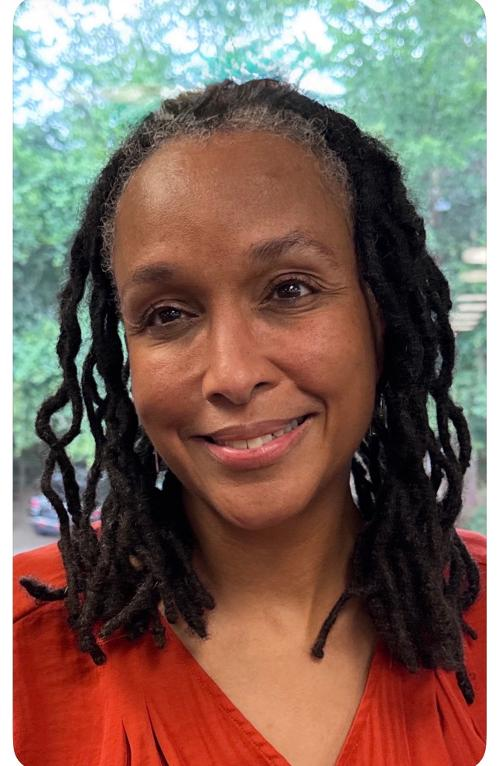
Smith at the Politics and Prose bookstore in Washington, D.C.. (2026)

Crystal Simone Smith is an American poet, scholar, and educator. She teaches academic writing at Duke University.

== Education ==
Born in Takoma Park, Maryland and educated in Prince George's County Schools, Smith relocated in her senior year of high school to North Carolina where she attended Bennett College and University of North Carolina at Greensboro. She completed a Master of Fine Arts in Creative Writing at Queens University of Charlotte in 2011.

== Career ==
Smith is a multifaceted poet who experiments across forms writing free verse, visual poetry, and Japanese forms with a central focus on the practice of haiku writing. Her work has appeared in POETRY Magazine,Rattle, Harper's Magazine, Frogpond, The Heron's Nest, and Modern Haiku.

In 2022, her collection of haiku, Ebbing Shore, won The Haiku Foundation Touchstone Distinguished Book Award. In the same year, poems from Runagate: Songs of the Freedom Bound were set to music by composer Shawn Okpebholo. The songset premiered at The Metropolitan Museum of Art and the subsequent contemporary classical album, Songs in Flight, was nominated for a Grammy Award in 2025.

Her publication Runagate: Songs of the Freedom Bound (Duke University Press) won the 2025 Roanoke-Chowan Poetry Award.

Smith is the 36th President of the Haiku Society of America; she was appointed in 2025.

== Works ==
- Ghost Woman: A Rising, 2027. Durham, NC: Duke University Press (forthcoming) ISBN 978-1478034087
- Common Sense, 2026. Boston, MA: Beacon Press/Penguin Random House. (forthcoming) ISBN 978-0807023389
- Runagate: Songs of the Freedom Bound, 2025. Durham, NC: Duke University Press. ISBN 978-1478031819
- Dark Testament, 2023. New York, NY: Henry Holt-MacMillan. ISBN 1250854369
- Ebbing Shore, 2022. Haiku. Durham, NC: Horse & Buggy Press. ISBN 978-1478031819
- Down To Earth, (chapbook) 2021. Longleaf Press. ISBN 978-1734398519
- Running Music, (chapbook) 2014. Longleaf Press. ISBN 978-0982929094
- Route's Home, (chapbook) 2013. Finishing Line Press. ISBN 978-1622293865

== Awards and honors ==
- Roanoke-Chowan Book Award, North Carolina Literary & Historical Association, 2025
- Durham Arts Council Artist Support Grant, 2025
- Arrowmont School of Arts & Crafts, Pentaculum Writing Residency, 2025
- The Children’s Book Council Notable Social Studies List Award, 2024
- Missouri Association of School Librarians’ Dogwood Reading List, 2024
- North Carolina Poetry Society Poetry of Courage Award, 2024
- The Haiku Foundation Touchstone Distinguish Book Award, 2022
- Duke University Humanities Unbounded Fellowship, 2020-2022
- North Carolina Poetry Society Bloodroot Haiku Award, 1st place, 2019
- Ashber Initiatives Literary Arts Grant Award, 2016
