= Alan Pizzarelli =

American writer

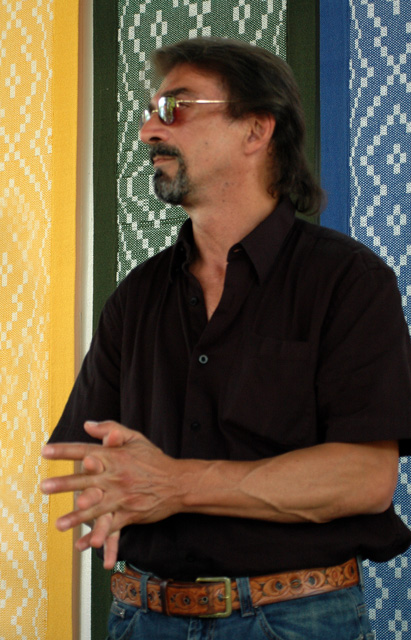
- Alan Pizzarelli at Baseball Haiku reading at Chautauqua Institution’s Hall of Philosophy, New York, 2008.
- Born: Alan Pizzarelli; January 12, 1950 (age 76); Newark, New Jersey
- Occupations: Poet, songwriter, musician
- Writing career
- Genres: Haiku, senryū

Alan Pizzarelli (born 1950) is an American poet, songwriter, and musician. He was born of an Italian-American family in Newark, New Jersey, and raised in the first ward’s Little Italy. He is a major figure in English-language haiku and Senryū.

== Poetry ==
Pizzarelli has performed numerous poetry readings and has taught poetry workshops in the US and internationally, including the International School of Lausanne, Switzerland, The Nick Virgilio Haiku Association in Camden, New Jersey, and The Newark Museum. From 2005 until 2009 he was senryū editor for the online poetry journal, Simply Haiku. He is co-producer and co-host of the podcast, Haiku Chronicles.

Tom Lynch writes of the following Pizzarelli haiku:

twilight
staples rust
in the telephone pole

"This last poem is as profound and literal an evocation of sabi, the incessant rusting of existence wrought by time, as exists in Western haiku."

== Works ==
=== Books ===
Pizzarelli is the author of 12 books of haiku and related poems including:

- The Flea Circus (Islet Books, 1989)
- City Beat (Islet Books, 1991)
- Senryū Magazine (River Willow, 2001)
- The Windswept Corner (Bottle Rockets Press, 2005)
- Frozen Socks (House of Haiku, 2015) ISBN 978-0-9626040-3-4
- Mind Zaps (House of Haiku, 2019) ISBN 978-0-9626040-4-1

=== Anthologies ===
Pizzarelli's poetry has appeared in many anthologies and books including:

- The Teachers & Writers Handbook of Poetic Forms (Teachers & Writers Collaborative, New York, 1987)
- The Haiku Handbook, William J. Higginson and Penny Harter (Kodansha, 1989)
- Haiku, edited by Czesław Miłosz (Wydawnictwo, Kraków Poland, 1992)
- Haiku Moment, edited by Bruce Ross (Charles E. Tuttle Company, 1993)
- Haiku World: An International Poetry Almanac, edited by W.J. Higginson (Kodansha International Ltd., 1996)
- Literature of Nature, An International Sourcebook, edited by Patrick D. Murphy (Fitzroy Dearborn Publishers, 1998)
- The Haiku Anthology, 3rd edition, edited by Cor van den Heuvel (W. W. Norton & Company, 2000)
- Stone Bench in an Empty Park, edited by Paul B. Janeczko (Orchard Books, 2000)
- The New Pond, edited by Emiko Miyashita (Hokumei-sha, Japan, 2002)
- How to Haiku, edited by Bruce Ross (Tuttle Publishing, 2002)
- Erotic Haiku, edited by Hiroaki Sato (IBC publisher, Japan, 2004)
- Kiss and Part, edited by Gail White (Doggerel Daze, 2005)
- Baseball Haiku, edited by Cor van den Heuvel (W. W. Norton & Company, 2007)
- Haiku on 42nd St.: A Celebration of Urban Poetry and Art (Clerisy Press, 2008)

Pizzarelli was a consultant for Jack Kerouac’s Book of Haikus, edited by Regina Weinreich (Penguin Poets, 2003)

=== Periodicals ===
Pizzarelli's poems and essays have appeared in numerous publications, such as:

- Longshot
- Simply Haiku: Essays, Modern Senryu and The Serious Side of Senryu
- The New York Times
- Tricycle: The Buddhist Review

== Electronic media ==
Pizzarelli has been featured on podcasts, radio, video and film:

- Haiku Chronicles, a podcast (co-producer and co-host)
- Chautauqua Institution’s Hall of Philosophy, June 26, 2008, FORA.tv video.
- The Jim Roselle Show, WJTN News Talk, June 26, 2008.
- Pizzarelli's haiku “the shoeshine boy” is featured in the documentary film, The Source (1999), about the Beat Generation.
