= Lucille Nixon =

American poet and school supervisor

Lucille M. Nixon (December 24, 1908 – December 22, 1963) was a poet and school supervisor from Palo Alto, California. In 1957 she became the first foreigner selected to participate in Utakai Hajime, the Imperial New Year's Poetry Reading of Japan. Nixon performed a 31 syllable waka about the Hōryū-ji, a Buddhist temple she had visited on a trip two years earlier. After her reading, she won the praises of Emperor Hirohito, who encouraged her to continue writing Japanese poetry so she could become a "bridge" between Japan and the United States.

== Bibliography ==
She authored a number of books. Among them are:

- The Choice is Always Ours: The Classic Anthology on the Spiritual Way, Dorothy B. Phillips (Editor), Lucille M. Nixon (Editor), Elizabeth B. Howes (Editor)
- Sounds from the unknown; a collection of Japanese-American tanka, Lucille M. Nixon (Editor), Tomoe Tana
- Young ranchers at Oak Valley
- Living in Japan

== Death and legacy ==
Nixon died in 1963. An elementary school in Palo Alto currently bears her name.
