= Elizabeth Searle Lamb =

American poet

Elizabeth S. Lamb
- Born: January 22, 1917; Topeka, Kansas
- Died: February 16, 2005 (aged 88); Santa Fe, New Mexico
- Education: University of Kansas

Elizabeth Searle Lamb (January 22, 1917 – February 16, 2005) was an American poet. She is known for writing English-language haiku. Raymond Roseliep called her the "First Lady of American haiku". Her work has been translated into other languages.

== Biography ==
She was born in Topeka, Kansas. She attended the University of Kansas and studied music and, in particular, she played the harp. She married F. Bruce Lamb in Trinidad in 1941. They lived in several places in South America due to her husband's job as a forester. They moved to New York in 1961.

She served as president of the Haiku Society of America in 1971.

She died in 2015 in Santa Fe, New Mexico.

== Honors and awards ==
She was the honorary curator for the American Haiku Archives in the California State Library in Sacramento from 1996 to 1998.

== Bibliography ==
- The pelican tree, and other Panama adventures, 1953
- Today and every day, 1970
- 39 Blossoms, 1982
- Across the windharp: collected and new haiku, 1999
