= Makoto Ueda (poetry critic) =

Japanese literary critic (1931–2020)

Makoto Ueda (上田 真, Ueda Makoto; 1931 – August 19, 2020) was a professor emeritus of Japanese literature at Stanford University. Ueda won the Japan–U.S. Friendship Commission Prize for the Translation of Japanese Literature in 1996 for his translated anthology Modern Japanese Tanka (Columbia University Press, 1996).

== Education and career ==
He earned a Ph.D. in comparative literature in 1961.

In 2004–2005 he served as the honorary curator of the American Haiku Archives at the California State Library in Sacramento, California. He was given that honor "in recognition of Ueda’s many decades of academic writing about haiku and related genres and his leading translations of Japanese haiku." The library added that "Ueda has been our most consistently useful source for information on Japanese haiku, as well as our finest source for the poems in translation, from Bashô to the present day." His work on female poets and 20th century poets "had an enormous impact".

== Bibliography ==
He is an author of numerous books about Japanese literature and in particular Haiku, Senryū, Tanka, and Japanese poetics.

- The Old Pine Tree (1962)
- Literary and Art Theories in Japan (1967)
- Matsuo Bashō: The Master Haiku Poet (1970)
- Modern Japanese Haiku, an Anthology (1976)
- Modern Japanese Writers and the Nature of Literature (1976)
- Explorations: Essays in Comparative Literature (1986)
- Bashō and His Interpreters: Selected Hokku With Commentary (1992)
- Modern Japanese Tanka (1996)
- Modern Japanese Writers and the Nature of Literature (1996)
- The Path of Flowering Thorn: The Life and Poetry of Yosa Buson (1998).
- Light Verse from the Floating World: An Anthology of Premodern Japanese Senryu (2000)
- Far Beyond the Field: Haiku by Japanese Women (2003)
- Dew on the Grass: The Life and Poetry of Kobayashi Issa (2004)
- Mother of Dreams: Portrayals of Women in Modern Japanese Fiction (2004)
