= Mosaic Press =

Canadian publishing company

- Founded: 1975; 51 years ago
- Founders: Howard Aster; Mike Walsh
- Country of origin: Canada
- Headquarters location: Oakville, Ontario
- Publication types: Books
- Official website: mosaicpress.ca

Mosaic Press is an independent Canadian publishing company based in Oakville, Ontario.

== History ==
The precursor to Mosaic Press, Valley Editions, was founded in 1973 with the Canadian poet and literary professor Seymour Mayne as literary editor. The company was created following the closure of Ingluvin Press in Montreal, with Valley producing Ingluvin's remaining unpublished titles in 1974. Mosaic Press was founded in 1975 by Howard Aster and Mike Walsh, initially as a separate company to Valley Editions. The two companies published a total of 16 titles that year. The first book published by Mosaic Press was Current Soviet Leaders, a scholarly work regarding leaders of the USSR. Mosaic Press and Valley Editions published distinctly differing materials, with Mosaic publishing primarily ethnic and scholarly works, and Valley publishing creative writing. In 1976, the two companies began publishing books under a single imprint, Valley Editions-Mosaic Press.

In 1986, Mosaic Press led a literary delegation to China, becoming the first Canadian publisher ever to visit China for the purpose of lecturing on the Canadian publishing industry. While in China, Mike Walsh worked to establish stronger ties between Mosaic and China's International Book Trading Corporation, as well as the China Import Centre. Mosaic Press was at the time the only Canadian publishing agent for Panda Books, a state-owned Chinese publishing company.

Mosaic Press has published several works of Irving Layton, a Canadian poet who was nominated for the Nobel Prize in Literature in 1981.
