= Senryū =

Form of short, comedic, Japanese poetry

Senryū (川柳) is a Japanese form of short poetry similar to haiku in construction: three lines with 17 morae (or on, often translated as syllables, but see the article on onji for distinctions). Senryū tend to be about human foibles while haiku tend to be about nature, and senryū are often cynical or darkly humorous while haiku are more serious.

Like haiku, senryū originated as an opening part (hokku) of a larger Japanese poem called renga. Unlike haiku, senryū do not include a kireji (cutting word), and do not generally include a kigo, or season word.

== Form and content ==
Senryū is named after Edo period haikai poet Karai Senryū (柄井川柳; 1718–1790). A typical example from the collection:

泥棒を
捕えてみれば
我が子なり

dorobō o
toraete mireba
wagako nari

When I catch,
The robber,
my own son

This senryū, which can also be translated "Catching him / I see the robber / is my son," is not so much a personal experience of the author as an example of a type of situation (provided by a short comment called a maeku or fore-verse, which usually prefaces a number of examples) and/or a brief or witty rendition of an incident from history or the arts (plays, songs, tales, poetry, etc.).

かくれんぼ
三つ数えて
冬になる

kakurenbo
mittsu kazoete
fuyu ni naru

Hide and seek
Count to three
Winter comes

== Senryū in the United States ==
The first senryū circle in the United States was reportedly started by Japanese immigrants in Yakima, Washington, during the early 1900s. Over time, other senryū circles were established in Seattle and other Japanese communities in the Pacific Northwest. In 1938, the Los Angeles–based Kashu Mainichi Shimbun published its first senryū section.

During the incarceration of Japanese Americans during World War II, senryū was a popular activity in the camps.

=== English-language senryū publications ===
In the 1970s, Michael McClintock edited Seer Ox: American Senryu Magazine. In 1993, Michael Dylan Welch edited and published Fig Newtons: Senryū to Go, the first anthology of English-language senryū.

- Prune Juice, a journal of senryū and kyoka, is edited by Aaron Barry, Antoinette Cheung, and P. H. Fischer.
- Failed Haiku is edited by Bryan Rickert and Hemapriya Chellappan.
- Simply Haiku archives (final publication in 2009) contain a regular senryū column edited by Alan Pizzarelli.

Additionally, one can regularly find senryū and related articles in some haiku publications. For example, the World Haiku Review has regularly published senryū. Senryū regularly appear or appeared in the pages of Modern Haiku, Frogpond, Bottle Rockets, Woodnotes, Tundra, Haiku Canada Review, Presence, Blithe Spirit, Kingfisher, and other haiku journals, often unsegregated from haiku.

=== American Senryū awards ===
The Haiku Society of America holds the annual Gerald Brady Memorial Award for best unpublished senryū.

Previous Winners of the Gerald Brady Memorial Award include:

- 1988: Frederick Gasser
- 1989: Brenda S. Duster
- 1990: John Thompson
- 1991: Leatrice Lifshitz
- 1992: Christopher Herold
- 1993: Tom Clausen
- 1994: David Carmel Gershator
- 1995: Michael Dylan Welch
- 1996: Sandra Fuhringer
- 1997: John Stevenson
- 1998: Carl Patrick
- 1999: Leatrice Lifshitz
- 2000: Yvonnne Hardenbrook
- 2001: Billie Wilson
- 2002: w. f. owen
- 2003: w. f. owen
- 2004: John Stevenson
- 2005: Emily Romano
- 2006: Roberta Beary
- 2007: Scott Mason
- 2008: David P. Grayson
- 2009: Barry George
- 2010: Garry Gay
- 2011: Ernest J. Berry
- 2012: Julie Warther
- 2013: Peter Newton
- 2014: Neal Whitman
- 2015: paul m.
- 2016: Tom Painting
- 2017: Sam Bateman
- 2018: Joshua Gage
- 2019: PMF Johnson
- 2020: Tony Williams
- 2021: Amy Losak
- 2022: Joshua St. Claire
- 2023: John Savoie
- 2024: Brad Bennett
- 2025: Matthew Markworth

Since about 1990, the Haiku Poets of Northern California has been running a senryū contest, as part of its San Francisco International Haiku and Senryu Contest.

== See also ==
- Zappai

== Bibliography and further reading ==
- J C Brown, Senryu: Poems of the People, Simon & Schuster Ltd, 1991, ISBN 978-0-8048-1664-9
- R. H. Blyth, translator, Senryu: Japanese Satirical Verses. 1949, The Hokuseido Press, ISBN 0-8371-2958-3. Includes black and white sketches and some colored plates
- R. H. Blyth, translator, Japanese Humour. 1957, Japan Travel Bureau
- R. H. Blyth, translator, Japanese Life and Character in Senryu. 1960, The Hokuseido Press
- R. H. Blyth, translator, Oriental Humour. 1960, The Hokuseido Press
- R. H. Blyth, translator, Edo Satirical Verse Anthologies. 1961, The Hokuseido Press
- Robin D. Gill, compiler and translator, Octopussy, Dry Kidney & Blue Spots – dirty themes from 18-19c Japanese poems, Paraverse Press, 2007. ISBN 978-0-9742618-5-0. Chronicles 1,300 senryū – Blyth mentioned that he could only introduce what the censors allowed; these are the type of senryū that were not allowed.
- Lorraine Ellis Harr (tombo), Selected Senryu. 1976, J & C Transcripts. One of the earliest English-language senryū-only publications
- James Day Hodgson, American Senryu. 1992, The Japan Times, ISBN 4-7890-0661-1
- Howard S. Levy and Junko Ohsawa, One Hundred Senryu Selections. 1979, So. Pasadena, CA, Langstaff Publications, ISBN 0-686-37532-7
- Alan Pizzarelli, Senryu Magazine. 2001, River Willow. Although this book looks like a regular journal, it is the effort of Alan Pizzarelli only, done as a parody of haiku journals.
- Makoto Ueda, Light Verse from the Floating World: An Anthology of Premodern Japanese Senryu, Columbia University Press, 1999. ISBN 0-231-11550-4 cloth ISBN 0-231-11551-2
- Michael Dylan Welch, ed. Fig Newtons: Senryu to Go, Press Here, 1993 (the first anthology of English-language senryū)
