= Haiku Society of America =

Organization for English language haiku

- Formation: 1968
- Type: Poetry society
- Location: United States of America
- Members: Haiku poets and enthusiasts from any part of the world
- Official language: English
- President: Crystal Simone Smith
- Website: www.hsa-haiku.org

The Haiku Society of America is a non-profit organization composed of haiku poets, editors, critics, publishers and enthusiasts that promotes the composition and appreciation of haiku in English. Founded in 1968, it is the largest society dedicated to haiku and related forms of poetry outside Japan, and holds meetings, lectures, workshops, readings, and contests, throughout the United States. The society's journal, Frogpond, first published in 1978, appears three times a year. As of 2022, the HSA has over 1,000 members.

== Activities ==
The HSA web site includes information on how to get involved with its regional chapters, as well as information on contests, society meetings, and publications including Frogpond. The society also publishes a monthly email newsletter with news on regional, national, and international haiku events. The Haiku Society of America is well known for its annual contests for haiku, senryū, haibun, renku, and renga, as well as the Merit Book Awards for the best haiku books published each year.

== History ==
The Haiku Society of America was founded in 1968 by Harold G. Henderson and Leroy Kanterman in New York City, and was the first formal organization dedicated to haiku outside of Japan. Twenty-one charter members attended its first meeting. Bringing together poets study, discuss, and write haiku, the organization's stated goals were to:

- promote the creation and appreciation of haiku and related forms (haibun, haiga, renku, senryū, sequences, and tanka) among its members and the public
- foster association, friendship, communication and mutual support among haiku poets in the United States and around the world

Early members included Nicholas A. Virgilio, Elizabeth Searle Lamb, L.A. Davidson (Laura Agnes), Virginia Brady Young, Alan Pizzarelli, and Anita Virgil. American poet Cor van den Heuvel first attended a meeting in 1971. Annual readings and lectures featured translators such as Cid Corman, Donald Keene, and Hiroaki Sato, as well as speakers from Japan including scholar Kenkichi Yamamoto, and haiku poet Sumio Mori. For a period, the official magazine of the society was called Haiku West, and was edited by Leroy Kanterman.

In the early 1970s, the Haiku Society of America formed a committee to agree on a definition of haiku, which they submitted to the publishers of several English dictionaries, and became the first widely accepted definition, which has continued to be revised over the years. In 1975, HSA held sessions focusing on renga, and published the 36-verse kasen format in its newsletter. By 1989, the society had a few hundred members located throughout North America, Europe, and Japan, and was publishing a quarterly magazine, with no paid staff.

In 1994, the society produced A Haiku Path, an important work documenting the history of Western haiku. Frogpond was one of the two most prominent haiku journals, along with Modern Haiku, and many poets were published in both.

In 1996 and 1997, the Haiku Society of America and the Haiku International Association held reciprocal conferences in Chicago and Tokyo. By 1997, HSA membership had grown to 700, having more than doubled in the space of 12 years.

Since 1993, the society has published an annual membership anthology.

== Past presidents ==
From 1979 to 1981, Hiroaki Sato, a translator of Japanese poetry into English, served as president. Other past presidents have included poet, historian, and editor Elizabeth Searle Lamb; poet Cor van den Heuvel; poet Lee Gurga, a translator of contemporary Japanese poets and editor of Modern Haiku; and John Stevenson, who was also an editor of Frogpond.

== See also ==
- British Haiku Society
- Haiku
- Haiku in English
- Matsuo Basho
