= Labour Day =

Annual holiday to celebrate the achievements of workers

Nations and dependencies coloured by observance of International Workers' Day or a different variant of May Day or Labour Day: Labour Day falls on 1 May Another public holiday on 1 May No public holiday on 1 May, but Labour Day on a different date No public holiday on 1 May and no Labour Day

Labour Day (or Labor Day) is an official public holiday in many countries. In most countries, Labour Day is synonymous with, or linked with, International Workers' Day, which happens on 1 May. It was originally chosen to commemorate the 1886 general strike which culminated in the Haymarket affair. In the United States and in Canada, it is a public holiday on the first Monday in September.

Labour Day is a public / statutory holiday. It is an annual day of celebration of the labour movement and the institution of achievements. It has its origins in the labour union movement, specifically the eight-hour day movement, which advocated eight hours for work, eight hours for recreation, and eight hours for rest.

== International Workers' Day ==
International Workers' Day
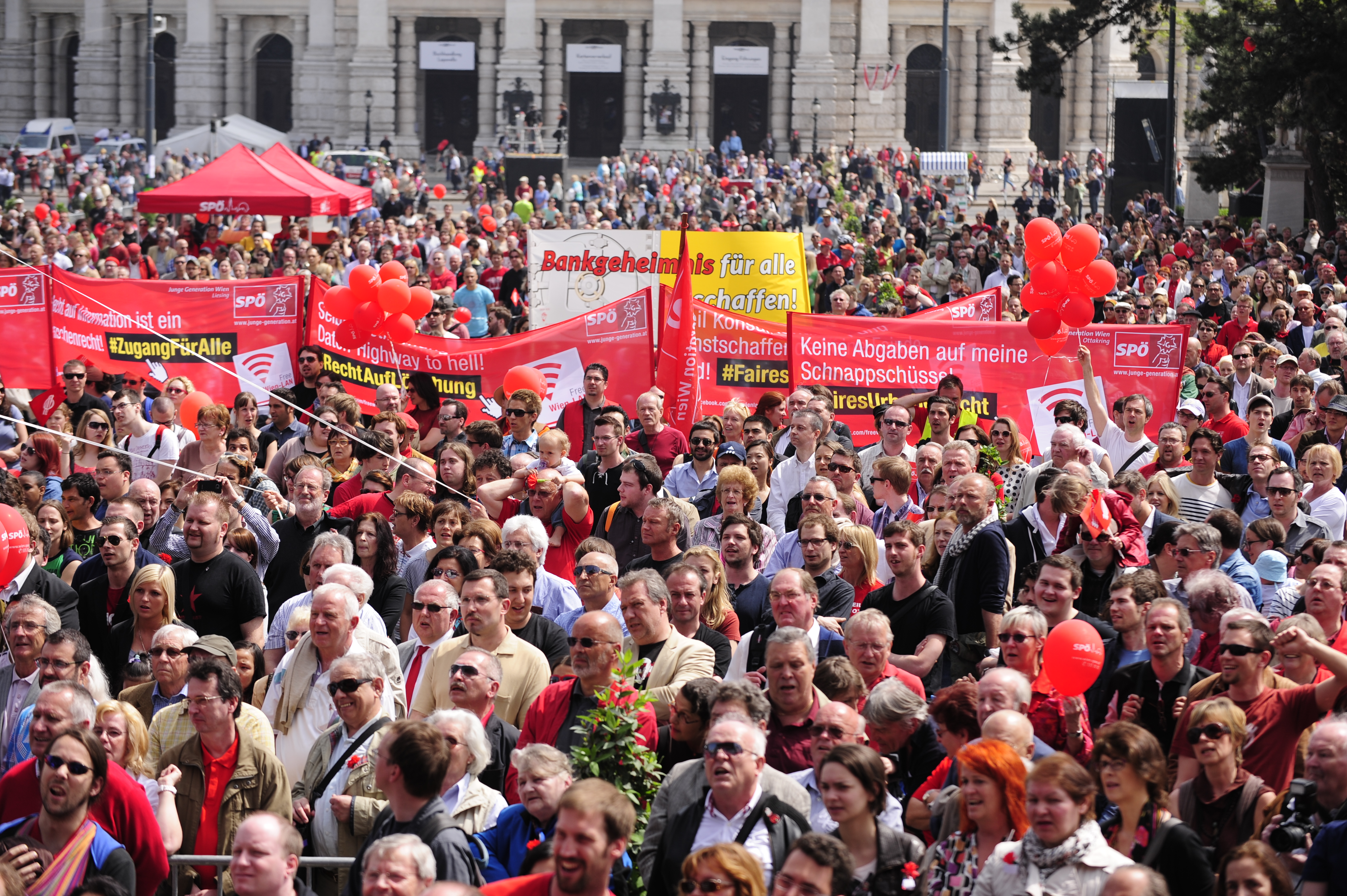
- 2013 International Workers' Day demonstration in Austria
- Official name: International Workers' Day
- Also called: Labour Day; May Day
- Type: International (95 countries)
- Significance: Commemorate the Haymarket affair in Chicago, 1886
- Celebrations: Various, depending on the country; mostly parades, marches, barbecues
- Date: 1 May, or First Monday in May
- Frequency: Annual
- First time: 1 May 1890 (136 years, 201 days)
- Related to: Labor Day (United States); Labour Day (Canada); Labor Thanksgiving Day (Japan)

International Workers' Day, also called Labour Day in some countries and often referred to as May Day, is a celebration of labourers, the labour movement and the working class that is marked every year on 1 May, or the first Monday in May.

Traditionally, 1 May is the date of the European spring festival of May Day. The International Workers Congress held in Paris in 1889 established the Second International for labor, socialist, and Marxist parties. It adopted a resolution for a "great international demonstration" in support of working-class demands for the eight-hour day. The date was chosen by the American Federation of Labor to commemorate a general strike in the United States, which had begun on 1 May 1886 and culminated in the Haymarket affair on 4 May. The demonstration subsequently became a yearly event. The 1904 Sixth Conference of the Second International, called on "all Social Democratic Party organisations and trade unions of all countries to demonstrate energetically on the First of May for the legal establishment of the eight-hour day, for the class demands of the proletariat, and for universal peace".

The 1st of May, or first Monday in May, is a national public holiday in many countries, in most cases known as "International Workers' Day" or a similar name. Some countries celebrate a Labour Day on other dates significant to them, such as the United States and Canada, which celebrate Labor Day on the first Monday of September. In 1955, the Catholic Church dedicated 1 May to "Saint Joseph the Worker". Replacing another feast of St. Joseph, this date was chosen by Pope Pius XII in 1955 as a counterpoint to the communist International Workers' Day celebrations on May Day. Saint Joseph is the patron saint of workers and craftsmen, among others.

== Origin ==
Labor celebration days have existed in some European countries since the end of the 18th century – sometimes on January 20th (France, 1793) or on June 5th (France, 1867).

On 21 April 1856, Australian stonemasons in Victoria undertook a mass stoppage as part of the eight-hour workday movement. It became a yearly commemoration, inspiring American workers to have their first stoppage. 1 May was chosen to be International Workers' Day to commemorate the 1886 Haymarket affair in Chicago. In that year beginning on 1 May, there was a general strike for the eight-hour workday. On 4 May, the police acted to disperse a public assembly in support of the strike when an unidentified person threw a bomb. The police responded by firing on the workers. The event led to the deaths of seven police officers and at least four civilians; sixty police officers were injured, as were one hundred and fifteen civilians. Hundreds of labour leaders and sympathizers were later rounded-up and four were executed by hanging, after a trial that was seen as a miscarriage of justice. (Note: I saw a man, whom I afterwards identified as Fielding [sic], standing on a truck wagon at the corner of what is known as Crane's Alley. I raised my baton and, in a loud voice, ordered them to disperse as peaceable citizens. I also called upon three persons in the crowd to assist in dispersing the mob. Fielding got down from the wagon, saying at the time, "We are peaceable," as he uttered the last word, I heard a terrible explosion behind where I was standing, followed almost instantly by an irregular volley of pistol shots in our front and from the sidewalk on the east side of the street, which was immediately followed by regular and well directed volleys from the police and which was kept up for several minutes. I then ordered the injured men brought to the stations and sent for surgeons to attend to their injuries. After receiving the necessary attention most of the injured officers were removed to the County Hospital and I highly appreciate the manner in which they were received by Warden McGarrigle who did all in his power to make them comfortable as possible.) The following day on 5 May, in Milwaukee, Wisconsin, the state militia fired on a crowd of strikers killing seven, including a schoolboy and a man feeding chickens in his yard.

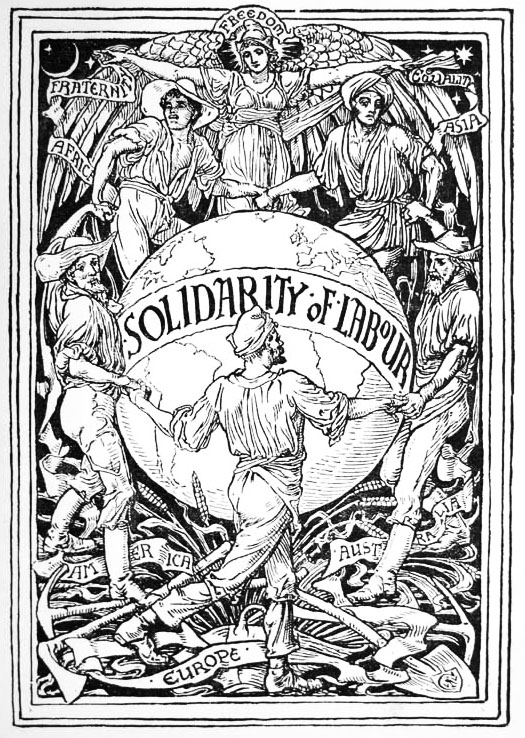
1889 design by Walter Crane celebrating International Workers' Day

In 1889, the first meeting of the Second International was held in Paris, following a proposal by Raymond Lavigne that called for international demonstrations on the 1890 anniversary of the Chicago protests. On 1 May 1890, demonstrations took place in the United States and most countries in Europe. Demonstrations were also held in Chile and Peru. May Day was formally recognized as an annual event at the International's second congress in 1891. Subsequently, the May Day riots of 1894 occurred. The International Socialist Congress, Amsterdam 1904 called on "all Social Democratic Party organisations and trade unions of all countries to demonstrate energetically on the First of May for the legal establishment of the 8-hour day, for the class demands of the proletariat, and for universal peace." The congress made it "mandatory upon the proletarian organisations of all countries to stop work on 1 May, wherever it is possible without injury to the workers."

In the United States and Canada, a September holiday, called Labor or Labour Day, was first proposed in the 1880s. In 1882, Matthew Maguire, a machinist, first proposed a Labor Day holiday on the first Monday of September (Note: "In 1884 the first Monday in September was selected as the holiday, as originally proposed") while serving as secretary of the Central Labor Union (CLU) of New York. Others argue that it was first proposed by Peter J. McGuire of the American Federation of Labor in May 1882, after witnessing the annual labour festival held in Toronto, Canada. In 1887, Oregon was the first state of the United States to make it an official public holiday. By the time it became an official federal holiday in 1894, thirty US states officially celebrated Labor Day. Thus by 1887 in North America, Labour Day was an established, official holiday but in September, not on 1 May.

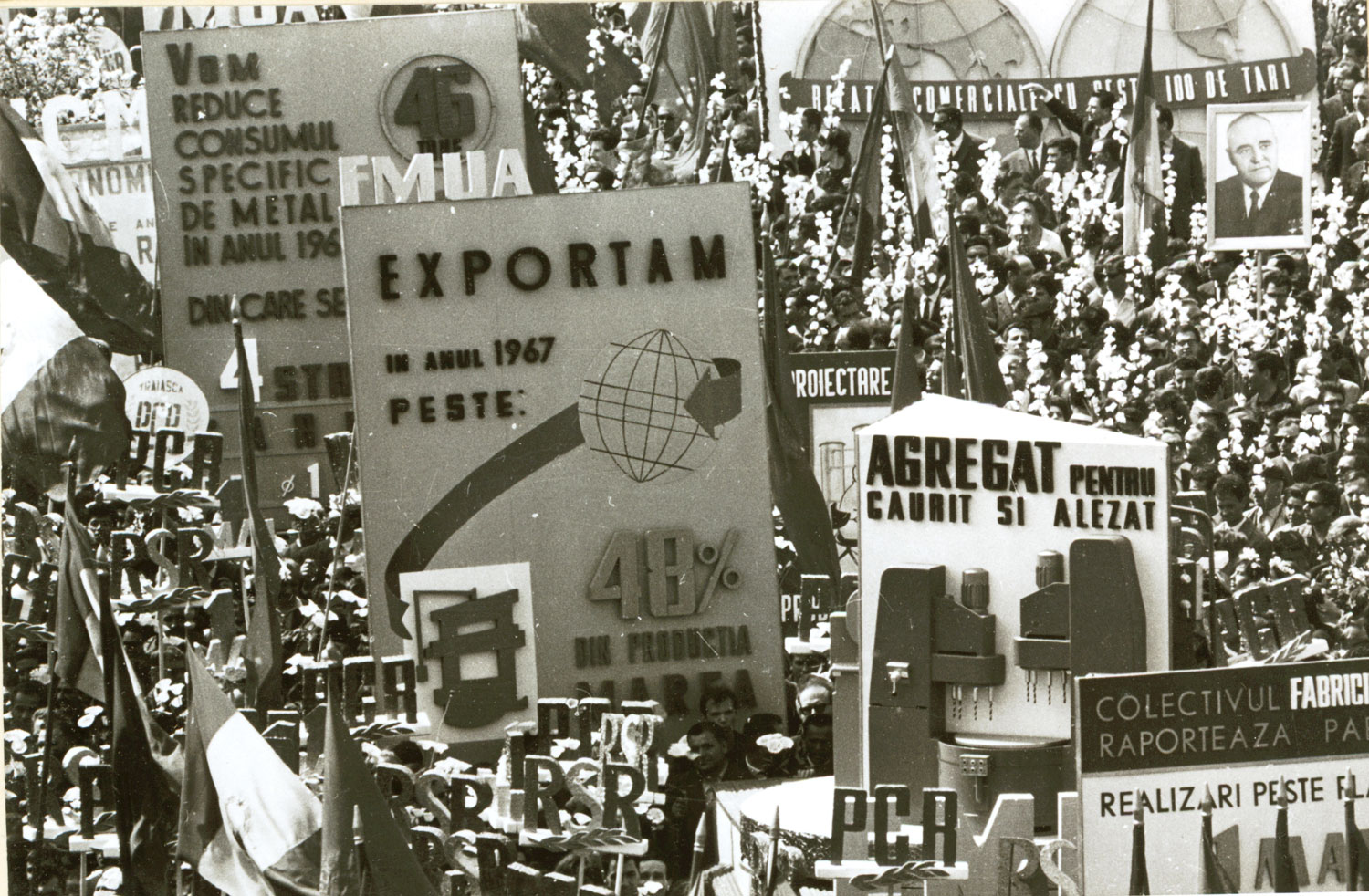
A 1 May rally in Bucharest, Romania, 1967

May Day has also been a focal point for demonstrations by various socialist, communist and anarchist groups since the Second International. It is one of the most important holidays in communist countries such as China, Vietnam, Cuba, Laos, North Korea, and the former Soviet Union countries. Celebrations in these countries typically feature elaborate workforce parades, including displays of military hardware and soldiers.

In 1955, the Catholic Church dedicated 1 May to "Saint Joseph the Worker". Saint Joseph is the patron saint of workers and craftsmen, among others.

Today, the majority of countries around the world celebrate a workers' day on 1 May.

=== Soviet Union and Eastern Bloc under socialist governments ===
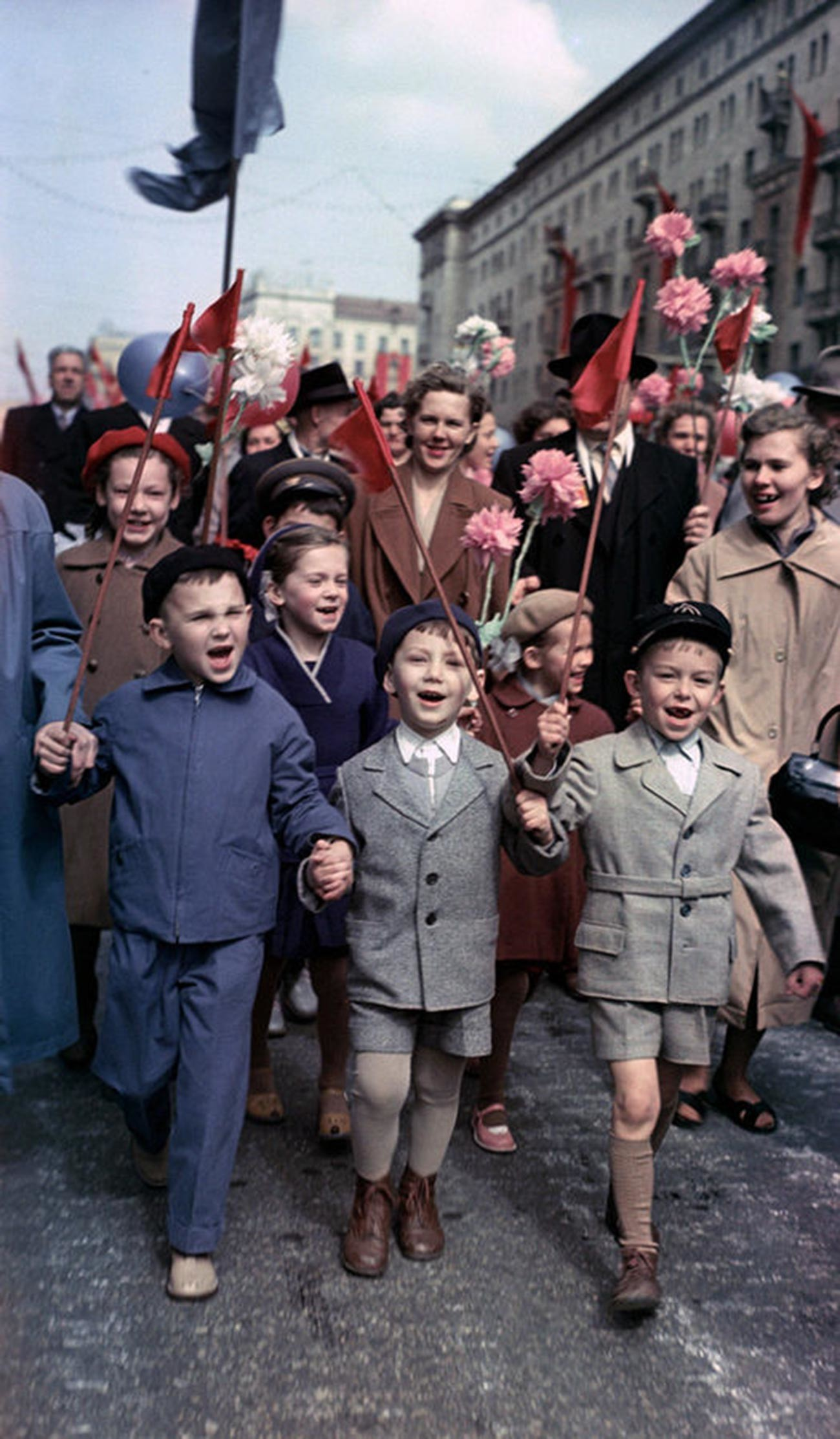
May Day rally in Moscow, Soviet Union, 1960

Eastern Bloc countries such as the Soviet Union and most countries of central and eastern Europe that were under the rule of Marxist–Leninist governments held official Workers' Day celebrations in every town and city, during which party leaders greeted the crowds. Workers carried banners with political slogans and many companies decorated their company cars. The biggest celebration of 1 May usually occurred in the capital of a particular socialist country and usually included a military display and the presence of the president and the secretary general of the party. During the Cold War, May Day became the occasion for large military parades in Red Square by the Soviet Union and attended by the top leaders of the Kremlin, especially the Politburo, atop Lenin's Mausoleum. It became an enduring symbol of that period. In Poland, since 1982, party leaders led the official parades. In Hungary, May Day was officially celebrated under the communist rule, and remains a public holiday. Traditionally, the day was marked by dancing around designated "May trees". Some factories in socialist countries were named in honour of International Workers' Day, such as 1 Maja Coal Mine in Wodzisław Śląski, Poland. In East Germany, the holiday was officially known as Internationaler Kampf- und Feiertag der Werktätigen für Frieden und Sozialismus ("International Day of the Struggle and Celebration of the Workers for Peace and Socialism"); similar names were used in other Eastern Bloc countries.

== By country ==
=== Africa ===
==== Algeria ====
In Algeria, 1 May is a public holiday celebrated as Worker's Day.

==== Angola ====
1 May is recognized as public holiday in Angola and called Workers' Day.

==== Egypt ====
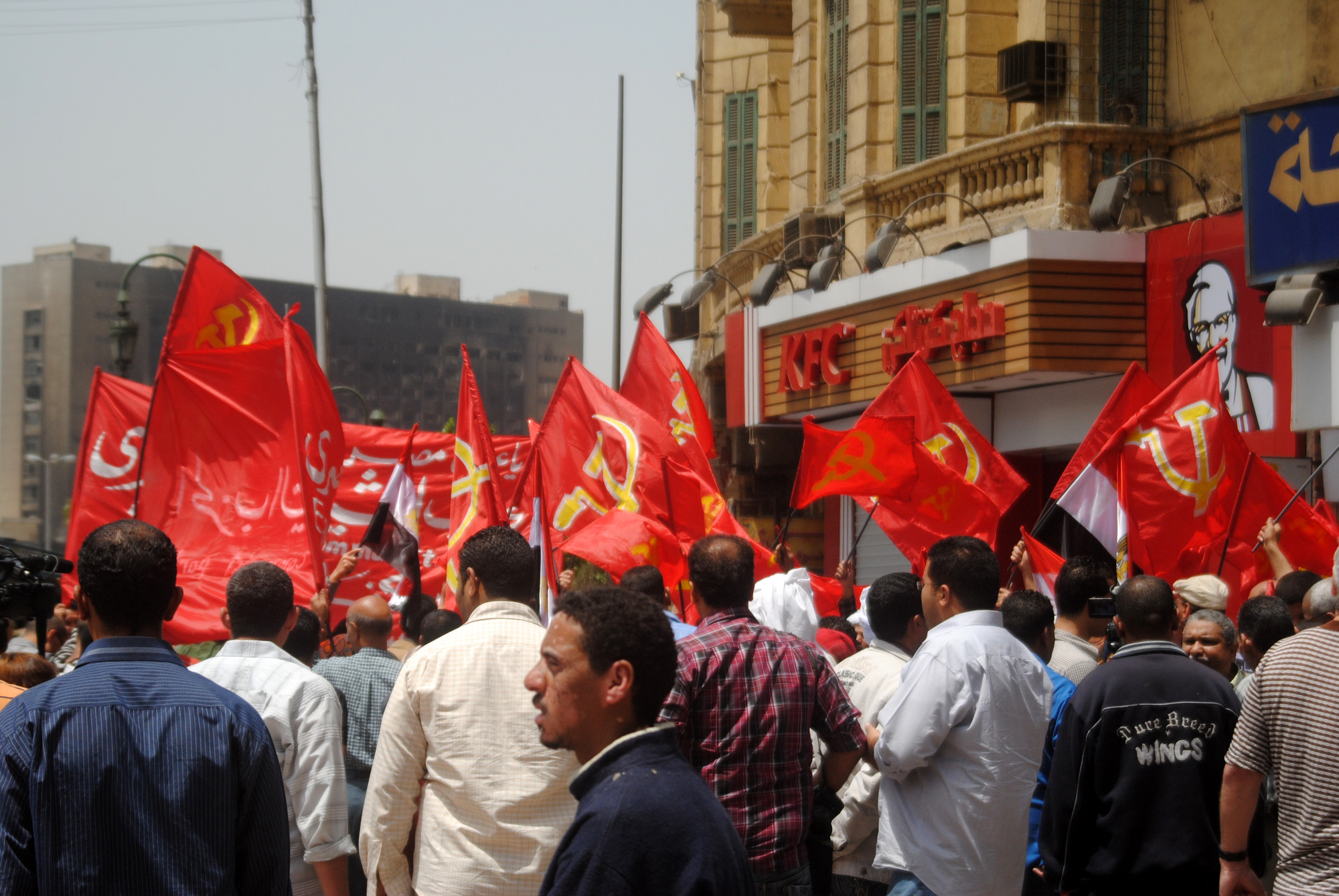
Egyptian Communist Party flags in Tahrir Square

In Egypt, 1 May is known as Labour Day and is considered a paid holiday. The President of Egypt traditionally presides over the celebrations.

==== Ethiopia ====
In Ethiopia, 1 May is a public holiday and celebrated as Worker's Day. May day was most often celebrated under the previous government of the Derg and the People's Democratic Republic of Ethiopia.

==== Ghana ====
1 May is a holiday in Ghana. It is a day to celebrate all workers across the country. It is celebrated with a parade by trade unions and labour associations. The parades are normally addressed by the Secretary General of the trade union congress and by regional secretaries in the regions. Workers from different workplaces through banners and T-shirts identify their companies.

==== Kenya ====
In Kenya, 1 May is a public holiday and celebrated as Labour Day. It is a big day addressed by the leaders of the workers' umbrella union body – the Central Organization of Trade Unions (COTU). The Cabinet Secretary in charge of Ministry of Labour and Social Protection (and occasionally the president) address the workers. Each year, the government approves (and increases) the minimum wage on Labour Day.

==== Libya ====
In Libya, International Workers' Day was declared a national public holiday by the National Transitional Council in 2012 the first year of the post-Qaddafi era. On 1 May 1978, then Libyan leader Colonel Mu'ammar Al-Qaddafi addressed the nation in the capital city of Tripoli calling for administrative and also economic reforms across Libya.

==== Mauritius ====
In Mauritius, 1 May is a public holiday celebrated as Labour Day. It was celebrated for the first time in Mauritius on 1 May 1938, and for the first time as an official public holiday on 1 May 1950. This was thanks largely to the efforts of Guy Rozemont, Dr. Maurice Curé, Pandit Sahadeo and Emmanuel Anquetil, as a day of special significance for Mauritian workers who for many years had struggled for their social, political and economic rights.

==== Morocco ====
In Morocco, 1 May is recognized as a public holiday.

==== Mozambique ====
Mozambique celebrates International Workers' Day on 1 May.

==== Namibia ====
1 May is recognized as public holiday in Namibia and celebrated as Workers' Day.

==== Nigeria ====
Since 1981, 1 May is a public holiday in Nigeria. On the day, people gather while, traditionally, the president of the Nigeria Labour Congress and other politicians address workers.

==== Somalia ====
In Somalia, 1 May is a public holiday and celebrated as Labour Day.

==== South Africa ====
In South Africa, Workers' Day has been celebrated as a national public holiday on 1 May each year since 1995. Workers' Day started to get more attention by African workers in 1928, which saw thousands of workers in a mass march. In 1950, the South African Communist Party called for a strike on 1 May in response to the Suppression of Communism Act declaring it illegal. Police violence caused the death of 18 people across Soweto. It has its origins within the historical struggles of workers and their trade unions internationally for solidarity between working people in their struggles to win fair employment standards and more importantly, to establish a culture of human and worker rights and to ensure that these are enshrined in international law and the national law.

In 1986, the hundredth anniversary of the Haymarket affair, the Congress of South African Trade Unions (COSATU) called for the government to establish an official holiday on 1 May. It also called for workers to stay home from work that day. COSATU was joined by a number of prominent anti-apartheid organizations, including the National Education Crisis Committee and the United Democratic Front (South Africa). The call was also supported by a number of organizations regarded as conservative, such as the African Teachers' Association of South Africa, the National African Federated Chamber of Commerce, and the Steel and Engineering Industries Federation of South Africa, an organization that represented employers in the metal industries. More than 1,500,000 workers observed the call and stayed home, as did thousands of students, taxi drivers, vendors, shopkeepers, domestic workers, and self-employed people. In the following years, 1 May became a popular, if not official, holiday. As a result of the killings on 1 May 1950 and the success of COSATU's call in 1986, 1 May became associated with resistance to the apartheid government. After its first universal election in 1994, 1 May was adopted as a public holiday, celebrated for the first time in 1995. On its website, the city of Durban states that the holiday "celebrate[s] the role played by trade unions and other labour movements in the fight against South Africa's apartheid regime".

==== Tanzania ====
In Tanzania, it is a public holiday on 1 May and celebrated as Worker's Day.

==== Tunisia ====
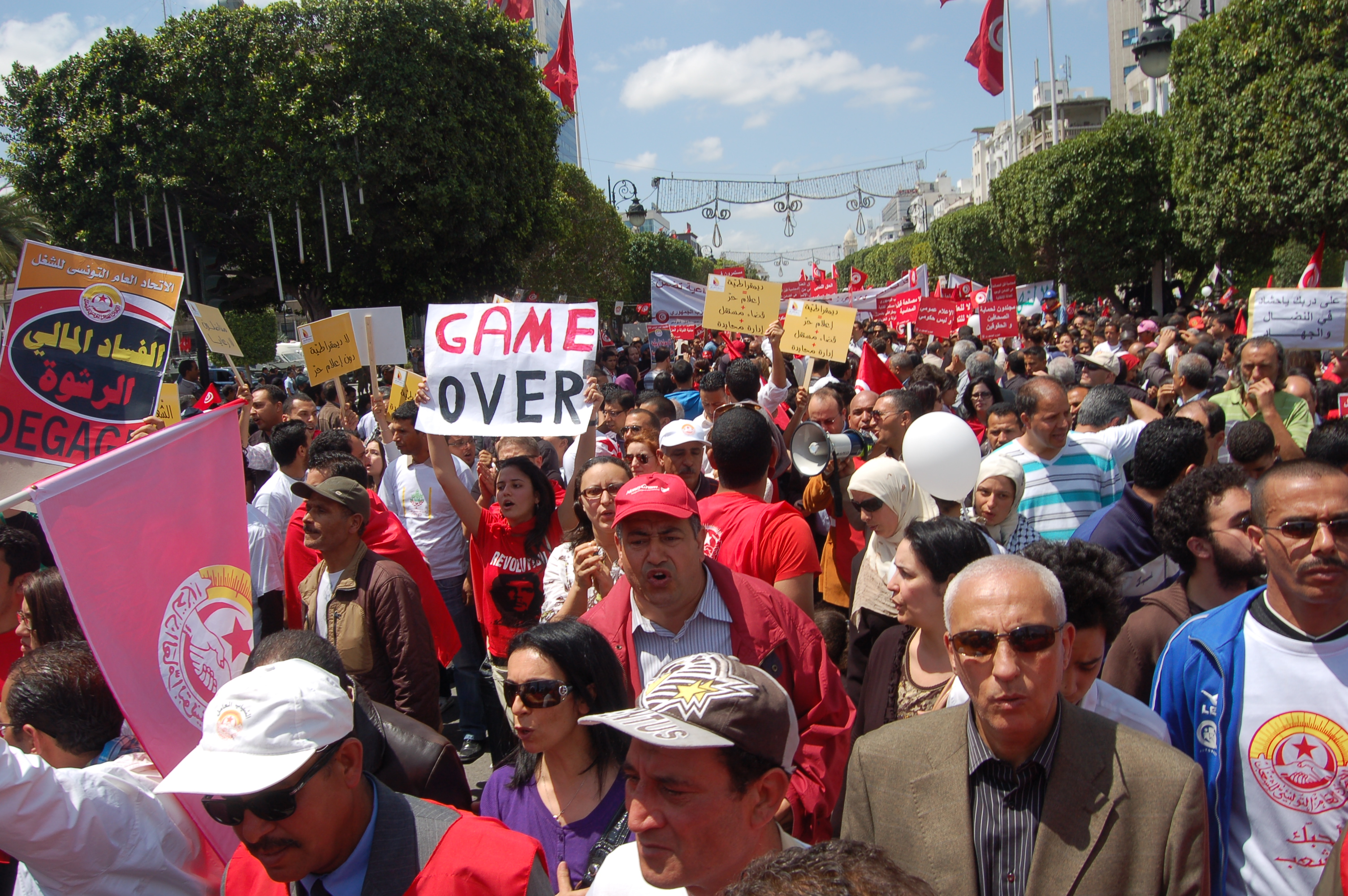
Labour Day rally in Tunis, Tunisia

1 May is recognized as Labour Day in Tunisia, and is a paid public holiday.

==== Uganda ====
In Uganda, Labour Day is a public holiday on 1 May.

==== Zimbabwe ====
1 May is recognized as a public holiday in Zimbabwe and called Workers' Day.

=== Americas ===
==== Antigua and Barbuda ====
In Antigua and Barbuda, Labour Day is a public holiday on the first Monday in May.

==== Argentina ====
In Argentina, Workers' Day is an official holiday on 1 May, and is frequently associated with labour unions. Celebrations related to labour are held including demonstrations in major cities. The first Workers' Day celebration was in 1890, when Argentinian unions organized several celebrations in Buenos Aires and other cities, at the same time that the international labour movement celebrated it for the first time. In 1930, it was established as an official holiday by the Radical Civic Union president Hipólito Yrigoyen. The day became particularly significant during the worker-oriented government of Juan Domingo Perón (1946–55). He permitted and endorsed national recognition of the holiday during his tenure in office.

==== The Bahamas ====
Labour Day is a national holiday in The Bahamas, celebrated on the first Friday in June in order to create a long weekend for workers. The traditional date of Labour Day in The Bahamas, however, is 7 June, in commemoration of a significant workers' strike that began on that day in 1942.

Labour Day is meant to honour and celebrate workers and the importance of their contributions to the nation and society. In the capital city, Nassau, thousands of people come to watch a parade through the streets, which begins at mid-morning. Bands in colourful uniforms, traditional African Junkanoo performers, and members of various labour unions and political parties are all part of the procession, which ends at the Southern Recreation Grounds, where government officials make speeches for the occasion.

==== Barbados ====
In Barbados, May Day is a public holiday celebrated on 1 May.

==== Bolivia ====
1 May is known as Labour Day and is a holiday. By custom, it is usually the day on which wage increases (e.g., the national minimum wage) and other labour improvements are announced by the Government. In recent years it was also the day chosen by the Bolivian government to announce the (re)nationalization of strategic sectors of the economy (e.g. hydrocarbons in 2006, telecommunications in 2008, electricity in 2010, etc.).

==== Brazil ====
In Brazil, "Workers' Day" is an official holiday celebrated on 1 May, and unions commemorate it with day-long public events.

==== Canada ====
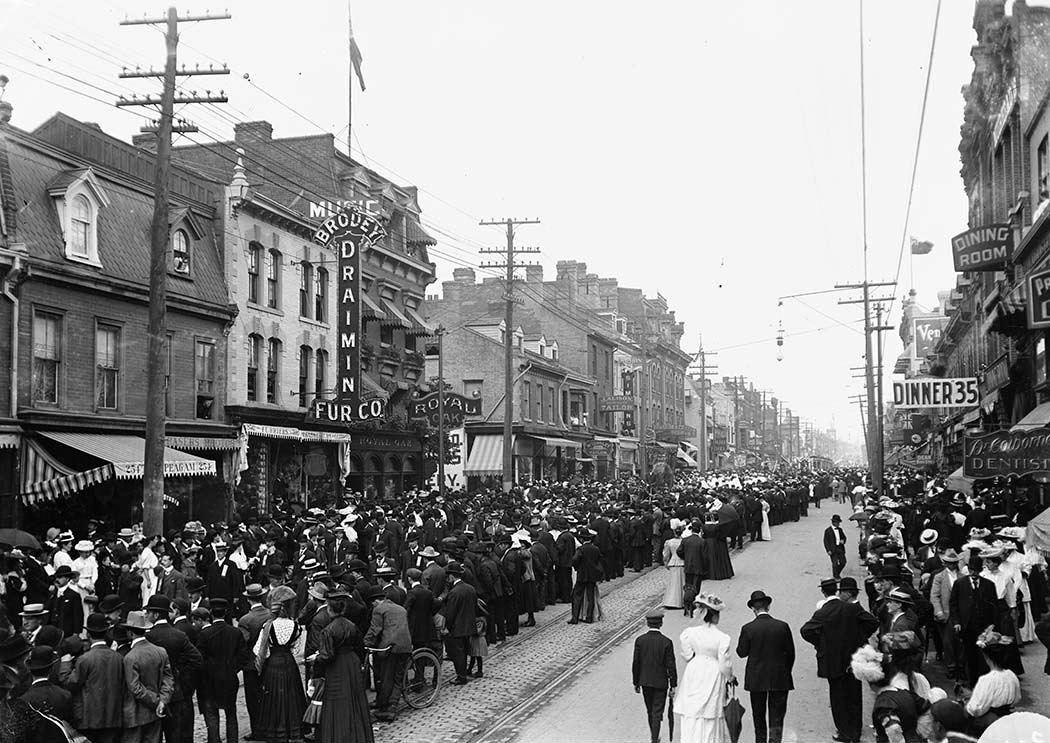
A Labour Day parade in Toronto, Ontario in the early 1900s

Labour Day (French: Fête du Travail) has been marked as a statutory public holiday in Canada on the first Monday in September since 1894. Its origins can be traced back to numerous local demonstrations and celebrations in earlier decades. Such events assumed political significance when a labour demonstration in Toronto in April 1872, in support of striking printers, led directly to the enactment of the Trade Union Act, a law that confirmed the legality of unions. On 22 July 1882, a labour celebration in Toronto attracted the attention of American labour leader Peter J. McGuire, who organised a similar parade in New York City on 5 September that year. Labour parades were held in several Canadian cities that day as well. In 1894, the government of Prime Minister John Sparrow David Thompson declared the first Monday in September as Canada's official Labour Day. Labor Day in the United States is on the same day.

Unions associated with the Knights of Labor and the American Federation of Labor in both Canada and the United States subsequently promoted parades and festivals on the first Monday in September. In Canada, local celebrations took place in Hamilton, Oshawa, Montreal, St. Catharines, Halifax, Ottawa, Vancouver and London during these years. Montreal declared a civic holiday in 1889. In Nova Scotia, coal miners had been holding picnics and parades since 1880 to celebrate the anniversary of their union, the Provincial Workmen's Association, first organised in 1879.

In addition, in 1889, the Royal Commission on the Relations of Labour and Capital in Canada, chaired by James Sherrard Armstrong (1886–88) and Augustus Toplady Freed (1888–89), recommended recognition of an official "labour day" by the federal government. In March and April 1894, unions lobbied Parliament to recognise Labour Day as a public holiday. Legislation was introduced in May by prime minister Sir John Thompson and received royal assent in July 1894.

International Workers' Day is however marked by unions and leftists on 1 May. It is an important day of trade union and community group protest in the province of Quebec (though not a provincial statutory holiday). Celebration of the International Labour Day (or "International Workers' Day"; French: Journée internationale des travailleurs) in Montreal goes back to 1906, organized by the Mutual Aid circle. The tradition had a renaissance at the time of a mass strike in 1972. On the 1973 Labour Day, the first contemporary demonstration was organized by the major trade union confederations; over 30,000 trade unionists took part in this demonstration. Further, it is the customary date on which the minimum wage rises.

Since 2019, the Labour May Day Committee has organized the International Workers' Day march with a rally at Nathan Phillips Square on either May 1 or the closest Saturday. The Mayworks Festival of Working People & the Arts has been held annually in Toronto since 1985 throughout the month of May.

==== Chile ====
President General of the Army Carlos Ibáñez del Campo decreed 1 May a national holiday in 1931, in honour of the dignity of workers. All stores and public services must close for the entire day, and the major trade unions of Chile, represented in the national organization Workers' United Center of Chile (Central Unitaria de Trabajadores), organize rallies during the morning hours, with festivities and cookouts in the later part of the day, in all the major cities of Chile. During these rallies, representatives of the major left-wing political parties speak to the assemblies on the issues of the day concerning workers' rights.

==== Colombia ====
1 May has long been recognized as Labour Day and almost all workers respect it as a national holiday. As in many other countries, it is common to see rallies by the trade unions in all over the main regional capitals of the country.

==== Costa Rica ====
First celebrated in 1913, labor day is a public holiday, and at the same time an important day for government activities. On this day, the President of Costa Rica gives a speech to the citizens and the legislature of Costa Rica about the duties that were undertaken through the previous year. The president of the legislature is also chosen by its members.

==== Cuba ====
This day is known as Labour Day in Cuba. People march in the streets, showing their support to the Cuban Communist government and the Cuban Revolution during the whole morning.

==== Dominica ====
In Dominica, Labour Day is a public holiday on the first Monday in May.

==== Dominican Republic ====
1 May is a national holiday known as Labour Day and celebrated by festivities.

==== Ecuador ====
In Ecuador, 1 May is an official public holiday known as Labour Day. People do not go to work and spend time with their relatives or gather for demonstrations.

==== El Salvador ====
1 May is an official public holiday known as Labour Day.

==== Guatemala ====
1 May is an official public holiday known as Labour Day.

==== Haiti ====
1 May is an official public holiday known as Agriculture and Labour Day.

==== Honduras ====
1 May is an official holiday, known as "Labour Day" within Honduras.

==== Jamaica ====
Labour Day in Jamaica is historically tied to the working class and the country's shift away from colonial traditions. Originally, 24 May was observed as Empire Day, celebrating Queen Victoria's birthday. In British history, she is credited with granting freedom to enslaved people in the colonies. Empire Day was widely observed across the Commonwealth, including Jamaica, but as the country moved toward independence, there was growing sentiment to replace it with something more reflective of Jamaica's own labour struggles.

Premier Norman Manley led this change in 1960 by introducing a bill to abolish Empire Day and replace it with Labour Day to commemorate the 1938 labour strikes. These strikes were a turning point in Jamaican history, as grossly underpaid workers across the island organized in protest. On 23 May 1938, public sector and transport workers in Kingston had joined the movement, halting activity in the capital. The unrest led to 46 deaths, 429 injuries, and numerous arrests, marking a major push for labour rights in the country. Manley's proposal to commemorate these events gained unanimous support in Parliament, officially establishing Labour Day on 23 May.

In the 1960s, Labour Day celebrations were heavily tied to politics, with the two major trade unions—the Bustamante Industrial Trade Union (JLP) and the National Workers Union (PNP)—leading marches and rallies in Kingston. However, these events often turned violent. In 1962, a politically motivated clash during a Labour Day march resulted in the death of a woman and injuries to several police officers, who resorted to using tear gas to control the crowd. Additional conflicts in 1966 led authorities to ban Labour Day marches in Kingston, marking a shift in how the holiday was observed.

Prime Minister Michael Manley redefined Labour Day in 1972 with the theme "Put Work into Labour Day." Rather than focusing on rallies and marches, Manley encouraged Jamaicans to actively participate in community projects. His vision emphasized the role of labour in nation-building, inspiring voluntary efforts across the island. The first national project focused on beautifying the Palisadoes Road, with Manley himself participating in tree planting. The response was overwhelming, with 600 projects completed that year, cementing Labour Day as a day of national pride and community service. This momentum slowed under Prime Minister Edward Seaga in 1980, when large-scale Labour Day activities were halted, leading to an eight-year absence of organized projects. It was not until 1989, when Michael Manley returned to office, that Labour Day was fully revived. The Jamaican government consistently introduced themes to guide national activities, ensuring that community development remained central to the celebrations. Since then, Labour Day has continued as a tradition that blends historical remembrance with civic responsibility.

==== Mexico ====
1 May is a public holiday.

==== Panama ====
1 May is an official public holiday, known as "Labour Day" within Panama.

==== Paraguay ====
1 May is an official public holiday, known as "Labour Day" within Paraguay.

==== Peru ====
1 May is an official public holiday, known as "Labour Day" within Peru.

==== Saint Kitts and Nevis ====
In Saint Kitts and Nevis, Labour Day is a public holiday on the first Monday in May.

==== Trinidad and Tobago ====
In Trinidad and Tobago, Labour Day is celebrated every 19 June. This public holiday was proposed in 1973 to be commemorated on the anniversary of the labour riots led by Tubal Uriah Butler in 1937, part of the British West Indian labour unrest of 1934–1939.

==== United States ====
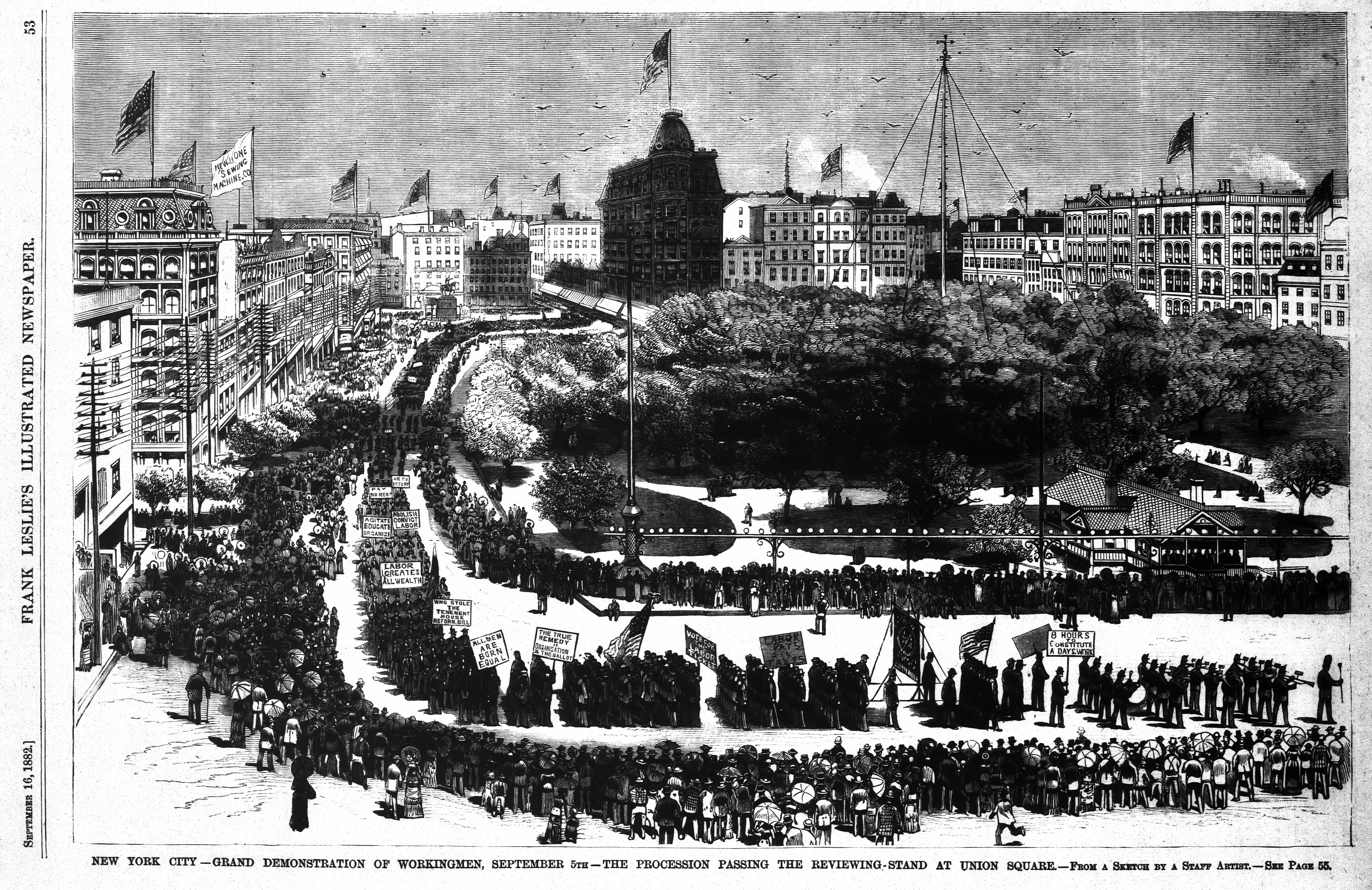
First US Labor Day Parade, 5 September 1882, New York City

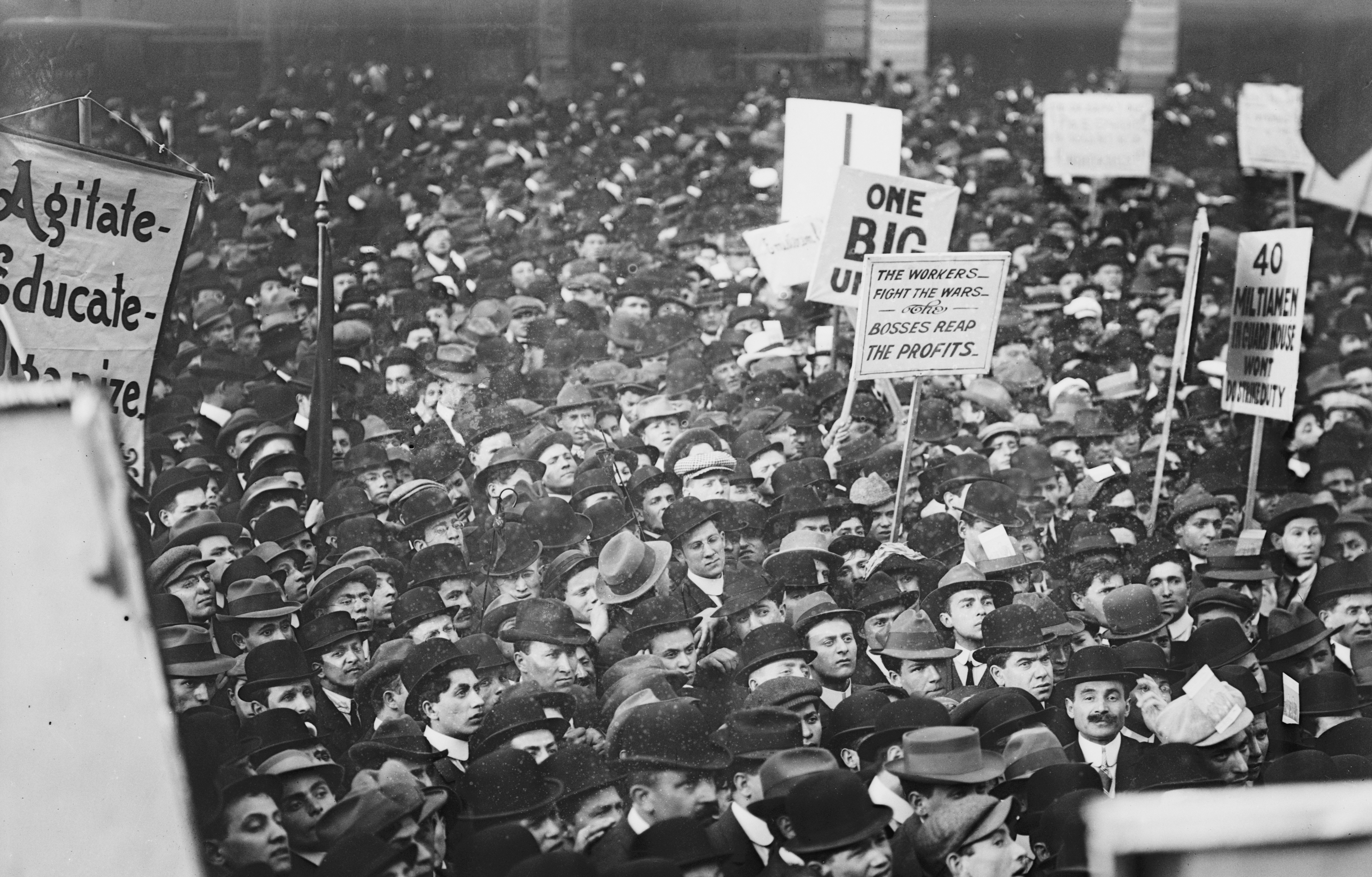
Socialists in Union Square, New York City, on 1 May 1912

In the U.S. starting in 1887, a "Labor Day" celebrated on the first Monday in September was given increasing state recognition. Then in 1894, in the wake of the nationwide Pullman Strike, Congress and President Grover Cleveland passed a law declaring Labor Day a federal holiday.

Efforts to recognize 1 May as a holiday have not been successful.

In 1947, 1 May was established as Loyalty Day by the U.S. Veterans of Foreign Wars as a way to counter communist influence and recruitment at International Workers' Day rallies. Loyalty Day was celebrated across the country with patriotic parades and ceremonies, however the growing conflict over U.S. involvement in Vietnam detracted from the popularity of these celebrations. In 1958, the American Bar Association campaigned to have 1 May designated as Law Day, which was acknowledged in 1961 by a joint resolution of Congress. Law Day exercises, such as mock trials and courthouse tours, are often sponsored by the American Bar Association.

Unions and Political organizations including anarchist groups and socialist and communist parties have kept the International Workers' Day tradition alive with rallies and demonstrations. In 1919 especially large demonstrations took place, and violence greeted the normally peaceful parades in Boston, New York, and Cleveland and a number of people were killed. In Milwaukee, an annual commemoration takes place at the site of the killing of seven workers during a march for the 8-hour workday. Some of the largest examples of this occurred during the Great Depression of the 1930s, when hundreds of thousands of workers marched in International Workers' Day parades in New York's Union Square, while cities like Chicago and Duluth saw large demonstrations organized by the Communist Party.

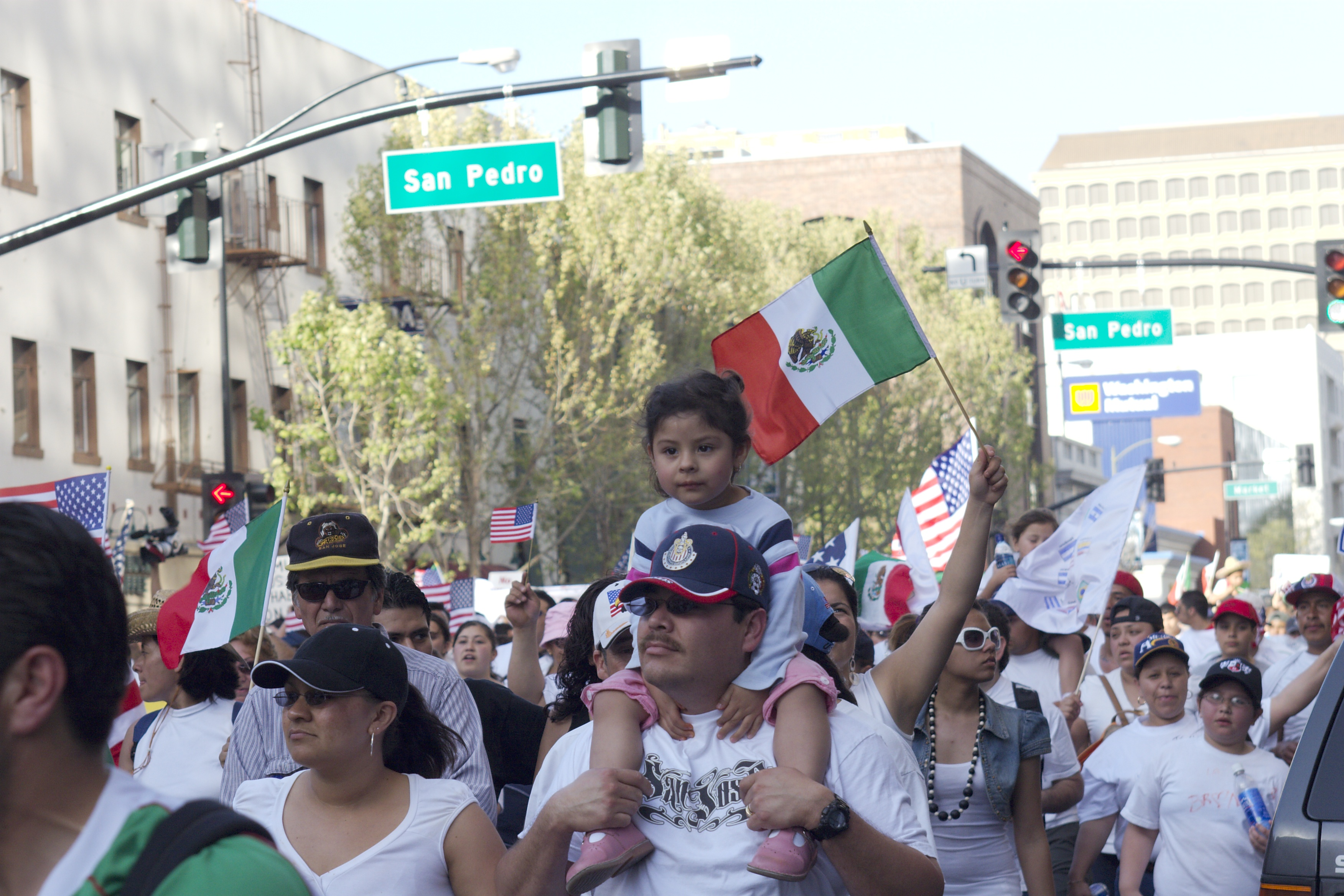
San Jose, California, Workers' Day March, 1 May 2006

In 2006, 1 May was chosen by mostly Latino immigrant groups in the United States as the day for the Great American Boycott, a general strike of undocumented immigrant workers and supporters to protest H.R. 4437, immigration reform legislation that they felt was draconian. From 10 April to 1 May of that year, immigrant families in the U.S. called for immigrant rights, workers' rights and amnesty for undocumented workers. They were joined by socialist and other leftist organizations on 1 May. On 1 May 2007, a mostly peaceful demonstration in Los Angeles in support of undocumented immigrant workers ended with a widely televised dispersal by police officers. In March 2008, the International Longshore and Warehouse Union announced that dockworkers will move no cargo at any West Coast ports on 1 May 2008, as a protest against the continuation of the Iraq War and the diversion of resources from domestic needs.

On 1 May 2012, members of Occupy Wall Street and labor unions held protests together in a number of cities in the United States and Canada to commemorate International Workers' Day and to protest the state of the economy and economic inequality.

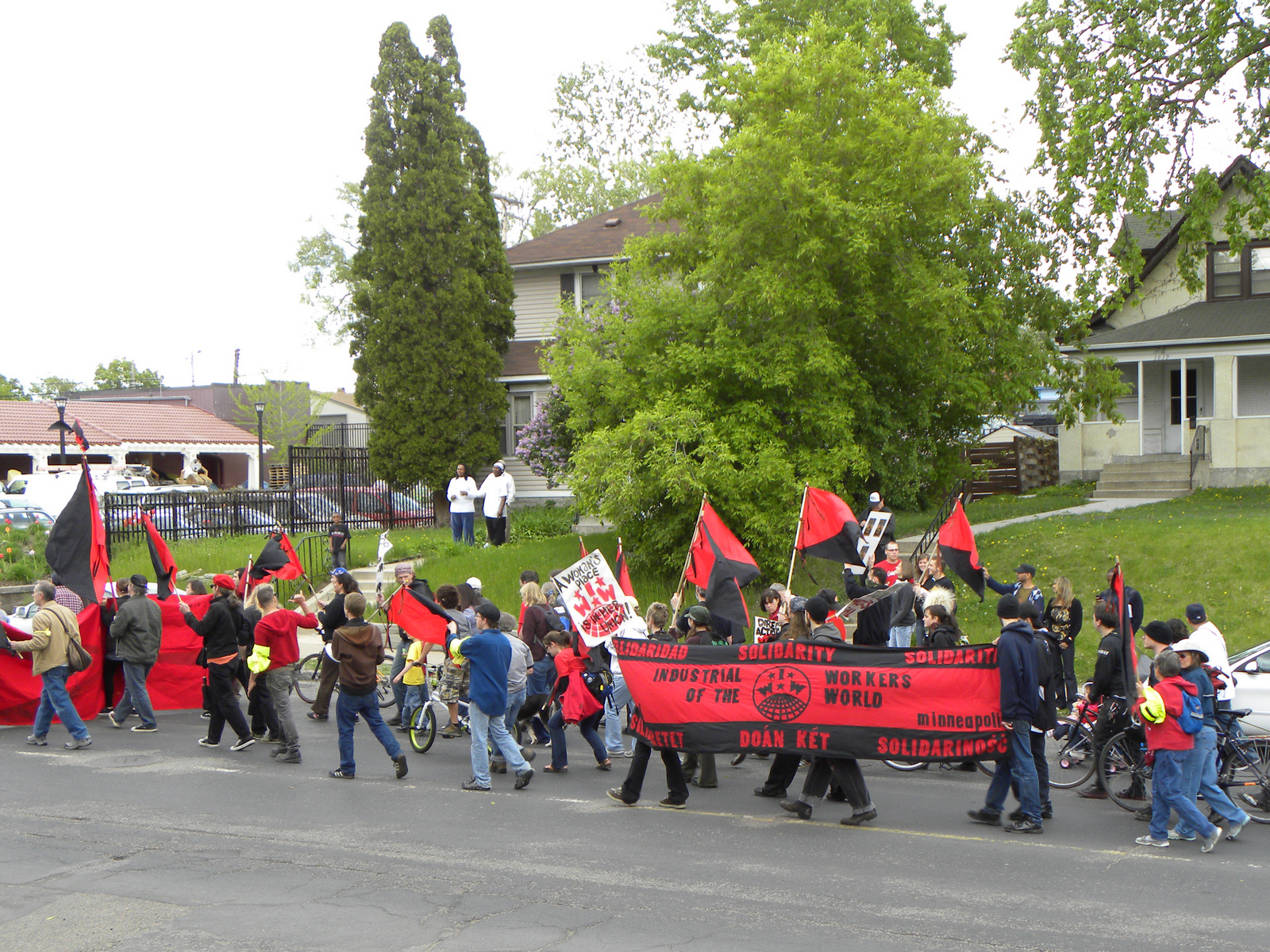
An Industrial Workers of the World group marching in Minneapolis on 1 May 2010

On 1 May 2017, immigrants' rights advocates, labor unions and leftists held protests against the immigration and economic policies of President Donald Trump in cities throughout the US, Chicago and Los Angeles having some of the largest marches.

On 1 May 2020, during the COVID-19 pandemic, "workers at Amazon, Whole Foods, Instacart, Walmart, FedEx, Target, and Shipt say they will walk off the job ... to protest their employers' failure to provide basic protections for frontline workers who are risking and losing their lives at work." Additionally, on the same day, there will be a rent strike, the largest in nearly a century.

On 1 May 2021, black bloc protesters clashed with police in Oakland and Portland. Numerous other activities occurred across the country.

On 1 May 2026, May Day protests were held across the United States in support of workers' rights, union protections, and public education funding. Labor unions, teachers, immigrant-rights organizations, and community groups organized rallies and marches in a number of cities. Some demonstrations were associated with the slogan "No School, No Work, No Shopping", which promoted consumer and workplace boycotts.

The protests focused on issues including wages, labor protections, economic inequality, and opposition to anti-union policies. Some reports also noted concerns over rising living costs and reduced purchasing power in the context of higher global energy prices and geopolitical tensions, including the Iran war.

Protesters voiced opposition to a series of government policies and economic conditions that they argued systematically favored wealthy individuals while neglecting the working class. Central to their grievances was the perceived erosion of basic labor rights, including the difficulty or inability of federal employees to appeal wrongful dismissals—a consequence of policies that reclassified many workers as "at-will" employees. Demonstrators also expressed concern over repeated budget cuts to workplace safety programs, which they believed directly endangered the lives of public sector workers such as nurses and teachers. Additionally, protesters highlighted the stagnation of the federal minimum wage, which had remained unchanged at $7.25 per hour for more than fifteen years—a duration that, in their view, reflected a broader pattern of inattention to the worsening living standards of ordinary workers.

All banks, schools, and most places of business are closed in celebration of Labor Day. The holiday is viewed as the informal end of summer. Many schools open for the year on the day or week after Labor Day.

==== Uruguay ====
In Uruguay, 1 May – Workers' Day – is an official holiday. Even when it is associated with labour unions, almost all workers tend to respect it. Since the late 1990s, the main event takes place at the First of May Square in Montevideo.

==== Venezuela ====
In Venezuela, Workers' Day (El Día del Trabajador) is celebrated on 1 May since 1936, but from 1938 to 1945 it was held on 24 July, by an order of Eleazar López Contreras. However, Isaías Medina Angarita changed it back to 1 May in 1945.

=== East Asia ===
==== Mainland China ====
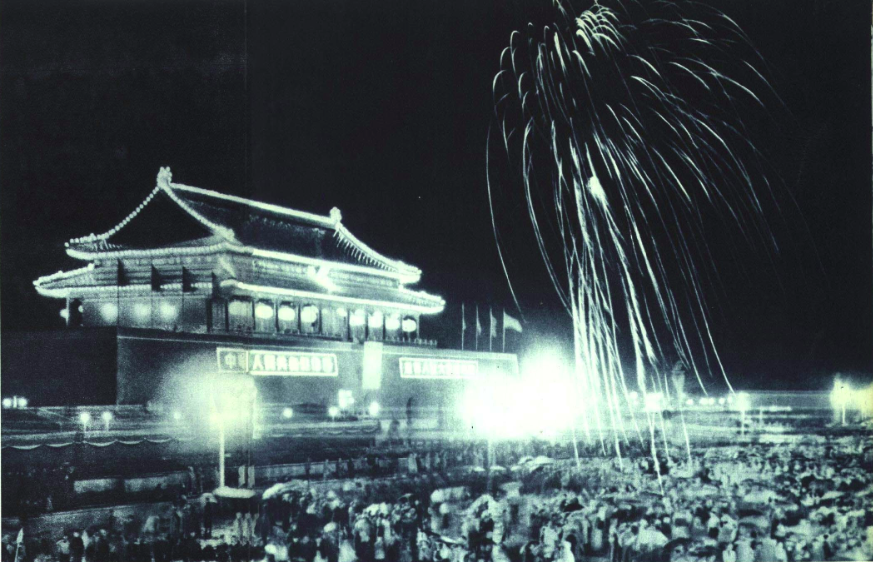
International Workers' Day celebration in Beijing on 1 May 1952

1 May is a statutory holiday in the People's Republic of China. It was a three-day holiday before 2008, but was only one day from 2008 onward. During a Golden Week, surrounding weekends are rescheduled so that workers have seven continuous days off before 2009 and four to five continuous days after 2018.

As of 2025, the statutory Labour Day holiday is two days, 1 and 2 May. This is an increase from the one statutory day observed from 2008 to 2024. Labour Day had been a three-day statutory holiday from 1999 until 2007.

In practice, the Labour Day break is often longer than the statutory holiday itself. The State Council commonly adjusts adjacent weekends to create a longer holiday period, often a three- to five-day "short holiday", with one or more nearby weekend days designated as working days to make up for the additional days off. For example, in 2025 the Labour Day holiday ran from 1 May to 5 May, while 27 April was designated as a working day.

==== Hong Kong S.A.R. ====
Labour Day, observed 1 May, has been considered a public holiday in Hong Kong since 1999.

==== Kazakhstan ====
Labour Day, a public holiday in Kazakhstan, is celebrated on the last Sunday in September. The holiday was officially established in late 2013. In 1995, the government of Kazakhstan replaced International Workers' Day with Kazakhstan People's Unity Day. Kazakh president Nursultan Nazarbayev also instituted a special medal that is awarded to veterans of labour on the occasion of the holiday.

Labour Day is widely celebrated across the country with official speeches, award ceremonies, cultural events, etc. It is a non-working holiday for most citizens of Kazakhstan because it always falls on a weekend.

==== Macau S.A.R. ====
In Macau, it is a public holiday and is officially known as Dia do Trabalhador (Portuguese for "Workers' Day").

==== Taiwan ====
1 May is known as Labor Day in Taiwan. Originally, students and teachers did not have this day off. However, Labor Day was later upgraded as a full national holiday and extends beyond workers.

==== Japan ====
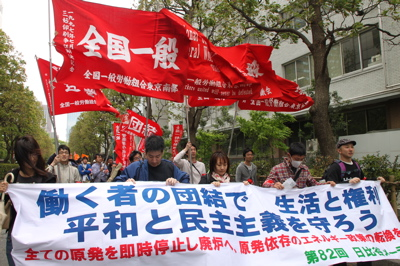
2011 National Trade Union Council (Zenrokyo) May Day march, Tokyo

A public holiday in Japan, Labour Day is officially conflated with Thanksgiving on 23 November, as Labor Thanksgiving Day.

International Workers' Day is not officially designated by the Japanese government as a national holiday, but as it lies between other national holidays, it is a day off work for the vast majority of Japanese workers. Many employers give it as a day off, and otherwise workers take it as "paid leave". 1 May occurs during "Golden Week", together with 29 April ("Shōwa Day"), 3 May ("Constitution Memorial Day"), 4 May ("Greenery Day") and 5 May ("Children's Day"). Workers generally take the day off work not so much to join street rallies or labour union gatherings, but more to go on holiday for several consecutive days (in Japanese corporate culture, taking weekdays off for personal pleasure is widely frowned upon).

Some major labour unions organize rallies and demonstrations in Tokyo, Osaka, and Nagoya. Japan has a long history of labour activism and has had a communist and socialist party in the Diet since 1945. In 2008, the National Confederation of Trade Unions (Zenrōren) held a rally in Yoyogi Park attended by 44,000 participants. In 2026, Rengō, the largest Japanese trade union, held its International Workers' Day rally on April 29th with the Prime Minister attending.

==== North Korea ====
In the Democratic People's Republic of Korea, 1 May is known as International Workers' Day, and is a public holiday. Celebrations, local meetings and rallies are held every year throughout the country to honor the holiday. The Rungnado May Day Stadium in the capital of Pyongyang is named in honor of the holiday.

==== South Korea ====
In the Republic of Korea, 1 May is known simply as "Workers' Day". It is a public holiday since 2026 by the Designation of Workers' Day Act. (Note: 5월 1일을 근로자의 날로 하고 이 날을 "근로기준법"에 의한 유급휴일로 한다. ("The first day of May each year shall be designated as Workers' Day, which shall be a paid holiday under the 'Labor Standards Act'.)")

=== Europe ===
==== Albania ====
Labour Day (Albanian: Dita e punëtorëve) is an official holiday celebrated on 1 May and thus schools and most businesses are closed.

==== Armenia ====
Labour Day (Armenian: Աշխատանքի օր, ashxatanki or) is an official holiday celebrated on 1 May.

==== Austria ====
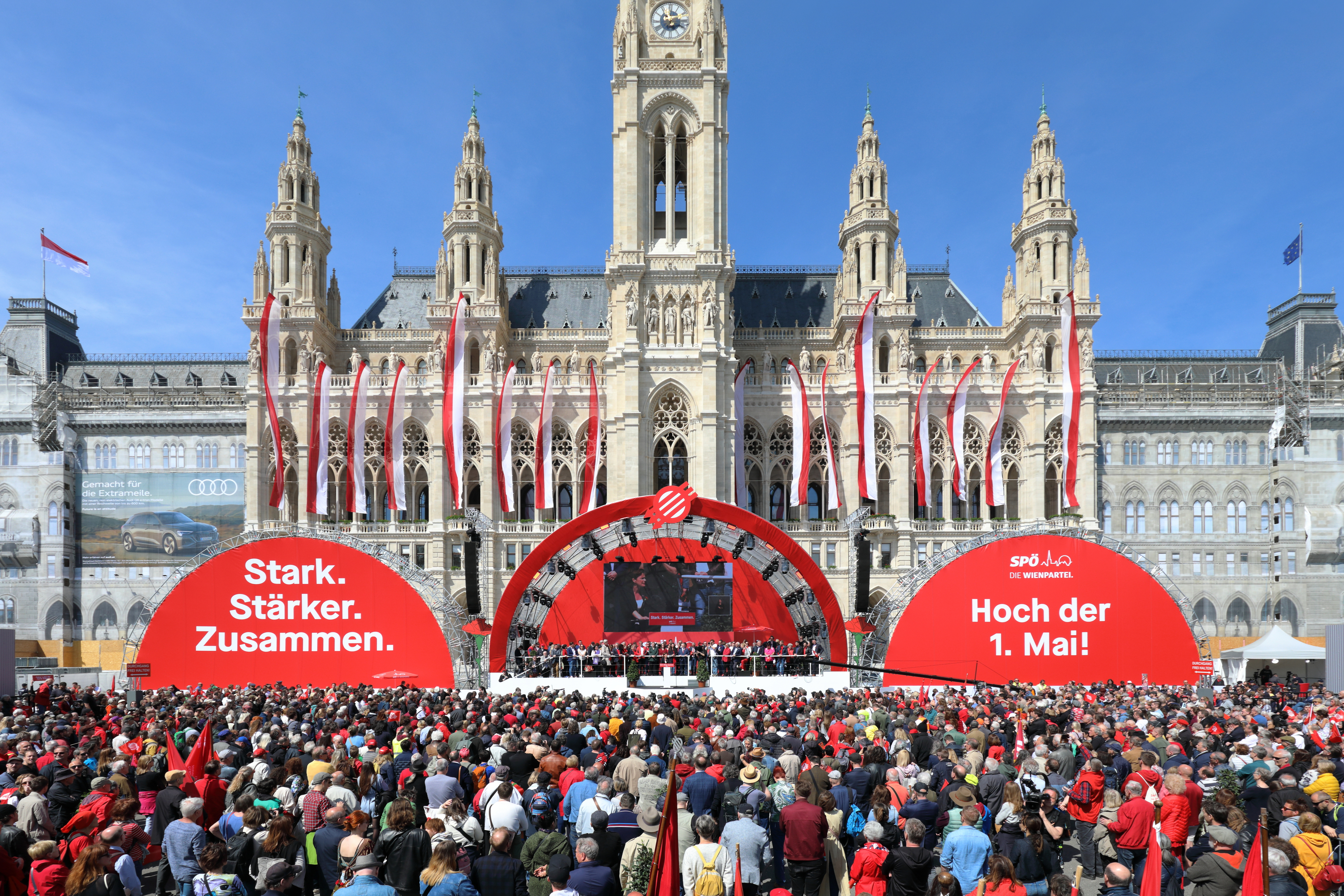
1st of May demonstration of the SPÖ at Rathausplatz in Vienna

Labour Day (Tag der Arbeit), officially called Staatsfeiertag (state's holiday), is a public holiday in Austria. Left parties, especially social democrats and democratic socialists organize celebrations with marches and speeches in all major cities.

==== Belgium ====
In Belgium, Labour Day (Dutch: Dag van de Arbeid, Feest van de Arbeid, French: Journée des travailleurs, Fête du travail), is observed on 1 May and is an official holiday since 1948. Various socialist and communist organizations hold parades and other events in different cities.

==== Bosnia and Herzegovina ====
In Bosnia and Herzegovina, 1 and 2 May (Bosnian and Serbian: Prvi Maj / Први Mај, Croatian: Prvi Svibanj) are an official holiday and day-off for public bodies and schools at the national level. Most people celebrate this holiday by visiting natural parks and resorts. Additionally, in some places public events are organized.

==== Bulgaria ====
Labour Day is one of the public holidays in Bulgaria, where it is known as Labour Day and International Workers' Solidarity Day (Bulgarian: Ден на труда и на международната работническа солидарност) and celebrated annually on 1 May. The first attempt to celebrate it was in 1890 by the Bulgarian Typographical Association. In 1939, Labour Day was declared an official holiday. Since 1945 the communist authorities in the People's Republic of Bulgaria began to celebrate the holiday every year. After the end of socialism in Bulgaria in 1989 Labour Day continues to be an official and public holiday, but state authorities are not committed to the organization of mass events.

==== Croatia ====
In Croatia, 1 May is a national holiday, Labour Day. Many public events are organized and held all over the country where bean soup is given out to all people as a symbol of a real workers' dish. Red carnations are also handed out to symbolise the origin of the day. In Zagreb, the capital, a major gathering is in Maksimir Park, which is located in the east part of Zagreb. In Split, city on the coast, people go to Marjan, a park-forest at the western end of Split peninsula.

==== Cyprus ====
In Cyprus, 1 May (Greek: Εργατική Πρωτομαγιά) is considered as an official Public Holiday (Labour Day). In general, all stores remain closed in public and private sector. The Labor Union and Syndicates celebrate with various festivals and events across the country.

==== Czech Republic ====
In the Czech Republic, 1 May is an official and national holiday known as Labour Day (Czech: Svátek práce).

==== Denmark ====
In Denmark, 1 May is not an official holiday, but a variety of individuals, mostly in the public sector, construction industry, and production industry, get a half or a whole day off. It was first celebrated in Copenhagen in 1890. The location of the first celebration, the Fælledparken, still plays an important part today with speeches by politicians and trade unionists to mark the occasion. Many other events are also held around the country to commemorate the day.

==== Estonia ====
In Estonia, 1 May is a public holiday and celebrated as part of May Day (Kevadpüha). It also coincides with Walpurgis Day (volbripäev).

==== Finland ====
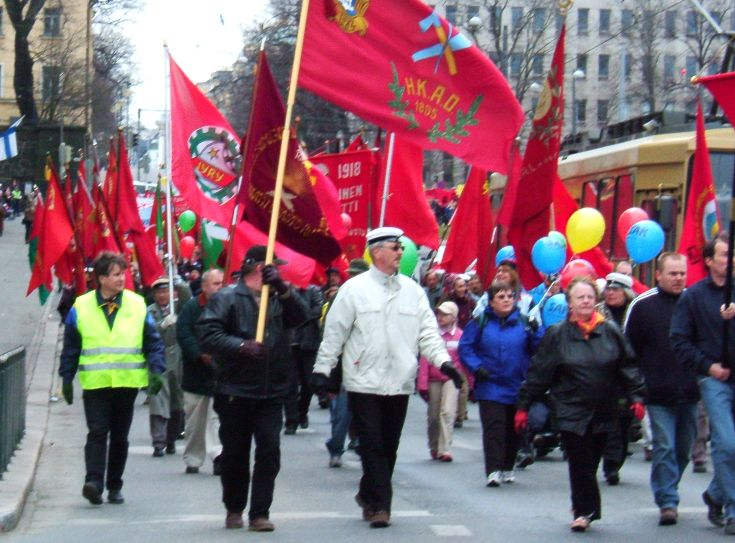
A Workers' Day rally in Helsinki, Finland

In Finland, 1 May is an official and national holiday. It is mainly celebrated as a feast of students, and spring, called vappu or Walpurgis Night. Finland also celebrates Workers' Day (officially: suomalaisen työn päivä, "day of Finnish labour") on the same day.

==== France ====
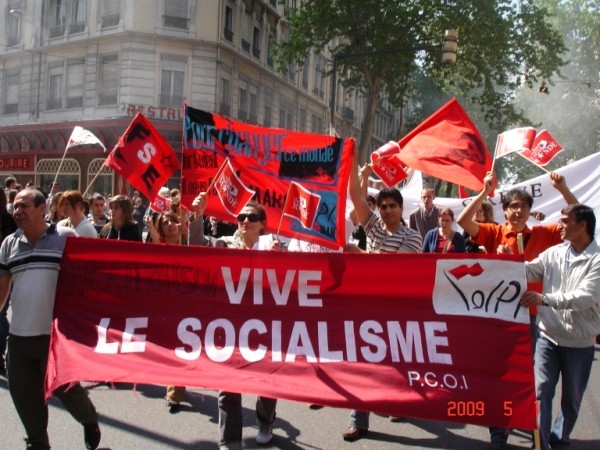
Workers' Day demonstration in Lyon, France

In France, 1 May is a public holiday called Workers' Day (French: Fête des Travailleurs). It is, in fact, the only day of the year when employees are legally obliged to be given leave, save professions that cannot be interrupted due to their nature (such as workers in hospitals and public transport). Demonstrations and marches are a Labour Day tradition in France, where trade unions organize parades in major cities to defend workers' rights. It is also customary to offer a lily of the valley to friends or family. This custom dates back to 1561, when king Charles IX, aged 10, waiting for his accession to the throne, gave a lily of the valley to all ladies present. Today, the fiscal administration exempts individuals and workers' organizations from any tax or administrative duties related to the sales of lilies of the valley, provided they are gathered from the wild, and not bought to be resold.

==== Germany ====
In April 1933, the recently installed Nazi government declared 1 May the "Day of National Work", an official state holiday, and announced that all celebrations were to be organized by the government. Any separate celebrations by Communists, Social Democrats or labour unions were banned. After World War II, 1 May remained a state holiday in both East and West Germany. In communist East Germany, workers were de facto required to participate in large state-organized parades on International Workers' Day. Today in Germany it is simply called "Labour Day" (Tag der Arbeit), and there are numerous demonstrations and celebrations by independent workers' organizations. Today, Berlin witnesses yearly demonstrations on Labour Day, the largest organised by labour unions, political parties, the far left and the leftist Autonomen.

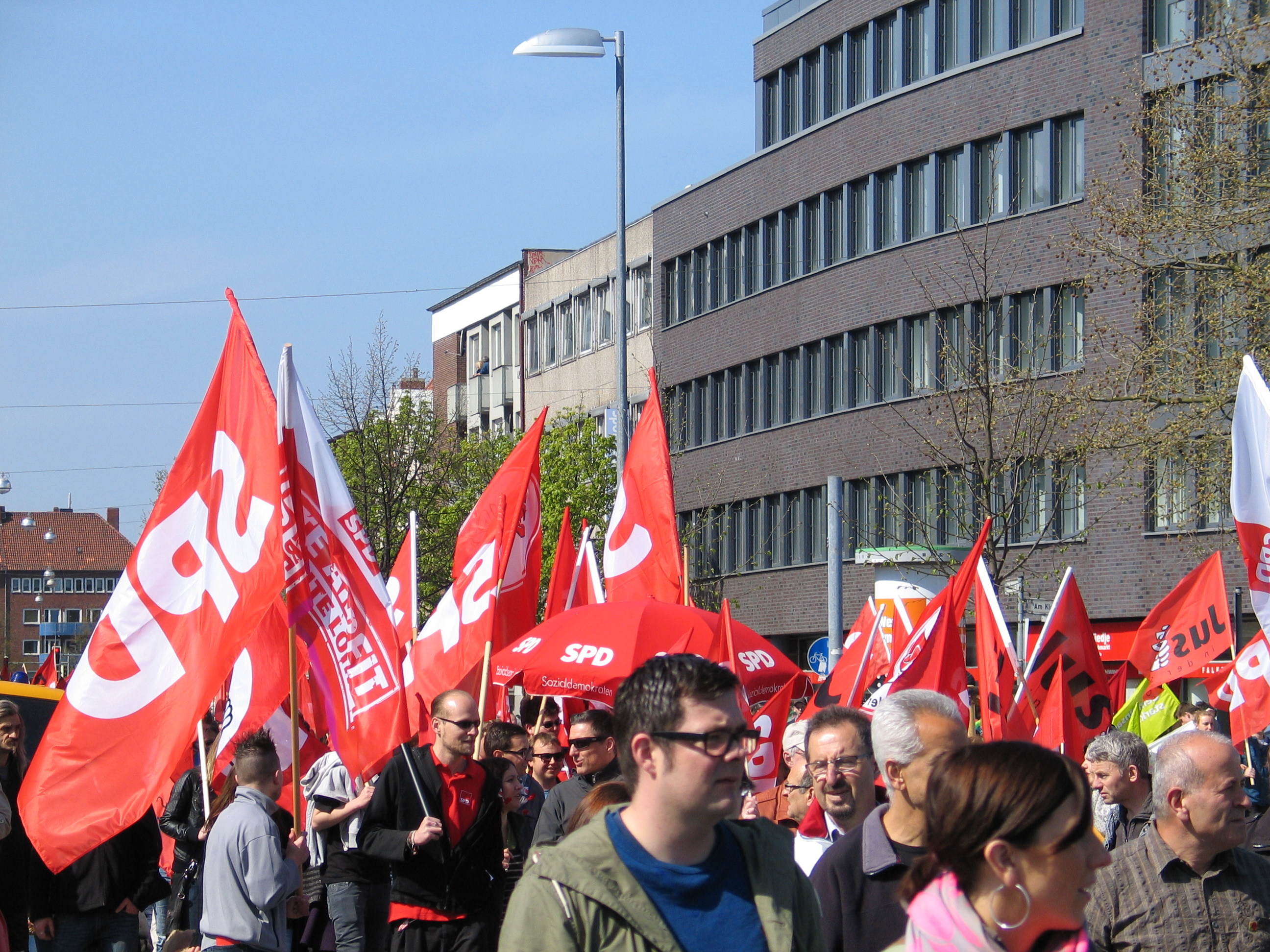
Labour Day rally in Hanover, Germany, 1 May 2013

Since 1987, Labour Day has also become known for riots in some districts of Berlin. After police actions against radical leftists in that year's annual demonstrations, the Autonomen scattered and sought cover at the ongoing annual street fair in Kreuzberg. Three years prior to the reunification of Germany, violent protests would only take place in the former West Berlin. The protesters began tipping over police cars, violently resisting arrest, and began building barricades after the police withdrew due to the unforeseen resistance. Cars were set on fire, shops plundered and burned to the ground. The police eventually ended the riots the following night. These violent forms of protests by the radical left later increasingly involved participants without political motivation.

Annual street fairs have proven an effective way to prevent riots, and Labour Day in 2005 and 2006 have been among the most peaceful known to Berlin in nearly 25 years. Neo-Nazis and other groups on the far right, such as the National Democratic Party of Germany, have used May Day to schedule public demonstrations.

Labour Day violence flared up again in 2010. After an approved far-right demonstration was blocked by leftists, a parade by an estimated 10,000 leftists and anarchists turned violent and resulted in an active response by the Berlin Police.

==== Greece ====
In Greece, 1 May is an optional public holiday, but is treated by workers as a strike. The Ministry of Labour retains the right to classify it as an official public holiday on an annual basis, and it customarily does so. The day is called Ergatikí Proto-magiá (Εργατική Πρωτομαγιά, lit. "Workers' 1 May") and celebrations are marked by demonstrations in which left-wing political parties, anti-authority groups, and workers' unions participate. On Workers' Day in 2010, there were major protests all over Greece, most notably Athens and Thessaloniki, by many left, anarchist and communist supporters and some violent clashes with riot police who were sent out to contain the protesters. They opposed economic reforms, an end to job losses and wage cuts in the face of the government's proposals of massive public spending cuts. These reforms are to fall in line with the IMF-EU-ECB loan proposals, which demand that Greece liberalize its economy and cut its public spending and private sector wages, which many believe will decrease living standards.

==== Hungary ====
Hungary celebrates 1 May as a national holiday, Workers' Day (Hungarian: A munka ünnepe), with open-air festivities and fairs all over the country. Many towns raise May poles and festivals with various themes are organized around the holiday. Left-wing parties and trade unions hold public rallies commemorating Labour Day.

==== Iceland ====
In Iceland, Labour Day (Icelandic: Baráttudagur verkalýðsins) is a public holiday. The first demonstration for workers rights in Iceland occurred in 1923. A parade composed of trade unions and other groups marches through towns and cities across the country and speeches are delivered. However, some private businesses are open, mainly in the capital.

==== Ireland ====
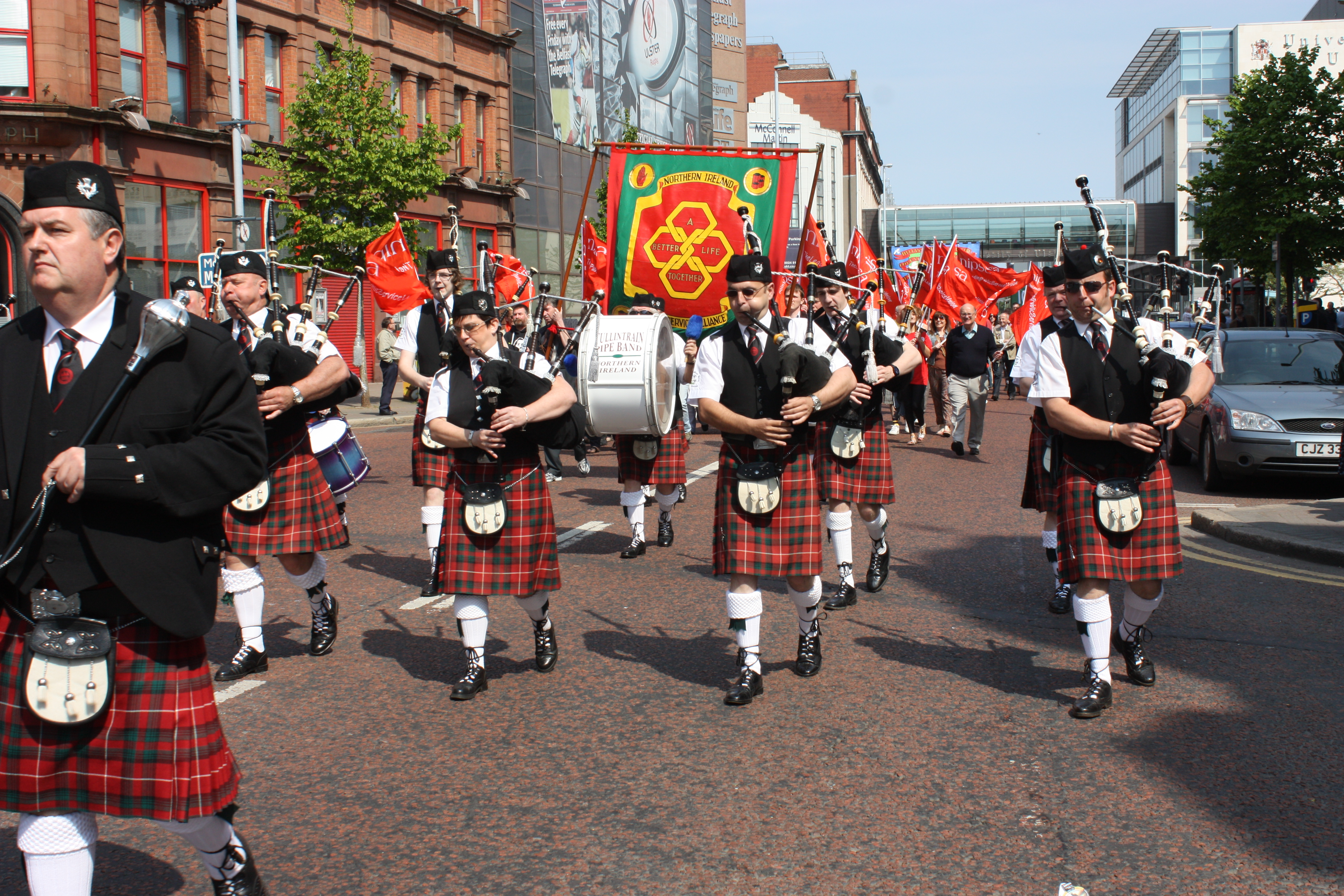
International Workers' Day parade in Belfast, 2011

The Irish Congress of Trade Unions (ICTU) marks International Workers' Day with rallies in Belfast and Dublin and other events such as lectures, concerts and film screenings also take place around a wider International Workers' Day festival. The first Monday in May has been a public holiday in the Republic of Ireland since 1994 and in Northern Ireland since 1978. In the Republic the public holiday was demanded by the ICTU and proposed by the Labour Party in negotiating its 1992–94 coalition government with Fianna Fáil, and marked the centenary of the ICTU's predecessor, the Irish Trades Union Congress. The public holiday has no official designation, as "Workers' Day" or otherwise. In 2005, Labour's Ruairi Quinn condemned an alleged Fianna Fáil proposal to replace the May holiday with one on 24 April commemorating the 1916 Rising as a slight to workers. The proposal was, in actuality, for an extra holiday – rather than a replacement.

==== Italy ====
Traditional 1 May Concert in St. John Lateran square, Rome

The first International Workers' Day celebration in Italy took place in 1890. Industrialists threatened to fire absent workers, so most industrial workers showed up to work. The event succeeded due to artisan and craft support. It was abolished under the Fascist regime and immediately restored after the Second World War. (During the fascist period, a "Holiday of the Italian Labour" (Festa del lavoro italiano) was celebrated on 21 April, the date of Natale di Roma, when Rome was allegedly founded.) In 1947, following an unexpected electoral victory of the Popular Democratic Front in Sicily, local secessionists and pro-USA mafia hitmen killed 14 and injured 27 firing machine guns at an International Workers' Day celebration in the Portella della Ginestra Massacre. International Workers' Day is now an important celebration in Italy and is a national holiday regardless of what day of the week it falls. The Concerto del Primo Maggio ("1st of May Concert"), organized by Italian labour unions in Rome in Piazza di Porta San Giovanni has become an important event in recent years. Every year the concert is attended by a large audience of mostly young people and involves the participation of many famous bands and songwriters, lasting from 15:00 until midnight. The concert is usually broadcast live on Rai 3. A second big concert is organised in the city of Taranto and it is transmitted locally by TGR Apulia.

==== Lithuania ====
In Lithuania, 1 May is an official public holiday celebrated as International Work Day (Lithuanian: Tarptautinė darbo diena). Celebrations for workers' day were mandatory during the Soviet occupation, and carry a negative connotation as a result today. As Lithuania restored its independence in 1990, Work Day lost its public holiday status, but regained it in 2001.

==== Latvia ====
In Latvia, Labour Day is an official public holiday celebrated as Convocation of the Constituent Assembly of the Republic of Latvia, Labour Day.

==== Luxembourg ====
In Luxembourg, 1 May, called the Dag vun der Aarbecht ("Labour Day"), is a legal holiday traditionally associated with large demonstrations by trade unions in Luxembourg City and other cities.

==== Malta ====
In Malta, 1 May is an official public holiday celebrated as "Workers' Day", together with the religious feast of Saint Joseph the Worker. (Saint Joseph's Day, 19 March, the saint's main feast, is also a public holiday in Malta). A Labour mass meeting takes place on 1 May. Nationalists celebrate accession to the European Union on 1 May 2004.

==== Montenegro ====
In Montenegro, 1 May is an official public holiday and a day off work and a day out of school. It is the only official holiday from socialist times that is still officially celebrated.

==== Netherlands ====
In the Netherlands, 1 May or Labour Day (Dutch: Dag van de Arbeid) is not an official holiday. This is due in part to its proximity to the national holiday, Koningsdag, which was celebrated on the day before until 2013. Labour movements also did not see the need to agitate for an extra day off during the Post–World War II recovery efforts. Liberals who joined the Labour Party in this same period also wanted to distance themselves from the Soviet Union because of Cold War sentiments. A small number of public servants has the day off, as well as bank employees and financial traders as the European banking system is not open that day.

==== North Macedonia ====
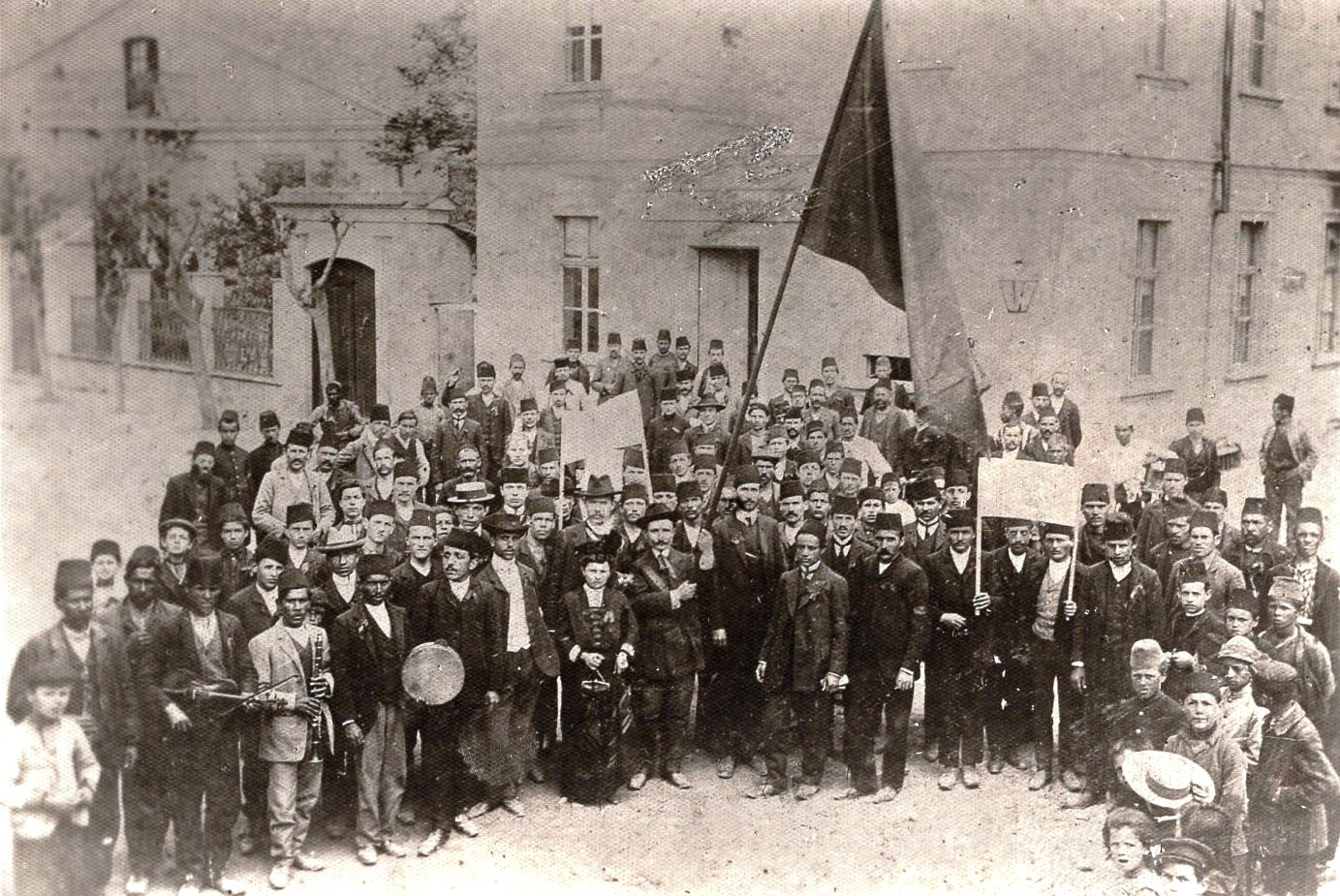
First Workers' Day celebration of the Ottoman period in Skopje, 1909

In North Macedonia, 1 May (Macedonian: Ден на Трудот, Den na Trudot) is an official public holiday. Before 2007, 2 may was also a public holiday. People celebrate with friends and family at traditional picnics across the country, accompanied by the usual outdoor games, various grilled meats and beverages. Left organizations and some trade unions organize protests on 1 May.

==== Norway ====
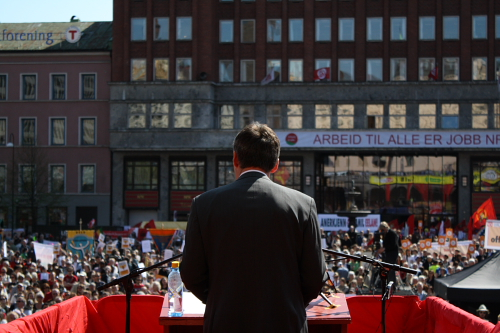
Norway's then Prime Minister Jens Stoltenberg gives his 1 May speech in 2009 in Oslo, Norway.

In Norway, Labour Day (Norwegian: Arbeidernes Dag) is celebrated 1 May and has been an official public holiday since 1947. It was first introduced by the workers movement in 1890, and recognized as an official flag day in 1935. The program for the day is presented by local unions and labour organizations.

==== Poland ====
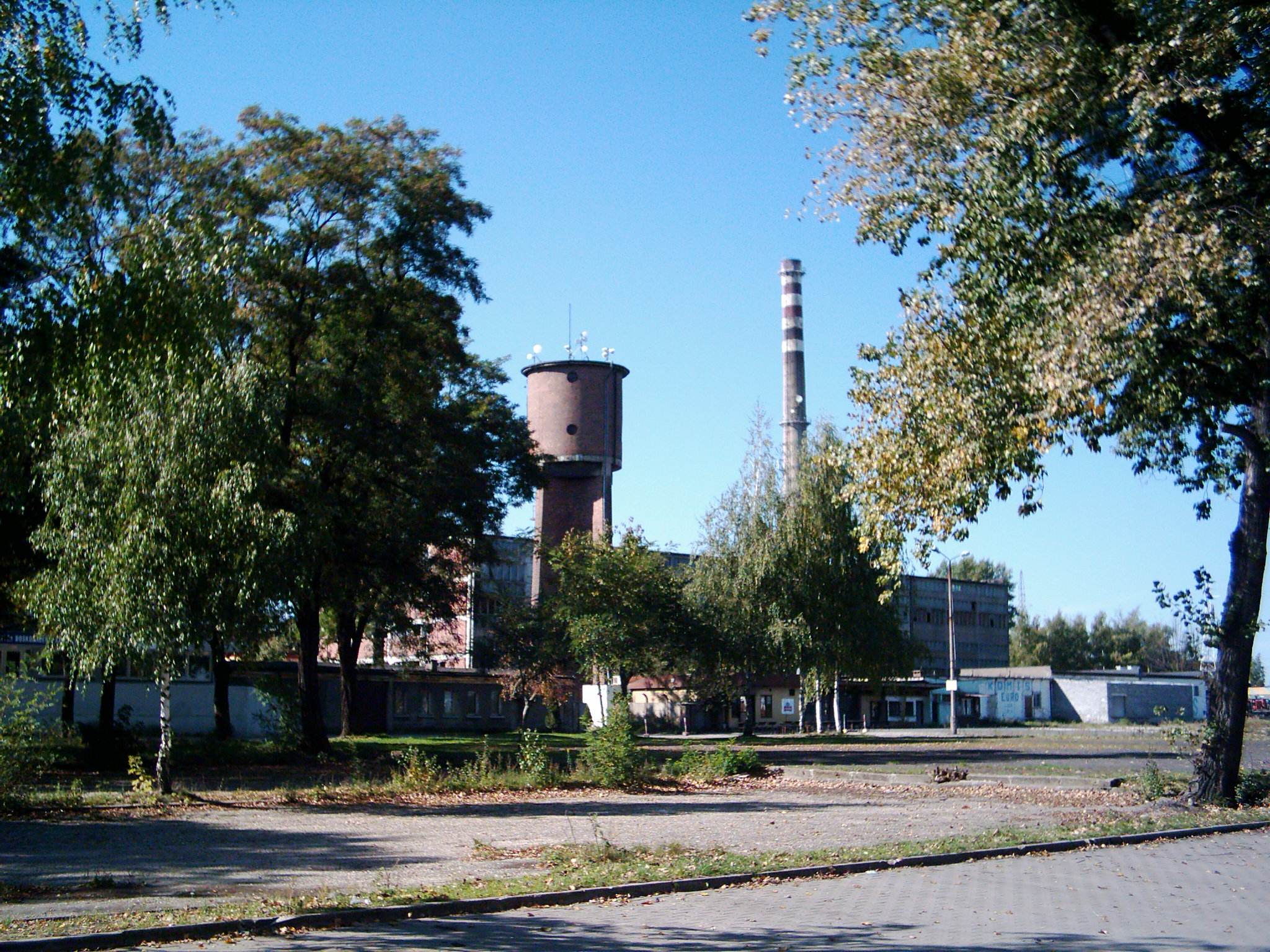
1 May Coal Mine in Wodzisław Śląski, Poland

In Poland, since the fall of communism, 1 May is officially celebrated as Labour Day. It is customary for labour activists to organize parades in cities and towns across Poland. The holiday is also commonly referred to as "Labour Day" (Polish: Święto Pracy).

In Poland, Labour Day is closely followed by both Polish National Flag Day on 2 May and May 3rd Constitution Day. These dates combined often result in a long weekend called Majówka, which may last for up to 9 days from 28 April to 6 May, at the cost of taking only 3 days off. People often travel, and Majówka is unofficially considered the start of barbecuing season in Poland. Together with and Constitution Day on 3 May – the latter also being a public holiday, coinciding with the Catholic holiday of The Most Holy Virgin Mary, Queen of Poland – it typically forms a long May weekend, referred to as majówka, widely regarded as the informal start of the spring outdoor leisure season. It is marked with picnics, barbecues, local events and travel. The day, however, does not force paid time off.

In Soviet times, streets, places, squares, parks and also factories were frequently named in honor of International Workers' Day, such as 1 Maja Coal Mine in Wodzisław Śląski.

==== Portugal ====
In Portugal, Workers' Day (Portuguese: Dia do Trabalhador) on 1 May was suppressed during the Estado Novo dictatorship. The first workers' day demonstration was held a week after the Carnation Revolution of 25 April 1974. It is still the largest demonstration in the history of Portugal. It is used as an opportunity for workers and workers' groups to voice their discontent over working conditions in demonstrations across Portugal, the largest being held in Lisbon. It is an official public holiday.

==== Romania ====
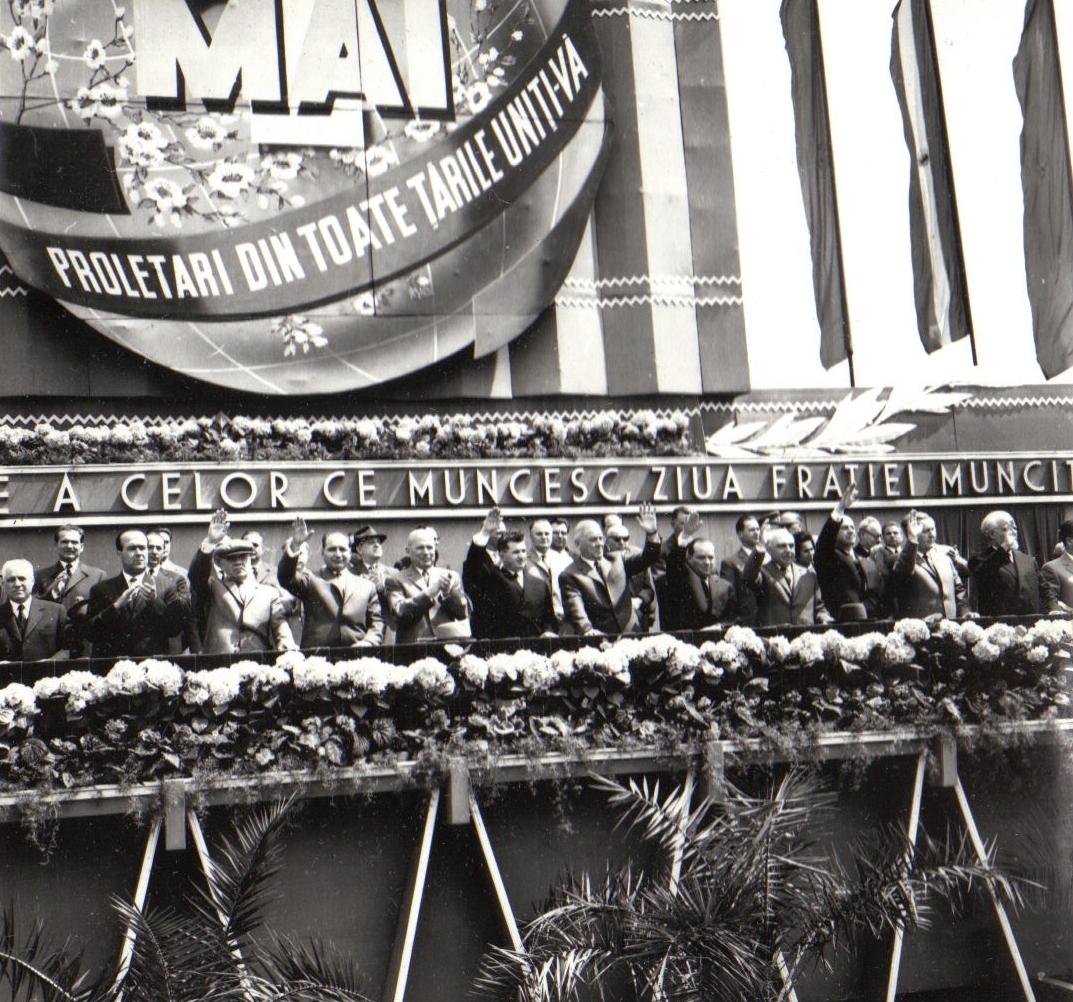
Delegates of the Romanian Communist Party on 1 May 1965

In Romania, 1 May, known as the "International Labour Day" (Romanian: Ziua internațională a muncii), the "International Workers' Day" (Ziua internațională a muncitorilor), or simply "1/First of May" (1/Întâi Mai), is an official public holiday. During the communist regime, like in all former Eastern Bloc countries, the day was marked by large state-organized parades in most towns and cities. After the Romanian Revolution of 1989, 1 May continues to be an official public holiday, but without any state organized events or parades. Most people celebrate together with friends and family, organising picnics and barbecues. It is also the first day of the year when people, especially those from the southeastern part of the country including the capital Bucharest, go to spend the day in one of the Romanian Black Sea resorts.

==== Russia ====
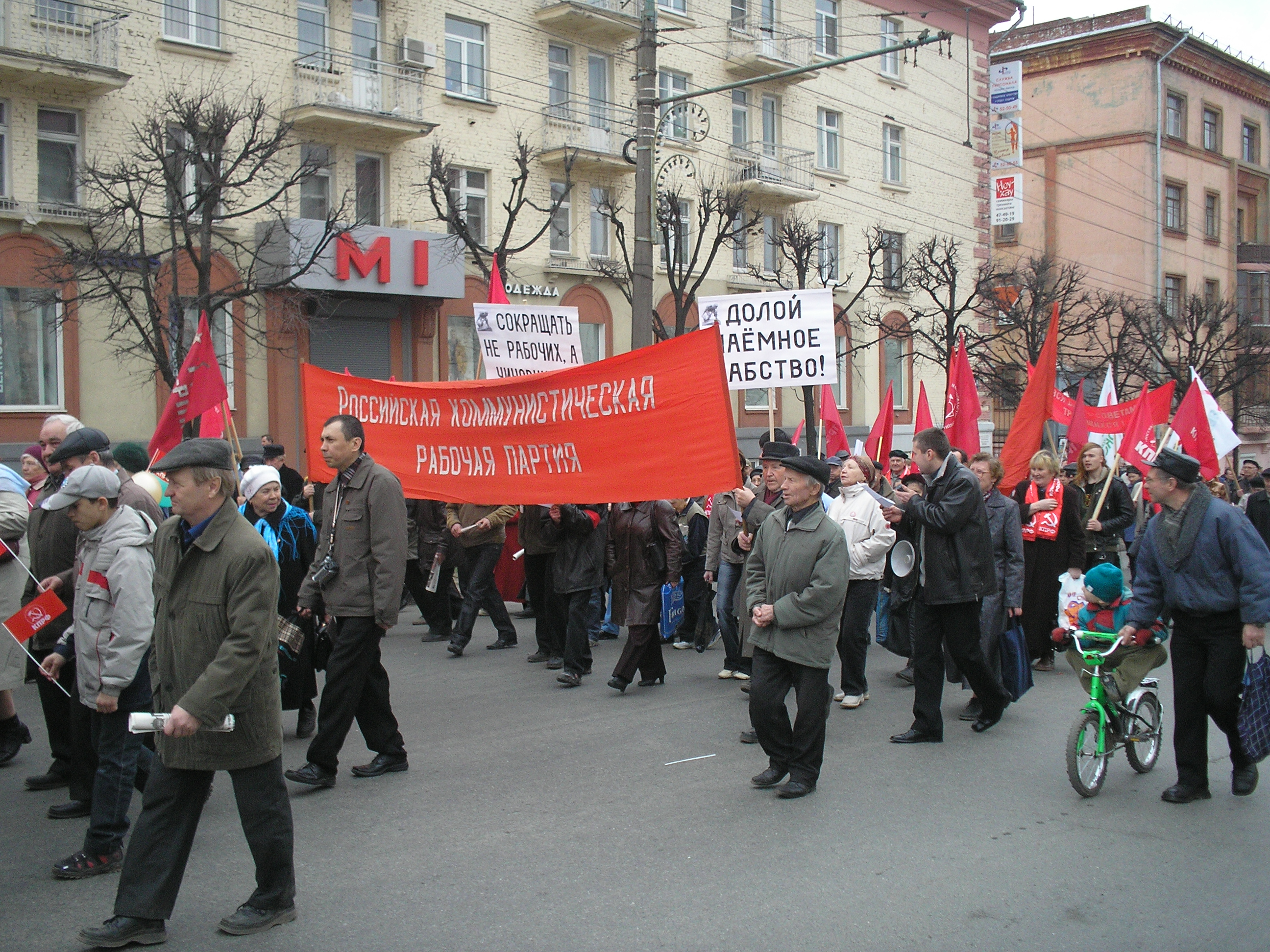
Russian Communist Workers' Party demonstration on 1 May 2008 in Izhevsk

In Russia, the "Day of International Workers Solidarity, the 1st of May" (Russian: День международной солидарности трудящихся Первое ма́я) was celebrated illegally in the country until the February Revolution enabled the first legal celebration in 1917. The following year, after the Bolshevik seizure of power, the International Workers' Day celebrations were boycotted by Mensheviks, Left Socialist Revolutionaries and anarchists. It became an important official holiday of the Soviet Union, celebrated with elaborate popular parade in the centre of the major cities. The biggest celebration was traditionally organized in Red Square, where the General Secretary of the CPSU and other party and government leaders stood atop Lenin's Mausoleum and waved to the crowds. The holiday was marked by military parades in Red Square. The following was the order of the march past:

- Parade commander holding the appointment of commanding officer of the Moscow Military District
- Corps of Drums of the Moscow Military Music College
- Frunze Military Academy
- V.I. Lenin Military Political Academy
- Felix Dzerzhinsky Artillery Academy
- Military Armored Forces Academy Marshal Rodion Malinovsky
- Military Engineering Academy
- Military Academy of Chemical Defense and Control
- Yuri Gagarin Air Force Academy
- Prof. Nikolai Zhukovsky Air Force Engineering Academy
- Delegation of naval officer cadets from the Soviet Navy
- 98th Guards Airborne Division
- Moscow Border Guards Institute of the Border Defence Forces of the KGB "Moscow City Council"
- Separate Operational Purpose Division
- 336th Marine Brigade of the Baltic Fleet
- Suvorov Military School and Nakhimov Naval Schools
- Moscow Military Combined Arms Command Training School "Supreme Soviet of the Russian SFSR"
- Mobile Column
  - 2nd Guards Motor Rifle Division
  - 4th Guards Tank Division
  - Missile Troops and Artillery of the Moscow Military District
  - 1st Aerospace Defense Army
  - Northern Fleet and Baltic Fleet Coastal Defense, Surface and Submarine Forces (until 1974)
- Massed Bands of the Moscow Military District (parade finale)

The first of these parades were held 1918, when Vladimir Lenin presided over a ceremony at Khodynka Field. Notable parades included the parade of 1941 (which saw the presence of a Wehrmacht delegation led by Ernst August Köstring) and 1963 (where Cuban leader Fidel Castro was a guest). The only parades on 1 May to be cancelled were the parades scheduled during the years of the Second World War and the 1965 parade (this was cancelled to make way for the 1965 Moscow Victory Day Parade nine days later). In 1979, ten years after the last annual parade, a brief exhibition drill and military tattoo of the forces of the Moscow Garrison took place.

In 1991, which preceded the last year that demonstrations were held in Red Square, International Workers' Day grew into high-spirited political action. Around 50,000 people participated in a rally in Red Square in 1991 after which the tradition was interrupted for 13 years. In the early post-Soviet period the holiday turned into massive political gatherings of supporters of radically minded politicians. For instance, an action dubbed as "a rally of communist-oriented organisations" was held in Red Square in 1992. The rally began with performance of the Soviet Union anthem and raising the Red Flag and ended with appeals from the leader of opposition movement Working Moscow, Viktor Anpilov, "for early dismissal of President Boris Yeltsin, ousting Moscow Mayor Gavriil Popov from power and putting the latter on trial". Since 1992, International Workers' Day is officially called "Spring and Labor Day", and remains a major holiday in present-day Russia.

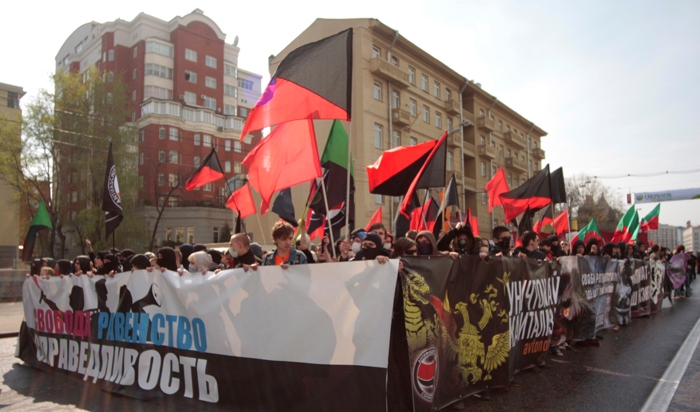
Labour Day 2010 in Moscow: anarchist demonstration

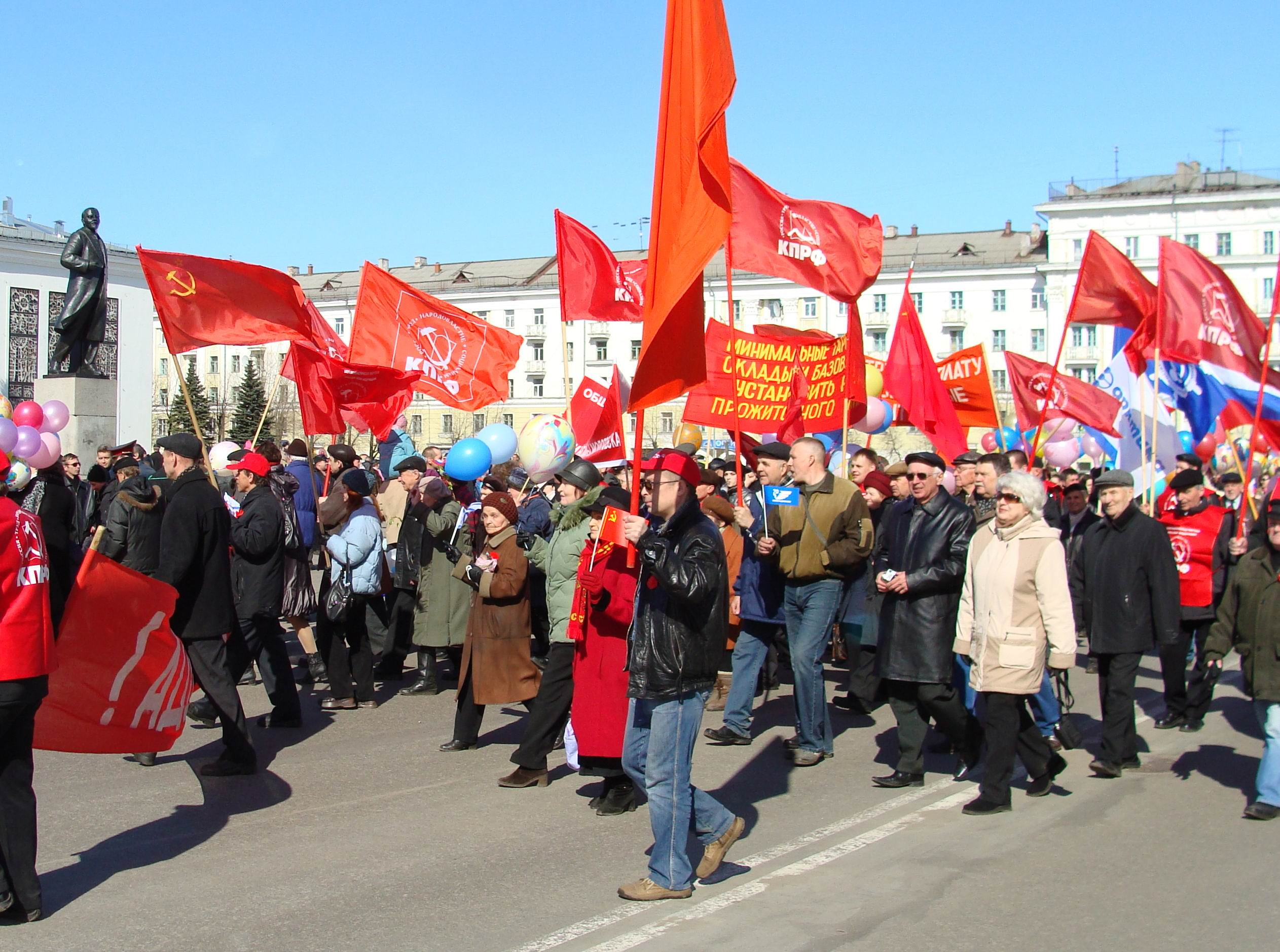
Labour Day 2009 in Severodvinsk: red flags and social slogans visible

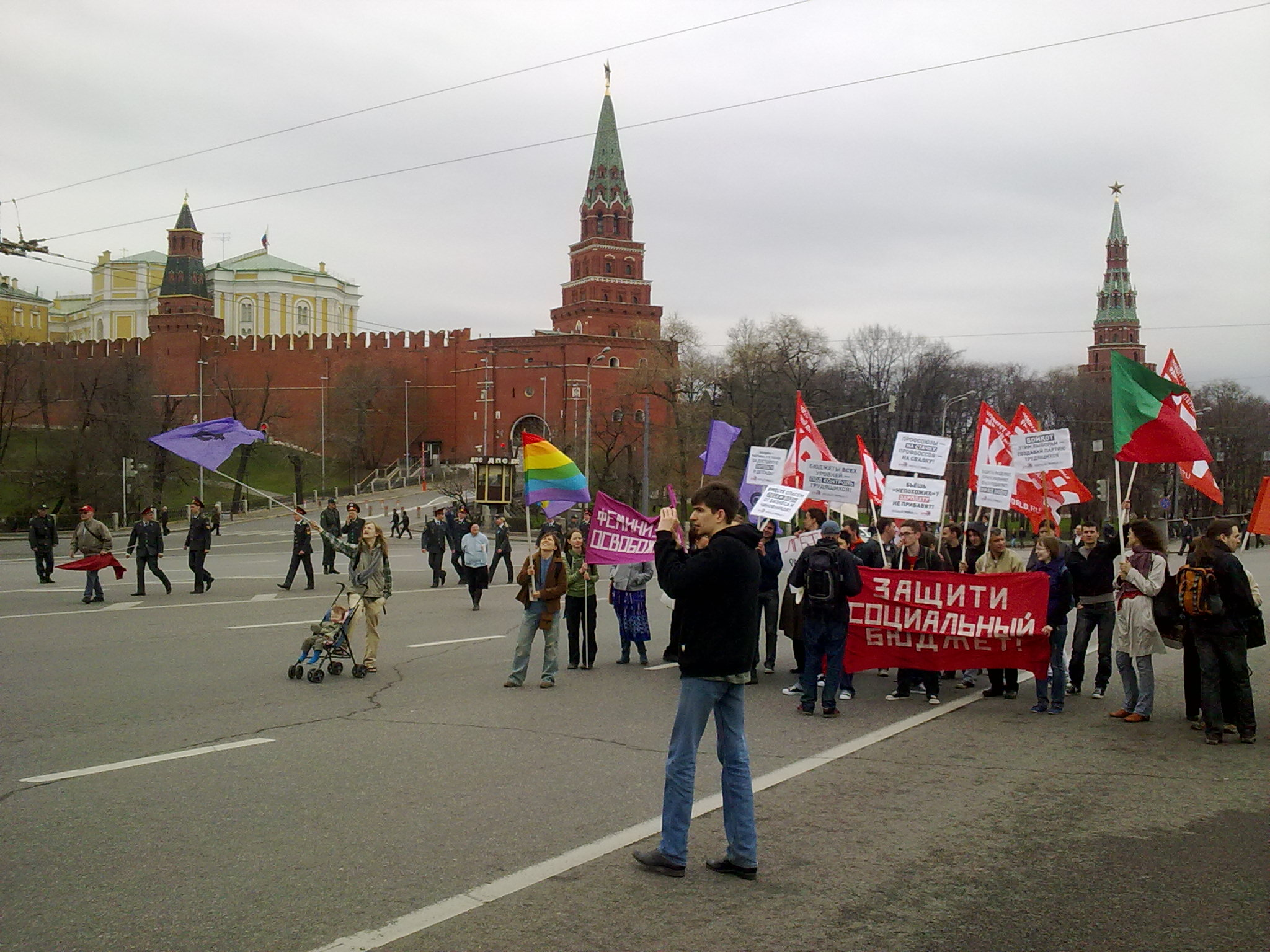
Column of "democratic left" at the 2011 Labor Day march in Moscow: LevSD, Committee for a Workers' International, LGBT, feminists

In 1993, a Moscow Labor Day rally followed by a procession organized by the National Salvation Front, Labor Moscow, and the Communist Party of the Russian Federation turned into clashes between demonstrators and riot police near houses 30 and 37 along Leninsky Avenue. (Note: The clashes were preceded by two circumstances: "the organizers deviated from the route allowed by the mayor's office," and the Moscow authorities decided to "obstruct the movement of the column along Leninsky Avenue." Subsequently, the authorities failed to rationally justify such a decision: the movement took place in the direction from the city center. The version that "the demonstrators are going to smash Gorbachev's dacha" remained unconfirmed. The demonstrators, who were moving along Leninsky Avenue from Oktyabrskaya Square, noticing the truck barriers, as well as the cordon of police officers and OMON, reorganized, putting forward a vanguard of 500–600 people, the most organized part of which was the squad of the National Salvation Front. A few tens of meters before the cordon, the column stepped up and almost immediately broke through the cordon. See the cited report by Memorial.)

After the demonstrators broke through the cordon, OMON went on a counterattack near house 37 along Leninsky Avenue. "The demonstrators fought fiercely using banner poles." To overcome the barriers, the demonstrators used trucks as rams. One of the rams resulted in severe injuries to OMON Sergeant Vladimir Tolokneyev, who died four days later. Media reports on the number of victims varied: the initial figure of 150 people soon quadrupled.

1 May is celebrated annually by communists, anarchists, and other organizations as the Day of International Solidarity of Workers. These events are accompanied by the promotion of sharp social and political slogans ("Government of bankrupts – resign!", "WE do not want to pay for YOUR crisis!", "Self-organization! Self-government! Self-defense!" etc.).

The Spring and Labor Day, celebrated as a state holiday, is usually used for political actions under independent slogans by trade unions, parties, and movements of various orientations, from the left to the far right: United Russia (together with the Federation of Independent Trade Unions of Russia and the Young Guard of United Russia), A Just Russia, the Communist Party of the Russian Federation, Yabloko, Solidarnost, the Liberal Democratic Party of Russia, and Autonomous Action.

The slogans of official events organized by the authorities are far from the historical roots of the Labour Day demonstrations: "Putin's plan is a plan for Victory!", "Bonuses for pensioners", "Three kids in a family is the norm!".

A more radical attitude to the holiday in 2009 was expressed by the head of the metropolitan branch of the Right Cause party, Igor Trunov: "To be honest, I didn't really want to celebrate 1 May, because I don't stand in solidarity with the workers of Chicago, where this holiday came from".

On 1 May 2013, several hundred thousand workers took to the streets of Russian cities. More than 100,000 people took part in the Labour Day demonstration in Moscow.

Since 2014 a national civil parade has been held on 1 May on Red Square, with similar events held in major cities and regional capitals.

In 2016, the celebration of Easter and Labour Day overlapped, which led to the abandonment of Labour Day events in some regions.

==== Serbia ====
In Serbia, 1 May (and also 2 May) is a day off work and a day out of school. It is one of the major popular holidays, and the only official holiday from socialist times that is still officially celebrated. People celebrate it all over the country. By tradition 1 May is celebrated by countryside picnics and outdoor barbecues. May is marked by warm weather in Serbia. In Belgrade, the capital, most people go to Avala or Košutnjak, which are parks located in Rakovica and Čukarica. People go around the country to enjoy nature. A major religious holiday of Djurdjevdan is on 6 May so quite often days off work are given to connect these two holidays and weekend, creating a small spring break. 1 May is celebrated by most of the population regardless of political views.

==== Slovakia ====
In Slovakia, 1 May is an official holiday. Celebrations are held surrounding workers' day but are also connected with the commemoration of the entry of the Slovak Republic into the European Union (1 May 2004).

==== Slovenia ====
In Slovenia, 1 May and 2 May are public holidays. There are many official events all over the country to celebrate workers' day. In Ljubljana, the capital, the main celebration is held on Rožnik Hill in the city. On the night of 30 April, bonfires are traditionally burned.

==== Spain ====
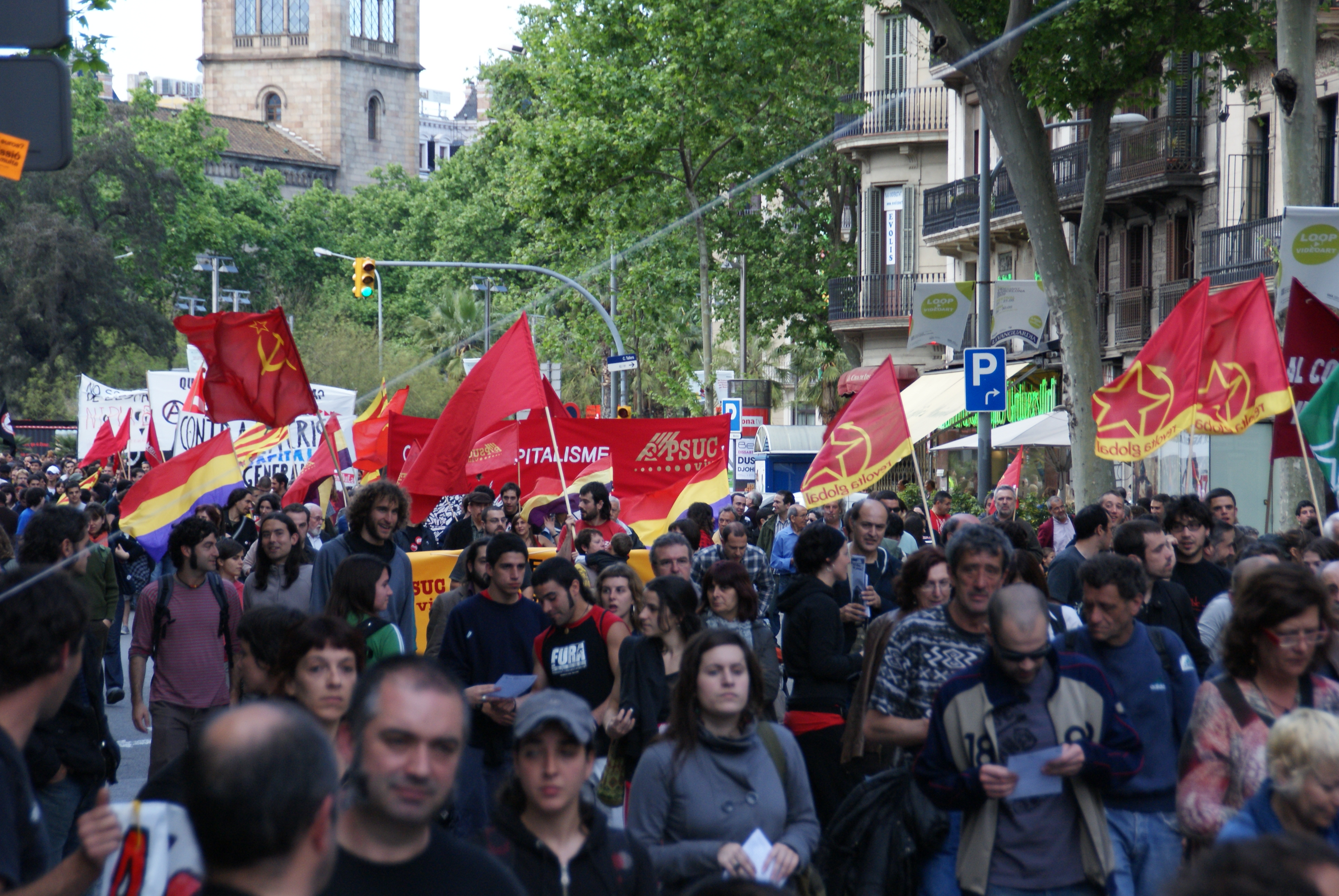
Labor Day rally in Barcelona, Spain

In Spain, the first Workers' Day (Día del Trabajador) was celebrated in 1889 but only became a public holiday with the beginning of the Spanish Second Republic in 1931. It was banned afterwards by the Franco regime in 1937. The year after it was decreed that the "Fiesta de la Exaltación del Trabajo," or Labor Festival, be held on 18 July, the anniversary of the Francoist military coup, instead. After the death of Francisco Franco in 1975 and the move towards democracy, the first large rallies on 1 May began again in 1977. It was re-introduced as a public holiday in 1978. Commonly, peaceful demonstrations and parades occur in major and minor cities.

==== Sweden ====
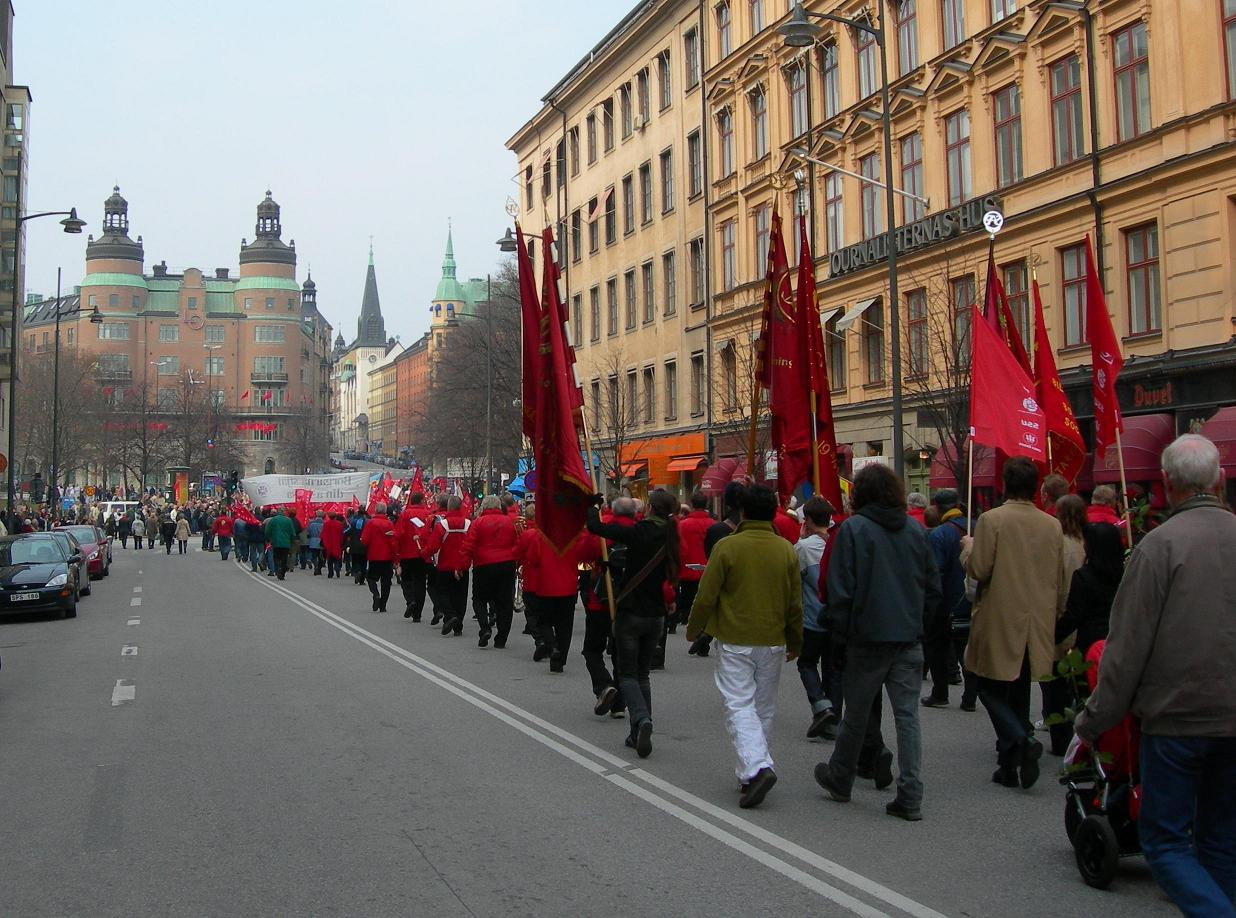
Swedish Social Democratic Party at International Workers' Day demonstration in Stockholm, Sweden, in 2006. The party has dominated Swedish politics for nearly a century. The trade union palace in Stockholm is seen at the end of the picture.

1 May has been an important part of Swedish history since the late 19th century. The day was made a public holiday in 1938 but had been celebrated by the Swedish Social Democratic Party and the left since 1890. The first International Workers' Day celebration gathered more than 50,000 people in central Stockholm. The crowd went to hear speeches by the leading figures in the Swedish labour movement such as Hjalmar Branting (later prime minister), August Palm and Hinke Bergegren. During World War I the demonstrations mainly had a peace message and the Liberal Party also joined the demonstrations. The eight-hour working day and women's suffrage were the principal themes during the troubled times after World War I.

Recognizing the central contributions of workers and international worker solidarity in Swedish social, economic, political and cultural development, International Workers' Day demonstrations are an important part of Swedish politics and culture for social democrats and democratic socialists. In Stockholm the Social Democratic Party always marches towards Norra Bantorget, the historical, physical centre of the Swedish labour movement, where they hold speeches in front of the headquarters of the Swedish Trade Union Confederation, while the smaller Left Party marches in larger numbers towards Kungsträdgården.

Since 1967, the Communist Party and its youth wing, Revolutionary Communist Youth, have held their own International Workers' Day march, known as Röd Front ('Red Front'). In 2016, Röd Front marches were held at 33 locations across the country. The largest Röd Front marches are usually held in the industrial and financial port town of Gothenburg, Sweden's second-largest city and one of the party's strongholds.

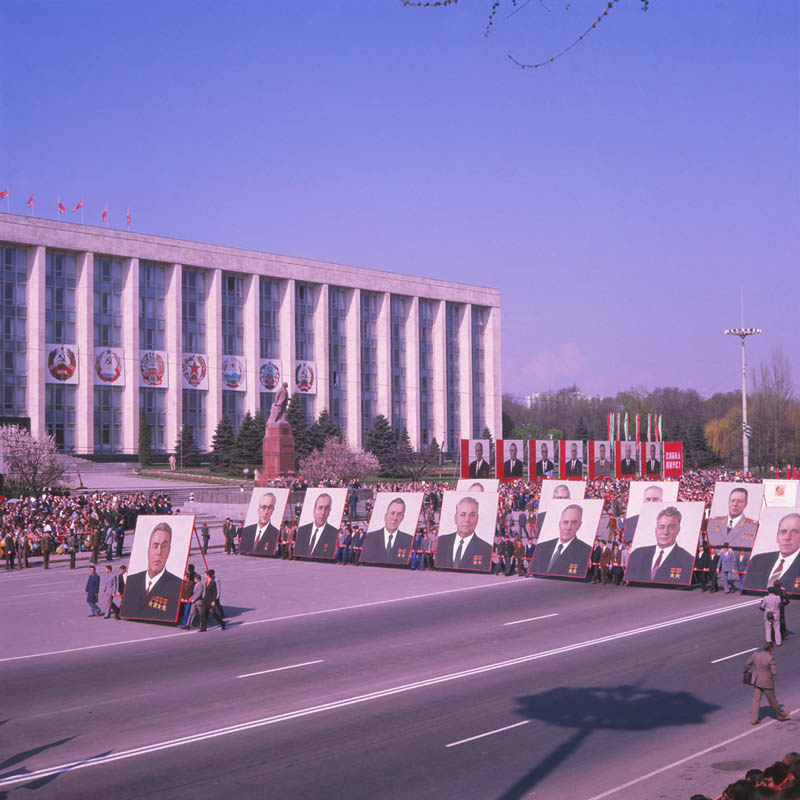
International Workers' Day in the Moldavian Soviet Socialist Republic in the 1970s

==== Switzerland ====
In Switzerland, the status of 1 May differs depending on the canton and sometimes on the municipality. Labour Day is known as Tag der Arbeit in German-speaking cantons, as Fête du travail in the French-speaking cantons, and as Festa del lavoro in the Italian-speaking canton of Ticino.

- In the cantons of Basel-Landschaft, Basel-Stadt, Jura, Neuchâtel, and Zürich, Labour Day is an official public holiday equal to Sundays, based on federal law (Bundesgesetz über die Arbeit in Industrie, Gewerbe und Handel, article 20a).
- In the cantons of Schaffhausen, Thurgau, and Ticino, Labour Day is an official "day off" (Ruhetag). This is equal in practice to an official public holiday, but is not based on federal law and cantonal regulations may differ in details.
- In the canton of Solothurn it is an official half-day holiday (starting at 12 noon).
- In the canton of Fribourg, public servants get the afternoon off, many companies follow this practice. It is traditional for children to sing at people's doors in exchange for sweets and money.
- In the canton of Aargau it is not an official holiday, but most employees get the afternoon off.
- In the municipalities of Hildisrieden and Schüpfheim (both in the canton of Lucerne) as well as in Muotathal (canton of Schwyz), 1 May is an official public holiday, but as commemoration day of the local patron saint, not as Labour Day. In the other parts of the cantons of Lucerne and Schwyz, 1 May is a regular work day.
- In all other cantons, 1 May is a regular work day.

The largest Labour Day celebrations in Switzerland are held in the city of Zürich. Each year, Zürich's 1 May committee, together with the Swiss Federation of Trade Unions, organizes a festival and 1 May rally. It is the largest rally held on a regular basis in Switzerland.

==== Turkey ====
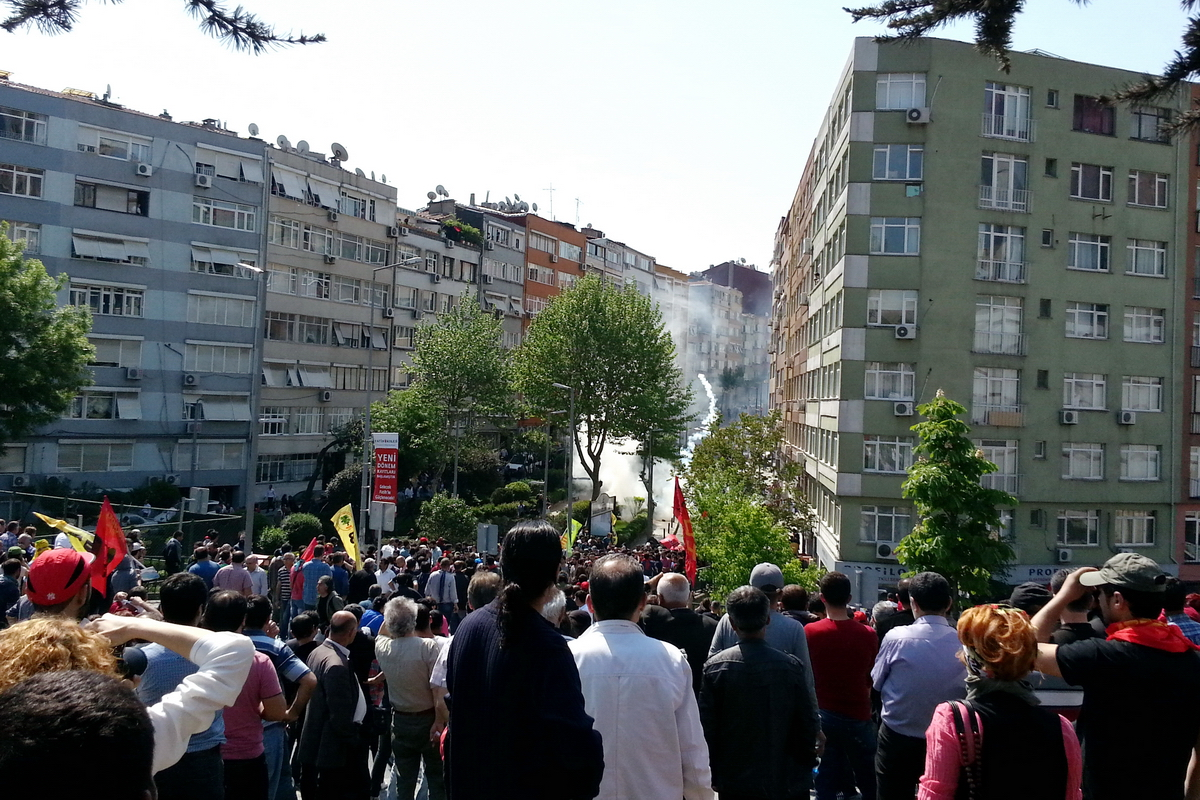
Istanbul May Day clashes in 2013

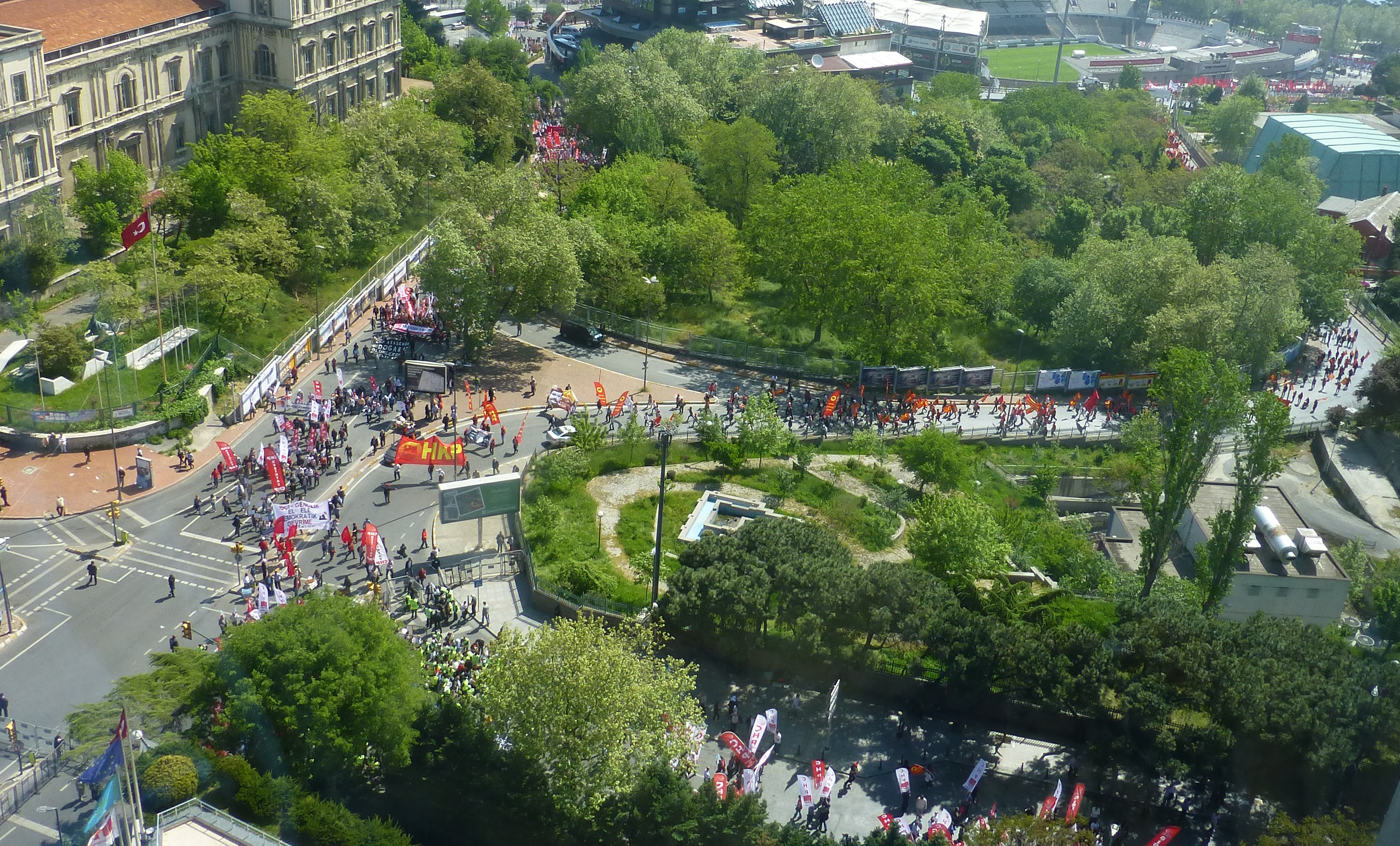
Workers marching to Taksim Square, 1 May 2012

1 May is an official holiday celebrated in Turkey. It was a holiday as "Spring Day" until 1981 when it was canceled after the 1980 coup d'état. In 2009, the Turkish government restored the holiday after some casualties and demonstrations. Taksim Square is the centre of the celebrations due to the Taksim Square massacre.

Workers' Day was first celebrated in 1912 in Istanbul and in 1899 in İzmir. After the establishment of the Turkish Republic in 1923, the celebrations continued. In 1924, it was forbidden by a decree of the Kemalist government in both 1924 and 1925, demonstrations were intervened by arm floats. In 1935, The National Assembly declared 1 May as "Spring Day" to be a public holiday.

During the events leading to the 1980 Turkish coup d'état, a massacre occurred on 1 May 1977 (Taksim Square massacre), in which unknown people (agents provocateurs) opened fire on the crowd. The crowd was the biggest in Turkish workers' history with the number of people approximating 500,000. In the next two years, provocations and confusion continued and peaked before the 1980 coup d'état. The 1 May holiday was cancelled after the coup d'état. Still, demonstrations continued with small crowds, and in 1996, three people were killed by police bullets, and a plain-clothes man who spied in the crowd was revealed and lynched by workers. On the same evening, a video broadcast on TV showed that two participants in the demonstration were lynched by far right-wing nationalist groups and this lynching occurred in front of police forces who were watching the scene with happy faces. Thus, 1 May 1996 has been remembered by workers' movements.

In 2007, the 30th anniversary of the Taksim Square Massacre, leftist workers' unions wanted to commemorate the massacre in Taksim Square. Since the government would not let them into the square, 580–700 people were stopped and 1 person died under police control. After these events, the government declared 1 May as "Work and Solidarity Day" but not as a holiday. In the next year, the day was declared as a holiday, but people were still not allowed to gather in Taksim Square. The year 2008 was remembered with police violence in Istanbul. Police fired tear gas grenades among the crowds, and into hospitals and a primary school. Workers pushed forward so that thousands gathered in Taksim in 2011.

In Turkey, "Labour and Solidarity Day" (Turkish: Emek ve Dayanışma Günü) became an official holiday in 2009. A turning point came in 2009, when the Turkish government, led by Prime Minister Recep Tayyip Erdoğan, officially recognized 1 May as a public holiday again. Demonstrations at Taksim Square carry historical significance due to the Taksim Square Massacre on 1 May 1977.

After three years of peaceful meetings in 2013, meetings in Taksim Square were forbidden by the government. Clashes occurred between police and workers; water cannon and tear gas have been widely used.

==== Ukraine ====
International Workers' Day is a public holiday in Ukraine, inherited from the Soviet era. The 1st May as a day of workers' solidarity in Kyiv began as early as 1894. Until 2018, 2 May was also a public holiday (as in the Soviet era), instead in 2017 Western Christianity's Christmas celebrated 25 December became a new Ukrainian public holiday. The 1 May International Workers' Day remained a Ukrainian public holiday, although it was renamed (also in 2017) from "Day of International Solidarity of Workers" to "Labour Day".

In 2015, the Communist Party's Labor Day rallies were banned in Kyiv and Kharkiv.

Late May 2015 laws that ban communist symbols came into effect in Ukraine, thus banning communist symbols, singing the Soviet national hymn or the Internationale.

According to Interior Minister Arsen Avakov during the 2016 International Workers' Day rallies in some major cities the number of police officers far outnumbered the number of rally participants. With in Dnipro 193 policemen protecting 25 rally participants.

==== United Kingdom ====
A public bank holiday in the United Kingdom was created in 1978. It is called the "Early May bank holiday" and is held on the first Monday in May each year.

=== Oceania ===
==== Australia ====
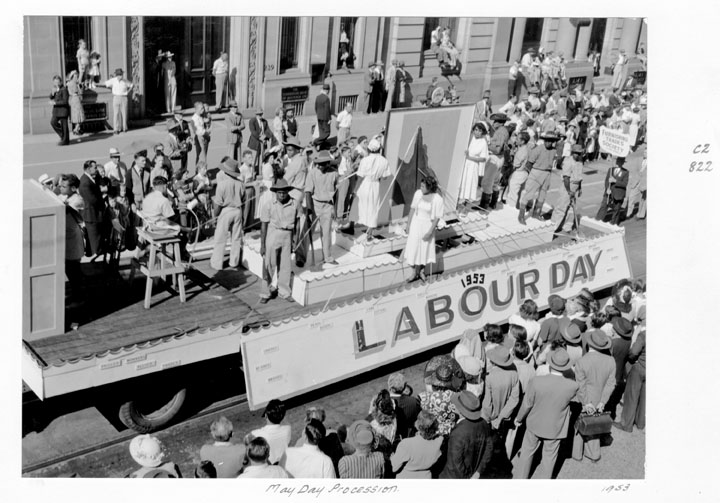
A Labour Day procession in Queensland, 1953

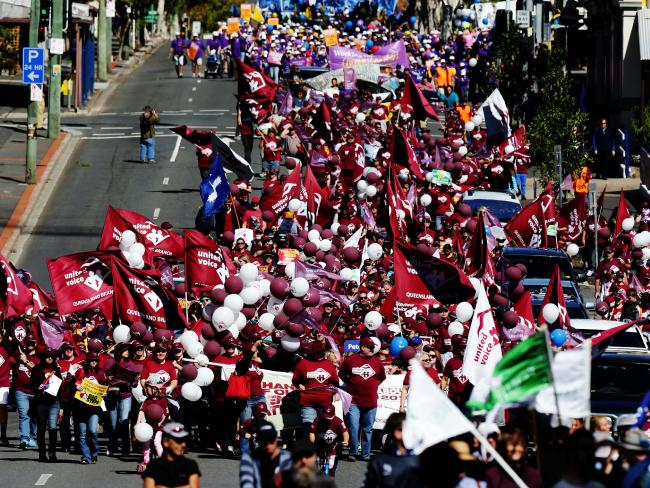
The Labour Day March in Brisbane, Queensland, is the largest rally in Australia.

Labour Day is a public holiday in Australia on dates which vary between states and territories. In some states the date commemorates the Eight Hours Day march (see below). It is the first Monday in October in the Australian Capital Territory, New South Wales and South Australia. In Victoria and Tasmania, it is the second Monday in March (though the latter calls it the Eight Hours Day). In Western Australia, Labour Day is the first Monday in March. In Queensland and the Northern Territory, Labour Day occurs on the first Monday in May (though the latter calls it May Day). It is on the fourth Monday of March in the territory of Christmas Island.

In Victoria, the first march for an eight-hour day by the labour movement occurred in Melbourne on 21 April 1856. On this day, stonemasons and building workers on building sites around Melbourne stopped work and marched from the University of Melbourne to Parliament House to achieve an eight-hour day. Their direct action protest was a success, and they are noted as being among the first organised workers in the world to achieve an eight-hour day, with no loss of pay.

In Queensland, Labour Day was first celebrated with a public holiday in Queensland in 1865 as Eight Hours Celebration Day. It occurred on 1 March (Saint David's Day) and celebrated the winning of an eight-hour work day by Brisbane workers in 1858. One of the first Labour Day marches occurred in Queensland on 1 May 1891. The date was moved to May Day around 1896, in solidarity with the attack on United States workers on the first May Day parade in the Haymarket affair. In 1901, the holiday was moved to the first Monday in May, to ensure a long weekend.

In the Northern Territory, Labour Day is a public holiday on the first Monday in May.

==== New Zealand ====
New Zealand workers were among the first in the world to claim the right for an eight-hour working day when, in 1840, the carpenter Samuel Parnell won an eight-hour day in Wellington. Labour Day was first celebrated in New Zealand on 28 October 1890, which marked the first anniversary of the Maritime Council, an organisation of transport and mining unions. Several thousand trade union members and supporters attended parades in the main city centres. Government employees were given the day off to attend, and many businesses closed for at least part of the day. Initially, the day was variously called Labour Day or Labour Demonstration Day. The government legislated that the day be a public holiday through the Labour Day Act of 1899. The day was set as the second Wednesday in October and first celebrated the following year, in 1900. In 1910, the holiday was moved to the fourth Monday in October.

Labour Day (Māori: Te Rā Whakanui i ngā Kaimahi) is a public holiday in New Zealand and is still held on the fourth Monday in October. Its origins are traced to the eight-hour working day movement that arose in the newly founded Wellington colony in 1840, primarily because of carpenter Samuel Duncan Parnell's refusal to work more than eight hours a day. That year, Parnell reportedly told a prospective employer: "There are twenty-four hours per day given us; eight of these should be for work, eight for sleep, and the remaining eight for recreation".

=== Central Asia ===
==== Tajikistan ====
Labour Day was celebrated on 1 May in the Soviet Union, and the tradition lives on in Tajikistan as International Labour Day Although Labour Day is a working day, folk festivals, performances and fairs organised throughout the country create a holiday atmosphere.

=== South Asia ===
==== Bangladesh ====
In Bangladesh, 1 May is a public holiday and called International Workers' Solidarity Day. A parade and other events are held on the day to commemorate the occasion.

Bangladesh Garment Sramik Sanghati, an organisation working for the welfare of garment workers, has requested that 24 April be declared Labour Safety Day in Bangladesh, in memory of the victims of the 2013 Rana Plaza collapse.

==== India ====
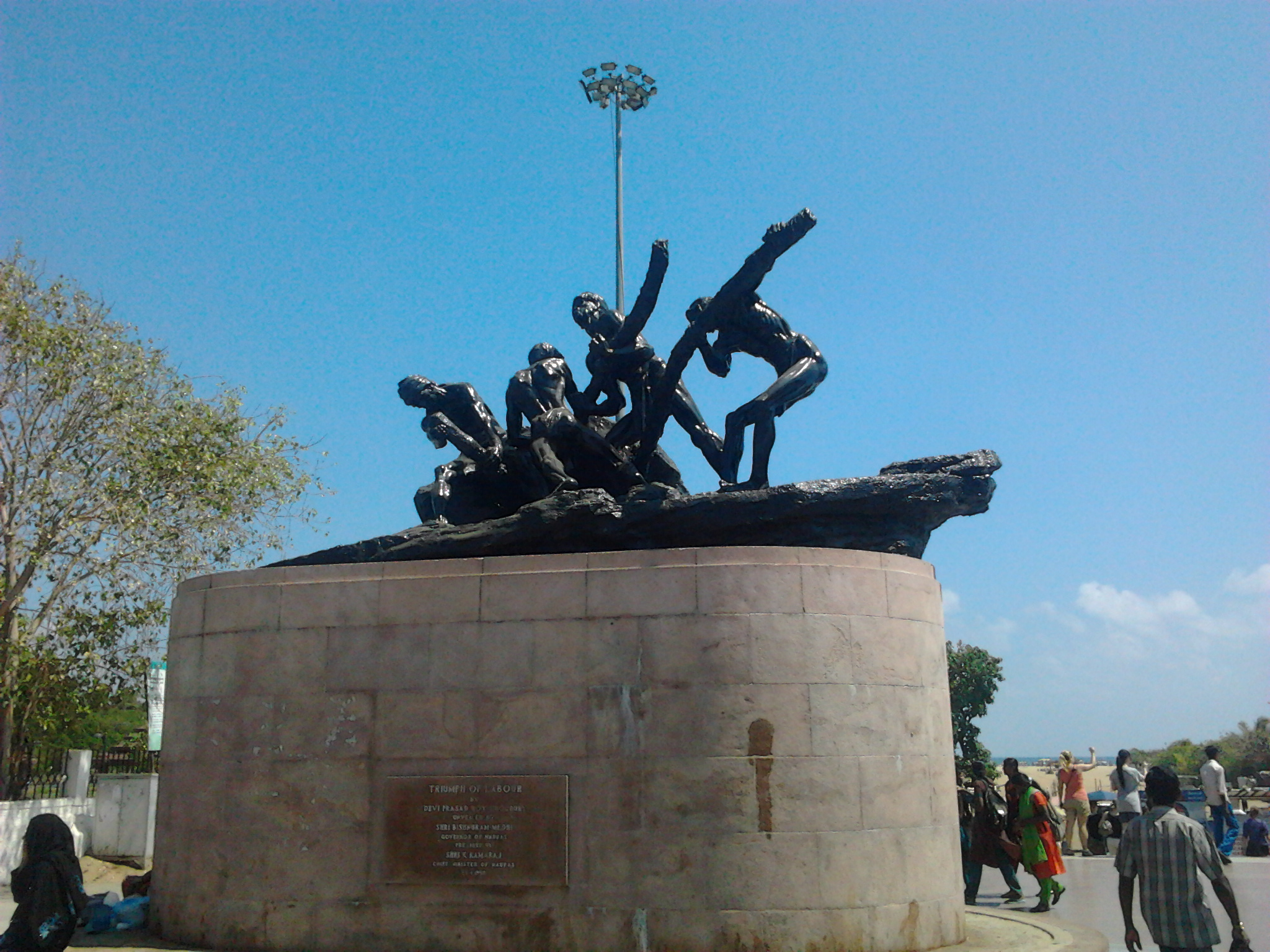
Triumph of Labour at the Marina Beach in Chennai

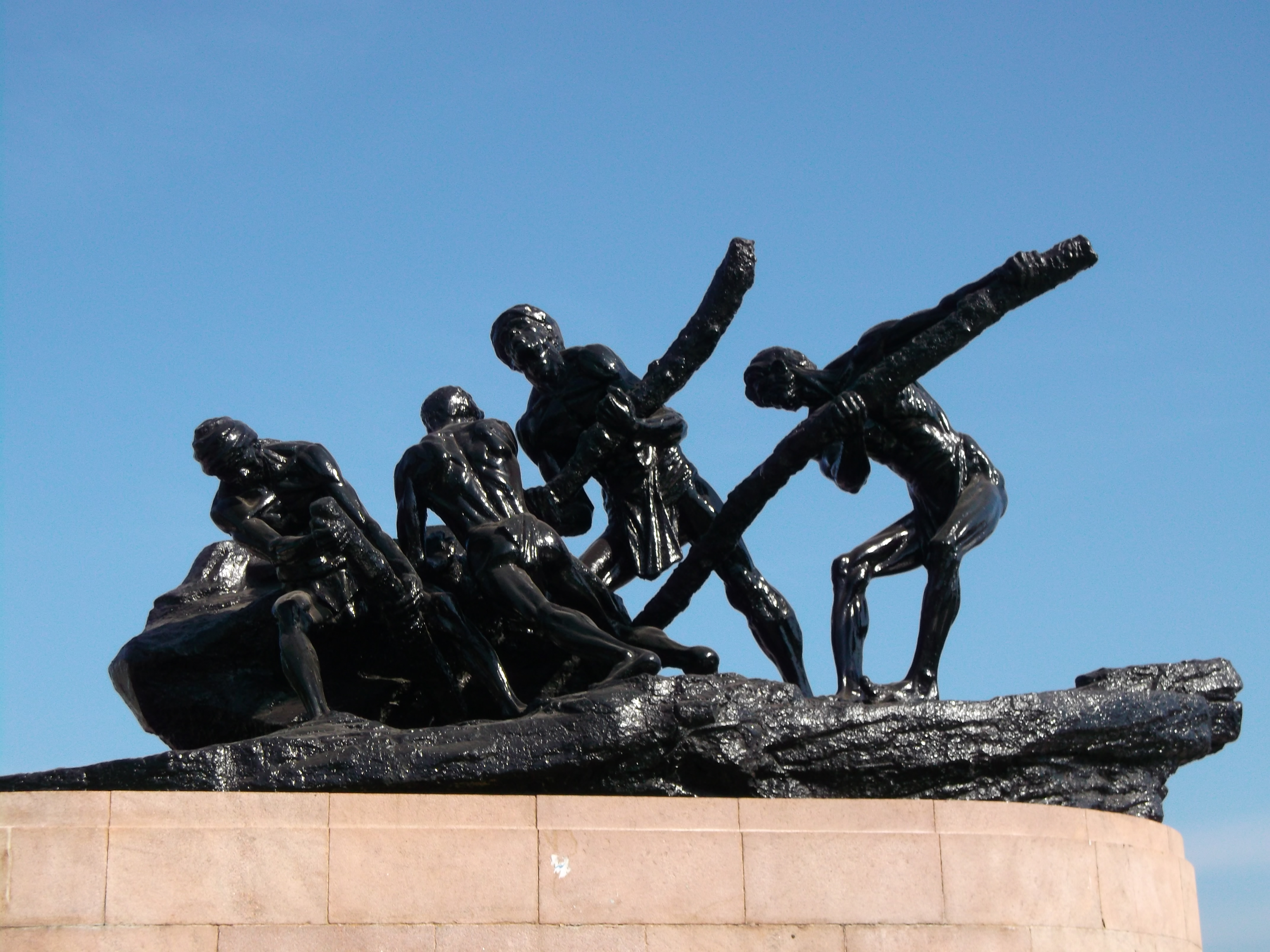
Triumph of Labour statue at Marina Beach in Chennai, Tamil Nadu

In India, Labour Day is a not a public holiday on 1 May. The International Workers' Day is tied to labour movements for communist and socialist political parties. Labour Day is known as "Uzhaipalar dhinam" in Tamil and was first celebrated in Madras, "Kamgar Din" in Hindi, "Karmikara Dinacharane" in Kannada, "Karmika Dinotsavam" in Telugu, "Kamgar Divas" in Marathi, "Thozhilaali Dinam" in Malayalam and "Shromik Dibosh" in Bengali. Since Labour day is not a national holiday, Labour day is observed as public holiday at State Government's discretion. Many parts especially in North Indian States it is not a public holiday.

The first celebration in India was organized in Madras (now Chennai) by the Labour Kisan Party of Hindustan on 1 May 1923. This was also the first time the red flag was used in India. The party leader Singaravelu Chettiar made arrangements to celebrate International Workers' Day in two places in 1923. One meeting was held at the beach opposite to the Madras High Court; the other meeting was held at the Triplicane beach. The Hindu newspaper, published from Madras reported,

The Labour Kisan party has introduced May Day celebrations in Madras. Comrade Singaravelar presided over the meeting. A resolution was passed stating that the government should declare May Day as a holiday. The president of the party explained the non-violent principles of the party. There was a request for financial aid. It was emphasised that workers of the world must unite to achieve independence.

1 May is also celebrated as "Maharashtra Day" and "Gujarat Day" to mark the date in 1960, when the two western states attained statehood after the erstwhile Bombay State was divided on linguistic lines. Maharashtra Day is held at Shivaji Park in central Mumbai. Schools and offices in Maharashtra remain closed on 1 May. A similar parade is held to celebrate Gujarat Day in Gandhinagar.

Vaiko (Vai Gopalsamy), General Secretary of Marumalarchi Dravida Munnetra Kazhagam, appealed to the then Prime Minister V. P. Singh to declare 1 May as a national holiday, to which the PM heeded and from then on it became a national holiday to celebrate International Labour Day.

==== Maldives ====
Maldives first observed the holiday in 2011, after a declaration by President Mohamed Nasheed. He noted that this move highlighted the government's commitment as well as efforts of private parties to protect and promote workers' rights in the Maldives.

==== Nepal ====
International Workers' Day was first observed in Nepal since 1962. The day became a public holiday in 2007.

==== Pakistan ====
International Labour Day is observed in Pakistan on 1 May to commemorate the social and economic achievements of workers. It is a public and national holiday. Many organized street demonstrations take place on Labour Day (also known as Youm-e-Mazdoor) in which workers and labour unions protest against labour repression and demand more rights, better wages and benefits.

Labour Day, or Youm-e-Mazdoor, was officially declared a holiday in 1972 under Prime Minister Zulfikar Ali Bhutto, it was part of the country's first labour policy, which also introduced welfare initiatives for workers. Government offices, banks, and many businesses remain closed in observance.

==== Sri Lanka ====
In Sri Lanka, International Workers' Day was declared a public, bank, and mercantile holiday in 1956. Rallies are held in the capital, Colombo.

=== Southeast Asia ===
==== Cambodia ====
In Cambodia, it is known as International Labour Day and is a public holiday. No marches for labour day were permitted in Cambodia for several years after the 2013 Cambodian general election and surrounding mass protests. A tightly controlled march on a limited scale was first permitted again in 2019.

==== Indonesia ====
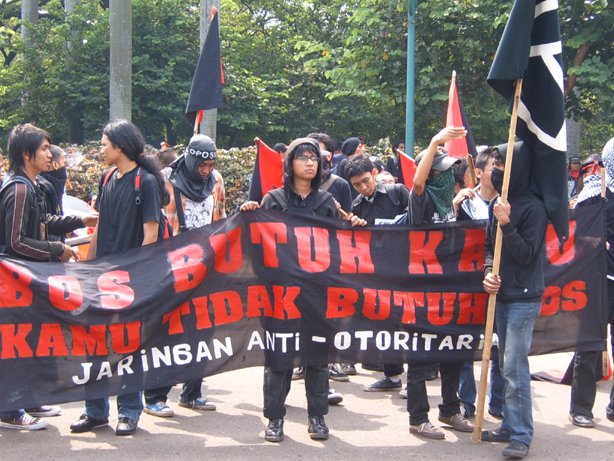
Anarchists demonstration in Jakarta, 2007

International Workers' Day, or Labour Day, in Indonesia was first observed by Kung Tang Hwee labour union in Semarang on 1918. The organizations such as Sarekat Islam, Boedi Oetomo, and Insulinde also took parts on strike that day through Radicale Concentratie alliance. But in 1927 the celebrations banned by the Dutch East Indies colonial government.

After independence, the 1 May Labour Day was observed again from 1946, with Soekarno, the first president of the Republic, always attending the celebration. Two years later, he signed Law No. 12 of 1948 concerning workers' rights. The Soeharto New Order regime banned Labour Day celebrations again from 1967 because of the day's association with Marxist and communist movements. The regime changed Labour Day to 20 February from 1973, marking the day on which all labour unions were merged by the government into the All Indonesian Federation of Workers (now Confederation of All Indonesian Workers' Unions).

After the fall of the New Order, the day began celebrated again as a day for protests by labourers and workers. The day was officially made a public holiday in 2014. Every year on the day, labourers and students take over the streets in major cities across the country, voicing their demands for better income and supportive policies from the government.

==== Malaysia ====
Malaysia began observing the holiday in 1972 following an announcement by the late Malaysian Deputy Prime Minister, Ismail Abdul Rahman. Also known as May Day, this public holiday is sometimes celebrated with groups organising parades, rallies or both, to promote and protect workers' rights.

==== Myanmar ====
In Myanmar, 1 May is known as Labour Day (Burmese: အလုပ်သမားနေ့) and is a public holiday.

==== Philippines ====
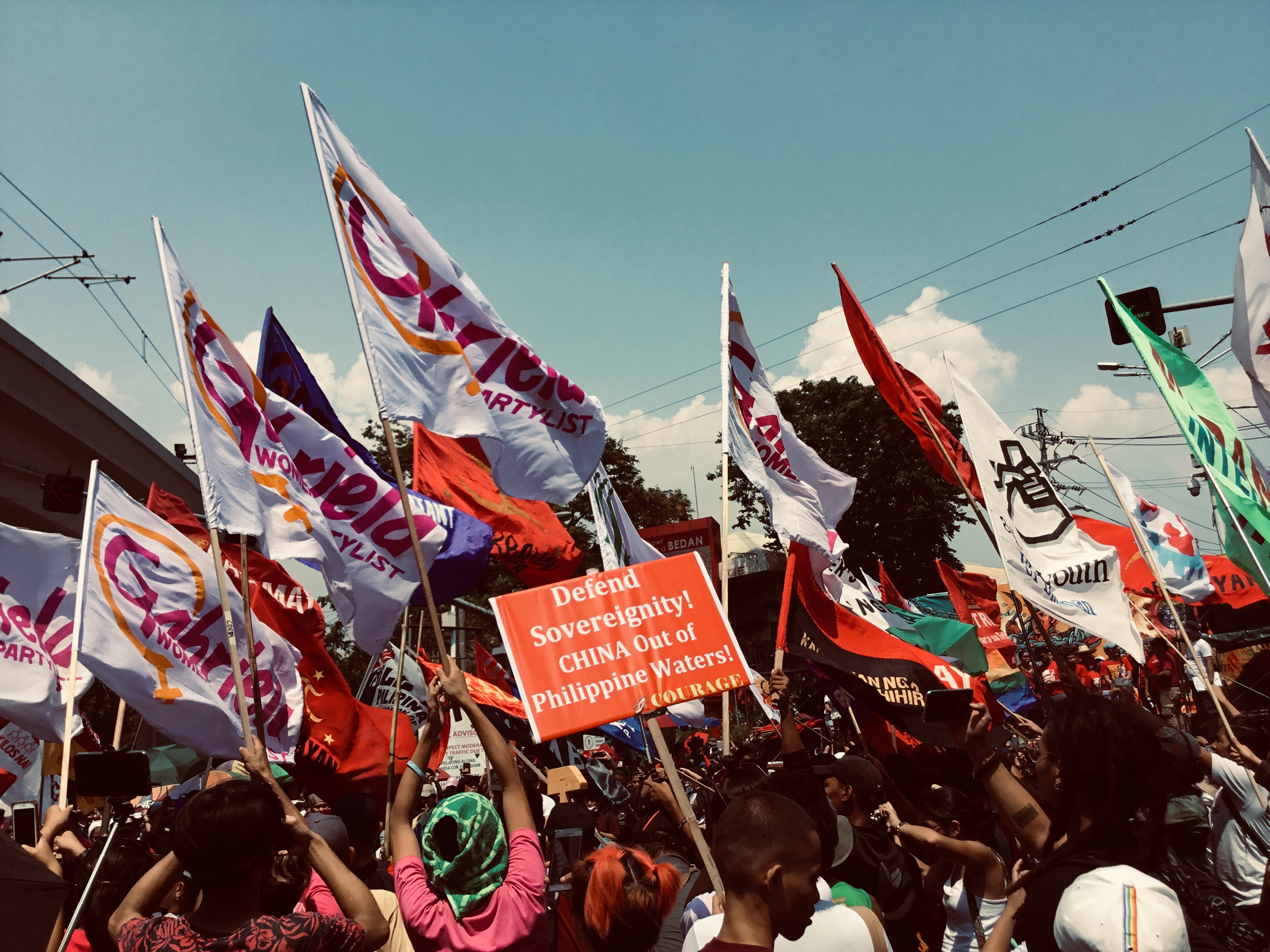
A Labor Day protest in Manila in 2019

1 May is known as "Labor Day" (Filipino: Araw ng Manggagawa, also known as Araw ng Paggawa) and is a public holiday in the Philippines. On this day, labour organizations and unions hold protests in major cities. On 1 May 1903, during the American colonial period the Unión Obrera Democrática Filipina (Filipino Democratic Labor Union) held a rally in front of the Malacañang Palace demanding workers' economic rights and Philippine independence. In 1908, the Philippine Assembly passed a bill officially recognizing 1 May as a national holiday; the first official commemoration taking place in 1913, when 36 labour unions convened for a congress in Manila.

During the Presidency of Gloria Macapagal-Arroyo, a policy was adopted called holiday economics policy that moved holidays to either a Monday or a Friday to create a long weekend of three days. In 2002, Labor Day was moved to the Monday nearest to 1 May. Labour groups protested, as they accused the Arroyo administration of belittling the holiday. By 2008, Labor Day was excluded in the holiday economics policy, returning the commemorations to 1 May, no matter what day of the week it falls on.

==== Singapore ====
In Singapore, it is known as Labour Day and is a public holiday. The Prime Minister, who is the leader of the ruling People's Action Party, gives a Labour Day Rally championing the tripartite relationship between government, employers, and employees.

==== Thailand ====
In Thailand, the day is known in English as National Labour Day, and is one of 17 official public holidays in Thailand.

==== Vietnam ====
In Vietnam, it is known as International Labour Day (Vietnamese: Ngày Quốc tế Lao động) and is a public holiday. It was first adopted by the Nguyễn dynasty on the 11th day of the 9th month of the 16th year of the Bảo Đại Emperor (30 October 1941) by imperial decree. Later on 29 April 1946 President Hồ Chí Minh issued Sắc lệnh số 56 (Decree No. 56) which adopted the holiday for the Democratic Republic of Vietnam.

According to the decree "workers in public offices, private offices and factories throughout the country are entitled to a day off from work. International Labour 1.5 and still receive the same salary as a working day...". On 1 May 1946 the first International Labour Day of the Democratic Republic of Vietnam was held.

=== West Asia ===
==== Bahrain ====
In Bahrain, 1 May is known as Labour Day and is a public holiday.

==== Iran ====
In Iran, 1 May is known as the International Workers' Day. It is not a public holiday but according to article 63 of Iranian labour law on top of the official public holidays observed in the Islamic Republic of Iran, Labour Day shall be considered an official holiday for workers.

==== Iraq ====
In Iraq, it is known as the International Workers' Day and is a public holiday.

==== Israel ====
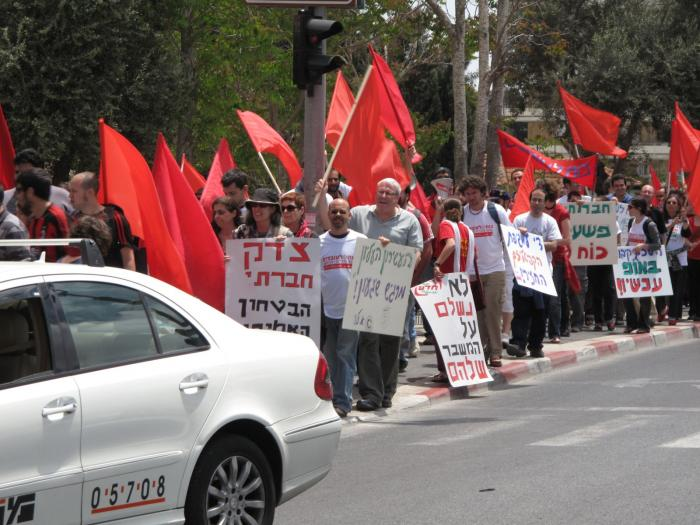
Labour Day march in Israel, 1 May 2007

After historically varying popularity of Labour Day, 1 May is not an official holiday in the State of Israel. In the 1980s there were several large marches in Tel Aviv, numbering as much as 350,000 in 1983 and perhaps even more in 1988, but a steady decline in numbers led to only 5,000 marchers in 2010. During the 1990s businesses began to treat it like a regular working day as the number of Labour Day-related activities decreased.

==== Jordan ====
1 May is known as Labour Day and is a public holiday.

==== Lebanon ====
1 May known as the Workers' Day and is a public holiday. Left-wing parties and workers' unions organize marches on 1 May.

==== Palestine ====
1 May is known as Labour Day and is a public holiday.

==== Yemen ====
1 May is known as Labour Day and is a public holiday.

== Official observation by country and territory ==
Country/Territory	International Workers' Day / Labour Day public holiday on 1 May
Afghanistan	No (no holiday)
Albania	Yes
Algeria	Yes
Andorra	Yes
Angola	Yes
Antigua and Barbuda	first Monday in May
Argentina	Yes
Armenia	Yes
Australia	No (date varies by state/territory)
Austria	Yes
Azerbaijan	No (no holiday)
Bahamas	Yes
Bahrain	Yes
Bangladesh	Yes
Barbados	Yes
Belarus	Yes
Belgium	Yes
Belize	Yes
Benin	Yes
Bhutan	Yes
Bolivia	Yes
Bosnia and Herzegovina	Yes
Botswana	Yes
Brazil	Yes
Brunei	Yes
Bulgaria	Yes
Burkina Faso	Yes
Burundi	Yes
Cambodia	Yes
Cameroon	Yes
Canada	No (first Monday in September)
Cape Verde	Yes
Central African Republic	Yes
Chad	Yes
Chile	Yes
China	Yes
Colombia	Yes
Comoros	Yes
Republic of the Congo	Yes
Democratic Republic of the Congo	Yes
Costa Rica	Yes
Croatia	Yes
Cuba	Yes
Cyprus	Yes
Czech Republic	Yes
Denmark	No (no holiday)
Djibouti	Yes
Dominica	first Monday in May
Dominican Republic	Yes
East Timor	Yes
Ecuador	Yes
Egypt	Yes
El Salvador	Yes
Equatorial Guinea	Yes
Eritrea	Yes
Estonia	Spring Day (Kevadpüha) public holiday on 1 May
Eswatini	Yes
Ethiopia	Yes
Fiji	No (no holiday)
Finland	May Day (Vappu) public holiday on 1 May
France	Yes
Gabon	Yes
Gambia	Yes
Georgia	Yes
Germany	Yes
Ghana	Yes
Greece	Yes
Grenada	Yes
Guatemala	Yes
Guinea	Yes
Guinea-Bissau	Yes
Guyana	Yes
Haiti	Yes
Honduras	Yes
Hungary	Yes
Iceland	Yes
India	Yes
Indonesia	Yes
Iran	Yes
Iraq	Yes
Ireland	first Monday in May
Israel	No (no holiday)
Italy	Yes
Ivory Coast	Yes
Jamaica	No (23 May)
Japan	No (23 November)
Jordan	Yes
Kazakhstan	No (Kazakhstan People's Unity Day celebrated instead; Labour Day falls on last Sunday in September)
Kenya	Yes
Kiribati	Yes
Kuwait	Yes
Kyrgyzstan	Yes
Laos	Yes
Latvia	Yes
Lebanon	Yes
Lesotho	Yes
Liberia	No (no holiday)
Libya	Yes
Liechtenstein	Yes
Lithuania	Yes
Luxembourg	Yes
Madagascar	Yes
Malawi	Yes
Malaysia	Yes
Maldives	Yes
Mali	Yes
Malta	Yes
Marshall Islands	Yes
Mauritania	Yes
Mauritius	Yes
Mexico	Yes
Micronesia	Yes
Moldova	Yes
Monaco	Yes
Mongolia	No (no holiday)
Montenegro	Yes
Morocco	Yes
Mozambique	Yes
Myanmar	Yes
Namibia	Yes
Nauru	Yes
Nepal	Yes
Netherlands	No (no holiday)
New Zealand	No (fourth Monday in October)
Nicaragua	Yes
Niger	Yes
Nigeria	Yes
North Korea	Yes
North Macedonia	Yes
Norway	Yes
Oman	No (no holiday)
Pakistan	Yes
Palau	Yes
Palestine	Yes
Panama	Yes
Papua New Guinea	No (no holiday)
Paraguay	Yes
Peru	Yes
Philippines	Yes
Poland	Yes
Portugal	Yes
Qatar	No (no holiday)
Romania	Yes
Russia	Yes
Rwanda	Yes
Saint Kitts and Nevis	first Monday in May
Saint Lucia	Yes
Saint Vincent and the Grenadines	Yes
Samoa	No (no holiday)
San Marino	Yes
São Tomé and Príncipe	Yes
Saudi Arabia	No (no holiday)
Senegal	Yes
Serbia	Yes
Seychelles	Yes
Sierra Leone	No (no holiday)
Singapore	Yes
Slovakia	Yes
Slovenia	Yes
Solomon Islands	No (no holiday)
Somalia	Yes
South Africa	Yes
South Korea	Yes
South Sudan	Yes
Spain	Yes
Sri Lanka	Yes
Sudan	No (no holiday)
Suriname	Yes
Sweden	Yes
Switzerland	Yes
Syria	Yes
Taiwan	Yes
Tajikistan	Yes
Tanzania	Yes
Thailand	Yes
Togo	Yes
Tonga	No (no holiday)
Trinidad and Tobago	No (19 June)
Tunisia	Yes
Turkey	Yes
Turkmenistan	No (no holiday)
Tuvalu	Yes
Uganda	Yes
Ukraine	Yes
United Arab Emirates	No (no holiday)
United Kingdom	Early May bank holiday on first Monday in May
United States	No (first Monday in September)
Uruguay	Yes
Uzbekistan	No (no holiday)
Vanuatu	Yes
Vatican City	Yes
Venezuela	Yes
Vietnam	Yes
Yemen	Yes
Zambia	Yes
Zimbabwe	Yes

== See also ==
- Workers' Memorial Day
- National Day of Mourning (Canadian observance)
- May Day
- Pervomaysky (disambiguation)
