= Tokyo Stock Exchange =

Stock exchange in Tokyo, Japan

- 東京証券取引所
- The TSE uses the logo of its parent company, the Japan Exchange Group.

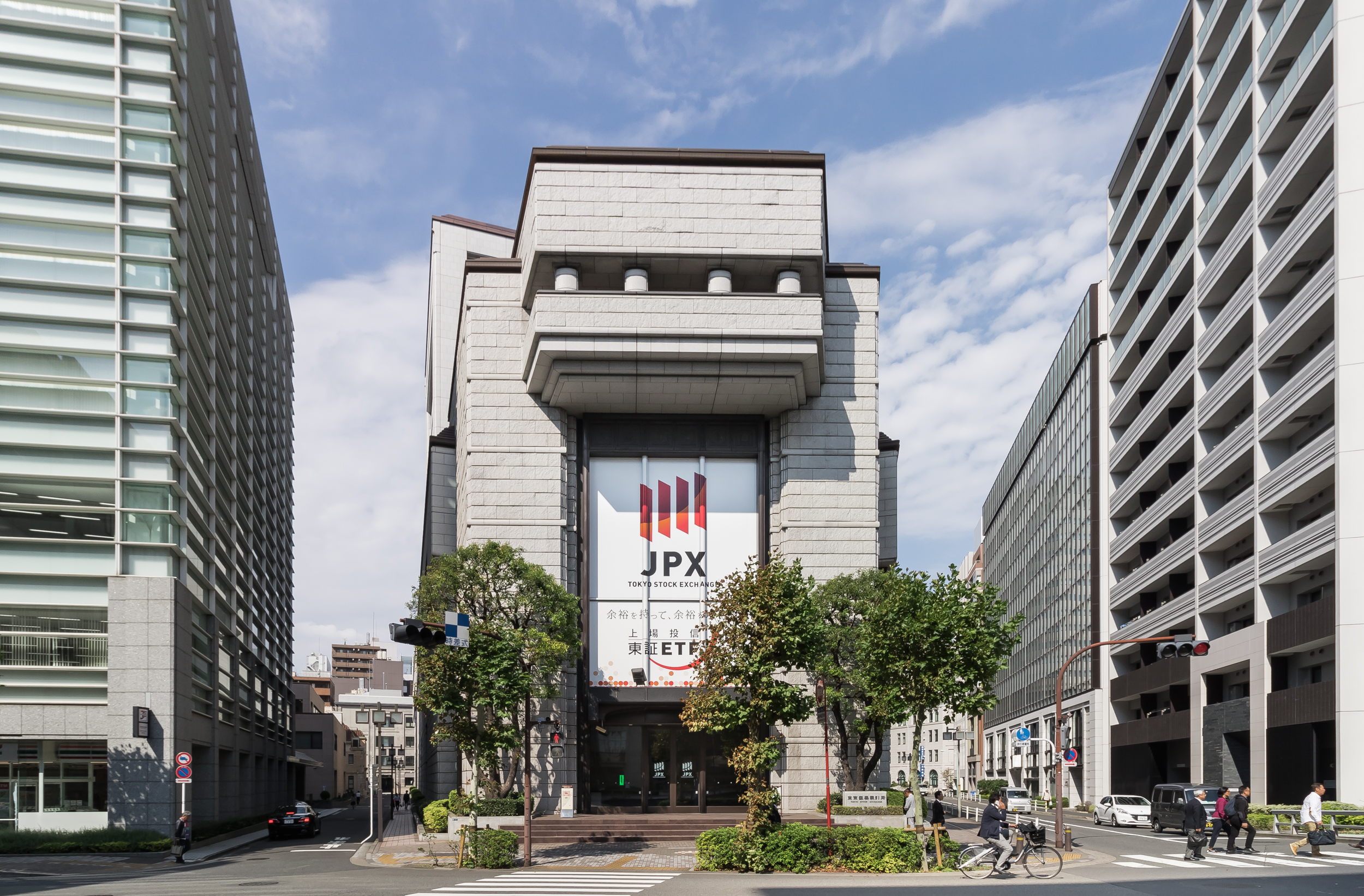
- Façade of the Tokyo Stock Exchange Building
- Type: Stock exchange
- Location: Tokyo, Japan
- Coordinates: 35°40′53″N 139°46′40″E
- Founded: May 15, 1878; 148 years ago (as Tokyo Kabushiki Torihikijo); May 16, 1949; 77 years ago (as Tokyo Stock Exchange)
- Owner: Japan Exchange Group
- Key people: Taizo Nishimuro (Chairman); Atsushi Saito (President & CEO); Yasuo Tobiyama (MD, COO & CFO)
- Currency: Japanese yen
- No. of listings: 3,935 (February 2026)
- Market cap: ¥1,372.38 trillion ($7.8 trillion) (February 2026)
- Indices: Nikkei 225; TOPIX
- Website: jpx.co.jp

The Tokyo Stock Exchange (東京証券取引所, Tōkyō Shōken Torihikijo), abbreviated as Tosho (東証) or TSE/TYO, is a stock exchange located in Tokyo, Japan.

The exchange is owned by Japan Exchange Group (JPX), a holding company that it also lists (TYO: 8697), and operated by Tokyo Stock Exchange, Inc., a wholly owned subsidiary of JPX. JPX was formed from the merger of Tokyo Stock Exchange Group, Inc. with Osaka Securities Exchange Co., Ltd. (now Osaka Exchange, Inc.); the merger process began in July 2012, when said merger was approved by the Japan Fair Trade Commission. JPX itself was launched on January 1, 2013.

== Overview ==
The TSE is incorporated as a kabushiki gaisha (joint-stock company) with nine directors, four auditors and eight executive officers. Its headquarters are located at 2-1 Nihonbashi-Kabutochō, Chūō, Tokyo which is the largest financial district in Japan.

The main indices tracking the stock market of TSE are the Nikkei 225 index of companies selected by the Nihon Keizai Shimbun (Japan's largest business newspaper), the TOPIX index based on the share prices of Prime companies, and the J30 index of large industrial companies maintained by Japan's major broadsheet newspapers. There are also active bond market and futures market.

Ninety-four domestic and 10 foreign securities companies participate in TSE trading. See: Members of the Tokyo Stock Exchange

=== Press club ===
The exchange's press club, called the Kabuto Club (兜倶楽部, Kabuto kurabu), meets on the third floor of the TSE building. Most Kabuto Club members are affiliated with the Nihon Keizai Shimbun, Kyodo News, Jiji Press, or business television broadcasters such as Bloomberg LP and CNBC. The Kabuto Club is generally busiest during April and May, when public companies release their annual accounts.

=== Hours ===
The exchange's normal trading sessions are from 9:00 a.m. to 11:30 a.m. and from 12:30 p.m. to 3:30 p.m. on all days of the week except Saturdays, Sundays and holidays declared by the Exchange in advance. The exchange is closed for the following holidays: New Year's Day, Coming of Age Day, National Foundation Day, Vernal Equinox Day, Shōwa Day, Constitution Memorial Day, Greenery Day, Children's Day, Marine Day, Respect for the Aged Day, Autumnal Equinox, Health and Sports Day, Culture Day, Labour Thanksgiving Day, and The Emperor's Birthday.

== Stock market ==
=== First, Second and other Sections until April 4, 2022 ===
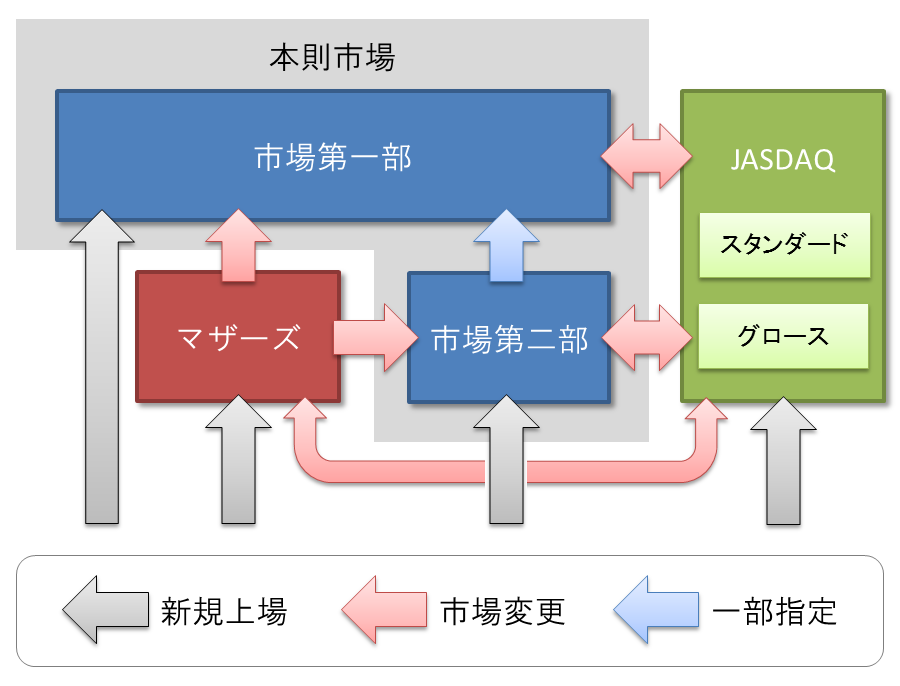
Old market segments until April 2022 (in Japanese)

Until April 4, 2022, corporate shares are listed and traded at Tokyo Stock Exchange in five market sections: the First Section which started when Tokyo Stock Exchange was re-established in 1949 and includes mainly large companies; the Second Section which started in 1961 and includes mainly mid-sized companies; JASDAQ (established in 1991, acquired by Osaka Stock Exchange in 2010, and absorbed into TSE in 2013) and Mothers (Market of the high-growth and emerging stocks, established at TSE in 1999) which are both for emerging companies; and TOKYO PRO Market which was established in 2009 jointly with London Stock Exchange as an Alternative Investment Market (Tokyo AIM) for small companies.

There were a total of 3,821 companies listed in Tokyo Stock Exchange, as of March 31, 2022.

Listed in TSE (as of March 31, 2022)
Business size	Market names		Total	(Overseas companies)
Large	Main Market (本則市場)	First Section (市場第一部)	2,176	(1)
Mid-sized	Main Market (本則市場)	Second Section (市場第二部)	475	(1)
Emerging	Mothers (マザーズ)		432	(3)
Emerging	JASDAQ	Standard (スタンダード)	652	(1)
Emerging	JASDAQ	Growth (グロース)	34	(0)
Small	TOKYO PRO Market		52	(0)
Total			3,821	(6)

=== Prime, Standard and Growth markets since April 4, 2022 ===
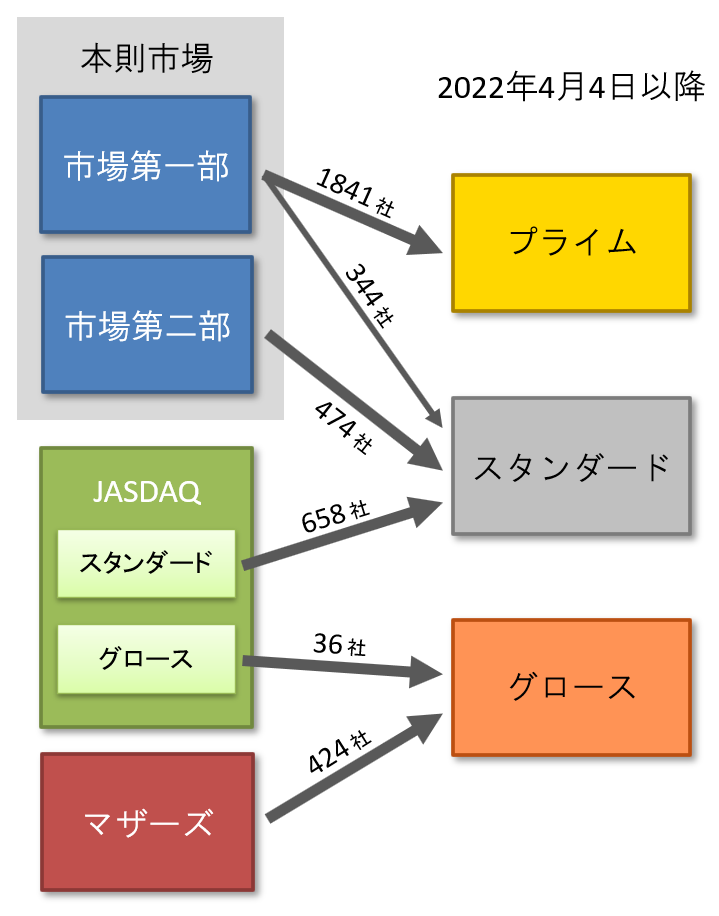
Number of companies transitioning into the new market division structure on April 4, 2022 (in Japanese)

Beginning April 4, 2022, the market divisions were restructured into the Prime, Standard and Growth market divisions, differentiated by market liquidity, corporate governance, and other criteria. Companies voluntarily selected their new division between September and December 2021, and the results were published on January 11, 2022. From the First Section, 1841 companies were transitioned into the Prime market and 344 companies were transitioned into the Standard market. All 474 companies in the Second Section were also transitioned into the Standard market. From JASDAQ, all 658 companies in its Standard subsection were transitioned into the Standard market and all 36 companies in the Growth subsection were transitioned into the Growth market, along with all 424 companies in the Mothers section.

There were a total of 3,899 companies listed in Tokyo Stock Exchange, as of 21 August 2023.

Listed in TSE (as of 21 August 2023)
Business size	Market names	Total	(Overseas companies)
Large	Prime Market (プライム市場)	1,834	(1)
Mid-sized	Standard Market (スタンダード市場)	1,440	(2)
Emerging	Growth Market (グロース市場)	546	(3)
Small	TOKYO PRO Market	79	(0)
Total		3,899	(6)

== History ==
=== Prewar ===
The Tokyo Stock Exchange was established on May 15, 1878, as the Tokyo Kabushiki Torihikijo (東京株式取引所; also literally means the Tokyo Stock Exchange and shortened as Tōkabu (東株)) under the direction of then-Finance Minister Ōkuma Shigenobu and capitalist advocate Shibusawa Eiichi. Trading began on June 1, 1878.

In 1943, the exchange was combined with eleven other stock exchanges in major Japanese cities to form a single Japanese Stock Exchange (日本証券取引所, Nippon Shōken Torihikisho). The combined exchange was shut down on August 1, days before the bombing of Hiroshima.

=== Postwar ===
Logo used prior to JPX merger

The Tokyo Stock Exchange reopened under its current Japanese name on May 16, 1949, pursuant to the new Securities Exchange Act.

The TSE runup from 1983 to 1990 was unprecedented, in 1990 it accounted for over 60% of the world's stock market capitalization (by far the world's largest) before falling precipitously in value and rank one of the 4th largest exchange in the world by market capitalization of listed shares.

The current TSE building was opened on May 23, 1988, replacing the original TSE building from 1931, and the trading floor of the TSE was closed on April 30, 1999, so that the exchange could switch to electronic trading for all transactions. A new facility, called TSE Arrows (東証アローズ, Tōshō Arrows), opened on May 9, 2000. In 2010, the TSE launched its Arrowhead trading facility.

In 2001, the TSE restructured itself as a kabushiki gaisha ("stock company"): before this time, it was structured as an incorporated association (社団法人, shadan hōjin) with its members as shareholders.

On 15 June 2007, the TSE paid $303 million to acquire a 4.99% stake in Singapore Exchange Ltd.

The London Stock Exchange (LSE) and the TSE are developing jointly traded products and share technology, marking the latest cross-border deal among bourses as international competition heats up.

In July 2008, the LSE and the TSE announced a new joint venture Tokyo-based market, which will be based on the LSE's Alternative Investment Market (AIM).

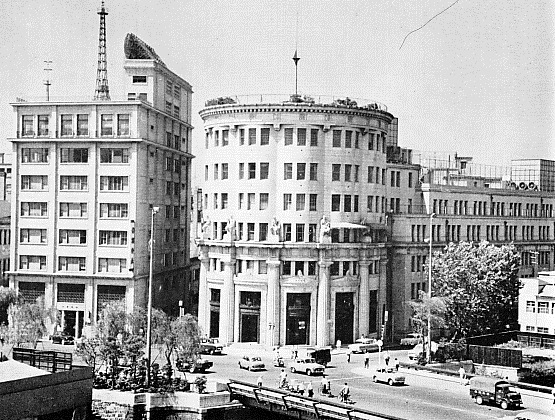
Old Tokyo Stock Exchange building (c. 1960)

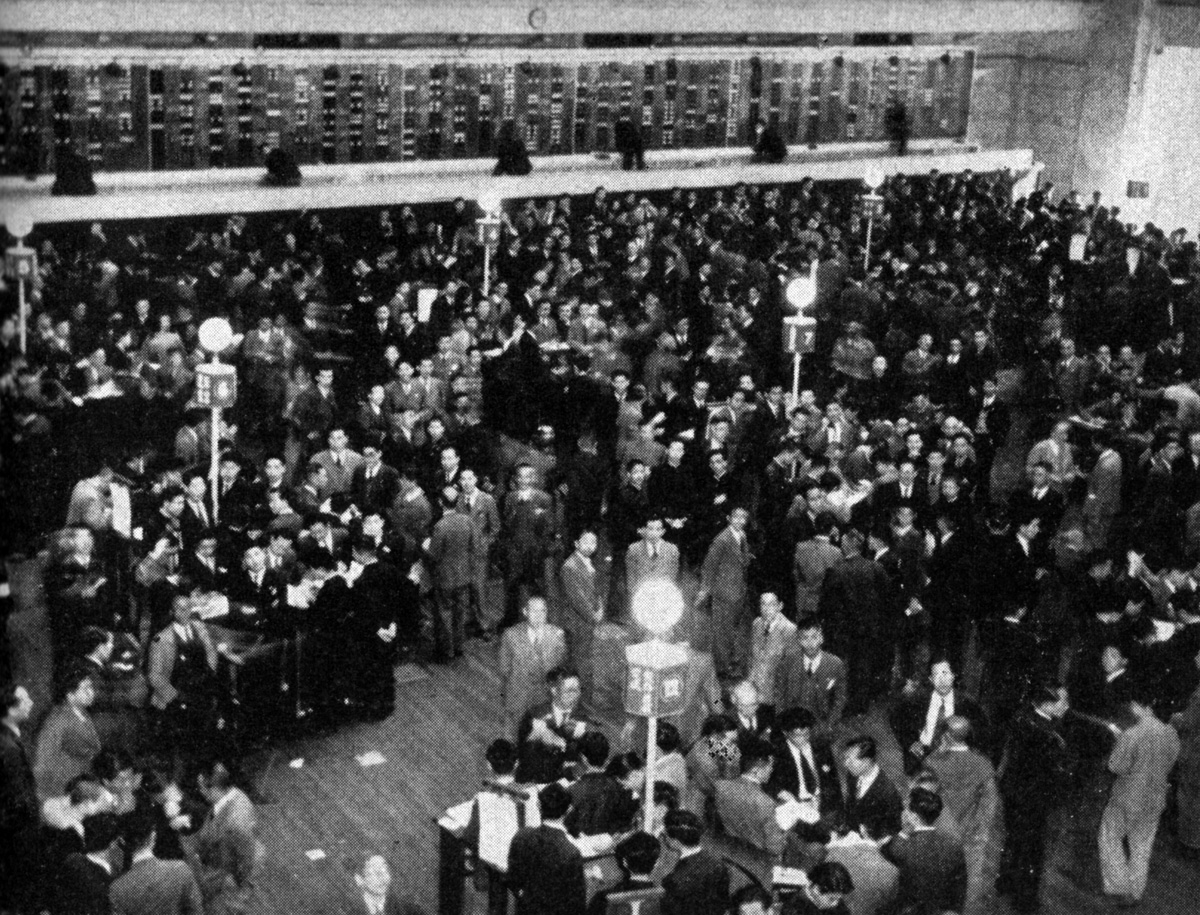
Tokyo Stock Exchange (1950)

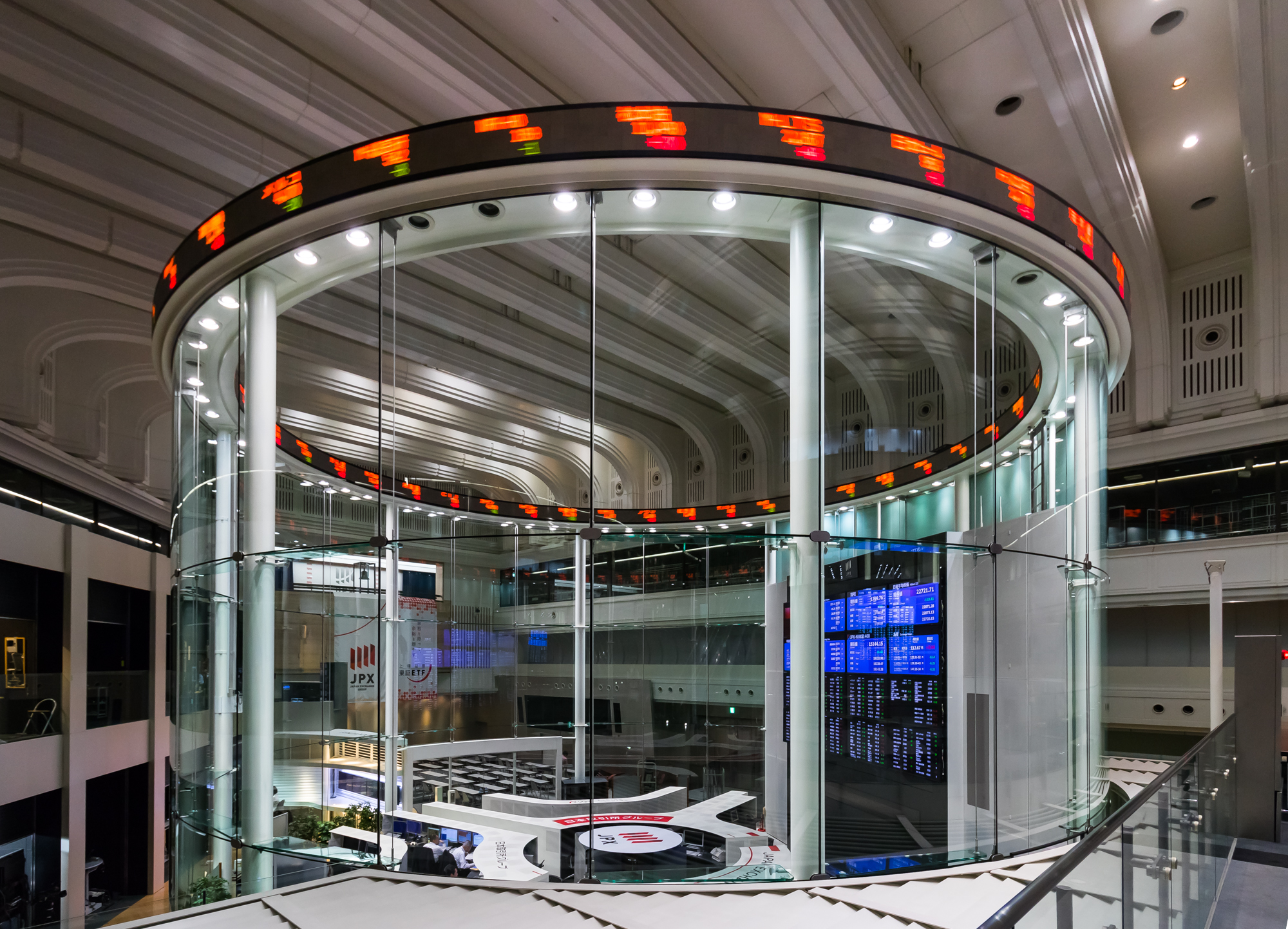
The annular electric bulletin board on the market center (2018)

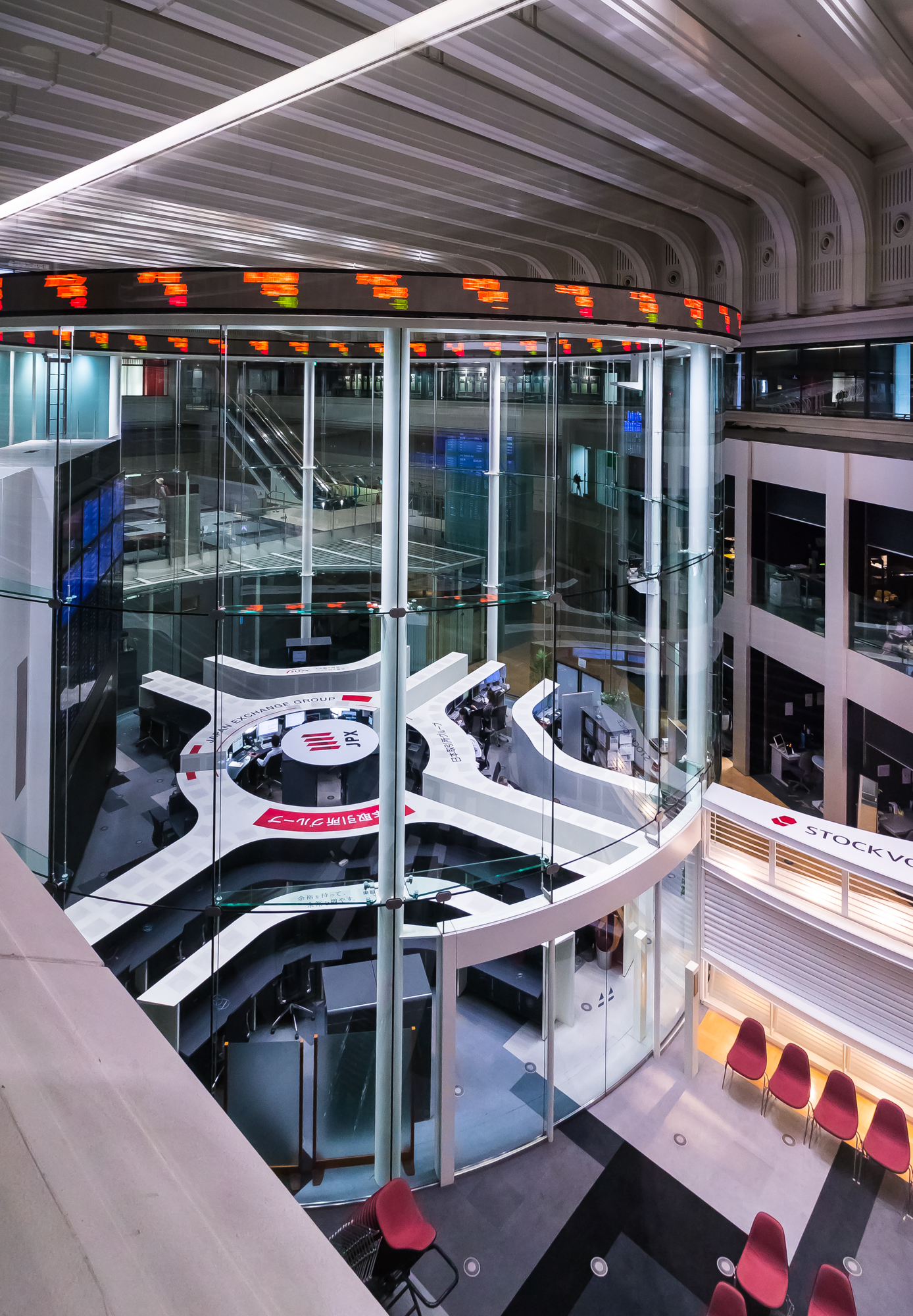
Main room of the Tokyo Stock Exchange (2018)

=== Technology problems ===
The exchange was only able to operate for 90 minutes on November 1, 2005, due to bugs with a newly installed transactions system, developed by Fujitsu, which was supposed to help cope with higher trading volumes. The interruption in trading was the worst in the history of the exchange until October 1, 2020. Trading was suspended for four-and-a-half hours.

During the initial public offering of advertising giant Dentsu, in December 2001, a trader at UBS Warburg, the Swiss investment bank, sold 610,000 shares in this company at ¥6 each, while he intended to sell 16 shares at ¥600,000. The bank lost £71 million.

During yet another initial public offering, that of J-Com, on December 8, 2005, an employee at Mizuho Securities Co., Ltd. mistakenly typed an order to sell 600,000 shares at ¥1 each, instead of an order to sell 1 share at ¥600,000. Mizuho failed to catch the error; the Tokyo Stock Exchange initially blocked attempts to cancel the order, resulting in a net loss of US$347 million to be shared between the exchange and Mizuho. Both companies are now trying to deal with their troubles: lack of error checking, lack of safeguards, lack of reliability, lack of transparency, lack of testing, loss of confidence, and loss of profits. On 11 December, the TSE acknowledged that its system was at fault in the Mizuho trade. On 21 December, Takuo Tsurushima, chief executive of the TSE, and two other senior executives resigned over the Mizuho affair.

On January 17, 2006, the Nikkei 225 fell 2.8%, its fastest drop in nine months, as investors sold stocks across the board in the wake of a raid by prosecutors on internet company livedoor. The Tokyo Stock Exchange suspended trading 20 minutes before the close on January 18 due to the trade volume threatening to exceed the exchange's computer system's capacity of 4.5 million trades per day. This was called the "livedoor shock". The exchange quickly increased its order capacity to five million trades a day.

On October 9, 2018, one of the four gateways used for order entry was taken down after Merrill Lynch Japan Securities erroneously tried to establish a second connection after it had already connected. Even though brokerages have access to alternative gateways, the outage caused "delays in execution, correction and cancellation" for many securities firms including Daiwa Securities and Nomura.

On October 1, 2020, for the first time in its history as an all electronic exchange, the Tokyo Stock Exchange had to suspend trading in all shares for a whole day due to a technical glitch, causing buying and selling to freeze. This was announced just minutes before 9 a.m., when it was scheduled to open. The problem was found to be in "the system for relaying market information", hence making the glitch a network problem, but the Asahi Shimbun reported that the glitch was due to a mechanical failure. The issue stemmed back to the "Arrowhead" trading system and the inability to fail over to backup hardware. Other stock markets in Japan, including regional exchanges in Nagoya, Fukuoka and Sapporo, also suspended trading because they used the same technology platform as the TSE. Meanwhile, derivatives on the OSE continued trading, with Nikkei futures ending the day 0.56% higher. Japan Exchange Group Inc., which operates the Tokyo Stock Exchange, said that the suspension would be indefinite until the problem was resolved. Normal trading was resumed the following day.

== See also ==
- List of East Asian stock exchanges
- List of stock exchanges
