= Happy Monday System =

Japanese law on public holidays

The Happy Monday System (ハッピーマンデー制度, Happī Mandē Seido) is a set of modifications to Japanese law in 1998 and 2001 to move a number of public holidays in Japan to Mondays, creating three-day weekends for those with five-day work weeks. It is the Japanese equivalent of the 1968 Uniform Monday Holiday Act in the United States.

Public holidays in Japan
Date	Moved to Monday	English name	Local name	Romanization
January 1	No	New Year's Day	元日	Ganjitsu
January 15	Since 2000	Coming of Age Day	成人の日	Seijin no hi
February 11	No	National Foundation Day	建国記念の日	Kenkoku kinen no hi
February 23	No	Emperor's Birthday	天皇誕生日	Tennō tanjōbi
March 20 or March 21	No	Vernal Equinox Day	春分の日	Shunbun no hi
April 29	No	Showa Day (Hirohito's Birthday)	昭和の日	Shōwa no hi
May 3	No	Constitution Memorial Day	憲法記念日	Kenpō kinenbi
May 4	No	Greenery Day	みどりの日	Midori no hi
May 5	No	Children's Day	こどもの日	Kodomo no hi
July 20	Since 2003	Marine Day	海の日	Umi no hi
August 11	No	Mountain Day	山の日	Yama no hi
September 15	Since 2003	Respect for the Aged Day	敬老の日	Keirō no hi
September 22 or September 23	No	Autumnal Equinox Day	秋分の日	Shūbun no hi
October 10	Since 2000	Sports Day	スポーツの日	Supōtsu no hi
November 3	No	Culture Day	文化の日	Bunka no hi
November 23	No	Labor Thanksgiving Day	勤労感謝の日	Kinrō kansha no hi

== See also ==
- Japanese calendar
- Japanese festivals
- Holiday economics – similar policy in the Philippines
- Uniform Monday Holiday Act – similar legislation in the United States
