= Silver Week =

String of consecutive holidays in Japan

Silver Week シルバーウィーク (Shirubā Wīku)
- Genre: String of consecutive holidays
- Date: September
- Country: Japan

Silver Week (シルバーウィーク, Shirubā Wīku) is a new Japanese term applied to a string of consecutive holidays in September, occurring only in certain years.

== Overview ==
The slogan was coined by Hideo Matsuyama, a Daiei Film executive and the later president of Dainichi Eihai. Matsuyama was also one of two alleged inventors of "Golden Week", along with the Daiei president Masaichi Nagata.

In 2009, the term gained popularity, referring to the unusual occurrence that year of a weekend followed by three Japanese public holidays in September. The holidays were:

- Respect for the Aged Day, third Monday of September
- Autumnal Equinox Day, astronomically determined, but usually September 23
- Kokumin no kyūjitsu, the day in between the two other holidays

Japanese law stipulates that if there is only one non-holiday in between two public holidays, that day should become an additional holiday, known as a Kokumin no kyūjitsu (lit. Citizens' Holiday). It is unusual for September to get this extra holiday, so the presence of a "silver week" was not widely noted before 2009. The term "silver week" suggests a secondary status after the more famous (and annual) "Golden Week", and might also evoke the fact that it includes a holiday celebrating senior citizens. The holiday period is sometimes used for foreign travel.

Prior to 2009, a different definition of Silver Week referred to the days in the second half of November around the time of Labour Thanksgiving Day, or during the first week of November by another source. Historians have identified Silver Week itself as a commercial invention of the 1950s film industry, keen to promote cinema attendance during the holiday by reference to the popularity of leisure pursuits during the better-established Golden Week, yet another invention of the Japanese film industry. However, this older definition of Silver Week did not catch on nor did it make it to some dictionaries.

== September occurrences ==
The three-day break occurs in the following years:

- September 19–23: 2009, 2015, 2026, 2037, 2043, 2054, 2071, 2099
- September 18–22: 2032, 2049, 2060, 2077, 2088, 2094

== See also ==
- Public holidays in Japan
