= National Foundation Day (Japan) =

National holiday in Japan (11 February)

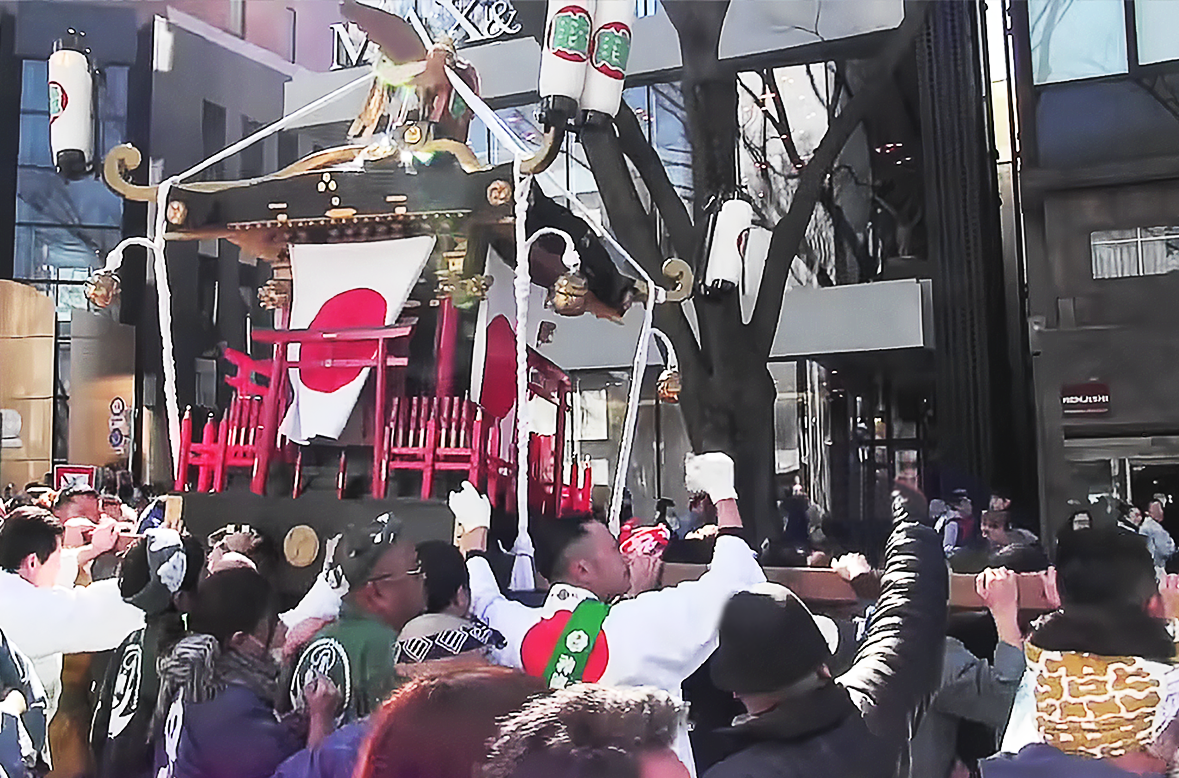
- A mikoshi carried during a parade
- Official name: Kenkoku Kinen no Hi (建国記念の日)
- Observed by: Japan
- Type: Public
- Significance: Celebrates the founding of the nation
- Celebrations: Family reunions, parades, concerts
- Date: 11 February
- Frequency: Annual

National Foundation Day (建国記念の日, Kenkoku Kinen no Hi) is a public holiday of Japan observed annually on the 11th of February. The holiday has been celebrated since 1967, following the proclamation of it as a public holiday by a Cabinet Order the previous year. 11 February is the accession date of the legendary first Emperor of Japan, Emperor Jimmu at Kashihara-gū, converted into Gregorian calendar of 660 BC which is written in Kojiki and chapter 3 of Nihon Shoki. February 11 was the date of the 1889 promulgation of the Meiji Constitution which was selected to create a cultural link to the founding of the empire, reinforcing the status of the imperial line.

== History ==
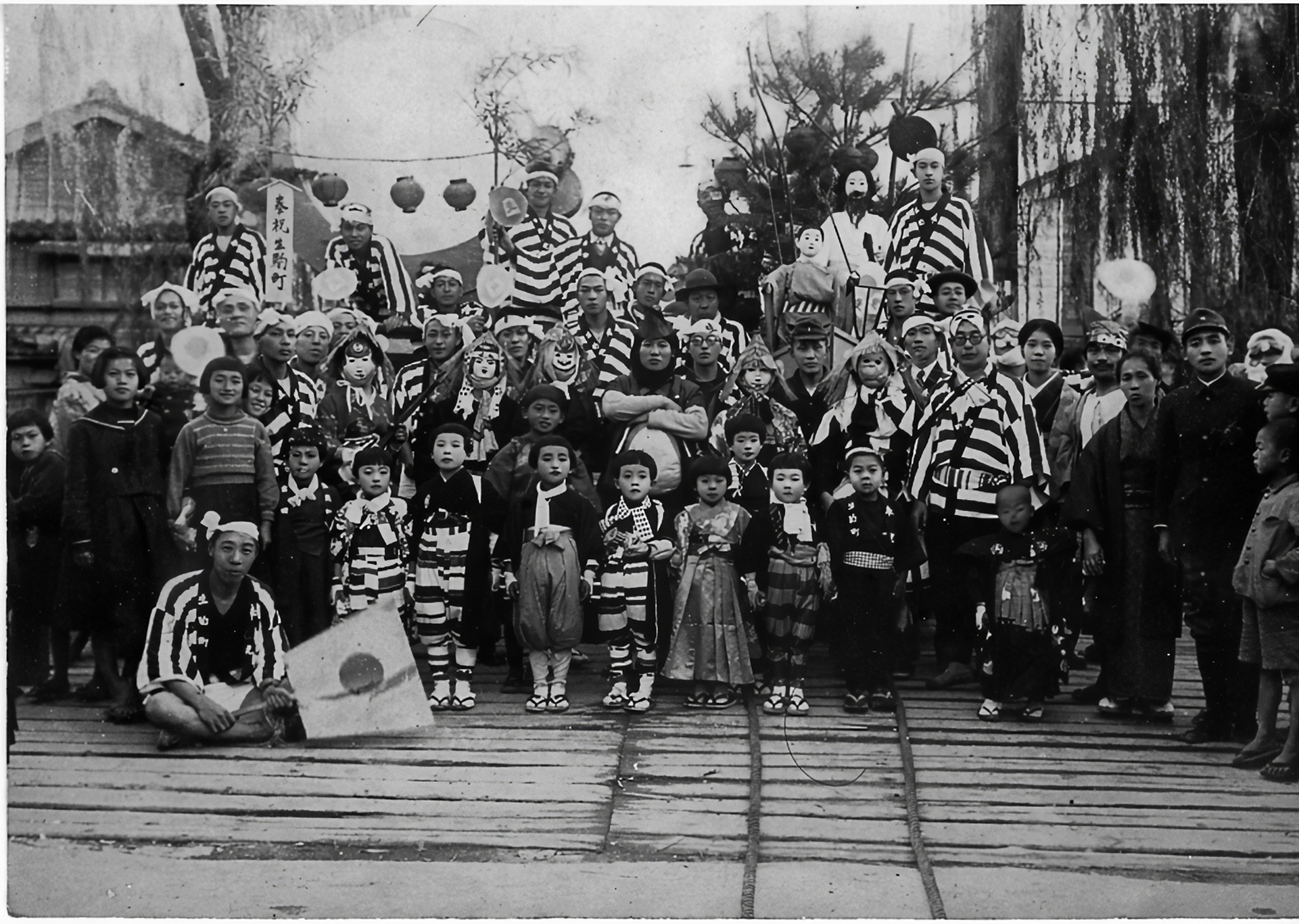
Kigensetsu celebration, pre-1940.

=== Kigensetsu ===
The origin of National Foundation Day is New Year's Day in the traditional lunisolar calendar. On that day, the foundation of Japan by the legendary Emperor Jimmu was celebrated based on the Nihon Shoki, which states that Emperor Jimmu ascended to the throne on the first day of the first month. There is, however, no compelling historical evidence that the legendary Emperor Jimmu actually existed. Emperor Kinmei (539–571) is the earliest generally agreed upon historical ruler of Japan. During the Kofun period (300–538), Yamato was the first central government of the unified state in the Kinai region of central Japan. The first historical records did not appear until the 8th century, with the Kojiki and Nihon Shoki. The year of 660 BC was deliberately chosen because it was meant to align with the beginning of a 1,260-year cicle, or 21 sexagenary cycles.

In the Meiji era, the government of Meiji Japan designated the day as a national holiday as part of the modernization of Japan under the Meiji Restoration. Under the bakufu, people in Japan worshiped the emperors as living gods, but regional loyalties were just as strong as national loyalties, with most people feeling an equal or a stronger loyalty to the daimyō ("lord") ruling their province as they did to the shōgun who ruled from distant Edo, let alone the emperor who reigned in the equally distant city of Kyoto. Moreover, Shintoism has a number of deities, and until the Meiji Restoration, the emperors were just one of many Shinto gods, and usually not the most important. During the Meiji era, the government went out of its way to promote the imperial cult of emperor-worship as a way of ensuring that loyalty to the national government in Tokyo would outweigh regional loyalties. Moreover, the process of modernization in Meiji era Japan was intended to ensure that Japan adopted Western technology, science and models of social organization, but not the values of the West; it was a fear of the government that the Japanese people might embrace Western values like democracy and individualism. This led the government to insist that all Japanese should hold the same values, with any heterodoxy viewed as a threat to the kokutai. The American historian Carol Gluck noted that for the Japanese state in the Meiji era, "social conformity" was the highest value, with dissent considered a major threat to the kokutai.

Up to 1871, Japanese society was divided into four castes: the samurai, the merchants, the artisans and the peasants. The samurai were the dominant caste, but the aggressive militarism of the samurai was not embraced by the other castes, who could not legally own weapons. One of the Meiji era reforms was the introduction of conscription of all able-bodied men at age 18, to serve in either the Army or the Navy. This required the ideology of Bushido ("the way of the warrior") from people who historically had been encouraged to see war as the exclusive concern of the samurai. The imperial cult of emperor-worship was promoted both to ensure that everyone would be a part of the kokutai and to ensure that all men embraced Bushido, and would willingly serve in the military. After conscription was introduced in 1873, a group of teenage rickshaw drivers and shop clerks were ordered to attend a lecture where they were informed that "Now that all men are samurai," they were to show "manly obedience" by enlisting in the Army at once, and many objected on the grounds that they did not come from samurai families.

The new holiday was introduced to help promote the imperial cult underpinning the kokutai. This coincided with the switch from the lunisolar calendar to the Gregorian calendar in 1873. The holiday was proclaimed on the Lunar New Year of 1872, on the accession of Emperor Jimmu according to the Nihon Shoki. The date was 29 January 1873 of the Gregorian calendar, but later that year it was changed to 11 February, probably to avoid conflict with the celebrations of Lunar New Year. 11 February was also the day when the Constitution of the Empire of Japan was proclaimed in 1889.

In its original form, the holiday was named Kigensetsu (紀元節), translated by one pre-war scholar as "Festival of the Accession of the First Emperor and the Foundation of the Empire". The national holiday was supported by those who believed that focusing national attention on the emperor would serve an unifying purpose, holding the kokutai together with all Japanese people united by their love of the god-emperor. Publicly linking his rule with the legendary first emperor, Jimmu, and thus the Sun Goddess Amaterasu, Emperor Meiji declared himself the one, true ruler of Japan. The claim that the emperors of Japan were gods was based upon their supposed descent from Amaterasu, the most important of the Shinto gods and goddesses. With large parades and festivals, in its time, Kigensetsu was considered one of the four major holidays of Japan.

The holiday of Kigensetsu featured parades, athletic competitions, the public reading of poems, the handing out of sweets and buns to children, with the highlight of the Kigensetsu always being a rally where ordinary people would kowtow to a portrait of the emperor, which was followed up by the singing of the national anthem and patriotic speeches whose principal theme was always that Japan was a uniquely virtuous nation because of its rule by the god-emperors. Kigensetsu provided the model for school ceremonies, albeit on a smaller scale, as classes always began in Japan with the students bowing to a portrait of the emperor, and school graduations and the opening of new schools were conducted in a manner very similar to how Kigensetsu was celebrated. When students graduated in Japan, the principal and the teachers would always give speeches to the graduating class on the theme that Japan was a special nation because its emperors were gods, and it was the duty of every student to serve the god-emperor.

Reflecting the fact that for most Japanese people under the bakufu regional loyalties were stronger than national loyalties, in the 1880s and 1890s, there was some confusion in the rural areas of Japan about just what precisely Kigensetsu was meant to celebrate, with one deputy mayor of a small village in 1897 believing that Kigensetsu was Emperor Meiji's birthday. It was not until about 1900 that everyone in the rural areas of Japan finally understood the meaning of Kigensetsu. Aizawa, the same deputy mayor who in 1897 who thought the holiday was Emperor Meiji's birthday, later become the mayor, in 1903 gave his first Kigensetsu speech at the local school, and in 1905 he organized a free banquet to go along with Kigensetsu, which become an annual tradition in his village.

The slow penetration of Kigensetsu in the rural areas was due to the fact that the children of most peasants did not attend school or at least for very long, and it was only with the gradual establishment of a universal education system that the imperial cult caught on. Between the 1870s to the 1890s, all of the rural areas of Japan finally acquired a school, which allowed everyone to be educated. It was only about 1910 that Kigensetsu finally started to serve its purpose as a holiday that united the entire Japanese nation in loyalty to the emperor over the length and breadth of Japan. However, the government in Tokyo was as late as 1911 still chiding local officials in rural areas for including in Kigensetsu ceremonies to honor local Shinto gods, reminding them the purpose of Kigensetsu was to unite the Japanese nation in loyalty to the god-emperor in Tokyo, not honor local gods.

=== Postwar transition ===
Given its reliance on the State Shinto, the nationalistic version of Shinto which is the traditional Japanese ethnic religion and its reinforcement of the Japanese nobility based on the Japanese nationalism and militarism, Kigensetsu was abolished following the surrender of Japan following World War II. In a 1948 memorandum, the chief of the occupation authorities' religious and cultural resources division, W. K. Bunce, recommended the abolition of Kigensetsu to General Douglas MacArthur's chief of staff, writing that:

This holiday, based entirely on Shinto mythology, has been an occasion for propagandizing the divine origin and superiority of the Japanese race. Due to its official recognition of historical absurdities, it has served as a stumbling block to honest research into the early history of the Japanese people.

Although some other prewar religious holidays were retained in a secular form, such as the Niiname-no-Matsuri holiday in November (which became Labor Thanksgiving Day), the Kigensetsu holiday was effectively abolished when Japan enacted a new national holiday law in 1948.

Even after the occupation ended, there was widespread opposition to reviving the holiday within Japan due to its association with militarism. However, there was also a movement to revive the holiday, in which the Association of Shinto Shrines played a major role.

The holiday was re-established as National Foundation Day in 1966 following the creation by Prime Minister Eisaku Satō of an exploratory council that was chaired by civic reformer Tsûsai Sugawara. Of the ten members of the council, seven voted to advise the prime minister to adopt the holiday; economist Genichi Abe believed the commemoration should be absorbed into New Year's Day to lessen financial impact, author Seiichi Funahashi objected to governmental sponsorship of the holiday, and journalist Sōichi Ōya resigned from the group prior to its final meeting without contributing a vote. In addition, agronomist Azuma Okuda included a separate opinion that the holiday should celebrate the land of Japan rather than glorify its people. Two new national holidays were established at the same time: Respect for the Aged Day on September 15, and Sports Day on October 10.

In a 1966 public opinion poll conducted by the Public Relations Office of the Prime Minister's Office at the request of the National Foundation Day Council, nearly half of the 8,700 respondents (47.4%) favored 11 February as the date of National Foundation Day, with the next most popular choices being 3 May (Constitution Memorial Day, the anniversary of the Constitution of Japan of 1947) and 3 April (the anniversary of the Seventeen-Article Constitution of 604).

== Current practice ==
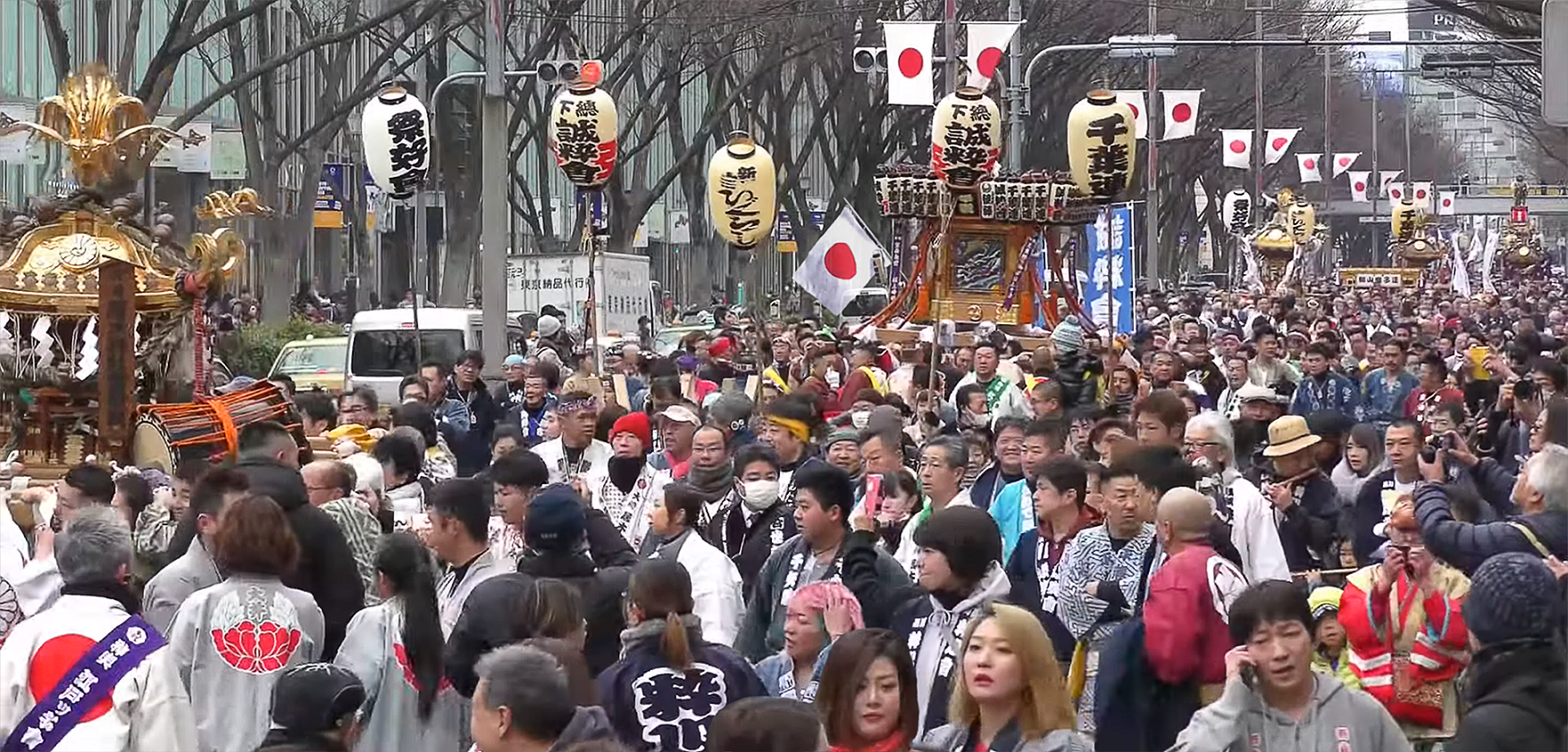
National Foundation Day in a street of Tokyo, 2019

=== Meaning ===
National Foundation Day was added as a national holiday by the revision of the Public Holiday Law in 1966 (Shōwa 41), and was applied from 11 February 1967 (Shōwa 42). Article 2 of the Law Concerning National Holidays (Holiday Law, Law No. 178, 20 July 1948 (国民の祝日に関する法律) ) stipulates that the purpose of National Foundation Day is to:

Nourish a love for the country by commemorating the establishment of the country.

This day is to commemorate the founding of the country, regardless of the day it was founded. The Prime Minister of Japan makes speeches and statements about the importance of National Foundation Day. For example, in 2018, former Prime Minister Shinzo Abe made an official statement:

National Foundation Day is a public holiday for the purpose of "recalling the founding of the nation and cultivating a mindset of love of the nation." It is a national holiday on which each Japanese person thinks about the efforts made by our forebears from ages past in bringing the country to where it is today, and renews his or her hopes for the further development of the nation.

=== Celebrations ===
In contrast with the events associated with earlier Kigensetsu, celebrations for National Foundation Day are relatively moderate. During the post-war period and up to 2000, there were two opposing sentiments: a caution to prevent ultra-nationalism and a desire to revive cultural traditions. As such people generally didn't overtly express nationalism or patriotism in public. As a public holiday, government offices, schools, banks, and many companies are closed.

On the day of the event, festivals such as the "kenkoku-sai" (建国祭) are held at (Shinto shrines and Buddhist temples). There is no government-sponsored ceremony. However, the "National Foundation Day Celebration Central Ceremony" sponsored by the "Japan's National Foundation Day Celebration" is held every year since 2020. There is also an ambassador's attendance. The "National Foundation Day Celebration" and the "Celebration Steering Committee" reorganized into "Japan's National Foundation Day Celebration" and hold their own ceremonies.

The Japan Maritime Self-Defense Force has full dressing of self-defense ships moored at bases and general ports. They hoist the flag of the JMSDF and/or signal flags on MSDF ships and held for expressing good wishes on National Foundation Day. There are also illuminated ships after sunset.

=== Parades ===
The National Foundation Day Celebration Parade is held annually in Tokyo on 11 February.

- Time: starts at 9:00 AM and ends at 2:00 PM.
- Route: 2.7 kilometres (1.7 mi) from Jingu Gaien Ginkgo Avenue (Namiki-dori) -> Aoyama-dori -> Omotesandō -> Meiji Jingu.
- Main event: a party to celebrate the founding of Japan (inside the Association of Shinto Shrines).
- Participants: the parade section has circa 6,750 people and the Mikoshi section around 6,000 people.

== See also ==
- Japanese imperial year
- National Day

== General references ==
- Bix, Herbert P. (2000). Hirohito and the Making of Modern Japan. New York: HarperCollins. ISBN 978-0-06-019314-0. (cloth) (paper).
- Dower, John (2000). Embracing Defeat: Japan in the Wake of World War II. New York: W. W. Norton & Company. ISBN 978-0-393-04686-1. (cloth) (paper).
- Gluck, Carol (1985). Japan's Modern Myths: Ideology in the Late Meiji Period. Princeton: Princeton University Press. ISBN 978-0-691-05449-0. (cloth).
- Hardacre, Helen (1989). Shinto and the State, 1868–1988. Princeton: Princeton University Press. ISBN 978-0-691-07348-4. (cloth) (paper).
- Hutchinson, John; Smith, Anthony David (2000). Nationalism: Critical Concepts in Political Science. London: Routledge. ISBN 978-0-415-20109-4.
- Keene, Donald (1999). Seeds in the Heart: Japanese Literature from Earliest Times to the Late Sixteenth Century. Columbia University Press. p. 80. ISBN 978-0-231-11441-7.
- Lange, Stephen (1992). Emperor Hirohito and Shōwa Japan: A Political Biography. London: Routledge. ISBN 978-0-415-03203-2. (cloth) (paper).
- Neary, Ian (1996). Leaders and Leadership in Japan. London: RoutledgeCurzon. ISBN 978-1-873410-41-7. (cloth).
- Rimmer, Thomas; Gessel, Van C. (2005). The Columbia Anthology of Modern Japanese Literature. New York: Columbia University Press. ISBN 978-0-231-13804-8.
- Ruoff, Kenneth J. (2001). The People's Emperor: Democracy and the Japanese Monarchy, 1945–1995. Harvard University Asia Center. ISBN 978-0-674-01088-8.
