= Golden Week (Japan) =

Japanese public holidays in April/May

- Official name: ゴールデンウィーク (Gōruden Wīku)
- Also called: Ōgon Shūkan (黄金週間; lit. 'golden week'); Haru no Ōgata Renkyū (春の大型連休; lit. 'long spring holiday series')
- Observed by: Japan
- Type: National
- Celebrations: Numerous national holiday events
- Date: 29 April – 5 May
- Duration: 7 days
- Frequency: Annual

Golden Week (Japanese: ゴールデンウィーク, Hepburn: Gōruden Wīku) (Note: Also ゴールデンウイーク, Gōruden Uīku) or Ōgon Shūkan (黄金週間) is a holiday period in Japan from 29 April to 5 May containing multiple public holidays. It is also known as Haru no Ōgata Renkyū (春の大型連休; Long spring holiday series).

One of Japan's largest holiday periods of the year, Golden Week often sees a surge in vacation travel throughout the country. Four days of the week are officially designated as public holidays, with workers often opting to take the full week off.

== Holidays celebrated ==
Golden Week encompasses the following public holidays.

Golden Week holidays
Name	Date
Showa Day (昭和の日, Showa no Hi), 2007–present	29 April
Constitution Memorial Day (憲法記念日, Kenpō Kinenbi), 1949–present	3 May
Greenery Day (みどりの日, Midori no Hi), 2007–present	4 May
Children's Day (子供の日, Kodomo no Hi), also known as Boys' Day or the Feast of Banners, traditionally celebrated as Tango no Sekku (端午の節句).	5 May

Note that Citizen's Holiday (国民の休日, Kokumin no Kyūjitsu) is a generic term for any official holiday. Until 2006, 4 May was an unnamed but official holiday because of a rule that converts any day between two holidays into a new holiday. Japan celebrates Labor Thanksgiving Day, a holiday with a similar purpose to May Day (as celebrated in Europe and North America). When a public holiday lands on a Sunday, the next day that is not already a holiday becomes a holiday for that year. In some cases, a Compensation Holiday (振替休日, Furikae Kyūjitsu) is held on either 30 April or 6 May should any of the Golden Week holidays fall on Sunday; 2012, 2013, 2014, and 2015 have had Compensation Holidays for Shōwa Day, Children's Day, Greenery Day, and Constitution Memorial Day, respectively.

== History ==
The National Holiday Laws, promulgated in July 1948, declared nine official holidays. Since many were concentrated in a week spanning the end of April to early May, many leisure-based industries experienced spikes in their revenues. The film industry was no exception. In 1951, the film Jiyū Gakkō recorded higher ticket sales during this holiday-filled week than any other time in the year (including New Year's and Obon). This prompted the managing director of Daiei Film Co., Ltd. to dub the week "Golden Week" based on the Japanese radio lingo "golden time", which denotes the period with the highest listener ratings. At the time, 29 April was a national holiday celebrating the birth of the Shōwa Emperor. Upon his death in 1989, the day was renamed to Greenery Day (みどりの日, Midori no Hi). In 2007, Greenery Day was moved to 4 May, and 29 April was renamed Shōwa Day to commemorate the late Emperor. The Emperor's Birthday (天長節, Tenchō Setsu) was celebrated from 1927 to 1948 and it is now called The Emperor's Birthday (天皇誕生日, Tennō Tanjōbi). Emperor Naruhito's birthday is on 23 February.

The actual inventor of the slogan was either the company president Masaichi Nagata, or Hideo Matsuyama, a Daiei Film executive and the later president of Dainichi Eihai who also coined the "Silver Week".

=== Transition to Reiwa period (2019) ===
Golden Week in 2019 was particularly long due to the imperial transition, with the succession of new Emperor Naruhito, son of Emperor Emeritus Akihito and Empress Emerita Michiko. The new emperor took the throne on 1 May, which was designated as an additional national holiday. This day also marked the official beginning of a new Japanese period, named Reiwa. Under the Japanese law mentioned prior, this meant that April 30 and May 2 became public holidays that year as well, making 2019's Golden Week last about ten consecutive days, from Saturday 27 April through Monday 6 May.

=== Impact of COVID-19 pandemic (2020–2021) ===
Due to the COVID-19 pandemic in Japan, then-Japanese Prime Minister Shinzo Abe announced that the Golden Week Festival would be cancelled for the first time in both 2020 and 2021. The government had declared the first state of emergency to prevent the spread of the virus in 2020, which extended from April 7 to May 29. Tokyo Governor Yuriko Koike urged the closing of all schools, universities, and colleges, as well as businesses in Kantō region; the public was discouraged from holiday travel during Golden Week to prevent the spread of infection. Japanese residents in Tokyo were advised to stay home for Stay Home Week (ステイホーム週間, Sutei hōmu shūkan). The rebranded "Stay Home Week to Save Lives" ran from April 25 to the 6th of May. Osaka Governor Hirofumi Yoshimura urged schools to close between May 7 and 8, and businesses in the Kansai region were encouraged to extend the holiday period through the weekend until 11 May. Also, in late April 2021, then-Japanese Prime Minister Yoshihide Suga announced that the Golden Week Festival would be cancelled for the second time amid the third state of emergency following a COVID-19 infection surge.

Just two years after the cancellation of muted celebrations, Golden Week Festival returned in Japan, which took place between the 29th of April and 5 May 2022 (without an issuance of a COVID-19 state of emergency (during the Omicron time in the first 18-month-period)). Many Golden Week festivals have resumed, including Hakata Dontaku, Hamamatsu Kite Festival, Hiroshima Flower Festival, and others, which are held across the nation for the first time since the Reiwa period begin in 2019.

== Current practice ==
Many Japanese nationals take paid time off during this holiday, and some companies are closed down completely and give their employees time off. Golden Week is the longest vacation period of the year for many Japanese workers.

=== Travel ===
Golden Week is a popular time for holiday travel, such as many Japanese travel domestically and to a lesser extent internationally.

=== Festivals ===
The Takatsuki Jazz Street Festival is held during Golden Week. It has two days of live jazz performances with 300 acts and over 3,000 artists in 72 different locations in-and-around the center of Takatsuki in northern Osaka.

=== Sports ===
The Super GT Fuji 500 km car race is held on 4 May and has become synonymous with that date in Golden Week.

== See also ==
- Golden Week (China)
- Public holidays in Japan
- Silver Week
