= Happy Monday =

Happy Monday may refer to

- Happy Mondays, an English alternative rock band
- Happy Monday System, public holidays shifted to Mondays in Japan
