= Public holidays in Japan =

Public holidays in Japan (国民の祝日, kokumin no shukujitsu) were first established by the Public Holiday Law (国民の祝日に関する法律, Kokumin no Shukujitsu ni Kansuru Hōritsu; lit. 'An Act on public holidays'; Act No. 178 of 1948) of 1948. It has since been amended 11 times to add additional holidays, the latest being in 2018, for a total of 16 recognized holidays.

Article 3 of this law specifies that when a national holiday falls on a Sunday, the next working day shall become a public holiday, known as furikae kyūjitsu (振替休日; "compensatory public holiday", literally "substitute holiday"). Article 3 also determines that any day that falls between two other national holidays shall also become a holiday, known as kokumin no kyūjitsu (国民の休日; literally "citizens' holiday"). May 4, sandwiched between Constitution Memorial Day on May 3 and Children's Day on May 5, was an annual example of such a holiday until it was replaced by Greenery Day in 2007.

Although it is not an official holiday, most companies voluntarily designate a holiday from December 29 to January 3, or, depending on the industry, from Christmas Eve to January 5. This case is unique in Asia.

== Table of Japanese holidays ==
Name	Date	Remarks	Ref.
New Year's Day (元日, Ganjitsu)	January 1	This national holiday was established in 1948, as a day to celebrate the new year. New Year's Day marks the beginning of Japan's most important holiday season, the New Year season (正月, Shōgatsu), which generally refers to the first one, three or seven days of the year. Although not prescribed by law, many workplaces are closed from December 29 to January 3. Prior to 1948, New Year's Day was a national holiday on which the imperial worship ceremony known as Shihō-hai (四方拝) took place. Japanese New Year celebrations are also held on January 1 and a bit after based on the Tenpō calendar.	
Coming of Age Day (成人の日, Seijin no Hi)	Second Monday of January	This national holiday was established in 1948 as a day to congratulate and encourage people who have reached the age of maturity (20) during the year. Cities and towns throughout the nation hold ceremonies for these people. Originally observed on January 15, in 2000 it was changed to the second Monday of January in accordance with the Happy Monday System.	
National Foundation Day (建国記念の日, Kenkoku Kinen no Hi)	February 11	This national holiday was established in 1966 (and first observed in 1967) as a day to reflect on the establishment of the nation and to nurture a love for the country. From 1872 to 1948, February 11 was known as Kigen-setsu (紀元節), a holiday commemorating the day on which—according to the Nihon Shoki— the legendary Emperor Jimmu is said to have acceded the throne in 660 BCE.	
Emperor's Birthday (天皇誕生日, Tennō Tanjōbi)	February 23	The birthday of the reigning emperor has been a national holiday since 1868. Originally known as Tenchō-setsu (天長節), it was renamed Tennō tanjōbi (天皇誕生日) in 1948. It is currently celebrated on February 23; Emperor Naruhito was born on this day in 1960. Prior to the abdication of Emperor Akihito on April 30, 2019, this holiday was celebrated on December 23, and it was not celebrated in 2019.	
Vernal Equinox Day (春分の日, Shunbun no Hi)	Northward Equinox, Around March 20 (Note: The vernal equinox generally falls on March 20 or March 21. The exact date of the holiday is announced on the first weekday of February of the previous year.)	This national holiday was established in 1948 as a day for the admiration of nature and the love of living things. Prior to 1948, the vernal equinox was an imperial ancestor worship festival called Shunki kōrei-sai (春季皇霊祭).	
Showa Day (昭和の日, Showa no Hi)	April 29	This national holiday was established in 2007 as a day to reflect on the events of the Shōwa period. As the birthday of Hirohito, officially known as Emperor Shōwa, April 29 was originally celebrated as a holiday during his lifetime. Hirohito was born on this day in 1901. (See "The Emperor's Birthday" above.) After the death of Hirohito in 1989, the date continued to be a holiday under the new name "Greenery Day". (See also below.) In 2007, Greenery Day was moved to May 4, and April 29 took the name "Shōwa Day" in honor of the late Emperor. Shōwa Day marks the start of the Golden Week holiday period.	
Constitution Memorial Day (憲法記念日, Kenpō Kinenbi)	May 3	This national holiday was established in 1948, to commemorate the day on which Japan's postwar constitution took effect. Constitution Memorial Day falls during Golden Week.	
Greenery Day (みどりの日, Midori no Hi)	May 4	This national holiday is celebrated as a day to commune with nature and be grateful for its blessings. Originally established in 1989 and observed annually on April 29 (the late Shōwa Emperor's birthday), in 2007 Greenery Day was moved to May 4, and April 29 was renamed "Shōwa Day" (see above.) Greenery Day falls during Golden Week. (From 1985 to 2006, May 4 was a kokumin no kyūjitsu holiday.)	
Children's Day (こどもの日, Kodomo no Hi)	May 5	This national holiday was established in 1948, as a day on which to esteem the personalities of children and plan for their happiness. It is on this day that the Japanese equivalent of the Dragon Boat Festival (端午の節句, Tango no Sekku) is observed. On this day, and for some time before it, families who have a boy in their home may fly koinobori and decorate their homes with armor or samurai dolls. Children's Day marks the end of Golden Week.	
Marine Day (海の日, Umi no Hi)	Third Monday of July	This national holiday was established in 1995 (first observed in 1996) as a day of gratitude for the blessings of the oceans and hoping for the prosperity of Japan. Originally observed on July 20, the holiday was changed to be celebrated on the third Monday of July in accordance with the Happy Monday System starting in 2003.	
Mountain Day (山の日, Yama no Hi)	August 11	This national holiday was established in 2014 (and first observed in 2016), as a day on which to appreciate Japan's mountains. It is intended to coincide with the vacation time usually given during the Bon Festival held in mid-August.	
Respect for the Aged Day (敬老の日, Keirō no Hi)	Third Monday of September	This national holiday was established in 1966 as a day to respect the elderly and celebrate a long life. Originally observed on September 15, it originated as a renaming of Old Folks' Day (老人の日, Rōjin no hi). In 2003, it was changed to the third Monday of September in accordance with the Happy Monday System.	
Autumnal Equinox Day (秋分の日, Shūbun no Hi)	Southward Equinox, Around September 23 (Note: The autumnal equinox generally falls on September 22 or September 23. The exact date of the holiday is announced on the first weekday of February of the previous year.)	This national holiday was established in 1948 as a day on which to honor one's ancestors and remember the dead. Prior to 1948, the autumnal equinox was an imperial ancestor worship festival called Shūki kōrei-sai (秋季皇霊祭).	
Sports Day (スポーツの日, Supōtsu no Hi)	Second Monday of October	This national holiday was established in 1966 as Health and Sports Day (体育の日, Taiiku no hi) as a day on which to enjoy sports and cultivate a healthy mind and body. Originally observed on October 10 to commemorate the anniversary of the opening ceremony of the 1964 Tokyo Olympics, in 2000 it was changed to the second Monday of October in accordance with the Happy Monday System. For 2020, it was changed to July 24 (Friday) instead of October 12 for the opening ceremony of the 2020 Tokyo Olympics, but it was postponed to 2021 due to the COVID-19 pandemic. This was changed once again in 2021, and was moved to July 23, the day of the opening ceremony of the Olympics, instead of October 11.	
Culture Day (文化の日, Bunka no Hi)	November 3	This national holiday was established in 1948. It commemorates the November 3, 1946 announcement of the Constitution. It is recognized as a day to celebrate peace and freedom and promote culture. (Although prior to the establishment of this holiday in 1948, November 3 was also a national holiday called Meiji-Setsu (明治節) commemorating the birthday of Emperor Meiji, the two holidays are ostensibly unrelated.)	
Labor Thanksgiving Day (勤労感謝の日, Kinrō Kansha no Hi)	November 23	This national holiday was established in 1948 as an occasion for praising labor, celebrating production and giving one other thanks. Prior to the establishment of this holiday, November 23 was celebrated as an imperial harvest festival called Niiname-sai (新嘗祭).	

== Holidays in 2018–2026 ==
The national holidays in 2018–2026 are as follows.

Names	2018	2019	2020	2021	2022	2023	2024	2025	2026
New Year's Day (Japanese New Year)	Yes	Yes	Yes	Yes	Yes	Yes	Yes	Yes	Yes
Coming of Age Day	Yes	Yes	Yes	Yes	Yes	Yes	Yes	Yes	Yes
National Foundation Day	Yes	Yes	Yes	Yes	Yes	Yes	Yes	Yes	Yes
The Emperor's Birthday	Yes	No (Note: Akihito's birthday on December 23 under Heisei era, but not observed.)	Yes	Yes	Yes	Yes	Yes	Yes	Yes
Vernal Equinox Day	Yes	Yes	Yes	Yes	Yes	Yes	Yes	Yes	Yes
Golden Week (Showa Day, Constitution Memorial Day, Greenery Day, Children's Day)	Yes	Yes (Note: Special arrangement to celebrate the transition of Emperor Naruhito, effective December 14, 2018.)	Yes (Note: Due to a COVID-19 pandemic in Japan as Stay Home Week to Save Lives.)	Yes	Yes	Yes	Yes	Yes	Yes
Marine Day	Yes	Yes	Yes (Note: As special arrangement for the 2020 Summer Olympics and Paralympics, the dates for Marine Day, Sports Day, and Mountain Day were adjusted for 2020 to be July 23, July 24, and August 10 respectively.)	Yes (Note: With the Summer Olympics and Paralympics rescheduled to 2021, the dates for Marine Day, Sports Day, and Mountain Day are adjusted for 2021 to be July 22, July 23, and August 9 respectively.)	Yes	Yes	Yes	Yes	Yes
Mountain Day	Yes	Yes	Yes	Yes	Yes	Yes	Yes	Yes	Yes
Respect for the Aged Day	Yes	Yes	Yes	Yes	Yes	Yes	Yes	Yes	Yes
Autumnal Equinox Day	Yes	Yes	Yes	Yes	Yes	Yes	Yes	Yes	Yes
Health and Sports Day	Yes	Yes	Yes	Yes	Yes	Yes	Yes	Yes	Yes
Culture Day	Yes	Yes	Yes	Yes	Yes	Yes	Yes	Yes	Yes
Labor Thanksgiving Day	Yes	Yes	Yes	Yes	Yes	Yes	Yes	Yes	Yes

== Events of imperial mourning and celebration ==
In addition to the annual holidays listed above, certain events of celebration or mourning related to the imperial family are also treated as national holidays in the year in which they occur.

There have been six instances of such holidays since the introduction of the Public Holiday Law:

- April 10, 1959: Marriage of Crown Prince Akihito
- February 24, 1989: State Funeral of Emperor Shōwa (Hirohito)
- November 12, 1990: Official Enthronement Ceremony of the Emperor Emeritus (Akihito)
- June 9, 1993: Marriage of Crown Prince Naruhito
- April 30, 2019: Abdication of Emperor Akihito
- October 22, 2019: Official Enthronement Ceremony of the current Emperor (Naruhito)

== Recent changes ==
Beginning in 2000, Japan implemented the Happy Monday System, which moved a number of national holidays to Monday in order to obtain a long weekend.

- Coming-of-Age Day: January 15 → 2nd Monday of January, starting in 2000.
- Marine Day: July 20 → 3rd Monday of July, starting in 2003.
- Respect for the Aged Day: September 15 → 3rd Monday of September, starting in 2003.
- Health and Sports Day: October 10 → 2nd Monday of October, starting in 2000.

In 2006, the country added Shōwa Day, a new national holiday, in place of Greenery Day on April 29, and to move Greenery Day to May 4. These changes took effect in 2007.

In 2014, the House of Councillors decided to add Mountain Day (山の日, Yama no Hi) to the Japanese calendar on August 11, after lobbying by the Japanese Alpine Club. It is intended to coincide with the Bon Festival vacation time, giving Japanese people an opportunity to appreciate Japan's mountains.

With the Japanese imperial transition, the Emperor's Birthday was moved from December 23 to February 23 (the respective birthdays of Emperor Emeritus Akihito and Emperor Naruhito). Due to Akihito's 2019 birthday being after his abdication but Naruhito's before his accession, this holiday was not celebrated in 2019.

As special arrangement for the 2020 Summer Olympics, the 2020 dates for Marine Day, Sports Day, and Mountain Day were moved to July 23, July 24, and August 10 respectively. With the Olympics and Paralympics postponed until 2021 due to the COVID-19 pandemic, the government left this change in place for 2020 and passed an amendment to the Olympic and Paralympic Special Measures Act to make a corresponding change to the holidays in 2021, moving them to July 22, July 23, and August 9 respectively.

== See also ==
- Japanese calendar
- Japanese festivals
- List of Japanese anniversaries and memorial days
- Newspaper holiday (Japan)
- Okinawa Memorial Day

== Works cited ==
- Kōjien, 6th edition
