= Newspaper holiday =

A newspaper holiday (新聞休刊日, shimbunkyuukanbi) or press holiday (休刊日, kyuukanbi) is a monthly holiday in Japan for newspaper delivery companies and newspapers. It was introduced in 1956 in two months per year, and was gradually extended over the decades until 1991, when many newspapers started having one holiday per month. They generally fall on Mondays, or on Tuesdays if a Monday is a national holiday.

Unlike regular dailies, a number of daily sports newspapers continue to publish on newspaper holidays.

In 2015, the newspaper holidays were on January 2, February 9, April 15, May 7, June 15, July 13, August 17, September 14, October 13, November 9 and December 14.
