= Okinawa Memorial Day =

Local observance and public holiday, 23 June

- Official name: 慰霊の日 (Irei no Hi)
- Observed by: Okinawa
- Significance: Remembrance of those lost in the Battle of Okinawa
- Date: June 23
- Next time: June 23, 2026
- Frequency: Annual

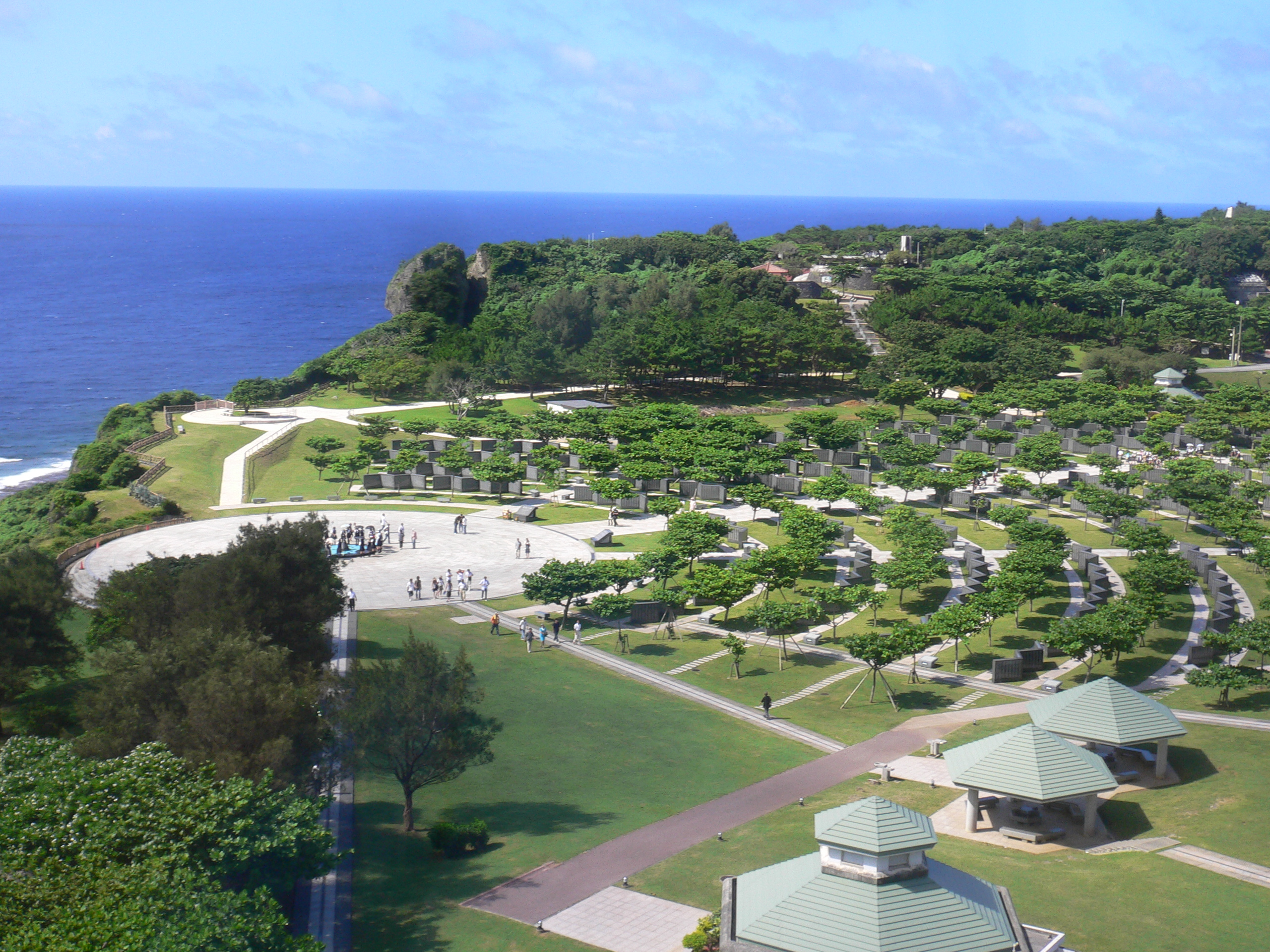
Cornerstone of peace from a distance

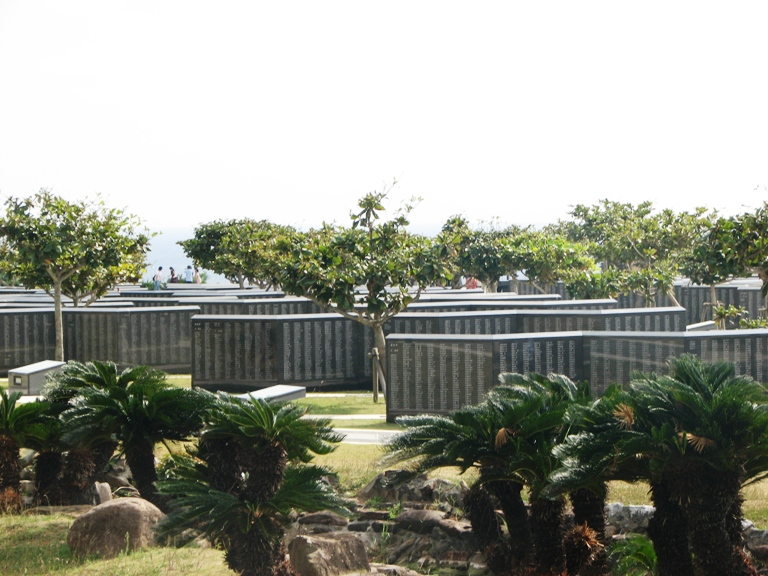
The Cornerstone of Peace, memorial to all those who died in the Battle of Okinawa

Okinawa Memorial Day (慰霊の日, Irei no Hi; lit. "the day to console the dead") is a public holiday observed in Japan's Okinawa Prefecture annually on June 23 to remember the lives lost during the Battle of Okinawa. It is not celebrated nationally throughout Japan. The Battle of Okinawa was the only ground engagement of the Pacific War fought on Japanese soil. Over 240,000 people died and numerous buildings on the island were destroyed along with countless historical documents, artifacts and cultural treasures. It is estimated that about the half of the war victims were local Okinawan residents, among them children.

== History ==
In the Battle of Okinawa, Japanese soldiers as well as inhabitants, were pushed into the Southern border of Okinawa and Mitsuru Ushijima and Isamu Chō, top generals committed suicide on June 22 or 23, 1945. During the occupation of Japan, in 1961, Okinawa Memorial Day was made a holiday by the Government of the Ryukyu Islands in order to remember and pray for their family members and relatives who were killed during the Battle of Okinawa. In 1972, when Okinawa was returned to Japan, Okinawa Memorial Day lost its recognition as a holiday, but this was restored by the prefectural government in 1991. In Okinawa, it is treated like one of the Japanese national public holidays.

== Cornerstone of Peace ==
The Cornerstone of Peace is a monument in Itoman commemorating the Battle of Okinawa and the role of Okinawa during World War II. The names of over two hundred and forty thousand people who died are inscribed on the memorial. It was unveiled on June 23, 1995, in memory of the fiftieth anniversary of the Battle of Okinawa and the end of World War II at Mabuni, Okinawa. It was erected to: (1) Remember those lost in the war, and pray for peace; (2) Pass on the lessons of war; and (3) Serve as a place for meditation and learning. Another expression is Okinawa Peace Park. On June 23, or Okinawa Memorial Day, memorial services are held every year with the attendance of the prime minister.
