= Shimotsuki (disambiguation) =

Shimotsuki (Japanese: 霜月; "month of frost") is the traditional name of the month of November in the Japanese calendar and a Japanese surname. It can also refer to:

- Haruka Shimotsuki, Japanese singer and doujin composer
- Japanese destroyer Shimotsuki, a Japanese naval destroyer, sunk in World War II
