= Shōwa Day =

Japanese annual holiday

Showa Day
- Official name: 昭和の日 (Shōwa no Hi)
- Observed by: Japan
- Type: Public
- Significance: Honors the birthday of Emperor Shōwa (Hirohito), the reigning Emperor from 1926 to 1989
- Date: April 29
- Frequency: Annual
- Related to: The Emperor's Birthday

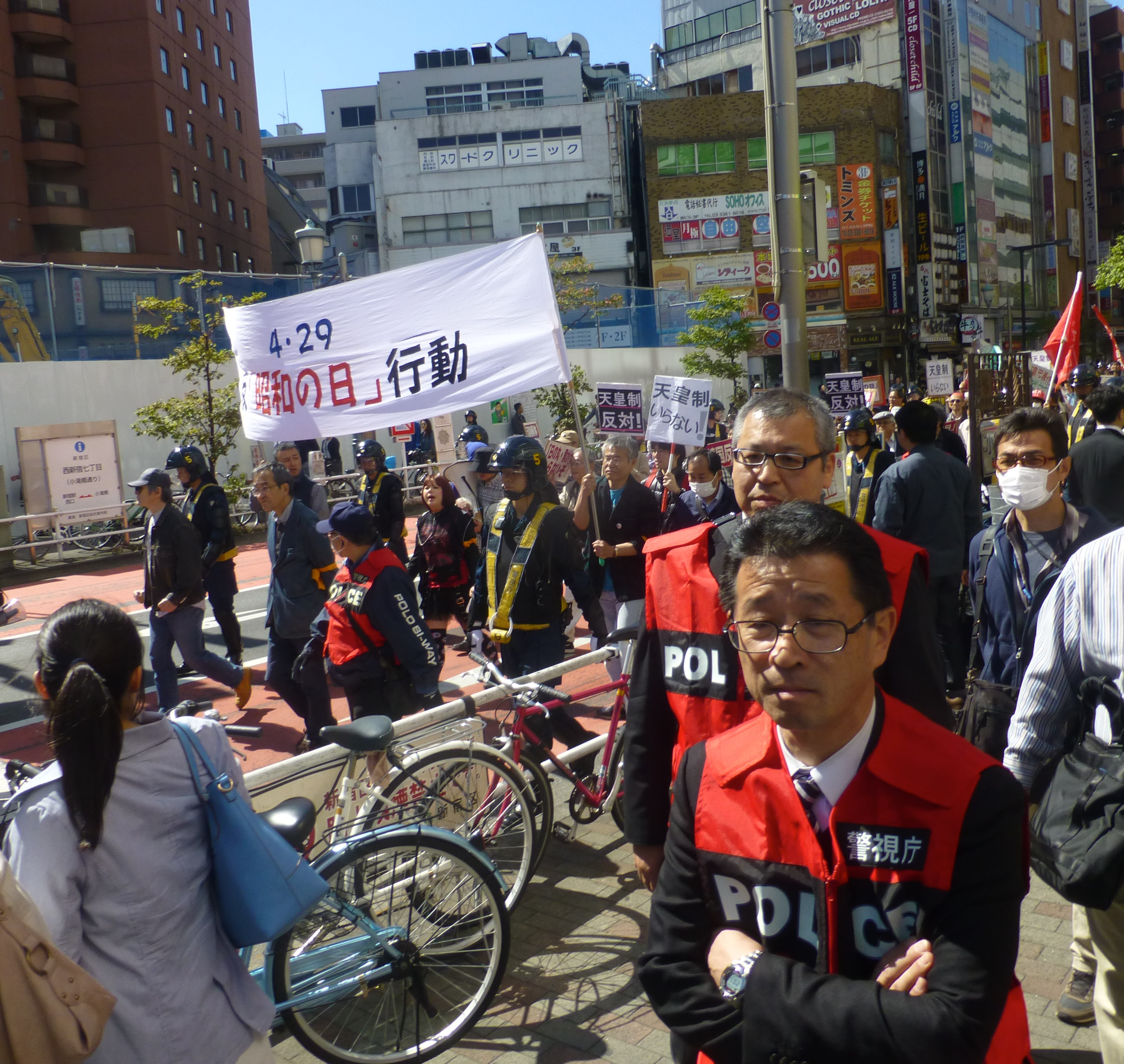
A protest against Shōwa Day, 2016

Showa Day (昭和の日, Shōwa no Hi) is a public holiday in Japan held on April 29. It honors the birthday of Emperor Shōwa (Hirohito), the reigning emperor from 1926 to 1989. According to the Democratic Party of Japan, the purpose of the holiday is to encourage public reflection on the turbulent 62 years of Hirohito's reign, ranging from totalitarianism to the post-war reconstruction and transition into a democratic state.

== History ==
Emperor Hirohito died on January 7, 1989. April 29 was subsequently no longer celebrated as The Emperor's Birthday but instead as Greenery Day, part of Japan's Golden Week. After a series of failed legislative attempts beginning in 2000, the April 29 holiday was finally renamed Shōwa Day in 2007 with support from the ruling coalition composed of the Liberal Democratic Party and Komeito, and the largest opposition Democratic Party of Japan. Greenery Day was moved from April 29 to May 4.

Tetsuzo Fuyushiba from Komeito stated that "It's a day to remember the Showa era. We're not proposing it for the purpose of praising the war, nor does it have anything to do with the Emperor." According to the then-main opposition party, the Democratic Party of Japan (which backed the bill for the first time after many years of refusal), the holiday encourages public reflection on the turbulent 63 years of Hirohito's reign rather than glorifying the emperor himself. On the other hand, the Japanese Communist Party condemned the move and argued that the Japanese Constitution is based on remorse for the war of aggression, and celebrating peace on Hirohito's birthday would not be appropriate. Hirohito's reign saw, among other things, the end of the Taishō Democracy, the 1931 Japanese invasion of Manchuria, a period of "government by assassination" including the attempted coups of May 15, 1932 and February 26, 1936, the rise of the totalitarian Taisei Yokusankai, World War II, atomic bombings of Hiroshima and Nagasaki, the post-war occupation, the Anpo protests, the 1964 Summer Olympics and Paralympics in Tokyo, the North Korean abductions of Japanese citizens, and the Japanese post-war economic miracle.

Years	April 29	May 4
before 1988	The Emperor's Birthday	Non-holiday
1988	The Emperor's Birthday	National day of rest
1989–2006	Greenery Day	National day of rest
2007–present	Shōwa Day	Greenery Day

== See also ==
- Holidays of Japan
- Japanese calendar
