= Niiname-no-Matsuri =

Japanese harvest ritual

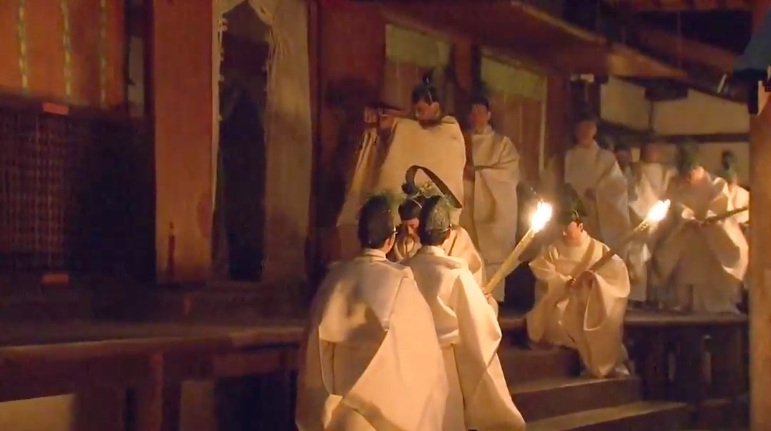
- Observed by: Japan
- Type: Religious
- Significance: harvest ritual
- Date: November 23
- Next time: 23 November 2026
- Related to: Labor Thanksgiving Day, Daijosai

The Niiname-sai (新嘗祭, also read Shinjō-sai and Niiname-no-Matsuri) is a Japanese harvest ritual. The ritual is celebrated by the Emperor of Japan, who thanks the Shinto deities for a prosperous year and prays for a fruitful new year. It takes place near the Three Palace Sanctuaries in the Tokyo Imperial Palace and at several large Shinto shrines. The first Niiname-sai for a new emperor is known as the Daijō-sai (大嘗祭), and is part of his enthronement ceremonies.

In pre-modern Japan, the date of the Niiname-sai was moveable, taking place on the last Day of the Rabbit of the eleventh month of the old Japanese lunar calendar, but in the Meiji period the date was fixed at November 23, and this date became a national holiday, Labor Thanksgiving Day, in the Shōwa period after World War II.

The Engishiki specified imperial involvement with four festivals, the Kinen-sai, the two Ōharaes and Niiname-no-Matsuri for tribute.

In ancient times, people held domestic rites called Kinen-sai in the February or April and Niiname-sai in November. During these rites, people worshiped their ancestors, the god of food, and the hearth deity. They believed the spirits of their ancestors (Oyagami) came to them through the rice.

== Ceremony ==
During the Niiname-sai, an ancient Shinto ritual that says thanks for the crops of the previous year and prays for fruitfulness in the following year, the Emperor of Japan says thanks to his gods for the fall harvest. It is held in the Imperial Palace, as well as other shrines including Ise Grand Shrine and Izumo Shrine.According to the 1908 Imperial Household Rites Ordinance, the Niiname-sai ranks among the taisai (major rites) and is conducted over two days: one dedicated to the kami, the other to the emperor himself. The emperor makes food offerings to Amaterasu twice: once at sunset on November 23 and again at dawn on November 24, presenting sake, rice porridge, and steamed rice on wooden vessels called kashiwa, set upon a red mat known as kegomo. Following the evening meal (yūmike), the emperor undergoes a nighttime purification (kessai) and, after a change of robes (koromogae), prepares the offerings for the following day.

== Date ==
Traditionally, it was held on the last Day of the Rabbit in the eleventh month of the old lunar calendar.

Since the Meiji era the date has been fixed on November 23, which corresponds to the modern public holiday Labor Thanksgiving Day, which was introduced in 1948.

As a kigo, the name of the ritual is associated with winter.

== Name ==
Niiname-sai is the common name of the festival, but the same kanji can also be read Jinshō-sai or Niiname-no-Matsuri. Niiname can also be read Niinae, Niinai, Niwanai, Niwanami or Nyūnami.

The first Niiname-sai following the accession of a new emperor is called the Daijō-sai (大嘗祭, also read Ōname-Matsuri and Ōnie-no-Matsuri).

== In literature ==
Book 19 of the Man'yōshū includes six poems (numbered 4273 to 4278) composed on the 25th day of the eleventh month of 752, the "Niiname-kai poems". The "nyūnami" is alluded to in one of the azuma-uta (songs of eastern Japan) included in Book 14.

== See also ==
- Japanese Imperial Rituals
- Saiten

== Works cited ==
- "Niiname-sai". Britannica Kokusai Dai-Hyakkajiten (in Japanese). Encyclopædia Britannica, Inc. 2014.
- "Shinjō-sai". Daijisen (in Japanese). Shogakukan. 1998.
- "Daijō-sai". Daijisen (in Japanese). Shogakukan. 1998.
