= Culture Day =

Public holiday in Japan

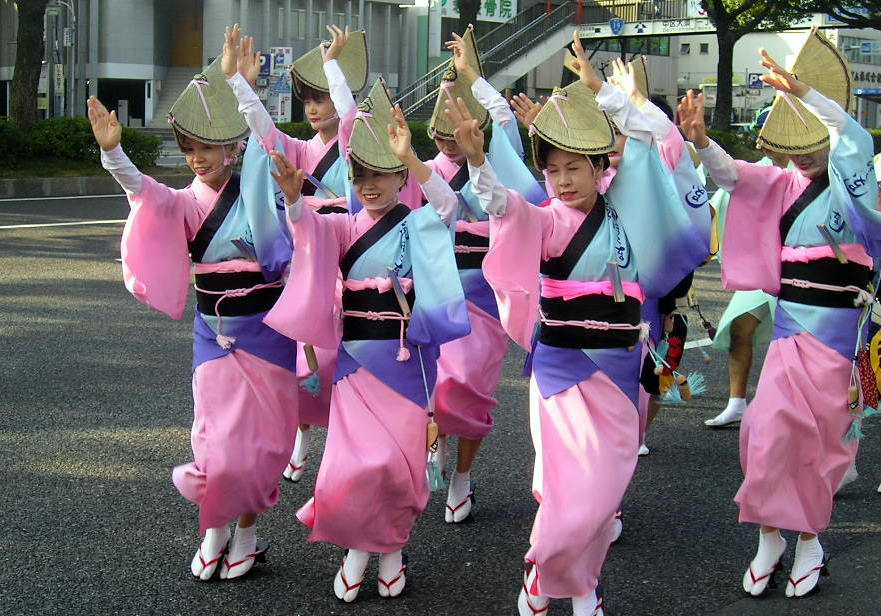
- Culture Day dancers in Nagoya
- Official name: 文化の日 (Bunka no Hi)
- Observed by: Japan
- Type: Public
- Significance: Promotes culture, the arts, and academic endeavour
- Celebrations: art exhibitions, parades, and award ceremonies for distinguished artists and scholars.
- Date: November 3
- Frequency: Annual

Culture Day (文化の日, Bunka no Hi) is a public holiday in Japan held annually on November 3 to promote culture, the arts, and academic endeavour. Festivities typically include art exhibitions, parades, and award ceremonies for distinguished artists and scholars.

== History ==
Culture Day was first held in 1948 to commemorate the announcement of the post-war Japanese constitution on November 3, 1946.

November 3 was first celebrated as a national holiday in 1868 when it was called Tenchō-setsu (天長節), a holiday held in honour of the birthday of the reigning Emperor—at that time, Emperor Meiji (see also The Emperor's Birthday). Following Meiji's death in 1912, November 3 ceased to be a holiday until 1927, when his birthday was given its specific holiday, known as Meiji-setsu (明治節). This was subsequently discontinued with the announcement of Culture Day in 1948.

There have been several meetings in the National Diet held in attempts to rename the holiday to "Meiji Day" (Meiji no Hi (明治の日)), spearheaded by the Meiji Day Promotion Council (Meiji no Hi Suishin Kyougikai (明治の日推進協議会)), with the first being held on March 6, 2012, and attended by 18 members of parliament. One such meeting was held on November 1, 2016, and was attended by 13 members of parliament, including Tomomi Inada, Keiji Furuya, Eiichiro Washio, and Takeshi Noma. In April 2022, an all-party parliamentary group supportive of renaming Culture Day and headed by Keiji Furuya numbered 92 members of parliament, with members from the LDP, CDP, Nippon Ishin no Kai, and Democratic Party For the People.

== Current practice ==
As Culture Day exists to promote the arts and various fields of academic endeavour, local and prefectural governments typically choose this day to hold art exhibits, culture festivals, and parades. For example, Hakone in Kanagawa Prefecture holds the annual Feudal Lord's Parade (箱根大名行列, Hakone Daimyō Gyōretsu) to exhibit Edo period clothing and costumes. Primary and secondary schools often have a "culture festival" on or near this day.

Since 1936, the award ceremony for the Order of Culture has been held on this day. Given by the Emperor himself to those who have significantly advanced science, the arts or culture, it is one of the highest honours bestowed by the Imperial Family. The prize is not restricted to Japanese citizens. For instance, it was awarded to the Apollo 11 astronauts upon their successful return from the Moon, as well as literary scholar Donald Keene.

== Events ==
- The Order of Culture is held at the Tokyo Imperial Palace.
- The Japan Maritime Self-Defense Force will decorate the self-defense ships moored at bases and general ports.
- An art festival sponsored by the Agency for Cultural Affairs is held around Culture Day.
- Some museums and galleries offer free admission and various events.
- The All Japan Kendo Championship, held at the Nippon Budokan, is broadcast live on NHK General TV.

In addition, this day is considered a "sunny day" with a high probability of sunny weather. It is statistically one of the clearest days of the year. Between 1965 and 1996, there were only three years where it rained in Tokyo on Culture Day.
