= Constitution Memorial Day =

Public holiday in Japan

- Official name: 憲法記念日 (Kenpō Kinenbi)
- Observed by: Japan
- Type: Public
- Significance: Celebrates the entering into force of the 1947 Constitution of Japan
- Date: May 3
- Frequency: Annual

Constitution Memorial Day (憲法記念日, Kenpō Kinenbi) is a public holiday in Japan. It takes place on May 3 in celebration of the enactment of the 1947 Constitution of Japan. It is a part of the collection of holidays known as Golden Week.

== History ==
After the bombings of Hiroshima and Nagasaki, the Japanese side prepared the notification of surrender to allied forces through protecting power Switzerland, and the Showa Emperor announced the declaration of the end of the war on August 15. Over the next two years, Japan and U.S. General Douglas MacArthur cooperated in drafting the new constitution, which was ratified by the House of Representatives on August 24, 1946, by the House of Peers on October 6, and by the Privy Council on October 29, then promulgated by the Emperor on November 3, 1946, the Emperor Meiji's birthday, and came into effect on May 3, 1947.

Initially, Prime Minister Shigeru Yoshida wanted to observe Constitution Memorial Day on November 3 because it was already a holiday; furthermore, the date of the signing also coincided with the start of trials by the International Military Tribunal for the Far East. However, he did not get his way and the Public Holiday Law of 1948 (in Japanese) set the date as May 3.

== Celebration ==
Constitution Memorial Day is a time to reminisce about the events of Japan's history. Constitution Memorial Day in Japan is a part of Golden Week. In 2019 a one-off Platinum Week was held, with extra events and a longer duration, to commemorate the inauguration of the new emperor, Naruhito.

== See also ==
- Constitution Day in other countries
- Constitution of Japan
- Culture Day (November 3) – the paired companion holiday in Japan
- Holidays of Japan
