= Mountain Day =

Name for various local and national holidays

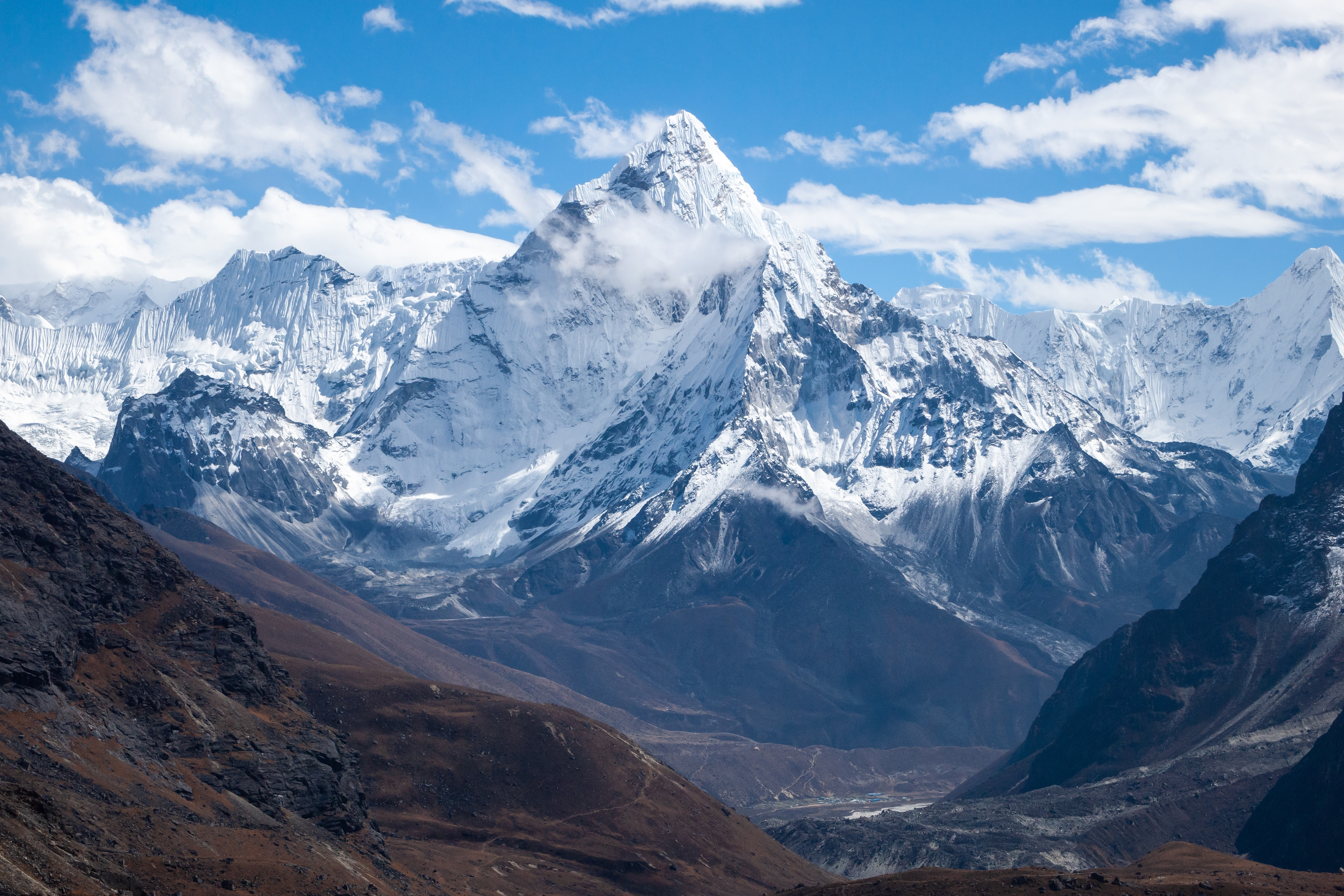
Himalayas, Ama Dablam, Nepal

Mountain Day refers to three different and unrelated events: (1) Mountain Day, a student celebration in some colleges in the United States in which classes are cancelled without prior notice, and the student body heads to the mountains or a park, (2) International Mountain Day, held each year on 11 December, which was established by the UN General Assembly in 2003 to encourage sustainable development in mountains, and (3) Mountain Day, a national holiday in Japan as of 2016.

== United States ==
Mountain Day dates back to at least 1838, when the students of Mount Holyoke College headed off to Mount Holyoke. Williams College students have been climbing Mount Greylock, the highest mountain in Massachusetts, to celebrate Mountain Day since 1857, although the tradition was not practiced from 1935 to 1981. Smith College declared its Mountain Day in 1877.

Juniata College in Pennsylvania established its Mountain Day in 1896. Colby-Sawyer College's Mountain Day is stated to have started in the 1850s, although the first account of it in the student newspaper is not listed until June 1893. Elmira College instituted Mountain Day in 1918.

Hollins University has a similar tradition called Tinker Day on which people don costumes and hike Tinker Mountain.

== International (UN) ==
December 11, "International Mountain Day", was designated by the United Nations General Assembly in 2003. The General Assembly "encouraged the international community to organize events at all levels on that day to highlight the importance of sustainable mountain development."

International Mountain Day is observed every year with a different theme relevant to sustainable mountain development. FAO is the U.N. organization mandated to lead observance of International Mountain Day.

The theme for International Mountain Day 2010 was "Mountain minorities and indigenous peoples." It aims to raise awareness about indigenous peoples and minorities who live in mountain environments and the relevance of their cultural heritage, traditions and customs.

On International Mountain Day 2018, Josué Lorca, president of Venezuela’s National Parks Institute, traveled to the mountains of the Sierra Nevada de Mérida, to announce measures intended to lengthen the life of Venezuela's last remaining glacier.

The theme for International Mountain Day 2025, “Glaciers matter for water, food and livelihoods in mountains and beyond”, signaled increasing concern about the melting of glaciers across the world, also reflected in the declaration of 2025 as the International Year of Glaciers' Preservation.

== Japan ==
In May 2014, it was announced that Mountain Day will be celebrated as a public holiday every August 11, beginning in 2016. Supporters of the holiday included legislators Seishiro Eto and the Japanese Alpine Club. The legislation states that the holiday is to provide "opportunities to get familiar with mountains and appreciate blessings from mountains."

As special arrangement for the 2020 Summer Olympics, the 2020 date for Mountain Day was moved to August 10. With the Olympics and Paralympics postponed until 2021 due to the COVID-19 pandemic, the government left this change in place for 2020 and passed an amendment to the Olympic and Paralympic Special Measures Act to make a corresponding change to the holiday in 2021, moving it to August 9.

== Other ==
=== Armenia ===
In connection with the UN's International Mountain Day, Armenia has dedicated 9 October as "Day of the Mountains."

== See also ==
- International Mountain Rescue Day
- Outfly, Wartburg College fall holiday
- Leaf peeping
