= Sports Day (Japan) =

Public holiday in Japan

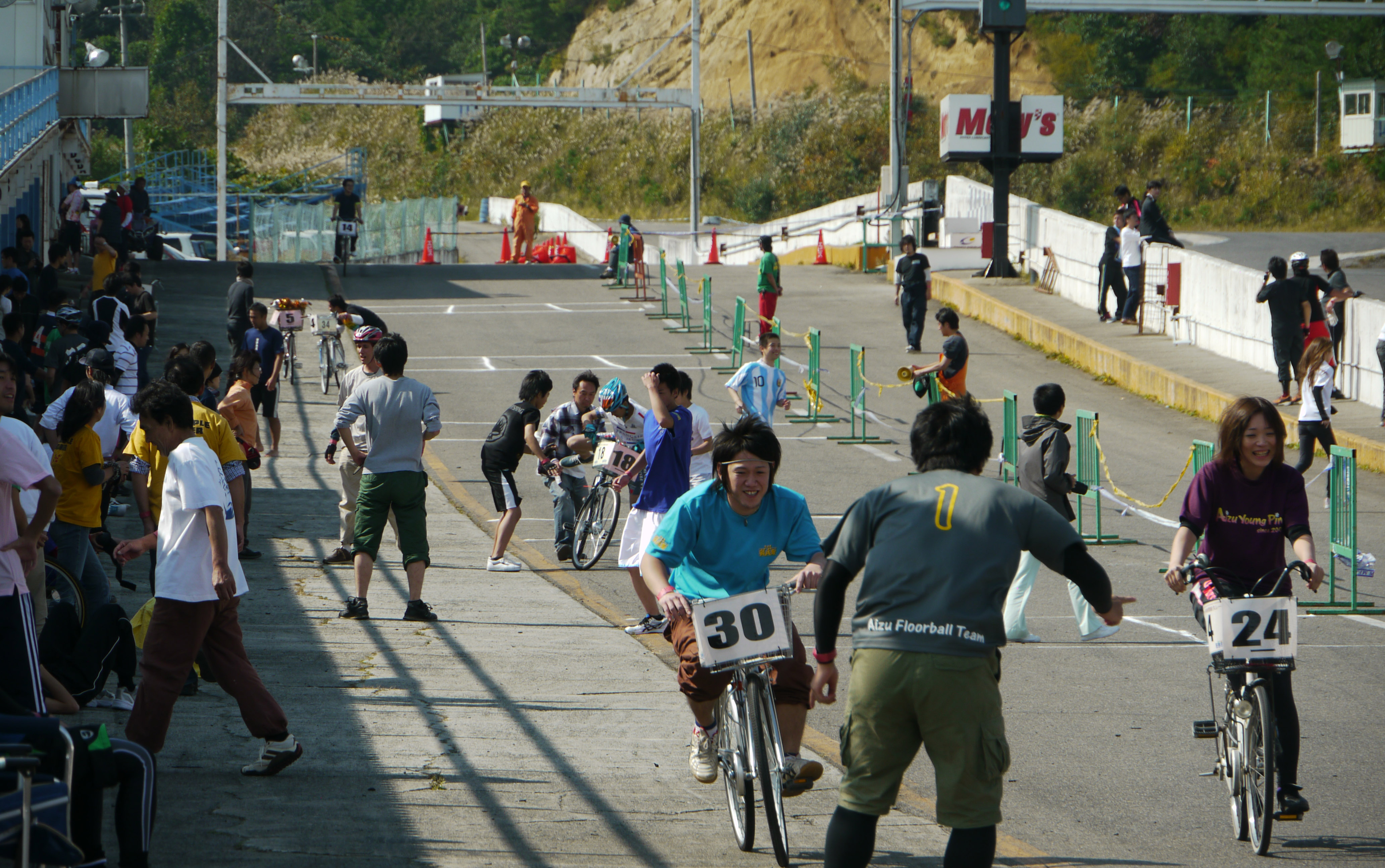
- A cycling event for Health and Sports Day (体育の日) in 2011 near the city of Nihonmatsu, Fukushima
- Official name: スポーツの日 (Supōtsu no hi)
- Also called: Health and Sports Day; Health-Sports Day
- Observed by: Japan
- Type: Public
- Significance: Commemorates the opening of the 1964 Summer Olympics in Tokyo
- Celebrations: Sports festival at schools and communities
- Date: Second Monday in October
- 2024 date: October 14
- 2025 date: October 13
- 2026 date: October 12
- 2027 date: October 11
- Frequency: Annual

Sports Day (スポーツの日, Supōtsu no hi), formerly Health and Sports Day (体育の日, Taiiku no hi; "Physical education day"), is a public holiday in Japan held annually on the second Monday in October. It commemorates the opening of the 1964 Summer Olympics held in Tokyo, and exists to promote sports and an active lifestyle.

== History and current practice ==
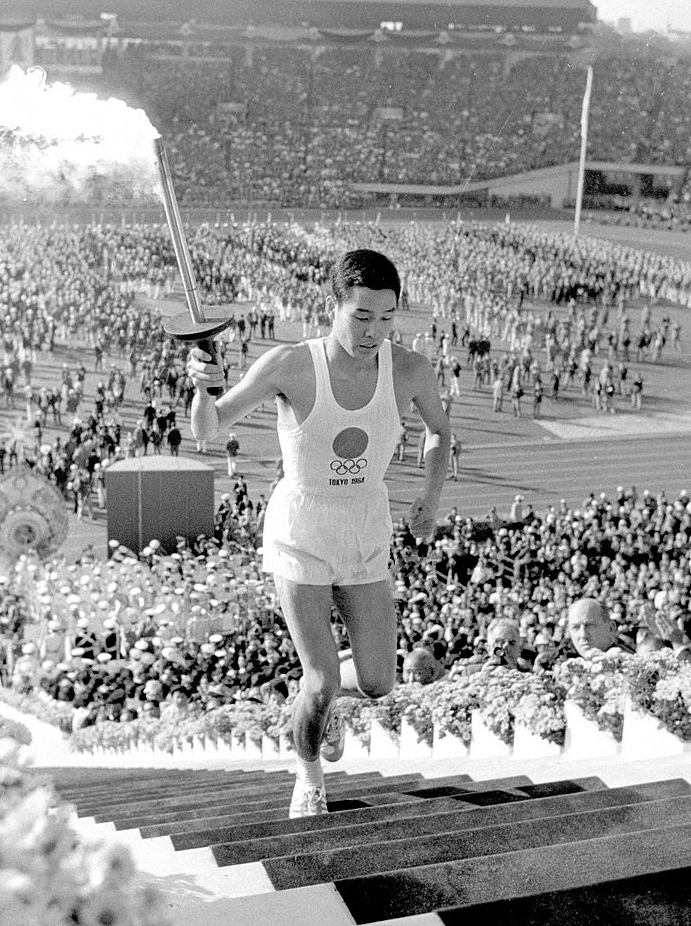
Sports Day was established since the opening ceremony of the Tokyo Olympics was held in 1964

The first Health and Sports Day was held on October 10, 1966, two years after the 1964 Summer Olympics. October was chosen for the unusually late Summer Olympics to avoid the Japanese rainy season, and Health and Sports Day continues to be one of the fairest days of the year.

In 2000, as a result of the Happy Monday System, Health and Sports Day was moved to the second Monday in October.

As Sports Day is a day to promote sports and physical and mental health, many schools and businesses choose this day to hold their annual Field Day (運動会, Undō-kai), or sports day. This typically consists of a range of physical events ranging from more traditional track-and-field events such as the 100 metres or 4 x 100 metres relay to more uncommon events such as the tug of war and the "Cavalry Battle" (騎馬戦, kiba-sen).

Most communities and schools across Japan celebrate Sports Day with a sports festival which is similar to a mini Olympics. These festivals include many of the traditional track and field events, such as 4 × 100 m relay, 100m sprinting, and long jump, as well as many other events. Some of the events include: ball toss, tug of war, rugby-ball dribbling races, sack races, and so on. Another common event is often simply called the “exciting relay”, which is an obstacle course relay including any number of different challenges: Three-legged races, making a stretcher with a blanket and bamboo poles and then carrying an “injured” teammate, laundry hanging, tug-o-war, crawling on hands and knees under a net, and doing cartwheels across a mat.

The festival usually begins with a parade featuring all the different teams that will be participating: it could be divided by neighbourhood, class, geographic area, or school. There is sometimes a local marching band providing music. Once the parade has gone around the field and lined up in the middle, the band will play Kimigayo and the Japanese flag will be raised. Local officials will make speeches welcoming everyone. Often everyone will spread out across the grounds for group stretching (this stretching routine was developed by the government and is done daily by many Japanese people; the stretching routine music is broadcast daily on the radio and TV). Then it is time to start the events.

Beginning in 2020, Health and Sports Day was permanently renamed Sports Day (スポーツの日, Supōtsu no hi), as the word "sports" is more broad than "physical education" and also implies voluntary enjoyment. This change mirrors other organizations that have made or plan to make corresponding changes to their name in Japanese, such as the Japan Sports Association and the National Sports Festival of Japan.

As a special arrangement for the 2020 Summer Olympics, the 2020 date for Sports Day was moved to July 24, to coincide with the opening of the Olympics. With the Olympics and Paralympics postponed until 2021 due to the COVID-19 pandemic, the government left this change in place for 2020 and passed an amendment to the Olympic and Paralympic Special Measures Act to make a corresponding change to the holiday in 2021, moving it to July 23.
