= Respect for the Aged Day =

Public holiday in Japan

- Official name: 敬老の日 (Keirō no Hi)
- Observed by: Japan
- Type: Public
- Significance: Honor elderly citizens
- Date: Third Monday in September
- 2025 date: September 15
- 2026 date: September 21
- 2027 date: September 20
- 2028 date: September 18
- Frequency: annual

Respect for the Aged Day (敬老の日, Keirō no Hi) is a public holiday in Japan celebrated annually to honor elderly citizens. It started in 1966 as a national holiday and was held on every September 15. Since 2003, Respect for the Aged Day is held on the third Monday of September due to the Happy Monday System.

This national holiday traces its origins to 1947, when Nomadani-mura (later Yachiyo-cho, currently Taka-cho), Hyōgo Prefecture, proclaimed September 15 Old Folks' Day (Toshiyori no Hi). Its popularity spread nationwide, and in 1966 it took its present name and status. Annually, Japanese media take the opportunity to feature the elderly, reporting on the population and highlighting the oldest people in the country.

== Commemorative silver sake cups ==
Since 1963, the Japanese government has given a commemorative silver sake cup to Japanese who reach the age of 100. In 1963, the number was 153, but with numbers increasing, the government decided to reduce the size of the cup to cut costs in 2009. In 2014, 29,357 received a cup. In 2017, Japan honored 32,097 people (27,461 women and 4,636 men) who turned 100 years old; they each received congratulatory letter and souvenir sake cup from the Prime Minister. According to this report the solid sterling silver cups were replaced with nickel alloy silver plated design which halved the per-unit cost, saving $1-million in the annual budget.

== Celebration ==
On this holiday, people return home to visit and pay respect to the elders. Some people volunteer in neighborhoods by making and distributing free lunch boxes to older citizens. Entertainment is sometimes provided by teenagers and children with various keirokai (events to celebrate elders) performances. Special television programs are also featured by Japanese media on this holiday.

As the birthplace of Respect for the Aged Day, Taka-Town in Hyōgo Prefecture created the Respect for the Aged Song, Kitto Arigatō (Thank You, Sure), through a public contest in 2013.
