= The Emperor's Birthday =

National holiday in Japan

Emperor's Birthday
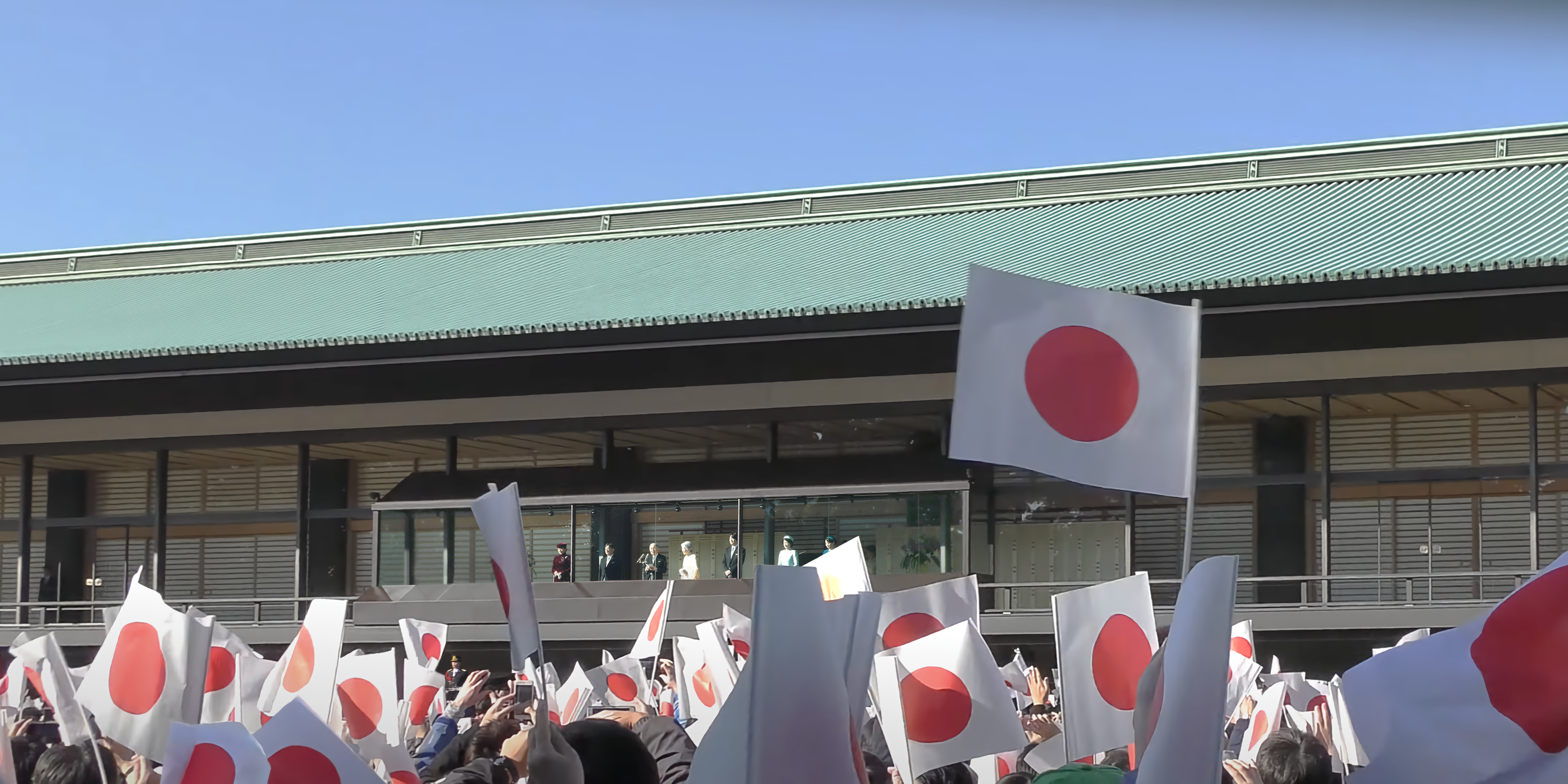
- Well-wishers waving flags at the Tokyo Imperial Palace on Emperor Akihito's birthday in 2017
- Official name: Tennō tanjōbi (天皇誕生日)
- Also called: Tenchōsetsu (天長節) (−1948)
- Observed by: Japan
- Type: Public
- Significance: Marks the birthday of the Emperor of Japan
- Celebrations: Public ceremony at the Tokyo Imperial Palace, imperial greetings
- Date: 23 February
- Next time: 23 February 2027
- Frequency: Annual

Emperor's Birthday (Japanese: 天皇誕生日, Hepburn: Tennō tanjōbi) is an annual public holiday in Japan celebrating the birthday of the reigning emperor, which is currently 23 February as Emperor Naruhito was born on that day in 1960. It is enforced by the Emperor Abdication Law passed in 2017.

== History of holiday ==
=== Ancient – medieval ===
The name of Tenchosetsu (天長節) is ancient, and derived from the birthday of Emperor Xuanzong of Tang. It was changed to "Chiaki-bushi" (千秋節) in 729 in the first year of Tenpyō, but it was renamed to "Tencho-setsu" (天長節) in the 7th year of Tenpyo (748 in the first year of Katsuho) 19 years later. "Tencho" (天長) is taken from Laozi's "Tencho Chikyu" (天長地久).

The earliest historical record of an Emperor's birthday celebrations relates to the 6th year of Hōki in Emperor Kōnin's reign (775 CE). The Emperor's birthday was already celebrated during the Heian period. This is recorded in the record of Hōki 10 (779). It is recorded that:

This day being the Tencho, a great drinking feast was held for all the ministers, fine sake that are favoured [by the Emperor] were presented. After the feast, stipends were awarded. (Old Japanese: 是日天長大酺群臣献翫好酒食宴畢賜禄有差)

An edict dated the 11th day of the Ninth month is also recorded:

The 13th day of the Tenth birthday being Our birthday, each year on this day, it is both emotional and celebratory. On this day, all the monks and nuns of the monasteries must on this day turn the sutras and perform the rituals, and no animals should be butchered throughout the country, and all of the officials of inner and outer courts are awarded feasts for the day. The day will be called Tenchosetsu. Thus the moral merit is used to repay the deceased imperial mother, and the celebration is spread throughout the land. (十月十三日是朕生日毎至此辰威慶兼集宜令諸寺僧尼毎年是日転経行道海内諸国竝宜断屠内外百官賜酺宴一日仍名此日為天長節庶使廻斯功徳虔奉先慈以此慶情普被天下)

There is also a description in the "Oyudono Diary" (お湯殿の上の日記) as a record of the Muromachi period.

=== Modern – contemporary ===
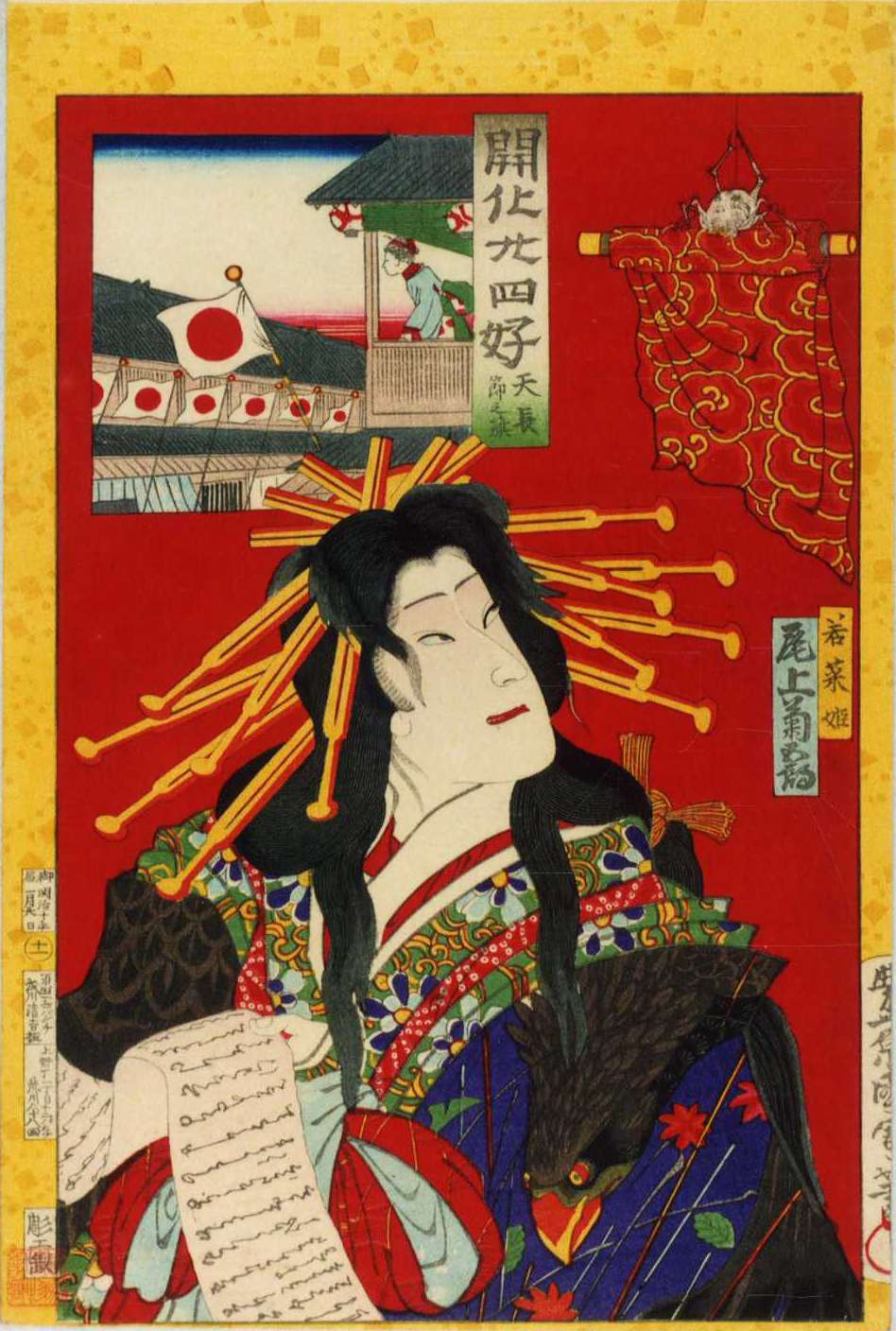
Flag for the Emperor (Tenchōsetsu) 1877

On 26 August 1868 (11 October 1868), a decree by the Daijo-kan said, "22 September, the Emperor's Birthday is equivalent to the Emperor's Birthday." On 22 September (6 November 1868), the Emperor's Birthday was celebrated as a national holiday. In the 2nd year of the Meiji era (1869), the ministers of each country were invited to the Enryokan to receive a drink, and in the 3rd year of the Meiji era (1870), various officials, non-employees, Kazoku, etc. worshiped. The ministers and below received a feast at each ministry, and royal gun salute was shot on various warships. The ritual of the Emperor's Festival was completed in 1872, in the same year of the Emperor's Birthday.

Until 1948, it was called Tenchōsetsu (天長節, "Tenchō Festival"). Tenchōsetsu paralleled Chikyūsetsu (地久節), "Chikyū Festival", which referred to the Empress consort's birthday. The two names originate from the idiom in Chinese: 天長地久, borrowed from Lao Tzu's Tao Te Ching during the reign of Emperor Kōnin (708–782 CE), meaning "The sky and the earth, the universe is eternal," and expressed a hope for the eternal longevity of the reigning Emperor. After World War II in 1948, the government renamed it to Tennō tanjōbi (天皇誕生日; lit. "emperor's birthday") and made the day a public holiday. Under the law, when the throne passes to a new Emperor, the National Diet must convene and change the holiday date's to that of the new Emperor's birthday. Thus, there exists a small chance that the former Emperor's birthday may come before the change can be made.

During the reign of Emperor Hirohito (the Shōwa era, 1926–1989), the Emperor's birthday was observed on 29 April. That date remained a public holiday, posthumously renamed Greenery Day in 1989 and Shōwa Day in 2007.

On 30 April 2019, the 125th Emperor Akihito abdicated as per the Constitution of Japan and in accordance with the Imperial Code Special Law Concerning the Retirement of the Emperor. Because Akihito's birthday is 23 December and his successor Naruhito's is 23 February, 2019 was the first year since the introduction of the Holidays Act in 1948 that there were no Emperor's Birthday celebrations.

Because of concerns related to the COVID-19 pandemic, the public celebrations for Naruhito's birthday were cancelled in 2020 (Reiwa 2), 2021 (Reiwa 3) and 2022 (Reiwa 4). However, the emperor addressed and thanked the public for their wishes in a press conference and a recorded video message 2020 and 2021 respectively.

== Observance ==
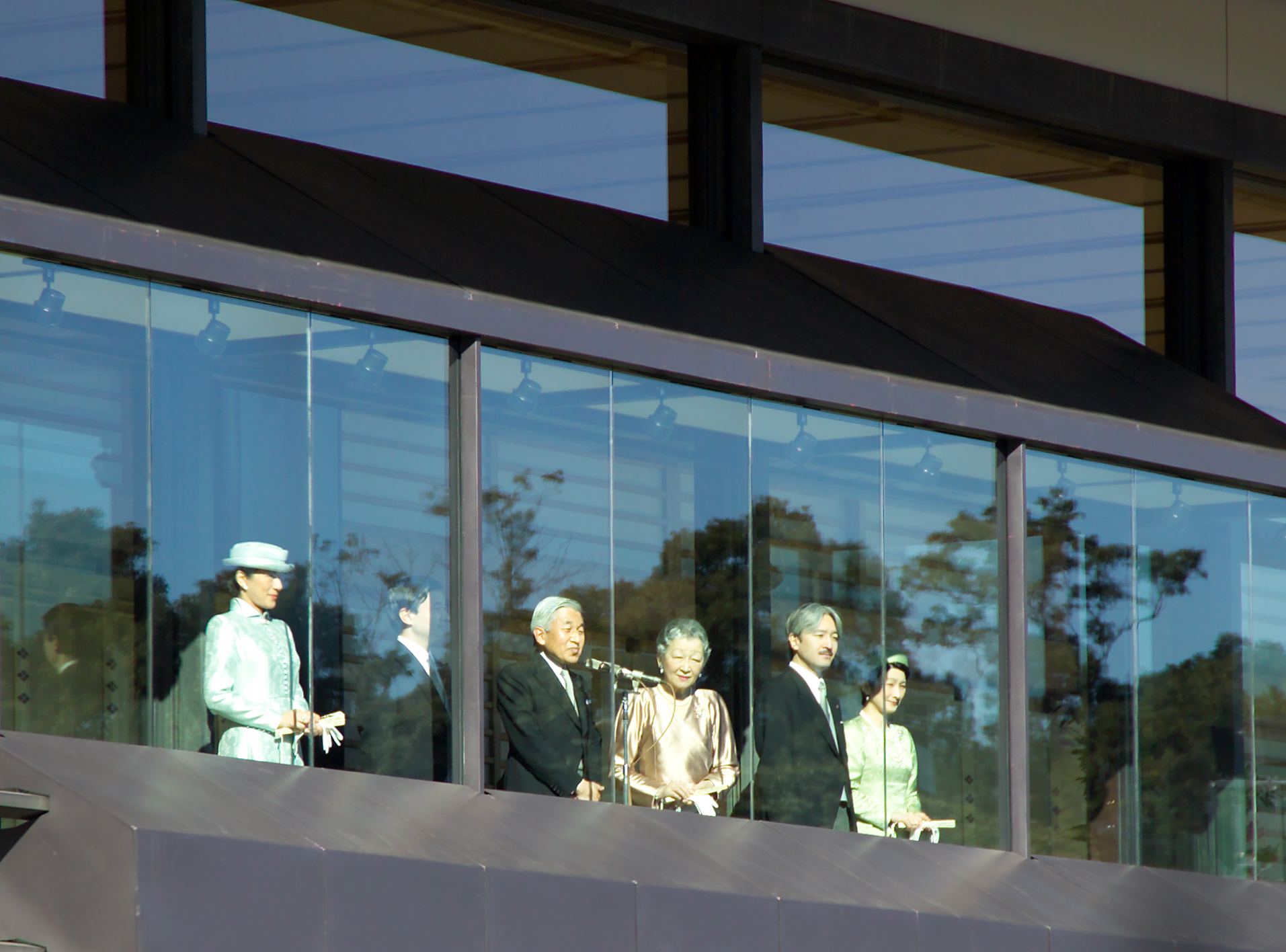
The Imperial family on the birthday of Emperor Akihito, 2005

Many citizens write letters to the emperor during the week leading up to his birthday, and display the Japanese flag on the day.

On the Emperor's Birthday, a public ceremony takes place at the Tokyo Imperial Palace, where the gates are opened (the palace is usually off-limits to the public). Usually only the surrounding park can be visited. The emperor, accompanied by the empress, and several other members of the imperial family appear on a palace balcony to acknowledge the birthday greetings of well-wishers waving Japanese flags. This event is called Ippan-sanga (一般参賀, Visit of the General Public to the Palace). Only on this occasion, and during New Year's celebrations on 2 January, are members of the public permitted to enter the inner grounds of the palace. The crowd must wait in an orderly manner in a pre-established area between the main road and the building: at a later time the police accompany visitors, guiding them from the square in front of them to the inside of the building. Admission is free and those who wish are given a small Japanese flag. The area in front of the reception pavilion is called Chōwaden. Visitors wait in line next to the Nijubashi bridge, at around 9:30 in the morning the police make a first group of people cross the bridge and manage the entrance to the square below the balcony. At around 10:20 am, the emperor, accompanied by the empress, the heirs to the throne and their respective spouses, looks out on the balcony and the crowd below wishes the emperor long life by repeating the word "banzai" in chorus which means "ten thousand years" (for the emperor). On the day of the holiday, the Imperial Palace complex and the surrounding streets are guarded by police, which, according to tradition, hand out small flags of Japan at the gate for free. Citizens may also bring their own if they wish.

Once his thanks and public greetings are concluded, the crowd begins to wave flags and the Imperial Family retreats inside the palace. The ceremony lasts three minutes in all, after which the group of subjects is guided outside, and a second group is allowed to enter. This operation is repeated several times, so that as many citizens as possible can pay homage to the emperor. The same evening, national television broadcasts a special during which the emperor addresses a few words of thanks to the country.

The crowd that attends the ceremony usually consists of adults and elderly people. Among the crowd, there may also be groups of foreign tourists who organize palace visits and enjoy the event.

== Song ==
"The Emperor's Birthday (Tenchōsetsu)" (天長節) (lyrics Mayori Kurokawa, composer Yoshisa Oku) was enacted as "a holiday festival date song" in 1893 (Meiji 26).

These are the lyrics of the song:

今日の吉き日は 大君の	Kyō no yoki hi wa ōkimi no	Today's blessing day is His Majesty's
うまれたまひし 吉き日なり	Umare tamaishi yoki hi nari	Day of birth, truly a blessing day
今日の吉き日は みひかりの	Kyō no yoki hi wa mihikari no	Today's blessing day is when the glorious light
さし出たまひし 吉き日なり	Sashide tamaishi yoki hi nari	Shines in, truly a blessing day
ひかり遍き 君が代を	Hikari amaneki kimi ga yo o	Lights are all over your reign
いはへ諸人 もろともに	Iwae morobito morotomo ni	Let us subjects celebrate, as one
めぐみ遍き 君が代を	Megumi amaneki kimi ga yo o	Graces are all over your reign
いはへ諸人 もろともに	Iwae morobito morotomo ni	Let us subjects celebrate, as one

天長節 (Tenchōsetsu), The Emperor's Birthday, 1893

== List of emperors' birthdays ==
Era	Emperor	Years	Date
Meiji	Emperor Meiji	1868–1872	22nd of the Ninth month (Lunisolar calendar)
Meiji	Emperor Meiji	1873–1911	3 November
Taishō	Emperor Taishō	1912–1913	31 August (Note: this was Taishō's actual birthday)
Taishō	Emperor Taishō	1914–1926	31 October (Note: the date for the celebrations was changed as it fell during the summer holiday season)
Shōwa	Emperor Shōwa	1927–1988	29 April
Heisei	Emperor Akihito	1989–2018	23 December
Reiwa	Emperor Naruhito	2020–	23 February
