= Greenery Day =

Public holiday in Japan

- Official name: みどりの日 (Midori no Hi)
- Observed by: Japan
- Type: Public
- Significance: to commune with nature and to be thankful for blessings.
- Date: May 4
- Next time: 4 May 2026
- Frequency: Annual
- Related to: Golden Week (Japan), World Environment Day

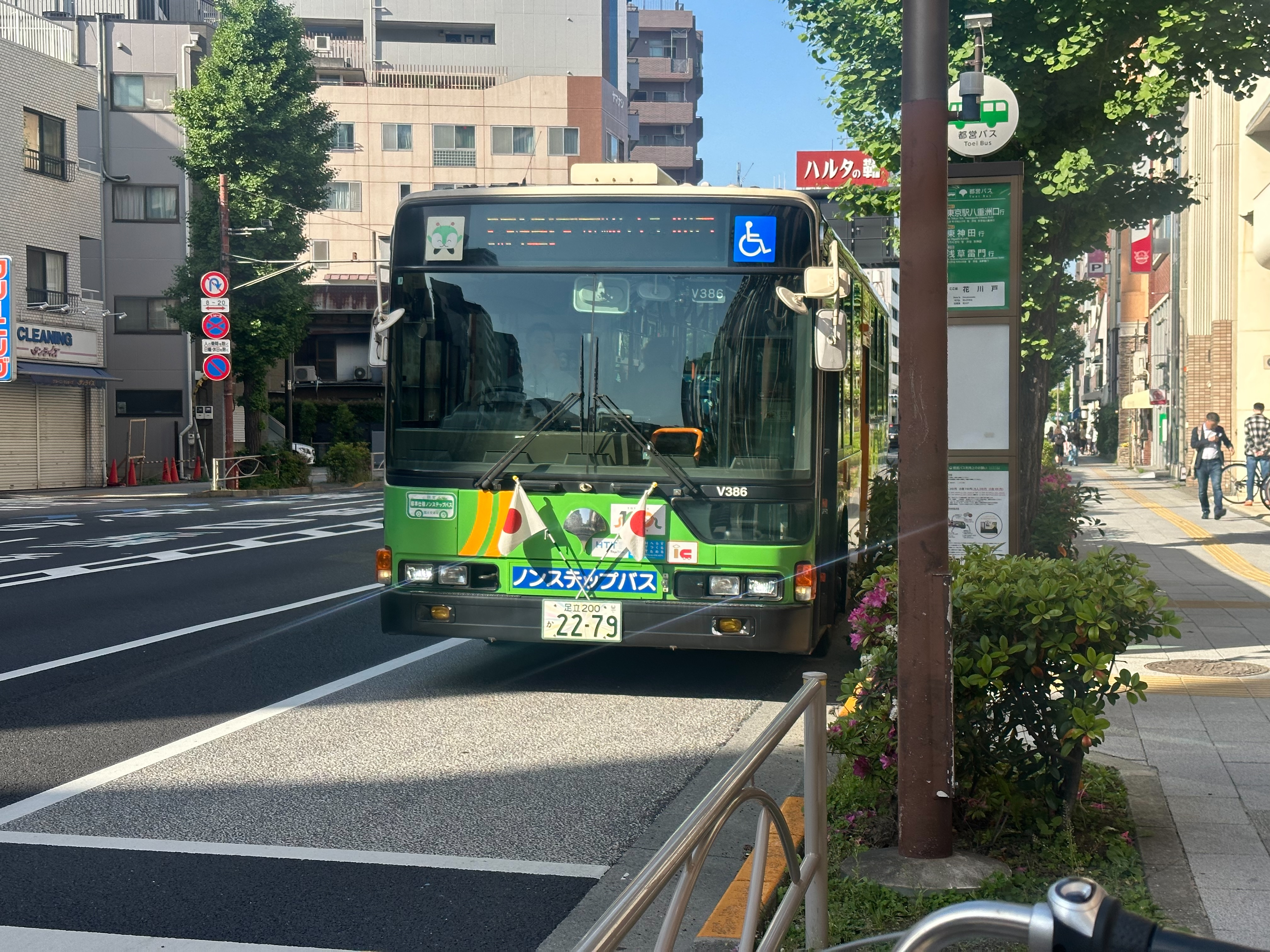
A bus decorated with two flags in celebration of Greenery Day, 2024

The present observation of Greenery Day (みどりの日, Midori no Hi) as a public holiday in Japan stems from the celebration of the birthday of the Emperor Shōwa (Hirohito, who lived from 1901 to 1989) on April 29 every year during the Shōwa era (1926–1989). In 1989, following the ascension of the Emperor Akihito to the Chrysanthemum Throne, the name of the holiday was changed from "Birthday of the Emperor" to "Greenery Day". Officially, as its name suggests, it is a day to commune with nature and to be thankful for blessings. The day was renamed to "Greenery Day" to acknowledge the controversial wartime emperor's love for plants without directly mentioning his name. However, in practice it is seen as just another day that expands the Japanese Golden Week vacation.

In 2007, Greenery Day moved to May 4, and April 29 was changed to Shōwa Day in accordance with a 2005 revision of the law pertaining to public holidays. The Showa Emperor reigned for 62 years and 2 weeks. On May 3, 1947, he became a symbol of Japan by the new constitution of the country.

Years	April 29	May 4
before 1988	The Emperor's Birthday	Non-holiday
1988	The Emperor's Birthday	National day of rest
1989–2006	Greenery Day	National day of rest
2007–	Showa Day	Greenery Day

== See also ==
- Golden Week (Japan)
- World Environment Day
