= Satsuki (name) =

- Pronunciation: [satsɯ̥ki]
- Gender: Unisex, predominantly female

Origin
- Origin: Japanese
- Meaning: Different depending on the kanji used
- Region of origin: Japan

Other names
- Related names: Yayoi

Satsuki is a traditional Japanese name for the month of May (五月). It is commonly used as a feminine given name and, more rarely, as a surname or a masculine name.

== Possible spellings ==
Satsuki can be spelled using different kanji characters and can mean:

Either as a given name or surname

- 五月, "May"
- 早月, "early moon/month"
- 皐月, "May; dwarf azalea"
- 皐, "shore of a wetland or paddy"

As a given name only

- 咲月, "blossom", "moon/month"
- 沙月, "sand", "moon/month"
- 幸希, "happiness", "rare/hope"

The given name can also be spelled in hiragana (さつき) or katakana (サツキ).

== People ==
Given name

- Satsuki (musician) (砂月), ex-member of the group Rentrer en Soi, now a solo artist
- Satsuki (サツキ) or 32ki, Japanese musician and Vocaloid producer, writer of the song "Mesmerizer"
- Satsuki Eda (五月), Japanese politician
- Satsuki Fujisawa (五月), Japanese curler
- Satsuki Igarashi (寒月), member of the all-female manga-creating team Clamp
- Satsuki Katayama (さつき), Japanese representative
- Satsuki Miura (紗津紀), Japanese professional footballer
- Satsuki Mori (颯樹), Japanese footballer
- Satsuki Muramoto (小月), Japanese figure skater
- Satsuki Nakayama (咲月), Japanese model and actor
- Satsuki Obata (さつき), Japanese gymnast
- Satsuki Odo (沙月), Japanese table tennis player
- Satsuki Totoro (さつき), Japanese professional wrestler
- Satsuki Yukino (五月), Japanese voice actress

Surname

- Ichirō Satsuki (五月一朗; 1919–2014), Japanese rōkyoku singer
- Keisuke Satsuki (皐月 啓左; born 1941), Japanese water polo player
- Midori Satsuki (五月), a Japanese actress

== Fictional characters ==
- Satsuki Kusakabe (サツキ), a main character of the 1988 animated film My Neighbor Totoro
- Satsuki Miyanoshita (さつき), a character in the 2000 anime Ghost Stories
- Satsuki, name of one of the doll agents in Street Fighter Alpha 3
- Satsuki Kitaouji (さつき), a character in the manga and anime series Strawberry 100% (Ichigo 100%)
- Satsuki Yotsuba (五月), a character in the manga and anime series Negima! Magister Negi Magi
- Satsuki Yumizuka (さつき), a character in the manga and anime series Tsukihime
- Satsuki Shinomiya, a character from the game series Uta no Prince-sama
- Satsuki, a character from the manga and anime series InuYasha
- Satsuki Yatouji (颯姫), a character from the manga and anime series X
- Satsuki Ichinose (皐), a character in the manga Nana
- Satsuki Iranami, character in the fangame dra serie based on danganronpa games
- Satsuki Shindō (咲月), a male character in the manga Shiawase Kissa Sanchoume
- Satsuki Shishio, a main character of Hirunaka no Ryūsei
- Satsuki Momoi (さつき), a character in the manga and anime series Kuroko's Basketball
- Satsuki Kiryuin (皐月), a main supporting character in the anime Kill la Kill
- Satsuki Hyoudou, a character in the manga and anime series Maid Sama!
- Satsuki Kururugi, a character in the video game and anime I-Chu

== See also ==
- Satsuki azalea, a cultivar group of azaleas
- Satsuki Shō, a Japanese domestic Grade 1 flat horse race
- Japanese destroyer Satsuki, two destroyers of Japan
- Japanese calendar
