= Poetic diction =

Poetic diction is the term used to refer to the linguistic style, the vocabulary, and the metaphors used in the writing of poetry. In the Western tradition, all these elements were thought of as properly different in poetry and prose up to the time of the Romantic revolution, when William Wordsworth challenged the distinction in his Romantic manifesto, the Preface to the second (1800) edition of Lyrical Ballads (1798). Wordsworth proposed that a "language near to the language of men" was as appropriate for poetry as it was for prose. This idea was very influential, though more in theory than practice: a special "poetic" vocabulary and mode of metaphor persisted in 19th century poetry. It was deplored by the Modernist poets of the 20th century, who again proposed that there is no such thing as a "prosaic" word unsuitable for poetry.

== Greece and Rome ==
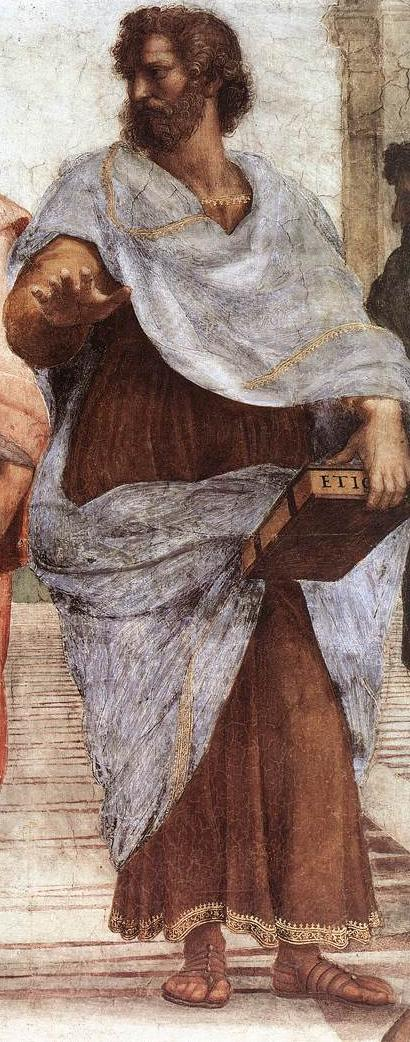
Aristotle: "A certain admixture... of unfamiliar terms is necessary".

In some languages, "poetic diction" is quite a literal dialect use. In Classical Greek literature, for example, certain linguistic dialects were seen as appropriate for certain types of poetry. Thus, tragedy and history would employ different Greek dialects. In Latin, poetic diction involved not only a vocabulary somewhat uncommon in everyday speech, but syntax and inflections rarely seen elsewhere. Thus, the diction employed by Horace and Ovid will differ from that used by Julius Caesar, both in terms of word choice and in terms of word form.

The first writer to discuss poetic diction in the Western tradition was Aristotle (384 BC—322 BC). In his Poetics, he stated that the perfect style for writing poetry was one that was clear without meanness. He went on to define meanness of style as the deliberate avoidance of unusual words. He also warned against over-reliance on strange words:

The perfection of Diction is for it to be at once clear and not mean. The clearest indeed is that made up of the ordinary words for things, but it is mean... A certain admixture, accordingly, of unfamiliar terms is necessary. These, the strange word, the metaphor, the ornamental equivalent, etc., will save the language from seeming mean and prosaic, while the ordinary words in it will secure the requisite clearness. What helps most, however, to render the Diction at once clear and non-prosaic is the use of the lengthened, curtailed, and altered forms of words. (Note: English translation by Ingram Bywater (1920).)

== Germanic languages ==
Germanic languages developed their own form of poetic diction. In Anglo-Saxon and Old Norse, poetry often involved exceptionally compressed metaphors called "kennings", such as whale-road for "the sea", or sword-weather for "battle". Also, poetry often contained riddles (e.g. the Gnomic Verses in Anglo-Saxon). Therefore, the order of words for poetry as well as the choice of words reflected a greater tendency to combine words to form metaphor.

In Iceland, Snorri Sturluson wrote the Prose Edda, a.k.a. the Younger Edda around 1200 A.D., partially to explain the older Edda and poetic diction. Half of the Prose Edda, the Skáldskaparmál ("language of poetry creation" or "creative language of poets"), is a manual of traditional Icelandic poetic diction, containing a list of kennings. The list is systematized so as to function as a practical thesaurus for the use of poets wishing to write in the genuine old manner, and structured as an FAQ. Snorri gives traditional examples and also opens the way for creating correct new kennings:

How should man be periphrased? By his works, by that which he gives or receives or does; he may also be periphrased in terms of his property, those things which he possesses, and, if he be liberal, of his liberality; likewise in terms of the families from which he descended, as well as of those which have sprung from him. How is one to periphrase him in terms of these things? Thus, by calling him accomplisher or performer of his goings or his conduct, of his battles or sea-voyages or huntings or weapons or ships.... Woman should be periphrased with reference to all female garments, gold and jewels, ale or wine or any other drink, or to that which she dispenses or gives; likewise with reference to ale-vessels, and to all those things which it becomes her to perform or to give. It is correct to periphrase her thus: by calling her giver or user of that of which she partakes. But the words for 'giver' and 'user' are also names of trees; therefore woman is called in metaphorical speech by all feminine tree-names. (Note: English translation by Arthur Gilchrist Brodeur (1916).)

In Britain the distinctively Germanic spirit of Anglo Saxon prosody placed particular emphasis on elaborate, decorative and controlled use of strongly ornate language, such as in consistent and sustained alliteration, as exemplified by the anonymous Pearl Poet of North-West England. In Scotland this spirit continued through to the renaissance so that in Middle Scots diction the 15th and 16th century Makars achieved a rich and varied blend of characteristically Germanic Anglic features with newer Latinate and aureate language and principles.

== Asia ==
In Japanese poetry, the rules for writing traditional haiku require that each poem include a reference to a specific season. For the renga linked-verse form from which haiku derived, the rules specify that certain stanzas should have seasonal references. In both cases, such references are achieved by inclusion of a kigo (season word). Japanese poets regularly use a Saijiki, a kigo dictionary that contains lists of season words, organized by season, together with examples of haiku using those kigo.

== In English ==
In English, poetic diction has taken multiple forms, but it generally mirrors the habits of Classical literature. Highly metaphoric adjective use, for example, can, through catachresis, become a common "poetic" word (e.g. the "rosy-fingered dawn" found in Homer, when translated into English, allows the "rose fingered" to be taken from its Homeric context and used generally to refer not to fingers, but to a person as being dawn-like). In the 16th century, Edmund Spenser (and, later, others) sought to find an appropriate language for the Epic in English, a language that would be as separate from commonplace English as Homeric Greek was from koine. Spenser found it in the intentional use of archaisms. (This approach was rejected by John Milton, who sought to make his epic out of blank verse, feeling that common language in blank verse was more majestic than difficult words in complex rhymes.) William Wordsworth also believed in using the language of the common man to portray a certain image and display his message. In the Preface to the Lyrical Ballads, Wordsworth says "I have proposed to myself to imitate, and as far as possible, to adopt, the very language of men."

In the 18th century, pastoral and lyric poetry both developed a somewhat specialized vocabulary and poetic diction. The common elision within words ("howe'er" and "howsome," e.g.) were not merely graphical. As Paul Fussell and others have pointed out, these elisions were intended to be read aloud exactly as printed. Therefore, these elisions effectively created words that existed only in poetry. Further, the 18th century saw a renewed interest in Classical poetry, and thus poets began to test language for decorum. A word in a poem needed to be not merely accurate, but also fitting for the given poetic form. Pastoral, lyric, and philosophical poetry was scrutinized for the right type of vocabulary as well as the most meaningful. Joseph Addison and Richard Steele discussed poetic diction in The Spectator, and Alexander Pope satirized inappropriate poetic diction in his 1727 Peri Bathos.

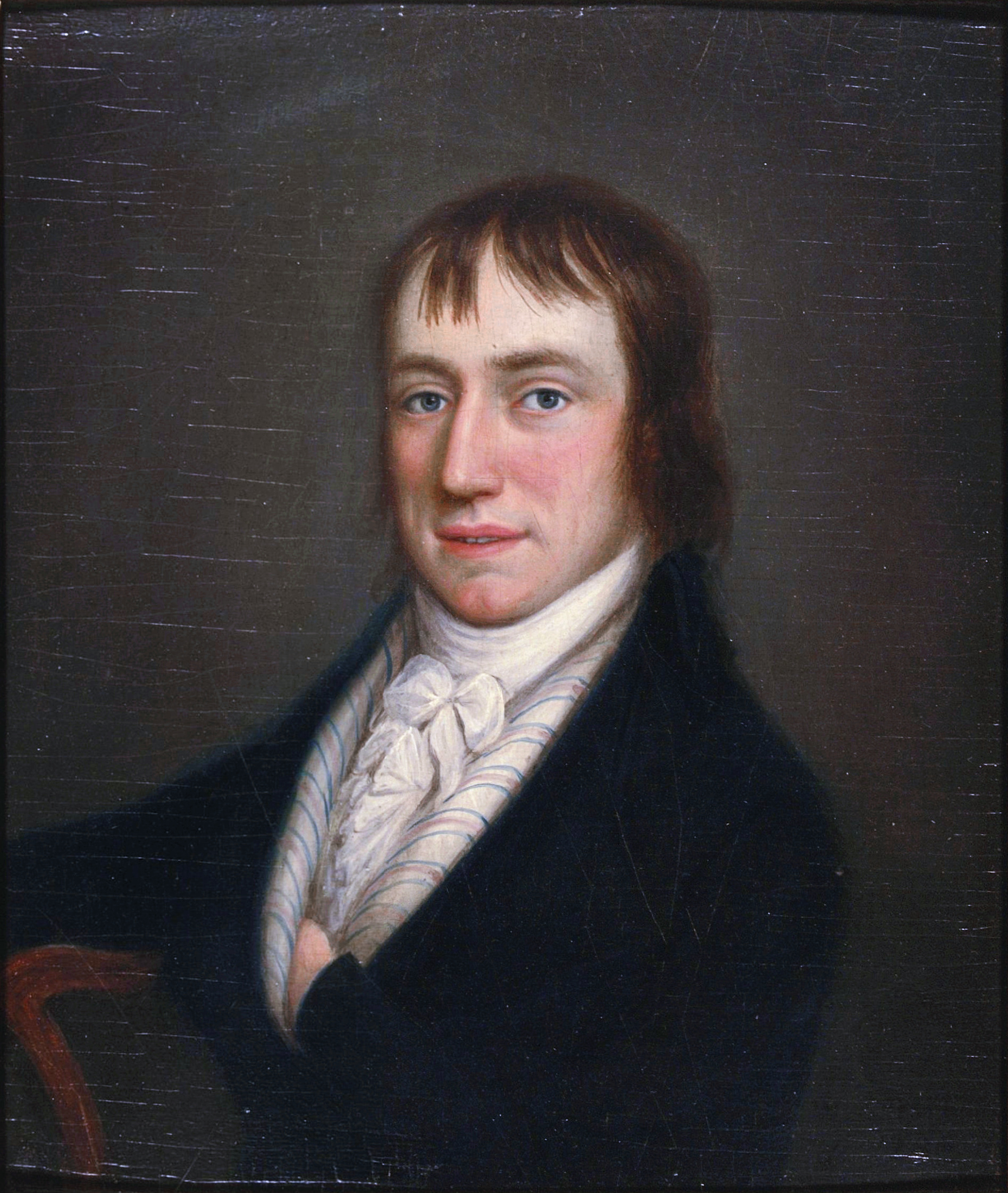
William Wordsworth: "There will also be found in these volumes little of what is usually called poetic diction".

The Romantics explicitly rejected the use of poetic diction, a term which William Wordsworth uses pejoratively in the 1802 "Preface to Lyrical Ballads":

There will also be found in these volumes little of what is usually called poetic diction; I have taken as much pains to avoid it as others ordinarily take to produce it; this I have done for the reason already alleged, to bring my language near to the language of men, and further, because the pleasure which I have proposed to myself to impart is of a kind very different from that which is supposed by many persons to be the proper object of poetry.

In an appendix, "By what is usually called poetic diction", Wordsworth goes on to define the poetic diction he rejects as above all characterized by heightened and unusual words and especially by "a mechanical adoption of... figures of speech, ... sometimes with propriety, but much more frequently applied... to feelings and ideas with which they had no natural connection whatsoever". The reason that a special poetic diction remote from prose usage gives pleasure to readers, suggests Wordsworth, is "its influence in impressing a notion of the peculiarity and exaltation of the Poet's character, and in flattering the Reader's self-love by bringing him nearer to a sympathy with that character." As an extreme example of the mechanical use of conventionally "poetic" metaphors, Wordsworth quotes an 18th-century metrical paraphrase of a passage from the Old Testament:

How long, shall sloth usurp thy useless hours,
Unnerve thy vigour, and enchain thy powers?
While artful shades thy downy couch enclose,
And soft solicitation courts repose,
Amidst the drowsy charms of dull delight,
Year chases year with unremitted flight,
Till want now following, fraudulent and slow,
Shall spring to seize thee, like an ambushed foe. (Note: Wordsworth wrongly attributes the passage to Samuel Johnson; it is actually by Anna Williams (1706–1783), from her Miscellanies in Prose and Verse, 1766.)

"From this hubbub of words", comments Wordsworth, "pass to the original... 'How long wilt thou sleep, O Sluggard? when wilt thou arise out of thy sleep? Yet a little sleep, a little slumber, a little folding of the hands to sleep. So shall thy poverty come as one that travaileth, and thy want as an armed man.'" (Proverbs, vii, 6)

At the same time, Wordsworth with Coleridge had an interest in the archaisms found in the border regions of England and introduced dialect into their poetry. While such language was "unnatural" to the London readership, Wordsworth was careful to point out that he was using it not for an exotic or elevated effect, but as a sample of the contemporary "language of men", specifically the language of poor, uneducated country folk. On the other hand, the later Romantic poet John Keats had a new interest in the poetry of Spenser and in the "ancient English" bards, and so his language was often quite elevated and archaic.

Modernism, on the other hand, rejected specialized poetic diction altogether and without reservation. Ezra Pound, in his Imagist essay/manifesto A Few Don'ts (1913) warned against using superfluous words, especially adjectives (compare the use of adjectives in the 18th-century poem quoted above) and also advised the avoidance of abstractions, stating his belief that 'the natural object is always the adequate symbol'. Since the Modernists, poetry has approached all words as inherently interesting, and some schools of poetry after the Modernists (Minimalism and Plain language, in particular) have insisted on making diction itself the subject of poetry.
