= List of kigo =

This is a list of kigo, which are words or phrases that are associated with a particular season in Japanese poetry. They provide an economy of expression that is especially valuable in the very short haiku, as well as the longer linked-verse forms renku and renga, to indicate the season referenced in the poem or stanza.

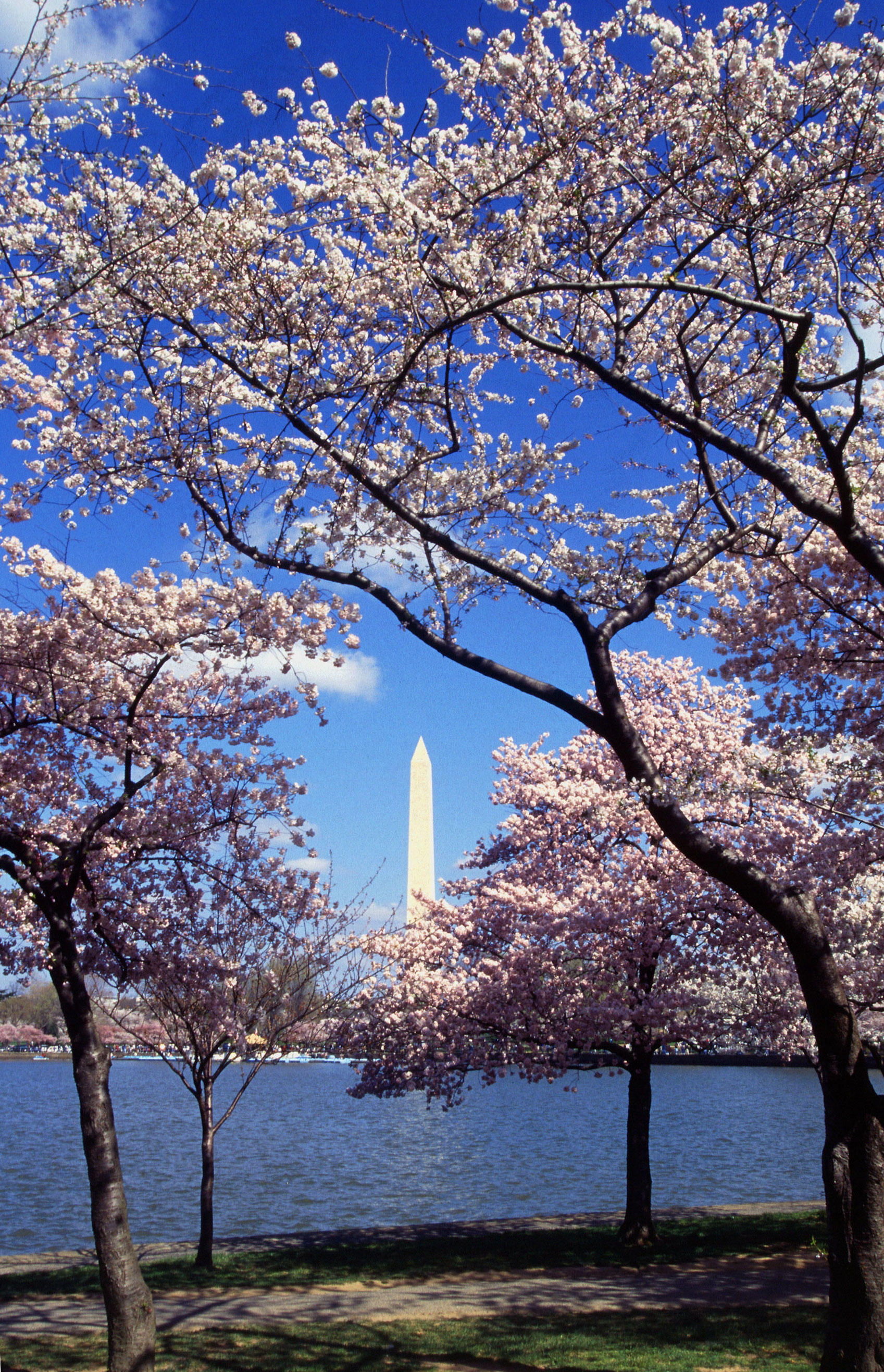
Cherry trees from Japan around the Tidal Basin in Washington, D.C.

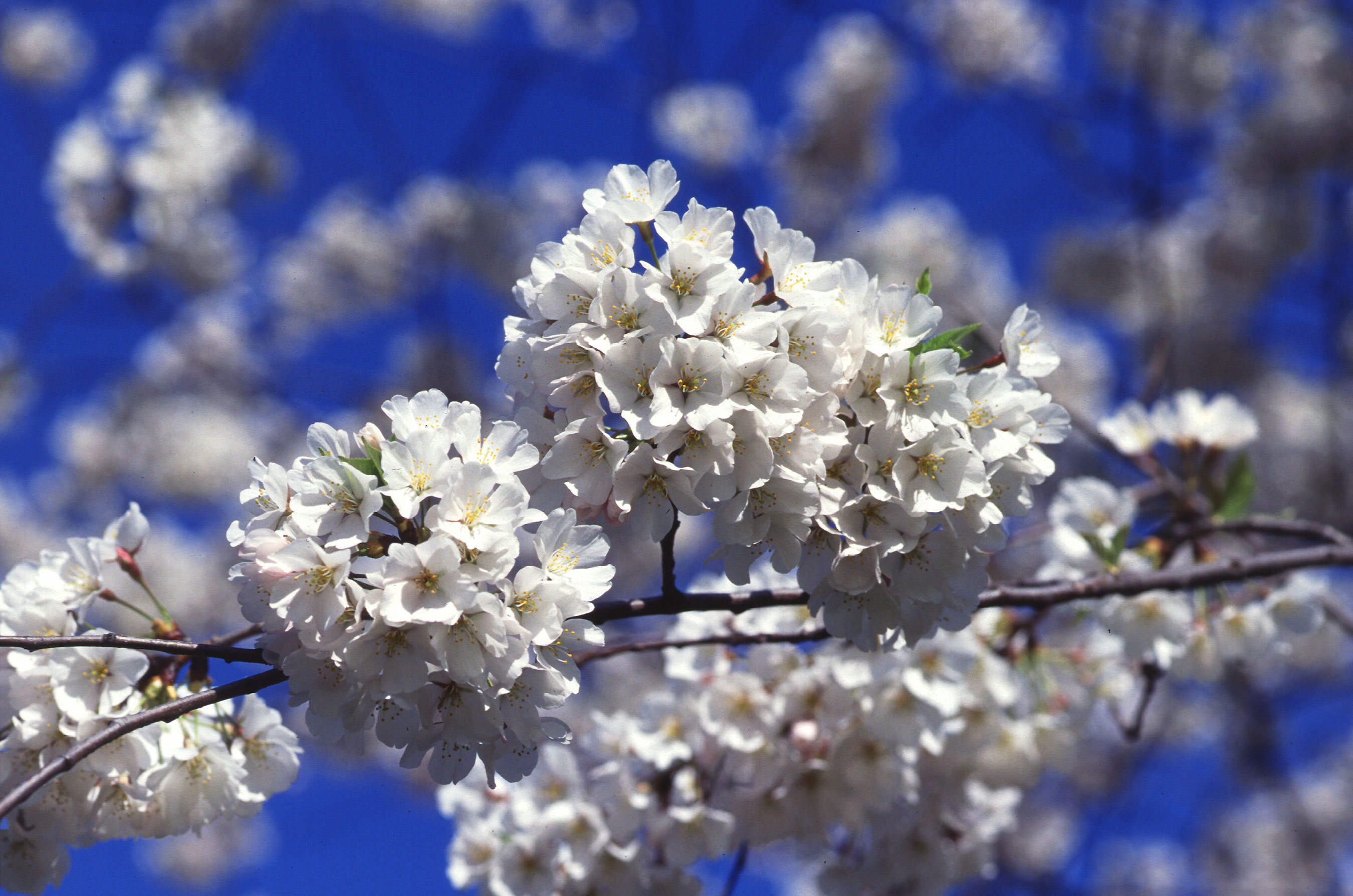
Cherry blossoms (sakura), often simply called blossoms (hana) are a common spring kigo.

== Japanese seasons ==
Until 1872, in the Japanese calendar, seasons traditionally followed the lunisolar calendar with the solstices and equinoxes at the middle of a season. The traditional and contemporary months are approximately one month apart from each other, with the traditional New Year falling between late January and early February. The traditional Japanese seasons are:

Spring: 4 February – 5 May
Summer: 6 May – 7 August
Autumn: 8 August – 6 November
Winter: 7 November – 3 February

For kigo, each season is then divided into early (初), mid- (仲), and late (晩) periods. For spring, these would be:

Early spring: 4 February – 5 March (February・First lunar month)
Mid-spring: 6 March – 4 April (March・Second lunar month)
Late spring: 5 April – 5 May (April・Third lunar month)
People have lots of special occasions and these are usually one of the most important.

== Saijiki and kiyose ==
Japanese haiku poets often use a saijiki, a book like a dictionary or almanac for kigo. An entry in a saijiki usually includes a description of the kigo itself, as well as a list of similar or related words, and a few examples of haiku that include that kigo. A kiyose is similar, but contains only lists of kigo. Modern saijiki and kiyose are divided into the four seasons and New Year, with some containing a further section for seasonless (muki) topics. Each section is divided into a standard set of categories, each containing the relevant kigo. The most common categories are:

- The season (時候 jikō)
- The sky and heavens (天文 tenmon)
- The earth (地理 chiri)
- Humanity (生活 seikatsu)
- Observances (行事 gyōji)
- Animals (動物 dōbutsu)
- Plants (植物 shokubutsu)

This is a list of both Japanese and non-Japanese kigo. If the kigo is a Japanese word, or if there is a Japanese translation in parentheses next to the English kigo, then the kigo can be found in most major Japanese saijiki.

[note: An asterisk (*) after the Japanese name for the kigo denotes an external link to a saijiki entry for the kigo with example haiku that is part of the "Japanese haiku: a topical dictionary" website.]

== Spring: 4 February – 5 May ==
=== The season ===
==== all spring ====
- spring (春 haru)
- warmth (暖かし atatakashi or 温み nukumi)

==== early spring (February・First lunar month) ====
- Mutsuki (睦月 lit. "month of affection") – First lunar month (present-day January)
- February (二月 nigatsu) – when using the solar calendar
- first day of spring (立春 risshun) – First solar term; approx. 4 February
- usui (雨水 lit. "rain water") – Second solar term; approx. 19 February
- signs of spring (春めく haru meku)
- shunkan (春寒) – cold weather in early spring

==== mid-spring (March・Second lunar month) ====
- Kisaragi (如月 lit. "like the moon" or 衣更着 lit. "wearing more clothes") – Second lunar month (present-day February)
- March (三月 sangatsu) – when using the solar calendar
- keichitsu (啓蟄) – Third solar term; approx 6 March. Literally translated "awakening hibernating insects", when insects come out of the ground, believed to occur on the first day of the lunar month.
- shunbun (春分) – Fourth solar term; approx. 20 March. Vernal equinox
- higan (彼岸 higan)

==== late spring (April・Third lunar month) ====
- Yayoi (弥生 lit. "increasing life") – Third lunar month (present-day March)
- April (四月 shigatsu) – when using the solar calendar
- seimei (清明 lit. "clear and bright") – Fifth solar term; approx. 5 April
- kokū (穀雨 lit. "grain rain") – Sixth solar term; approx. 20 April
- hanabie (花冷え lit "flowers becoming cold") – chilly spring weather
- fading of spring (行く春 Yuku haru)

=== The sky and heavens ===
==== all spring ====
- spring mist or haze (霞 kasumi)
- hazy moon (朧月 oborozuki) – 朧 oboro is a type of mist that obscures the moon; kanji composed of radicals for "moon" (月) and "dragon" (龍)
- awayuki (淡雪) – light snowfall
- shunjin (春塵) – frost and snow blown into the air by the spring wind

==== early spring (February・First lunar month) ====
- kaiyose (貝寄風 lit. "shell-gathering wind") – west wind that blows seashells ashore; traditionally believed to occur on the night of the vernal equinox

==== mid-spring (March・Second lunar month) ====
- haruichiban (春一番) – the first strong southerly wind of the spring

==== late spring (April・Third lunar month) ====
- wasurejimo (忘れ霜 lit. "forgotten frost") – late frost

=== The earth ===
==== all spring ====
- shunchō (春潮) – pleasant tides of spring
- yamawarau (山笑う lit. "laughing mountain") – a mountain covered in flower buds
- haru no umi (春の海) – calm sea of spring

==== early spring (February・First lunar month) ====
- usugōri or hakuhyō (薄氷) – thin ice

==== mid-spring (March・Second lunar month) ====
- mizu nurumu (水温む) – warming of water (in spring)
- yukima (雪間) – patch of ground without snow

==== late spring (April・Third lunar month) ====
- naeshiro or nawashiro (苗代) – seedbed

=== Humanity ===
- Spring depression (春愁 shunshū) – all spring
- Sowing (種蒔 tanemaki)

=== Observances ===
- Hanamatsuri (花祭り "Blossom Festival"), Buddhist festival celebrating the birth of Buddha, on 8 April.
- Hinamatsuri (雛祭 "Girl's Day", lit. "Doll Festival") – a traditional Japanese festival for girls on 3 March.

=== Animals ===
- frogs (蛙 kawazu) – all spring – noted for their loud singing
- skylarks (雲雀 hibari) – all spring – noted for their songs in flight
- swallows (燕 tsubame) – mid-spring
- twittering (囀り saezuri) – all spring – the chirping of songbirds
- Japanese bush warbler (鶯 uguisu (sometimes translated as Japanese nightingale), Cettia diphone) – early spring – the bird is used as an example of sweet sounds. Uguisu were mentioned in the preface to the Kokin Wakashū. It is often associated with ume blossoms and new growth in early Japanese waka and is regarded as a harbinger of spring (春告鳥 harutsugedori, lit. "bird which announces the arrival of Spring").

=== Plants ===
- plum blossom (梅 ume) – early spring
- cherry blossoms (桜 sakura) and cherry blossom-viewing (花見 hanami) – late spring (April) – for the Japanese, cherry blossoms are such a common topic that in just mentioning blossoms (hana) in haiku it is assumed they are cherry blossoms. Hanami is an occasion for partying with friends or coworkers.
- willow (柳 yanagi) – mid-spring
- wisteria (藤 fuji) – late spring

== Summer: 6 May – 7 August ==
=== The season ===
- dog days
- midsummer (夏至祭 geshimatsuri)
- summer (夏 natsu); other combinations are to become like summer (夏めく natsu meku), end of summer (夏の果て natsu no hate). summer holidays (夏休み natsu yasumi) primarily refers to the school holiday.
- May (皐月 satsuki or 五月 gogatsu), June (水無月 minazuki or 六月 rokugatsu), July (文月 fumizuki, fuzuki or 七月 shichigatsu)
- hot (暑し atsushi), hotness (暑さ atsusa) and hot day (暑き日 atsuki hi); also, anything related to the heat, including sweat (汗 ase) and in contemporary haiku, air conditioning (冷房 reibō)

=== The sky and heavens ===
- rainbow (虹 niji)
- Rainy season (梅雨 tsuyu) – the Japanese rainy season, usually starting in mid-June
- sea of clouds (雲海 unkai) – late summer
- kiu (喜雨) – late summer – lit. "pleasure rain"; rain that falls after hot and dry weather
- south wind (南風 minami)

=== The earth ===
- shitatari (滴り) – "dripping", referring to water trickling off rocks, moss, etc.
- waterfall (滝 taki)

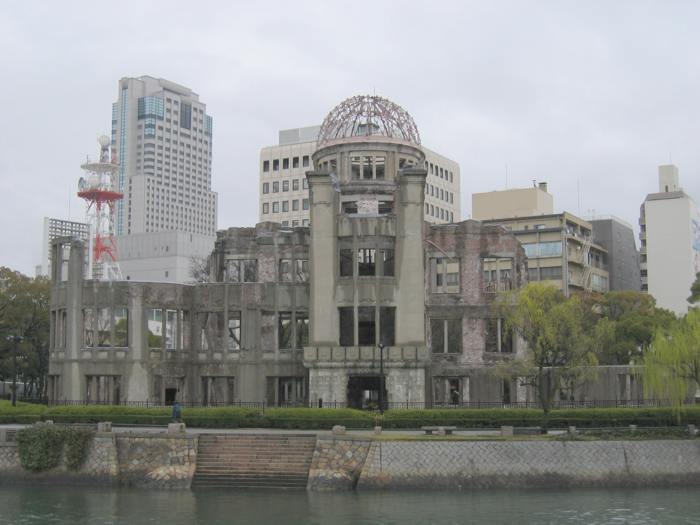
the A-Bomb dome in Hiroshima, near to the ground zero but the construction survived.

=== Humanity ===
- nap or siesta (昼寝 hirune)
- nudity (裸 hadaka)
- summer sports: surfing, beach volleyball, rollerblading and skateboarding
- sushi (寿司, 鮓, 鮨)
- jinbei (甚平) – traditional informal summer clothes
- swimming pool (プール pūru)

=== Observances ===
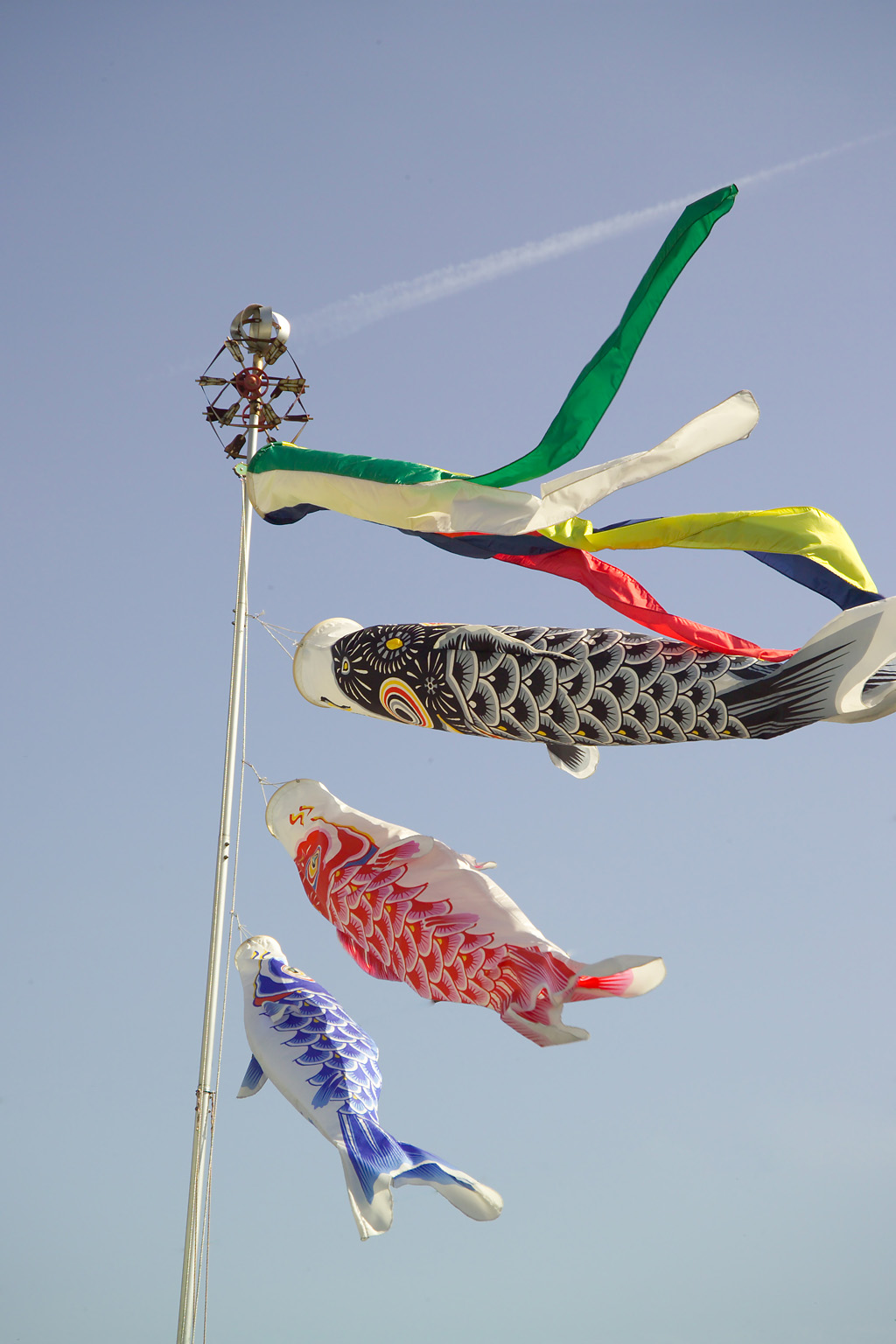
koinobori – ornament of Tango no sekku. Early summer.

- A-Bomb Anniversary (6 August) (原爆忌 genbakuki) – Either summer or autumn due to the proximinity between traditional and modern calendars
- Tango no sekku (端午の節句) – traditional festival for boys on 5 May (See Hinamatsuri in spring for the girls' festival).
- Festival (祭 matsuri) is applied to summer festivals of Shinto for purification. Traditionally, it referred to the festival of Kamo Shrine in Kyoto, however as kigo it can be applied to all local Shinto festivals.

=== Animals ===
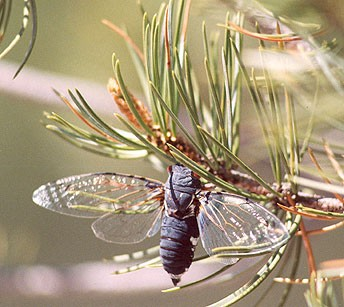
The cicada (semi) is a common late summer kigo.

- cicada (蝉 semi) – late summer – known for their cries
- lesser cuckoo (時鳥 hototogisu) – all summer – a bird in the cuckoo family noted for its song
- jellyfish (海月 kurage, lit. "sea moon")
- mosquito (蚊 ka)
- snake (蛇 hebi)

=== Plants ===
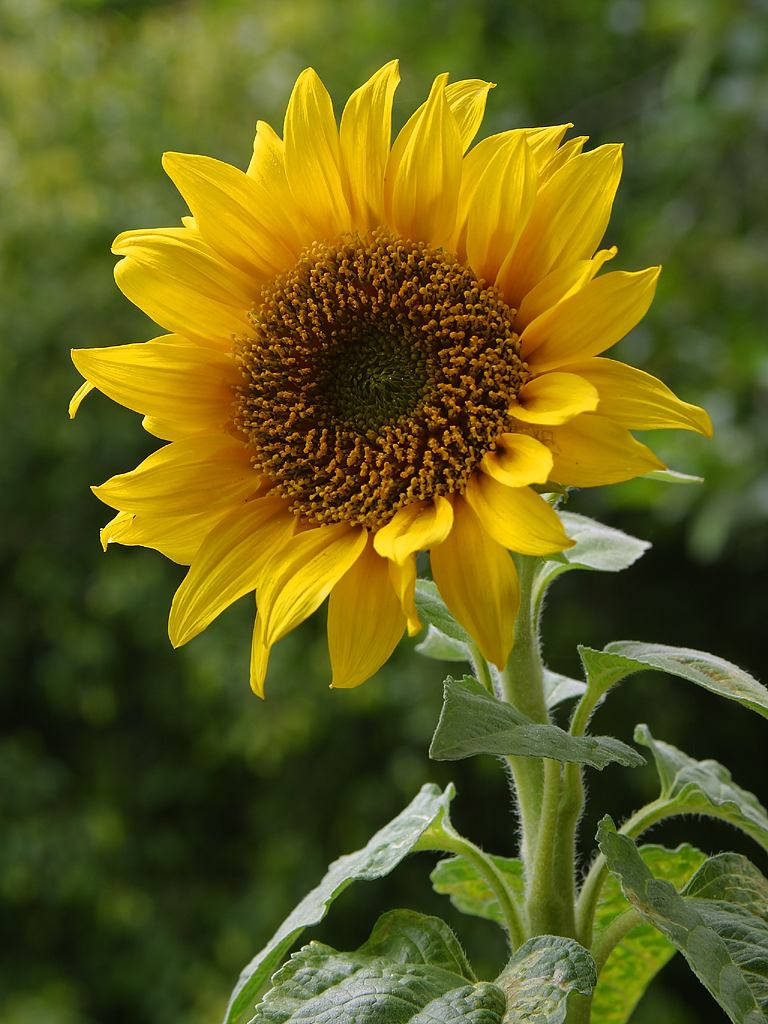
A sunflower, a typical sign of summer.

- lily (百合 yuri)
- lotus flower (蓮 hasu or hachisu)
- orange blossoms (蜜柑 mikan)
- sunflower (向日葵 himawari)
- tachibana orange (橘 tachibana)
- iris (菖蒲 ayame, shōbu or sōbu) – early summer (May)
- water lily (睡蓮 suiren) – mid and late summer.

== Autumn: 8 August – 6 November ==
=== The season ===
- autumn (秋 aki); other combinations are autumn has come (秋来ぬ aki kinu), autumn is ending (秋果つ aki hatsu), autumn being gone (行く秋 yuku aki).
- August (葉月 hazuki or 八月 hachigatsu), September (長月 nagatsuki or 九月 kugatsu) and October (神無月 kannazuki or 十月 jūgatsu)
- end of September (九月尽 kugatsujin), end of autumn (秋の果て aki no hate).

=== The sky and heavens ===
- Milky Way (天の川 amanogawa, lit. "river of heaven") – most visible in Japan in autumn. It is also associated with Tanabata (七夕).
- moon (月 tsuki) – all autumn
- Tsukimi (月見 lit. "moon-viewing") – mid-autumn (September) – the word "moon" by itself is assumed to be a full moon in autumn. Moon-viewing
- typhoon (台風 taifū or 野分 nowaki)

=== The earth ===
- Field of flowers (花野 hanano)
- Shiranui (不知火)
- Harvested rice fields (刈田 karita)

=== Humanity ===
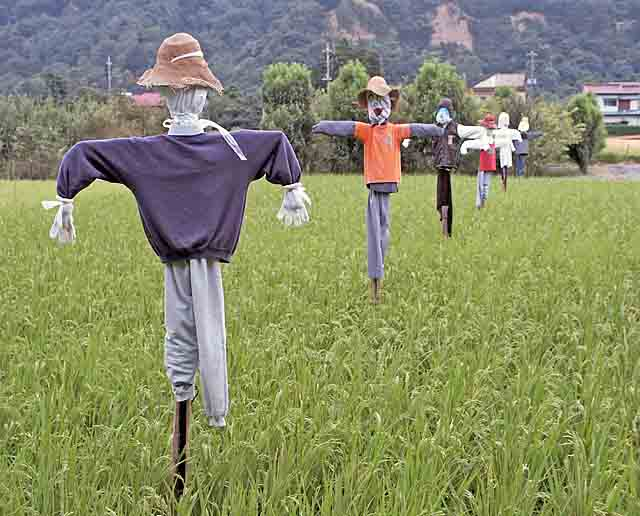
scarecrow in early autumn paddy field

- scarecrow (案山子 kakashi or 鳥威し toriodoshi)
- rice harvest (稲刈 inekari)
- Imonikai (芋煮会)
- leaf peeping (紅葉狩 momijigari) – a common group activity

=== Observances ===
- Tanabata (七夕) (the festival of the weaver maiden and the herdsman in the Heavenly Court)
- grave-visiting (墓参 haka mairi or bosan)
- Bon Festival (盆 bon)
- mukaebi (迎火) – bonfires welcoming the ancestors
- bon odori (盆踊).

The traditional date of Tanabata is 7th day of the 7th month of the Japanese calendar, which falls in early Autumn. The modern use of the Gregorian one has moved the observance to 7 July, which has resulted in a dispute as to whether Tanabata should be treated as a summer kigo.

=== Animals ===
- insects (虫 mushi), mainly it implies singing one.
- crickets (蟋蟀 kōrogi) – all autumn (August–October) – noted for the singing of the males.
- bell cricket (鈴虫 suzumushi)
- walker's cicada (法師蝉 hōshizemi lit. "Buddhist priest cicada")
- Deer (鹿 shika)

=== Plants ===
Grapes (葡萄 budō) are a fruit typically harvested in autumn

- nashi pear (梨 nashi)
- Chaenomeles (木瓜の実 boke no mi)
- peach (桃 momo)
- persimmon (柿 kaki)
- apples (林檎 ringo)
- grapes (葡萄 budō)
- colored leaves (椛momiji or 紅葉 kōyō) – late autumn (October) – a very common topic for haiku
- first colored leaves (初紅葉 hatsu-momiji or hatsu-momijiba) – mid-autumn
- shining leaves (照葉 teriha) – late autumn
- leaves turning color (薄紅葉 usumomiji) – mid-autumn
- leaves start to fall (紅葉かつ散る momiji katsu chiru) – late autumn

== Winter: 7 November – 3 February ==
=== The season ===
- winter (冬 fuyu), using "winter" in a haiku adds a sense of chilliness (literally and figuratively), bleakness, and seclusion to the poem.
- November (霜月 shimotsuki or 十一月 jūichigatsu), December (師走 shiwasu or 十二月 jūnigatsu) and January (睦月mutsuki or 一月 ichigatsu)
- cold (寒し samushi) and coldness (寒さ samusa)

=== The sky and heavens ===
- snow (雪 yuki)
- Indian summer (小春日和 koharubiyori lit. "small spring weather") – a period of unseasonable warmth, usually in late autumn to early winter
- frost-covered trees (樹氷 juhyō)
- north wind (北風 kitakaze or hokufū) – indicating the coming of cold weather
- shigure (時雨) – rain in late autumn or early winter

=== The earth ===
- yama-nemuru (山眠る) – lit. "sleeping mountain", evoking a sense of stillness in the mountains
- kitsunebi (狐火 lit. "fox fire") – a type of atmospheric ghost light mostly associated with winter
- winter landscape (冬景色 fuyugeshiki) – Evokes the sense of a "winter wonderland"

=== Humanity ===
- snow-viewing (雪見 yukimi) – late winter (January) – a popular group activity in Japan.
- fugu soup (河豚汁 fugujiru)
- Anglerfish hotpot (鮟鱇鍋 ankō nabe)
- calendar vendor (暦売 koyomiuri) – preparation for the new year.
- asazuke (浅漬) – lightly pickled vegetables
- breath vapor (息白し ikishiroshi)

=== Observances ===
- Christmas (クリスマス kurisumasu or 降誕祭 kōtansai) – this is a modern kigo and uncommon in the Edo period.
- New Year's Eve (大晦日 ōmisoka 年の夜 toshi no yo or 除夜 joya), and the New Year's Eve party (年忘 toshiwasure)
- Kan (寒 kan lit. "coldness") – days from 5–6 January until 4–5 February, originating from the Chinese 24 seasonal periods. Also daikan (lit. "great coldness") a period that begins around 20 January.

=== Animals ===
- crane (鶴 tsuru)
- swan (白鳥 hakuchō)
- badger (あなぐま anaguma)
- rabbit (兎 usagi)
- wolf (狼 ōkami)
- hibernation (冬眠 tōmin)
- whale watching (鯨見 kujirami) – the number of whales off the coast peak at different times of the year depending on the region. In Japan, whales are most often seen during the winter.
- oyster (牡蠣 kaki)
- waterfowl sleeping on water (浮寝鳥 ukinedori)

=== Plants ===
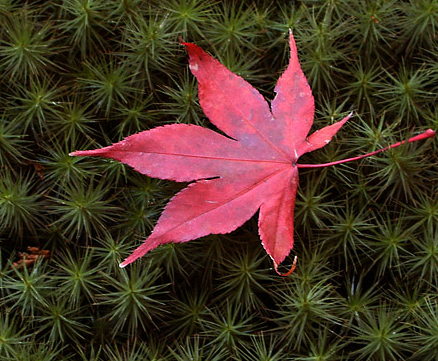
Fallen leaves (ochiba), a symbol of winter.

- winter chrysanthemum (冬菊 fuyugiku or 寒菊 kangiku)
- daffodil (水仙 suisen lit. "water immortal")
- ornamental kale (葉牡丹 habotan)
- false holly (柊 hiragi or hīragi)
- fallen leaves (落葉 ochiba)
- dry leaves (枯葉 kareha)

== New Year ==
As in many other cultures, the Japanese New Year is an important time of year for celebrations and there are many activities associated with it that may be mentioned in haiku. Before Japan began using the Gregorian calendar in 1873, the Japanese New Year was at the beginning of spring. Many of these terms reflect the traditional calendar system.

=== The season ===
- Japanese New Year (正月 shōgatsu) *
- New Year (新年 shinnen)
- New Year's Day (元日 ganjitsu or gannichi)
- New Year's Day (元旦 gantan) – refers to the dawn or morning of New Year's Day
- Old Year (旧年 kyūnen or furutoshi)
- Little New Year (小正月 koshōgatsu) – traditionally celebrated on the 15th day of the month during the full moon
- Women's New Year (女正月 onnashōgatsu) – same as above, referring to women who were too busy to celebrate the actual new year, especially in Osaka and Kyoto regions.

=== The sky and heavens ===
- First Day (初日 hatsuhi)
- First Sky (初空 hatsusora or hatsuzora) – the sky on New Year's morning
- first laughter (hatsuwarai or waraizome) – indicating good fortune
- Each day of first week of the new year is treated as kigo, such as the seventh day of the new year (七日 nanoka, lit. "the seventh day").

=== Humanity ===
- kadomatsu * (門松) – a traditional decoration usually made of pine and bamboo that is placed on the gate or outer doorway
- toshidama (年玉) – the custom of giving pocket money to children
- toso (屠蘇) – a ritual mulled sake only drunk on New Year's Day
- osechi (御節) – traditional Japanese New Year's Day food
- zōni (雑煮) * – a traditional vegetable broth with mochi
- Festival of Seven Herbs (七草の節句 Nanakusa no sekku) – a festival centered around eating seven-herb congee (七草粥 nanakusagayu)
- first writing (書初 kakizome) – the first calligraphy written around the New Year

=== Observances ===
- Namahage (生剥) – a ritualized folktale in Akita Prefecture
- Hatsumōde (初詣) – the first visit of the year to a Shinto shrine
- New Year's Sumo Tournament (初場所 hatsubasho)
- First Poetry Reading (歌会始 utakai-hajime)
- Ehōmairi (恵方詣) – visit to a shrine or temple that lies in an auspicious direction

=== Animals ===
- yomegakimi (嫁が君) – a euphemism for mouse, used for the first three days of the New Year
- first sparrow (初雀 hatsu-suzume) * – the first sparrow helps welcome the New Year
- first sound (初声 hatsukoe) – the first cry of an animal in the New Year
- first cockcrow (初鶏 hatsutori)
- Japanese spiny lobster (伊勢海老 ise-ebi)

=== Plants ===
- young greens (若菜 wakana)
- false daphne (楪 yuzuriha) – used in decoration
- henbit (仏の座 hotoke-no-za lit. "Buddha's seat") – one of the seven spring flowers (春の七草 haru-no-nanakusa)

== See also ==
- Haiku
- Haiku in English
- Culture of Japan
- Hokku
- Renku
- Renga
- Saijiki

=== Helpful lists of species ===
Birds

- Lists of birds by region
- List of Japanese birds: passerines
- List of Japanese birds: non-passerines

== Sources ==
- 『入門歳時記』大野林火監修、俳句文学館編。角川書店 、ISBN 4-04-063000-9. [Title: "Introductory Saijiki", editor: "Ōno Rinka", Publisher: Kadokawa Shoten ]
- Haiku World: An International Poetry Almanac by William J. Higginson, Kodansha International 1996 ISBN 4-7700-2090-2 (An international haiku saijiki with over 1,000 haiku and senryu from poets in 50 countries covering 680 seasonal topics)
- The Haiku Seasons: Poetry of the Natural World by William J. Higginson, Kodansha International © 1996 ISBN 4-7700-1629-8 (a companion book to Haiku World discussing the development of haiku, and the importance of the seasons and kigo to haiku)
- "Kigosai". きごさい歳時記 (in Japanese).
