= Yayoi (disambiguation) =

Yayoi is a pre-historical era in Japan.

Yayoi (month) is also the third month in the Japanese calendar

Yayoi can also refer to:

- Yayoi (given name), a Japanese female given name
- Yayoi Kusama, a Japanese artist and writer
- Yayoi people, an ancient ethnic group
- Yayoi, Ōita, a town in Japan
- Yayoi, Tokyo, an area of Tokyo
- Japanese destroyer Yayoi, two destroyers
- Yayoi Sho, a Japanese horse race
