= Saijiki =

List of seasonal terms used in haiku

A saijiki (歳時記; lit. "year-time chronicle") is a list of Japanese kigo (seasonal terms) used in haiku and related forms of poetry. An entry in a saijiki usually includes a description of the kigo itself, as well as a list of similar or related words, and some examples of haiku that include that kigo. A kiyose (季寄せ) is similar, but does not contain sample poems. Modern saijiki and kiyose are divided into the four seasons and New Year, with some containing a further section for seasonless (無季, muki) topics. Each seasonal section is further divided into a standard set of categories, each containing a list of relevant kigo. The most common categories are the season, the heavens, the earth, humanity, observances, animals and plants.

== Japanese seasons ==
In the Japanese calendar, seasons traditionally followed the lunisolar calendar with the solstices and equinoxes at the middle of a season. The traditional Japanese seasons are:

- Spring: 4 February–5 May
- Summer: 6 May–7 August
- Autumn: 8 August–6 November
- Winter: 7 November–3 February

In categorising kigo, a saijiki or kiyose divides each season into early, middle, and late periods, as follows:

- Early spring: 4 February–5 March
- Mid-spring: 6 March–4 April
- Late spring: 5 April–5 May
- Early summer: 6 May–5 June
- Mid-summer: 6 June–6 July
- Late summer: 7 July–7 August
- Early autumn: 8 August–7 September
- Mid-autumn: 8 September–7 October
- Late autumn: 8 October–6 November
- Early winter: 7 November–6 December
- Mid-winter: 7 December–4 January
- Late winter: 5 January–3 February

== See also ==
- Haiku in English
- List of kigo
- Renga, an older form of poetry employing kigo
- Renku, the poetic form from which haiku derived, also using kigo
- Saijiki (3776 album)

== Bibliography ==
=== English ===
- The Five Hundred Essential Japanese Season Words, selected by Kenkichi Yamamoto, on Renku Home
- William J. Higginson, ed. Haiku world: an international poetry almanac. Kodansha, 1996. ISBN 978-4-7700-2090-1
- The Japanese Haiku Topical Dictionary at the University of Virginia Japanese Text Initiative
- World Kigo Database, worldwide saijiki
- A Dictionary of Haiku Classified by Season Words with Traditional and Modern Methods, by Jane Reichhold, on AHA Poetry.

=== French ===
- LE SAIJIKI: Ephéméride poétique à l'usage des poètes composant des haïku en langue française (in French) - Le Saijiki, the French version of the Saijiki by Seegan Mabesoone, has been available since 1998.

=== Japanese ===
- Masaoka Shiki, ed. Kiyose. 1930 (Japanese: 正岡子規 編『季寄せ』（三省堂、1930）)
- Kyoshi Takahama, ed. A New Saijiki, 1934 (Japanese: 高浜虚子 編『新歳時記』（三省堂、1934）)
- Teiko Inahata, ed. The New Hototogisu Saijiki, 1996 (Japanese: 稲畑汀子 編『ホトトギス 新歳時記』（三省堂、1996）＆ CD版（1998）)
