= Kigo =

"Season word" used in Japanese poetry

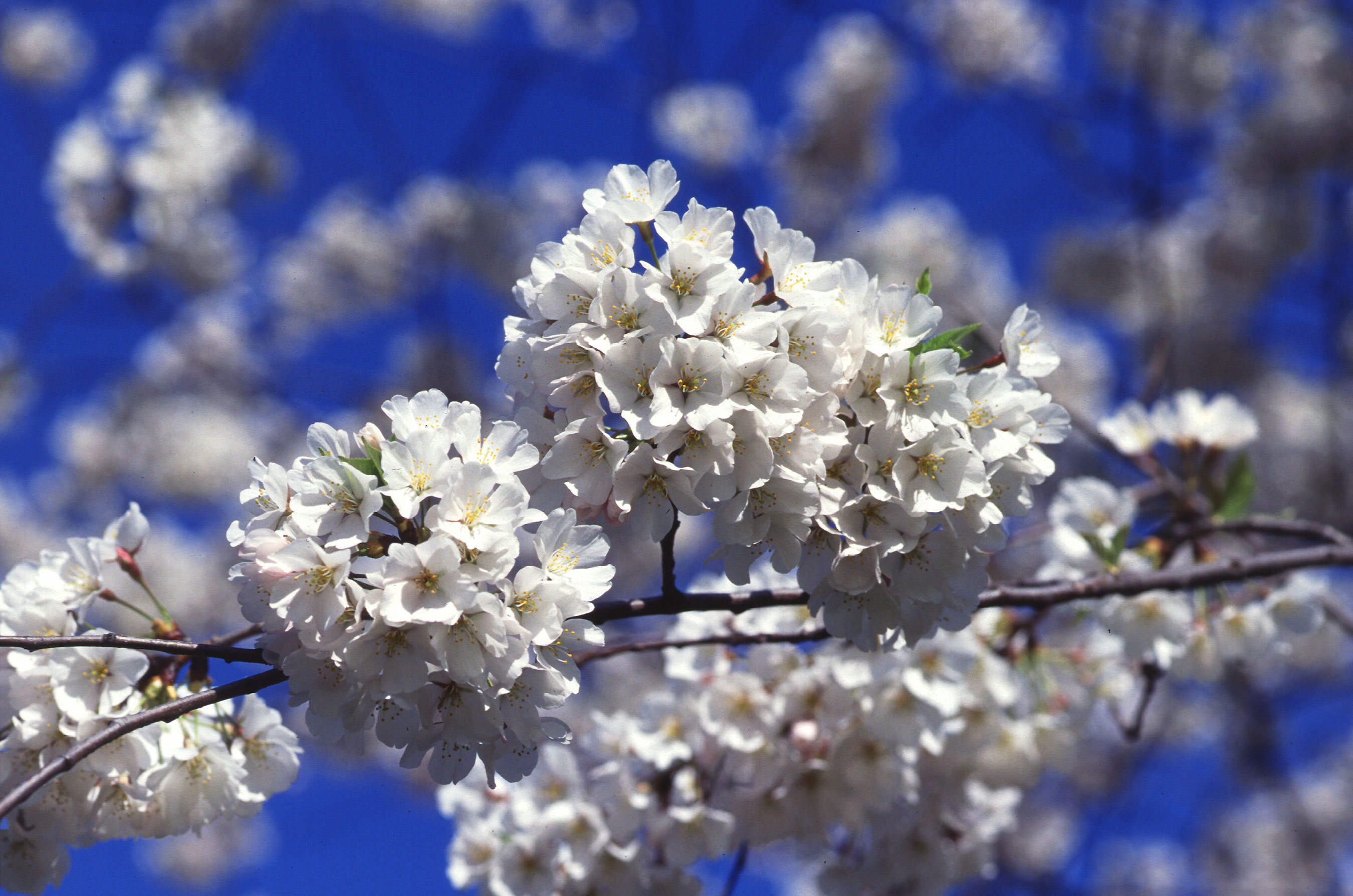
Cherry blossoms (sakura), often simply called blossoms (hanami) are a common spring kigo.

A kigo (季語; 'season word') is a word or phrase associated with a particular season, used in traditional forms of Japanese poetry. Kigo are used in the collaborative linked-verse forms renga and renku, as well as in haiku, to indicate the season referred to in the stanza. They are valuable in providing economy of expression.

== History ==
Representation of, and reference to, the seasons has long been important in Japanese culture and poetry. The earliest anthology of Japanese poetry, the mid-8th century Man'yōshū, contained several sections devoted to the seasons. By the time of the first imperial Japanese anthology, the Kokinshū a century and a half later (AD 905), the seasonal sections had become a much larger part of the anthology. Both of these anthologies had sections for other categories such as love poems and miscellaneous (zō) poems.

The writing of the linked-verse form renga dates to the middle of the Heian period (roughly AD 1000) and developed through the medieval era. Over time, set rules developed for the writing of renga, and its formal structure specified that about half of the stanzas should include a reference to a specific season, depending upon their place in the poem. According to these rules, the hokku (the opening stanza of the renga) must include a reference to the season in which the renga was written. Poets as early as Iio Sogi (1421-1502) introduced the concept of seasonal references with anthologies of seasonal topics.

A lighter form of renga called haikai no renga ("playful" linked verse) was introduced in the 16th century, and became a salon type recreation by the Tokugawa era. Poets soon began to compose hokku independent of the longer, collaborative renga and it began to become an independent style. In the early twentieth century poets began experimenting with breaking the traditional elements of haiku, such as omitting the kigo entirely. This eventually led to the New Haiku and free verse haiku movements, which advocated more modern styles of haiku. Today most Japanese haiku include a kigo, though many haiku written in languages other than Japanese omit it (see for example Haiku in English).

== Significance ==
Season words are evocative of images that are associated with the same time of year. For readers in New England, a poem about frost on a pumpkin evokes other sensations and traditions, like frosty air and apple cider. For Higginson writing in The Haiku Seasons, season words are a type of logopoeia--a word used not just for its meaning, but for its associations with other ideas.

== Seasons ==
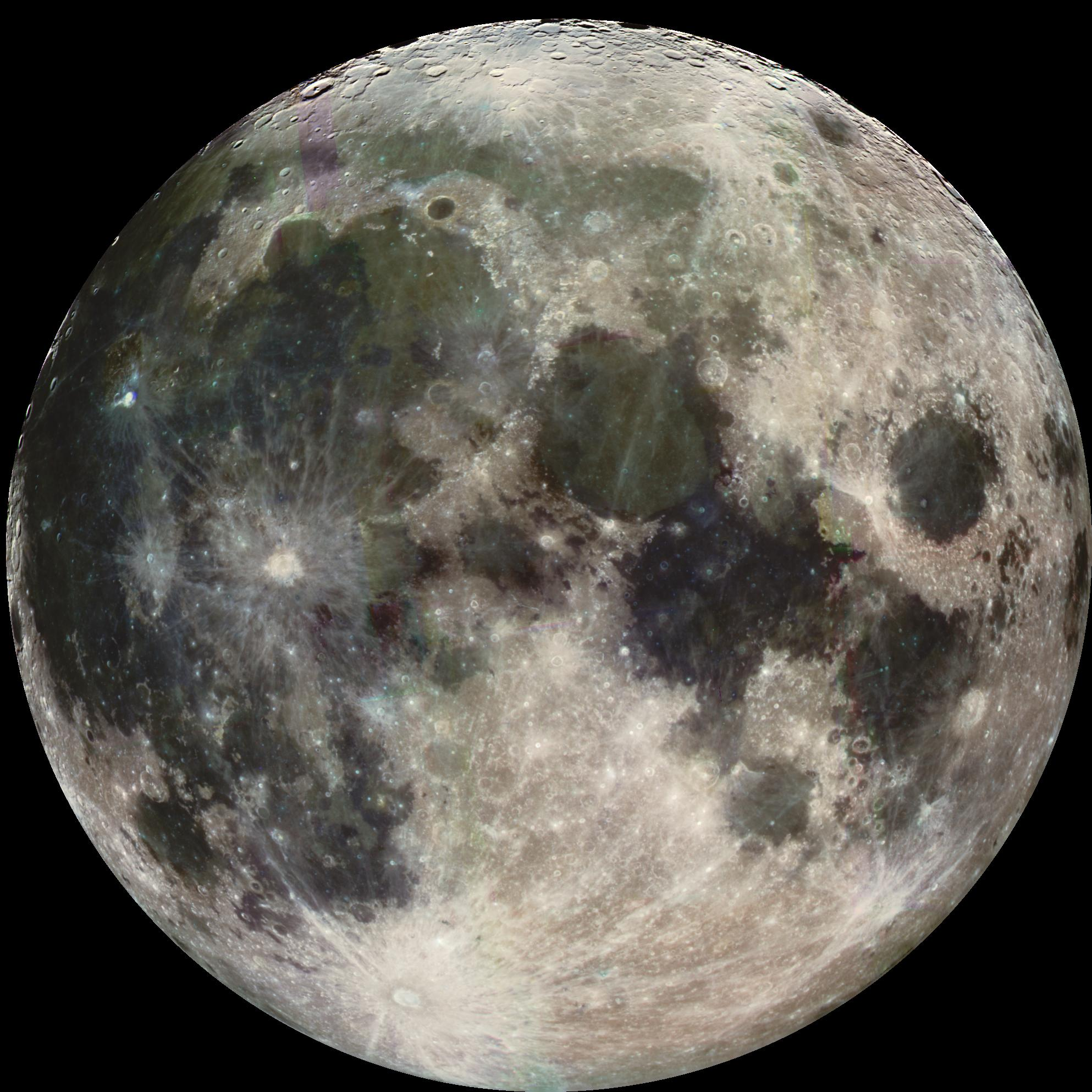
The moon is associated with autumn in Japanese poetry.

The association of kigo with a particular season may be obvious, though sometimes it is more subtle. In Japan, Pumpkins (kabocha) are a winter squash associated with the autumn harvest. It may be less obvious why the moon (tsuki) is an autumn kigo, since it is visible year round. In autumn the days become shorter and the nights longer, yet they are still warm enough to stay outside, so one is more likely to notice the moon. Often, the night sky will be free of clouds in autumn, with the moon visible. The full moon can help farmers work after the sun goes down to harvest their crops (a harvest moon).

=== Japanese seasons ===
Japan is long from north to south, so the seasonal features vary from place to place. The sense of season in kigo is based on the region between Kyoto and Tokyo, because Japanese classical literature developed mainly in this area. In the Japanese calendar, seasons traditionally followed the lunisolar calendar with the solstices and equinoxes at the middle of a season. The traditional Japanese seasons are:

- Spring: 4 February–5 May
- Summer: 6 May–7 August
- Autumn: 8 August–6 November
- Winter: 7 November–3 February

Within season categories, kigo can denote early, middle, or late parts of a season, which are defined approximately as the first, second, or third month of the season. In linked haiku forms like renku, subsequent linked haiku must move forward in season temporally. There are other rules governing season words in renku, including the frequency of certain season words, and how many stanzas remain in a season, once mentioned.

== Saijiki and lists of kigo ==
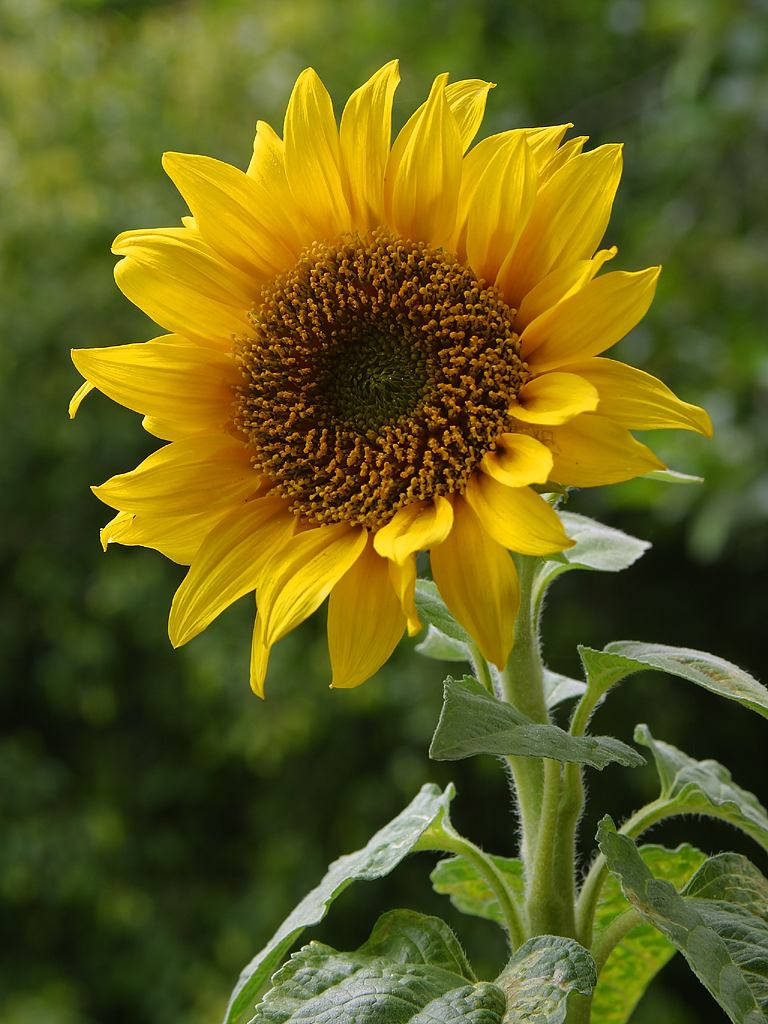
A sunflower, a typical summer kigo.

Japanese haiku poets often use a book called a saijiki, which lists kigo with example poems. An entry in a saijiki usually includes a description of the kigo itself, together with a list of similar or related words, and some examples of haiku that include that kigo. The saijiki are divided into the four seasons (and modern saijiki usually include a section for seasonless (muki) words). Those sections are divided into a standard set of categories, and then the kigo are sorted within their proper category. Japan Great Saikiji uses the sub-categories of season words, the heavens, earth, humanity, observances, animals, and plants.

Examples of Japanese summer kigo are:

Summer

- The Season: short night, burning, hot
- The Sky and Heavens: rainy season, evening downpour, afterglow, drought
- The Earth: waterfall, summer meadow, clear water
- Humanity: switching clothes, straw mats, swimming, fireworks
- Observances: Boys' Day (May 5), Gion festival (July)
- Animals: fawn, mosquito, cuckoo
- Plants: peony, lotus flower, orange blossoms, lily, sunflower

== Outside Japan ==
Haiku started as a form of Japanese poetry and is now written in many different languages around the world. William J. Higginson's Haiku World (1996), which is the first international saijiki, contains more than 1,000 poems, by over 600 poets writing in 25 languages. The writing of haiku around the world has increased with the advent of the internet, where one can even find examples of haiku written in Latin, Esperanto, and Klingon, as well as numerous examples in more common languages.

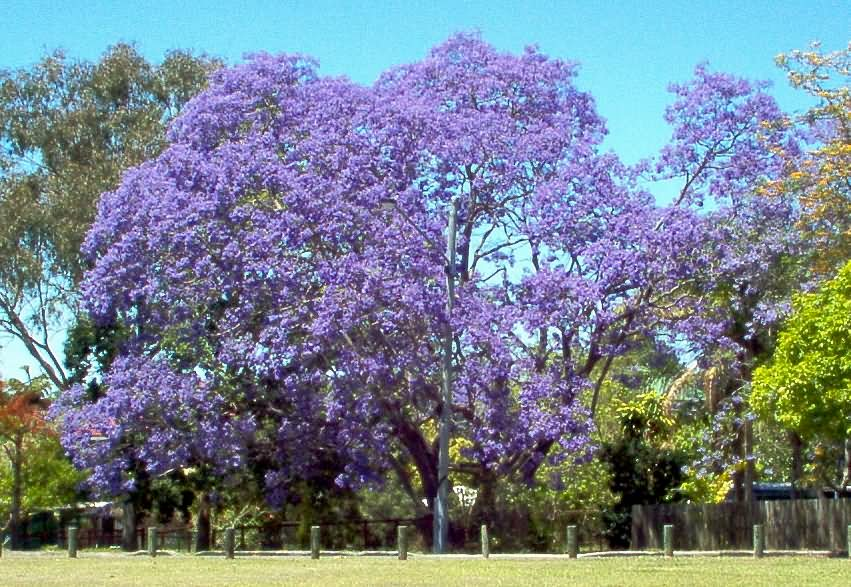
A large Jacaranda tree in full bloom

Different regions internationally have their own lists of kigo. The Southern California Haiku Study group created their own list, which includes regional weather like June gloom and smog, Forest fires, seasonal events like the Tournament of Roses Parade, and local flora like the Jacaranda.

== Kigo and haiku: an example ==
In the famous haiku by Matsuo Bashō below, "frog" (蛙, kawazu) is a kigo for spring. Haiku had been traditionally written about the singing of mating frogs, but Bashō chose to focus on a very different sound.

古池や 蛙飛び込む 水の音	Furuike ya Kawazu tobikomu Mizu no oto	The old pond; A frog jumps in,— The sound of the water.

== Haiku without kigo ==
Haiku without kigo is possible, and are described as Muki 無季 (no-season). Because of the practice of anthologizing haiku in saijiki, haiku that did not mention seasons were not as well-known, and many haiku writers assumed that haiku had to contain a kigo. Poems on non-seasonal topics appeared in the imperial anthology Kokinshū, such as love, travel, and religion. Usually about half the stanzas in a renku do not reference a season. In contemporary haiku composition, Japanese haiku writers disagree about if a haiku requires a kigo, while writers outside of Japan feel free to write haiku without kigo. The Modern Haiku Association of Japan published a collection of kigo in 2004 which included non-seasonal kigo.

== See also ==
- Culture of Japan
- Haiku in English
- List of kigo
