= Kōreisai =

Japanese holiday

Kōreisai (皇霊祭), or Shun-ki (春季, Vernal) and Shū-ki (秋季, Autumnal) Kōreisai, are days of worship in Japan that began in 1878 ( Meiji 11 ) to pay respects to the past emperors and imperial family members. It occurred on the March equinox (spring equinox) and the September equinox (autumn equinox) of the anniversary of the person's death. After the 1948 passing of the Act on National Holidays, these days were marked in a non-religious manner as the national holidays of Vernal Equinox Day and Autumnal Equinox Day. During the event, one prayed for good harvest in the spring and said thank you for the harvest in autumn. The equinoxes were also the days of ancestor veneration in China.

== See also ==
- Japanese Imperial Rituals
