= Autumnal Equinox Day =

Public holiday in Japan

- Official name: 秋分の日 (Shūbun no Hi)
- Observed by: Japan
- Type: Public
- Significance: Commemorates the autumnal equinox
- Celebrations: family reunions, outdoor activities, snacks such as botamochi
- Date: September equinox
- Frequency: annual

Autumnal Equinox Day (秋分の日, Shūbun no Hi) is a public holiday in Japan that usually occurs on September 22 or 23, the date of Southward equinox in Japan Standard Time (autumnal equinox can occur on different dates for different time zones). Due to the necessity of recent astronomical measurements, the date of the holiday is not officially declared until February of the previous year. Autumnal Equinox Day became a public holiday in 1948. In 1947 and before, it was the date of Shūki kōreisai (秋季皇霊祭), an event relating to Shinto. Like other holidays, this holiday was repackaged as a non-religious holiday for the sake of separation of religion and state in Japan's postwar constitution.

== Recent Japanese equinoxes ==
Past observed and future calculated equinoxes in Japan Standard Time.

Year	Vernal	Day of week	Autumnal	Day of week
2013	March 20	Wednesday	September 23	Monday
2014	March 21	Friday	September 23	Tuesday
2015	March 21	Saturday	September 23	Wednesday
2016	March 20	Sunday	September 22	Thursday
2017	March 20	Monday	September 23	Saturday
2018	March 21	Wednesday	September 23	Sunday
2019	March 21	Thursday	September 23	Monday
2020	March 20	Friday	September 22	Tuesday
2021	March 20	Saturday	September 23	Thursday
2022	March 21	Monday	September 23	Friday
2023	March 21	Tuesday	September 23	Saturday
2024	March 20	Wednesday	September 22	Sunday
2025	March 20	Thursday	September 23	Tuesday
2026	March 20	Friday	September 23	Wednesday
2027	March 21	Sunday	September 23	Thursday
2028	March 20	Monday	September 22	Friday
2029	March 20	Tuesday	September 23	Sunday
2030	March 20	Wednesday	September 23	Monday

== Celebration ==
On this day, people will reconnect with their families by tending to the graves of ancestors and visiting shrines and temples. People also celebrate the good weather and autumn harvest by enjoying outdoor activities and eating Shūbun no Hi snacks such as botamochi– a ball of sweet rice in azuki paste.

== See also ==
- Japanese calendar
- Vernal Equinox Day
- Southward equinox
