= Vernal Equinox Day =

Public holiday in Japan

- Official name: 春分の日 (Shunbun no Hi)
- Observed by: Japan
- Type: Public
- Significance: Marks the vernal equinox in Japan Standard Time
- Celebrations: Worship at public shrines, traditional ceremony (Kokutai Cult), rites performed among the Imperial households
- Date: March equinox
- Frequency: Annual

Vernal Equinox Day (春分の日, Shunbun no Hi) is a public holiday in Japan that occurs on the date of the Northward equinox in Japan Standard Time (the vernal equinox can occur on different dates in different time-zones), usually March 20 or 21. The date of the holiday is not officially declared until February of the previous year, due to the need for recent astronomical measurements.

Vernal Equinox Day became a public holiday in 1948. Prior to that it was the date of Shunki kōreisai (春季皇霊祭), an event relating to Shinto. Like other Japanese holidays, this holiday was repackaged as a non-religious holiday for the sake of separation of religion and state in Japan's postwar constitution. Pre-1945 State Shinto or Kokka Shinto is defined as the Shinto activities surrounding the support of government ideals that the government would have control over. These include day to day worship at public shrines and their messages, traditional ceremony (Kokutai Cult) and rites performed among the Imperial households, and shrines specifically symbolizing the death of fallen soldiers in battle. On December 15, 1945, General Douglas MacArthur introduced what would later be called the Shinto Directive. The order was a directive titled the “Abolition of Governmental Sponsorship, Perpetuation, Control, and Dissemination of State Shinto″. This however was difficult due to the Emperor being at the center of many Shinto rituals. The purpose of the mandate was to separate State Shinto and Shrine Shinto which would be separating all government ties to the control of religious activities while supporting public shrines available to everyone and would be supported privately. This would later on be a part of the new Japanese constitution ratified in 1948.

== Recent Japanese equinoxes ==
Past observed and future calculated equinoxes in Japan Standard Time.

Year	Vernal	Day of week	Autumnal	Day of week
2013	March 20	Wednesday	September 23	Monday
2014	March 21	Friday	September 23	Tuesday
2015	March 21	Saturday	September 23	Wednesday
2016	March 20	Sunday	September 22	Thursday
2017	March 20	Monday	September 23	Saturday
2018	March 21	Wednesday	September 23	Sunday
2019	March 21	Thursday	September 23	Monday
2020	March 20	Friday	September 22	Tuesday
2021	March 20	Saturday	September 23	Thursday
2022	March 21	Monday	September 23	Friday
2023	March 21	Tuesday	September 23	Saturday
2024	March 20	Wednesday	September 22	Sunday
2025	March 20	Thursday	September 23	Tuesday
2026	March 20	Friday	September 23	Wednesday
2027	March 21	Sunday	September 23	Thursday
2028	March 20	Monday	September 22	Friday
2029	March 20	Tuesday	September 23	Sunday
2030	March 20	Wednesday	September 23	Monday

== Celebrations ==
Shunbun no Hi is the holiday celebrating the spring (vernal) equinox. It is part of a seven-day period of festival called Haru no Higan. It is one of two points during the year, the other being in the autumn, where the daylight and night hours are of equal length, and is the official change of the seasons. Due to the nature of the holiday revolving around astronomical changes the date of the holiday can change from year to year but it will usually fall anywhere between March 19–22. Back in ancient times, the holiday was originally called Higan no Nakaba, which translates to “Middle of the Equinoctial Week.” The holiday was originally a time to visit loved ones' grave sites and pay homage to the ancestors. The Japanese would also take the time to renew their lives by cleaning their homes and making life changes such as starting or finishing school or a new hobby. Today Shunbun no Hi is a national holiday and the majority of Japanese will have the day off work to celebrate with their families. Many people will return to their homes they originally come from to spend the day with their families. The day is celebrated to bring in the spring season and to appreciate the nature blooming after a long winter. Some people will still visit their loved ones' grave sites, sweep the gravestone clear of debris, and often leave offerings of food or fresh cut flowers.It is common for followers to eat a sweet confection known as botamochi (ぼたもち) that is often used as an offering at shrines, temples, and graves all across Japan during Higan. Botamochi is made using sticky rice and bean paste that is made into a chewy, ball-shaped treat.The holiday is also special to farmers and agriculturalists as a day to pray for good luck and fortune for the crops they may grow in the upcoming season.

== See also ==
- Japanese calendar
- Autumnal Equinox Day
- Nowruz, the Iranian/Persian New Year
- Northward equinox
- Songkran
