= Japanese destroyer Yayoi =

Two destroyers of the Imperial Japanese Navy were named Yayoi:

- Japanese destroyer Yayoi (1905), a Kamikaze-class destroyer launched in 1905 and scuttled in 1926
- Japanese destroyer Yayoi (1925), a Mutsuki-class destroyer launched in 1925 and sunk in 1942
