= Japanese destroyer Satsuki =

Two destroyers of the Imperial Japanese Navy were named Satsuki:

- Japanese destroyer Satsuki (1905), previously the Russian Biedovy captured in 1905 by Japan and renamed. She was stricken in 1913.
- Japanese destroyer Satsuki (1925), a Mutsuki-class destroyer launched in 1925 and sunk in 1944
