= Yayoi (given name) =

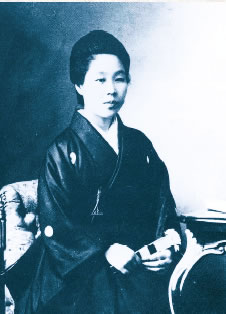
- Yayoi Yoshioka, a Japanese women's rights activist
- Pronunciation: Yayoi
- Gender: Female

Origin
- Origin: Japanese
- Meaning: March extensive, life
- Region of origin: Japanese

Other names
- Related names: Satsuki

Yayoi (やよい, ヤヨイ) is a feminine Japanese given name.

== Written forms ==
Yayoi can be written using different kanji characters and can mean:

- 弥生, third month, "March" in modern calendar, "April" in traditional calendar

as a given name

- 彌生, "extensive, life"

The given name can also be written in hiragana or katakana.

== People with the name ==
- Yayoi Jinguji (弥生; 1965–2017), Japanese voice actress
- Yayoi Kano (加納 弥生; 1963–2019), Japanese artistic gymnast
- Yayoi Kitazume (北爪 やよひ; born 1945), Japanese composer
- Yayoi Kobayashi (小林 弥生; born 1981), Japanese women's footballer
- Yayoi Kusama (彌生 or 弥生; born 1929), Japanese artist
- Yayoi Matsumoto (弥生; born 1990), Japanese swimmer
- Yayoi Nagaoka (長岡 弥生; born 1974), Japanese speed skater
- Yayoi Watanabe (やよい; born 1952), Japanese actress
- Yayoi Yoshioka (彌生; 1871–1959), Japanese physician and women's rights activist

== Fictional characters ==
- Yayoi Akikawa, a character from the video game Umamusume: Pretty Derby
- Yayoi Kise, aka Cure Peace from the shoujo anime Smile PreCure!
- Yayoi, the main heroine of the manga series Mugen Spiral
- Yayoi Tsubaki, a character in the fighting game series BlazBlue
- Yayoi Fujisawa (やよい), a character in the anime series Stellvia of the Universe
- Yayoi Inuzuka (弥生), a character in the light novel, manga, and anime series Kure-nai
- Yayoi Matsunaga (弥生), a character in the anime series Nightwalker: The Midnight Detective
- Yayoi (弥生) Yukino (雪野), the main character in the anime series Queen Millennia
- Yayoi Kamishiro, a main character and possible love interest in the video game Lux-Pain
- Yayoi (弥生), the landlady and "mother" of Hiroe Ogawa in the hentai anime and manga F3: Frantic, Frustrated & Female
- Yayoi Aoba, a character of the manga and anime series Captain Tsubasa
- Yayoi Shinozuka, a character of the visual novel series White Album
- Yayoi Shioiri, a character in the manga Loveless
- Yayoi Takatsuki, a character in the video games series THE iDOLM@STER
- Yayoi Kunizuka, a character in the light novel, manga and anime series Psycho-Pass
- Yayoi Ulshade/KyoryuViolet II, a character in the tokusatsu series "Zyuden Sentai Kyoryuger"
- Yayoi Kuribayashi, a character from the manga and anime series Mouse
