= William J. Higginson =

American writer

- Born: December 17, 1938; New York City
- Died: October 11, 2008 (aged 69); Summit, New Jersey
- Known for: Poetry (haiku and renku)
- Notable work: The Haiku Handbook, The Haiku Seasons, Haiku World

William J. Higginson (December 17, 1938 – October 11, 2008) was an American poet, translator and author most notable for his work with haiku and renku, born in New York City. He was one of the charter members of the Haiku Society of America, and was present at its formation meeting in 1968.

== Life ==
Higginson attended Massachusetts Institute of Technology, then joined the United States Air Force, and was sent by them to study Japanese at Yale University, where his interest in haiku began.

== Career ==
He served for two years at Misawa Air Base in Japan in the early 1960s. Upon return to the US he completed his undergraduate studies, obtaining a BA in English at Southern Connecticut State College in 1969. He edited Haiku Magazine from 1971 to 1976, and ran the literary From Here Press, which published titles by several well-known authors, including Allen Ginsberg, Elizabeth Searle Lamb, and Ruth Stone.

== Legacy ==
Higginson's experience in Japan led him to conclude "the 17 sound structure of Japanese haiku did not translate into 17 syllables in English" and in his translations therefrom stressed more upon "the order of images, the grammar between them (or lack thereof) and the psychological effect of the poems". Higginson's aim was to "bring haiku, full bore into the heat of our own time and place" and make it "a contemporary living art" whilst still remembering that "in Japan they talk of composing haiku rather than writing them".

The primary purpose of reading and writing haiku, Higginson thought, "was in sharing moments of our lives that have moved us, pieces of experience that we offer or share as gifts".

== Major works ==
His three major works, The Haiku Handbook (1985), Haiku World (1996), and The Haiku Seasons (1996), all continue to sell well with internet booksellers, while The Haiku Handbook is one of the most widely read English-language haiku books.

== Bibliography ==
- Itadakimasu: Essays on haiku and senryu in English. J & C Transcripts, 1971
- Cycing Paterson: a Haiku / Senryu Sequence. Seer Ox, 1974
- Christmas night in Paterson. From Here Press, 1975
- Don't you build your highway here. From Here Press, 1975
- Thistle Brilliant Morning: Translations from the Japanese (translator). From Here Press, 1975
- Eastrie. From Here Press, 1975
- Used poems (with Penny Harter). Winter Solstice, 1978
- Union County literature today (with Penny Harter). From Here Press, 1980
- Death Is & Approaches to the Edge. From Here Press, 1981
- Paterson Pieces: Poems 1969-1979. Old Plate Press, 1981
- The big waves : Meisetsu, Shiki, Hekigotō, Kyoshi, Hakyō (translator). Fanwood, 1989
- The Haiku Handbook: How to Write, Share, and Teach Haiku (with Penny Harter). McGraw-Hill, 1985
- The Healing. From Here Press, 1986
- Ten years' collected haiku : volume 1. From Here Press, 1987
- Seasoned haiku : a report on haiku selected by the seasons for publication in Frogpond in 1990, with an invitation to participate. Fanwood, 1990
- Wind in the Long Grass: A Collection of Haiku (an anthology for children). Simon & Schuster, 1991
- Met on the Road: A Transcontinental Haiku Journal. Press Here, 1993
- Haiku Compass: Directions in the Poetical Map of the United States of America. Haiku International Association, 1994
- Haiku World: An International Poetry Almanac. Kodansha, 1996
- The Haiku Seasons: Poetry of the Natural World. Kodansha, 1996
- The seasons in haikai. Irvington Press, 1996
- Red Fuji: Selected Haiku of Yatsuka Ishihara (translator with Tadashi Kondō). From Here Press, 1997
- Over the Wave: Selected Haiku of Ritsuo Okada (translator). From Here Press, 2001
- Kiyose: Seasonword Guide. From Here Press, 2005
- A Summer Surgery / Waiting (with Penny Harter). From Here Press, 2005
- Sixty instant messages to Tom Moore (with Paul Muldoon and Lee Gurga). Modern Haiku Press, 2005
- Butterfly Dreams: The Seasons through Haiku and Photographs CD-ROM with photographs by Michael Lustbader, 2006
- Surfing on Magma. From Here Press, 2006
- 4 Sequences. From Here Press, 2007

== Grants, awards, and other recognitions ==
- Member, Selection Committee for the Masaoka Shiki International Haiku Awards in International Haiku, Ehime Prefecture Culture Foundation, Japan (2000, 2002, 2004).
- Honorary Curator, American Haiku Archive, California State Library, Sacramento, California, USA (2003–2004).
- Haiku Society of America Merit Book Award for translation (with Tadashi Kondō), for Red Fuji: Selected Haiku of Yatsuka Ishihara (1998).
- Translation Grant, Witter Bynner Foundation for Poetry (1994).
- Inducted into the New Jersey Literary Hall of Fame (1989).
- Member, Governor's Task Force on Literacy in the Arts, a New Jersey Educational Commission (1987–1989).
- Haiku Society of America Merit Book Award for Textbook/Scholarly Work (with Penny Harter), for The Haiku Handbook: How to Write, Share, and Teach Haiku (1986).
- Writing Fellowship in Poetry, New Jersey State Council on the Arts (1977).
- Haiku Society of America Merit Book Award for critical writing, for Itadakimasu: Essays on Haiku and Senryu in English (1974, one of the first Merit Book Awards).
- Prize for Best Haiku of the Meeting, Haiku Society of America (May 1969):

The clock

chimes, chimes and stops,

but the river . . .

== See also ==
- Monostich
- Haiku
- Haiku in English
