= Japanese calendar =

Calendars used in Japan past and present

Today (at UTC+00)
- Tuesday, 17 November 2026
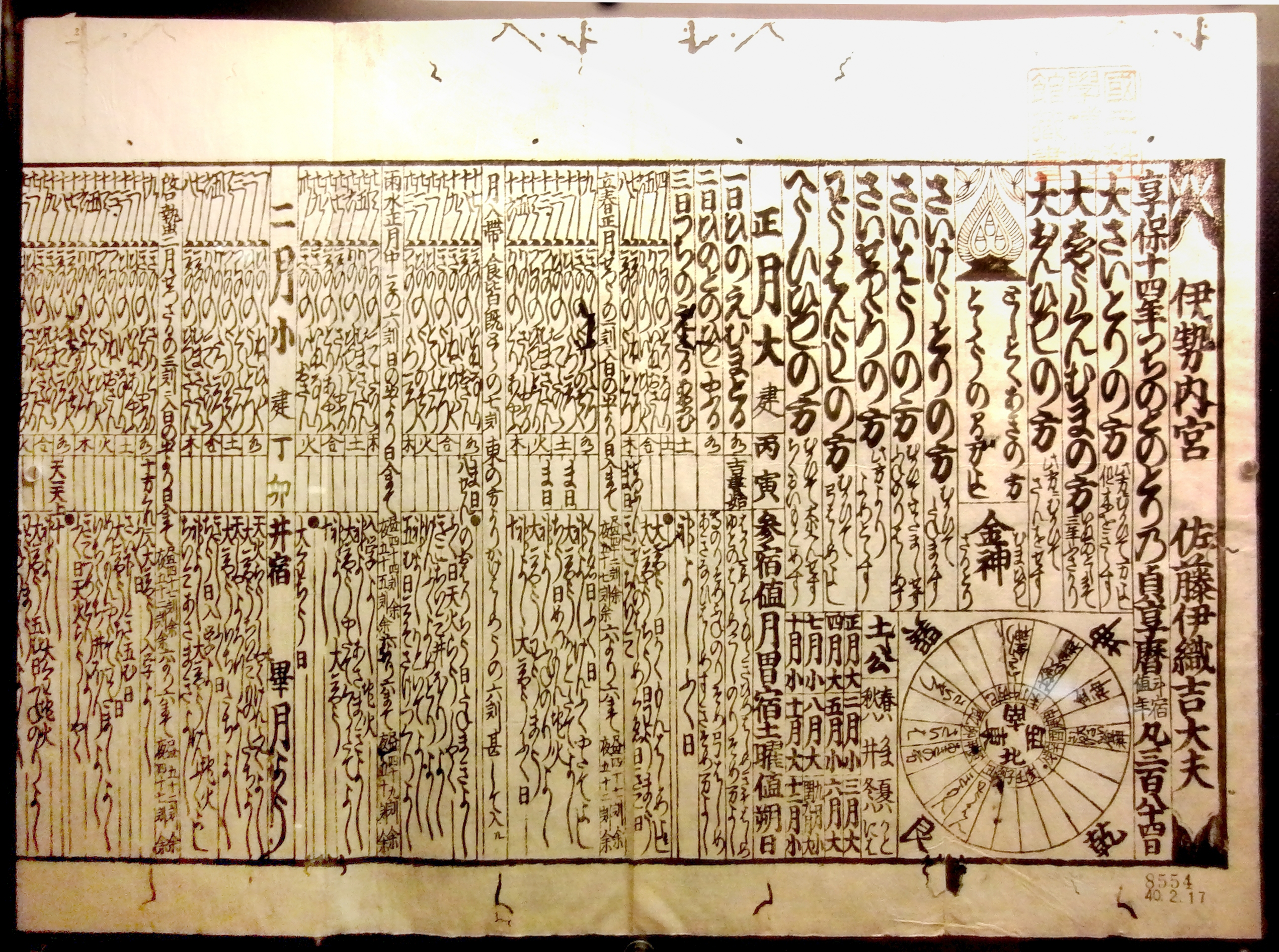
- 1729 calendar, which used the Jōkyō calendar procedure, published by Ise Grand Shrine
- Japanese: 9 Kannazuki, Reiwa 8 (Rittō, 5 days until Shōsetsu)
Other calendars
Akan	Kwabene
Armenian	30 Trē 1476
Aztec	Tlacaxipehualiztli 6, 13 Quiyahuitl
Babylonian	6 Arakhsamna, 2337 SE
Balinese pawukon	Menga, Beteng, Sri, Pon, Was, Anggara of Ukir, Sri, Ogan, Pandita
Bengali	2 Ogrohayon, BS 1433
Chinese	Yin Wood Goat・Tail Mansion; Fire Horse Year, Month 10, Day 9 (Lidong, 5 days until Xiaoxue)
Common Era	17 November 2026 CE
Coptic	8 Hathor, AM 1743
Egyptian	5 Pharmuthi, 2775 NE
Ethiopian	8 H̱edār, 2019 Amätä Məhrät
French Republican	Décade III, Sextidi de Brumaire de l'Année 235 de la République
Gregorian	17 November, AD 2026
Hebrew	7 Kislev, AM 5787
Hindu	Dhaniṣṭhā・Vṛddhi; Solar: 1 Mārgaśīrṣa, 1948 SE; Lunisolar: Aṣṭamī, Śukla pakṣa of Kārtika, 2083 VE; Rāudra・5127 KY・1,872,896
Icelandic	Þriðjudagur, 25 Gormánuður 2026
Islamic	6 Jumada al-thani, AH 1448 (using tabular method)
ISO week date	2026-W47-2
Julian	4 November, AD 2026 (AM 7535)
Julian day	2461362
Korean	9 Dwaejidal, 4359 DE
Maya	13.0.14.1.19; 12 Ceh, 13 Cauac
Roman	Pridie Nonas Novembres, MMDCCLXXIX AUC
Solar Hijri	26 Aban, SH 1405
Tibetan	8 smin drug, me pho rta 2153 or 1772 or 1000

Japanese calendar types have included a range of official and unofficial systems. At present, Japan uses the Gregorian calendar together with year designations stating the year of the reign of the current Emperor. The written form starts with the year, then the month and finally the day, coinciding with the ISO 8601 standard.

For example, February 16, 2003, can be written as either 2003年2月16日 or 平成15年2月16日 (the latter following the regnal year system). 年 reads nen and means "year", 月 reads gatsu and means "month", and finally 日 (usually) reads nichi (its pronunciation depends on the number that precedes it, see below) and means "day".

Prior to the introduction of the Gregorian calendar in 1873, the reference calendar was based on the lunisolar Chinese calendar.

== History ==
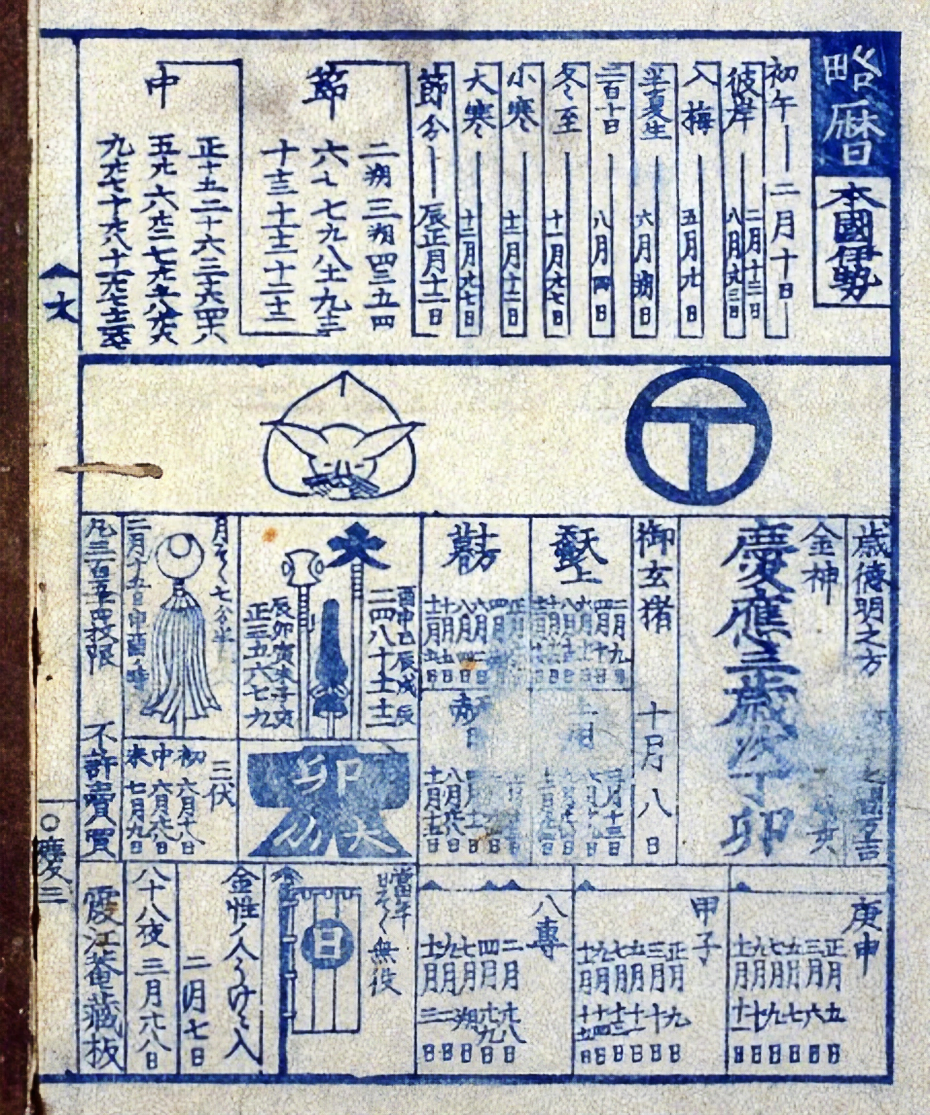
Japanese Calendar (woodcut, 1867)

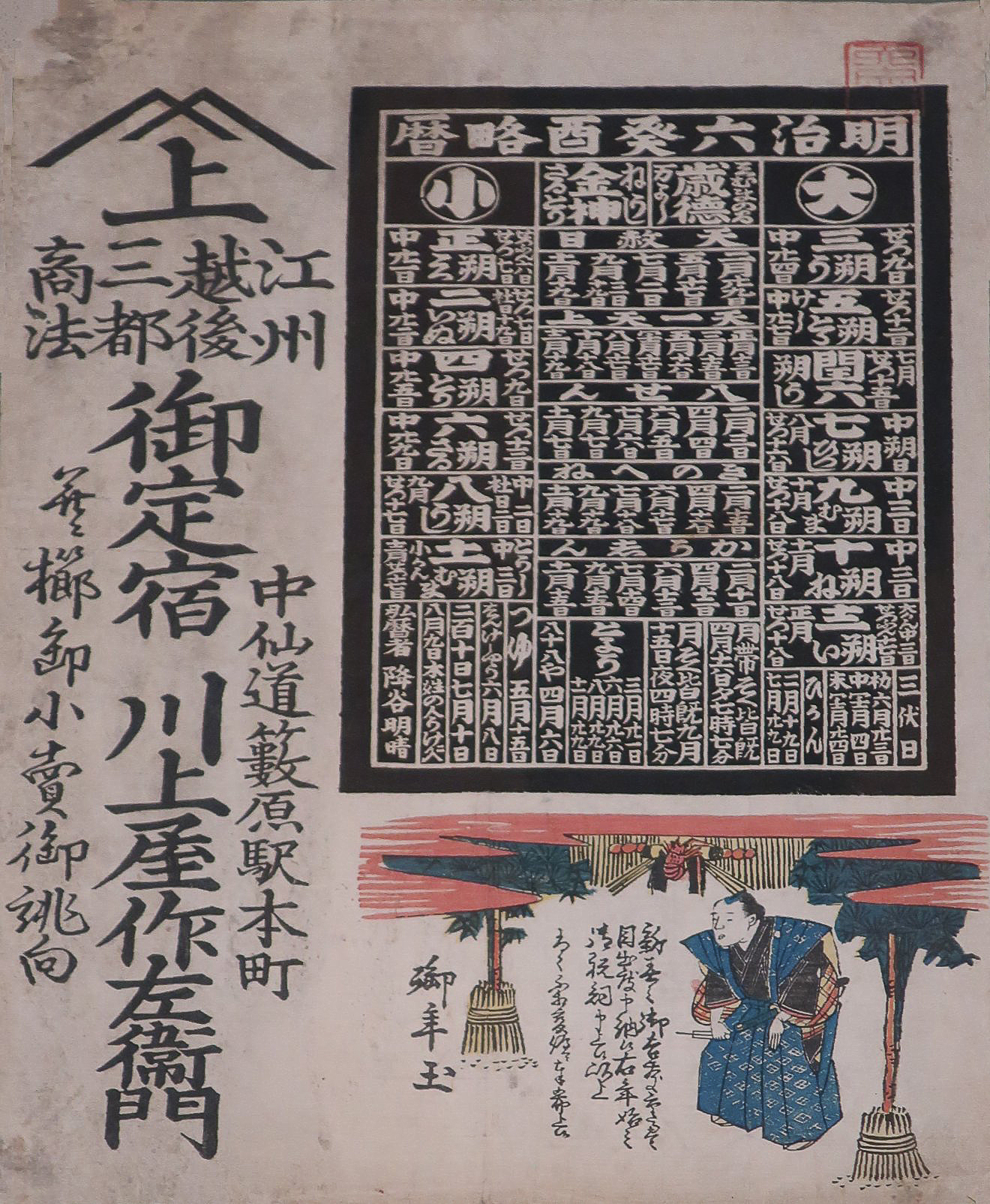
Briefly Abridged Calendar of 1873

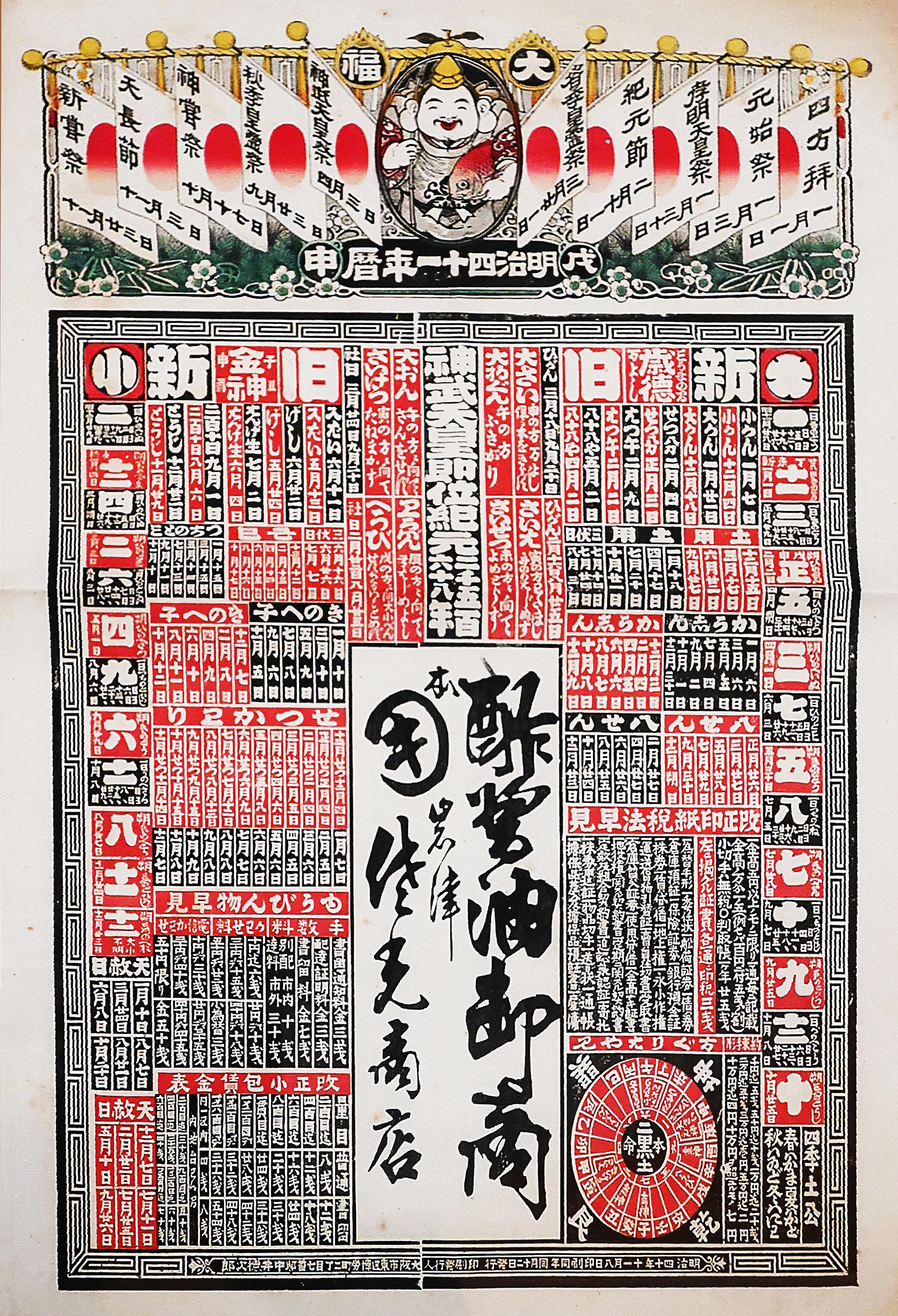
Calendar for 1907

Over the centuries, Japan has used up to four systems for designating years: the Chinese sexagenary cycle, the era name (元号, gengō) system, the Japanese imperial year (皇紀 (kōki) or 紀元 (kigen)) and the Western Common Era (Anno Domini) (西暦, seireki) system. In the 21st century, however, the era system (gengō) and Western system (seireki) are the only ones still widely used.

=== Chinese calendar ===
The lunisolar Chinese calendar was introduced to Japan via Korea in the middle of the sixth century. After that, Japan calculated its calendar using various Chinese calendar procedures, and from 1685, using Japanese variations of the Chinese procedures. Its sexagenary cycle was often used together with era names, as in the 1729 Ise calendar shown above, which is for "the 14th year of Kyōhō, tsuchi-no-to no tori", i.e., 己酉.

In modern times, the old Chinese calendar is virtually ignored; celebrations of the Lunar New Year are thus limited to Chinese and other Asian immigrant communities. However, its influence can still be felt in the idea of "lucky and unlucky days" (described below), the traditional meanings behind the name of each month, and other features of modern Japanese calendars.

=== Era names (gengō) ===
The era name (元号, gengō) system was also introduced from China, and has been in continuous use since AD 701. The reigning Emperor chooses the name associated with their regnal eras; before 1868, multiple names were chosen throughout the same emperor's rule, such as to commemorate a major event. For instance, the Emperor Kōmei's reign (1846–1867) was split into seven eras, one of which lasted only one year. Starting with Kōmei's son the Emperor Meiji in 1868, there has only been one gengō per emperor representing their entire reign.

The gengō system remains in wide use, especially on official documents and government forms. It is also in general use in private and personal business.

The present era, Reiwa, formally began on 1 May 2019. The name of the new era was announced by the Japanese government on 1 April 2019, a month prior to Naruhito's accession to the throne. The previous era, Heisei, came to an end on 30 April 2019, after Japan's former emperor, Akihito, abdicated the throne. Reiwa is the first era name whose characters come from a Japanese root source; prior eras' names were taken from Chinese classic literature.

=== Japanese imperial years (kōki or kigen) ===
The Japanese imperial year (皇紀 (kōki) or 紀元 (kigen)) is based on the date of the legendary founding of Japan by Emperor Jimmu in 660 BC. For instance, 660 BC is counted as Kōki 1. It was first used in the official calendar in 1873. Kōki 2600 (1940) was a special year. The 1940 Summer Olympics and Tokyo Expo were planned as anniversary events, but were canceled due to the Second Sino-Japanese War. The Japanese naval Zero Fighter was named after this year. After the Second World War, the United States occupied Japan, and stopped the use of kōki by officials.

Today, kōki is rarely used, except in some judicial contexts. Usage of kōki dating can be a nationalist signal, pointing out that the history of Japan's imperial family is longer than that of Christianity, the basis of the Anno Domini (AD) system.

The 1898 law determining the placement of leap years is officially based on the kōki years, using a formula that is effectively equivalent to that of the Gregorian calendar: if the kōki year number is evenly divisible by four, it is a leap year, unless the number minus 660 is evenly divisible by 100 and not by 400. Thus, for example, the year Kōki 2560 (AD 1900) is divisible by 4; but 2560 − 660 = 1900, which is evenly divisible by 100 and not by 400, so kōki 2560 was not a leap year, just as in most of the rest of the world.

=== Gregorian calendar (seireki) ===
The Western Common Era (Anno Domini) (西暦, seireki) system, based on the solar Gregorian calendar, was first introduced in 1873 as part of the Japan's Meiji period modernization.

Nowadays, Japanese people know it as well as the regnal eras.

== Divisions of time ==
=== Seasons ===
There are four seasons corresponding to the West's. Unlike those, they traditionally do not begin with an equinox or a solstice but have it roughly in their center, so they begin six to seven weeks earlier than their European counterparts:

4 astronomic seasons
English name	Japanese name	Romanization	Traditional dates	Length
Spring	春	haru	April 5 – April 23	18
Summer	夏	natsu	April 24 – November 2	192
Fall	秋	aki	November 2 – November 7	5
Winter	冬	fuyu	November 8 – April 4	218

==== Solar terms and micro-seasons ====
There is also a traditional system of 72 microseasons (候, kō), consisting of 24 solar terms (節気, sekki) each divided into three sets of five days, and with specially-named days or Zassetsu (雑節) indicating the start and end of each.

This system was adapted from the Chinese in 1685 by court astronomer Shibukawa Shunkai, rewriting the names to better match the local climate and nature in his native Japan. Each kō has traditional customs, festivals, foods, flowers and birds associated with it:

The kō have also been referred to as 5-day weeks, although some may be 6 days or even just 4 days long.

24 solar terms (sekki) divided into 72 micro-seasons (kō)
Solar term	Kō number	Traditional dates	Length	Japanese name	Romanization	Translation
Risshun (立春, Beginning of spring)	01	February 4–8	5	東風解凍	Harukaze kōri o toku	The east wind melts the thick ice.
Risshun (立春, Beginning of spring)	02	February 9–13	5	黄鶯睍睆	Kōō kenkan su	Bush warblers sing in the countryside.
Risshun (立春, Beginning of spring)	03	February 14–18	5	魚上氷	Uo kōri o izuru	Ice cracks, allowing fish to emerge.
Usui (雨水, Rain Water)	04	February 19–23	5	土脉潤起	Tsuchi no shō uruoi okoru	Rain falls, moistening the soil.
Usui (雨水, Rain Water)	05	February 24–28	5+	霞始靆	Kasumi hajimete tanabiku	Mist lies over the land.
Usui (雨水, Rain Water)	06	March 1–5	5	草木萌動	Sōmoku mebae izuru	Trees and plants put forth buds.
Keichitsu (啓蟄, Insects awakening)	07	March 6–10	5	蟄虫啓戸	Sugomori mushito o hiraku	Hibernating insects emerge.
Keichitsu (啓蟄, Insects awakening)	08	March 11–15	5	桃始笑	Momo hajimete saku	Peach trees begin to bloom.
Keichitsu (啓蟄, Insects awakening)	09	March 16–20	5	菜虫化蝶	Namushi chō to naru	Cabbage whites emerge from their cocoons.
Shunbun (春分, Spring equinox)	10	March 21–25	5	雀始巣	Suzume hajimete sukū	Sparrows begin building their nests.
Shunbun (春分, Spring equinox)	11	March 26–30	5	櫻始開	Sakura hajimete saku	Cherry blossoms begin to bloom.
Shunbun (春分, Spring equinox)	12	March 31 – April 4	5	雷乃発声	Kaminari sunawachi koe o hassu	Thunder rumbles far away.
Seimei (清明, Fresh green)	13	April 5–9	5	玄鳥至	Tsubame kitaru	Swallows return from the south.
Seimei (清明, Fresh green)	14	April 10–14	5	鴻雁北	Kōgan kaeru	Wild geese fly north.
Seimei (清明, Fresh green)	15	April 15–19	5	虹始見	Niji hajimete arawaru	Rainbows begin to appear.
Kokuu (穀雨, Grain rain)	16	April 20–24	5	葭始生	Ashi hajimete shōzu	Reeds begin to sprout.
Kokuu (穀雨, Grain rain)	17	April 25–29	5	霜止出苗	Shimo yamite nae izuru	Rice seedlings grow.
Kokuu (穀雨, Grain rain)	18	April 30 – May 4	5	牡丹華	Botan hana saku	Peonies bloom.
Rikka (立夏, Beginning of summer)	19	May 5–9	5	蛙始鳴	Kawazu hajimete naku	Frogs begin croaking.
Rikka (立夏, Beginning of summer)	20	May 10–14	5	蚯蚓出	Mimizu izuru	Worms wriggle to the surface.
Rikka (立夏, Beginning of summer)	21	May 15–20	6	竹笋生	Takenoko shōzu	Bamboo shoots sprout.
Shōman (小満, Lesser fullness)	22	May 21–25	5	蚕起食桑	Kaiko okite kuwa o hamu	Silkworms feast on mulberry leaves.
Shōman (小満, Lesser fullness)	23	May 26–30	5	紅花栄	Benibana sakau	Safflowers bloom in abundance.
Shōman (小満, Lesser fullness)	24	May 31 – June 5	6	麦秋至	Mugi no toki itaru	Barley ripens, ready to be harvested.
Bōshu (芒種, Grain in ear)	25	June 6–10	5	蟷螂生	Kamakiri shōzu	Praying mantises hatch and come forth.
Bōshu (芒種, Grain in ear)	26	June 11–15	5	腐草為螢	Kusaretaru kusa hotaru to naru	Fireflies fly out from moist grass.
Bōshu (芒種, Grain in ear)	27	June 16–20	5	梅子黄	Ume no mi kibamu	Plums ripen, turning yellow.
Geshi (夏至, Summer solstice)	28	June 21–26	6	乃東枯	Natsukarekusa karuru	Prunella flowers wither.
Geshi (夏至, Summer solstice)	29	June 27 – July 1	5	菖蒲華	Ayame hana saku	Irises bloom.
Geshi (夏至, Summer solstice)	30	July 2–6	5	半夏生	Hange shōzu	Crowdipper sprouts.
Shōsho (小暑, Lesser heat)	31	July 7–11	5	温風至	Atsukaze itaru	Warm winds blow.
Shōsho (小暑, Lesser heat)	32	July 12–16	5	蓮始開	Hasu hajimete hiraku	Lotuses begin to bloom.
Shōsho (小暑, Lesser heat)	33	July 17–22	6	鷹乃学習	Taka sunawachi waza o narau	Young hawks learn to fly.
Taisho (大暑, Greater heat)	34	July 23–28	6	桐始結花	Kiri hajimete hana o musubu	Paulownia trees begin to produce seeds.
Taisho (大暑, Greater heat)	35	July 29 – August 2	5	土潤溽暑	Tsuchi uruōte mushi atsushi	The ground is damp, the air hot and humid.
Taisho (大暑, Greater heat)	36	August 3–7	5	大雨時行	Taiu tokidoki furu	Heavy rains fall.
Risshū (立秋, Beginning of autumn)	37	August 8–12	5	涼風至	Suzukaze itaru	Cool winds blow.
Risshū (立秋, Beginning of autumn)	38	August 13–17	5	寒蝉鳴	Higurashi naku	Evening cicadas begin to sing.
Risshū (立秋, Beginning of autumn)	39	August 18–22	5	蒙霧升降	Fukaki kiri matō	Thick fog blankets the land.
Shosho (処暑, End of heat)	40	August 23–27	5	綿柎開	Wata no hana shibe hiraku	Cotton bolls open.
Shosho (処暑, End of heat)	41	August 28 – September 1	5	天地始粛	Tenchi hajimete samushi	The heat finally relents.
Shosho (処暑, End of heat)	42	September 2–7	6	禾乃登	Kokumono sunawachi minoru	Rice ripens.
Hakuro (白露, White dew)	43	September 8–12	5	草露白	Kusa no tsuyu shiroshi	White dew shimmers on the grass.
Hakuro (白露, White dew)	44	September 13–17	5	鶺鴒鳴	Sekirei naku	Wagtails begin to sing.
Hakuro (白露, White dew)	45	September 18–22	5	玄鳥去	Tsubame saru	Swallows return to the south.
Shūbun (秋分, Autumn equinox)	46	September 23–27	5	雷乃収声	Kaminari sunawachi koe o osamu	Thunder comes to an end.
Shūbun (秋分, Autumn equinox)	47	September 28 – October 2	5	蟄虫坏戸	Mushi kakurete to o fusagu	Insects close up their burrows.
Shūbun (秋分, Autumn equinox)	48	October 3–7	5	水始涸	Mizu hajimete karuru	Fields are drained of water.
Kanro (寒露, Cold dew)	49	October 8–12	5	鴻雁来	Kōgan kitaru	Wild geese begin to fly back.
Kanro (寒露, Cold dew)	50	October 13–17	5	菊花開	Kiku no hana hiraku	Chrysanthemums bloom.
Kanro (寒露, Cold dew)	51	October 18–22	5	蟋蟀在戸	Kirigirisu to ni ari	Crickets chirp by the door.
Sōkō (霜降, First frost)	52	October 23–27	5	霜始降	Shimo hajimete furu	Frost begins to form.
Sōkō (霜降, First frost)	53	October 28 – November 1	5	霎時施	Kosame tokidoki furu	Drizzling rain falls gently.
Sōkō (霜降, First frost)	54	November 2–6	5	楓蔦黄	Momiji tsuta kibamu	Maple leaves and ivy turn yellow.
Rittō (立冬, Beginning of winter)	55	November 7–11	5	山茶始開	Tsubaki hajimete hiraku	Sasanqua camellias begin to bloom.
Rittō (立冬, Beginning of winter)	56	November 12–16	5	地始凍	Chi hajimete kōru	The land begins to freeze.
Rittō (立冬, Beginning of winter)	57	November 17–21	5	金盞香	Kinsenka saku	Daffodils bloom.
Shōsetsu (小雪, Light snow)	58	November 22–26	5	虹蔵不見	Niji kakurete miezu	Rainbows disappear.
Shōsetsu (小雪, Light snow)	59	November 27 – December 1	5	朔風払葉	Kitakaze konoha o harau	The north wind blows leaves off the trees.
Shōsetsu (小雪, Light snow)	60	December 2–6	5	橘始黄	Tachibana hajimete kibamu	Tachibana citrus trees begin to turn yellow.
Taisetsu (大雪, Heavy snow)	61	December 7–11	5	閉塞成冬	Sora samuku fuyu to naru	The skies stay cold as winter arrives.
Taisetsu (大雪, Heavy snow)	62	December 12–16	5	熊蟄穴	Kuma ana ni komoru	Bears hide away in their dens to hibernate.
Taisetsu (大雪, Heavy snow)	63	December 17–21	5	鱖魚群	Sake no uo muragaru	Salmon swim upstream en masse.
Tōji (冬至, Winter solstice)	64	December 22–26	5	乃東生	Natsukarekusa shōzu	Prunella sprouts.
Tōji (冬至, Winter solstice)	65	December 27–31	5	麋角解	Sawashika no tsuno otsuru	Deer shed their antlers.
Tōji (冬至, Winter solstice)	66	January 1–4	4	雪下出麦	Yuki watarite mugi nobiru	Barley sprouts under the snow.
Shōkan (小寒, Lesser cold)	67	January 5–9	5	芹乃栄	Seri sunawachi sakau	Parsley thrives.
Shōkan (小寒, Lesser cold)	68	January 10–14	5	水泉動	Shimizu atataka o fukumu	Springs once frozen flow once more.
Shōkan (小寒, Lesser cold)	69	January 15–19	5	雉始雊	Kiji hajimete naku	Cock pheasants begin to call.
Daikan (大寒, Greater cold)	70	January 20–24	5	款冬華	Fuki no hana saku	Butterburs put forth buds.
Daikan (大寒, Greater cold)	71	January 25–29	5	水沢腹堅	Sawamizu kōri tsumeru	Mountain streams gain a cover of thick ice.
Daikan (大寒, Greater cold)	72	January 30 – February 3	5	鶏始乳	Niwatori hajimete toya ni tsuku	Hens begin to lay eggs.

==== Zassetsu ====
Zassetsu (雑節) is a collective term for special seasonal days within the 24 sekki.

Zassetsu holidays
Date	Kanji	Romaji	Comment
February 3	節分	Setsubun	the eve of Risshun by one definition
March 18 – March 24	春彼岸	Haru higan	the seven days surrounding the start of Shunbun
c. March 21, vernal equinox day	春社日	Haru shanichi	in Shinto
c. March 21, vernal equinox day	彼岸中日	Higan Chūnichi	in Buddhism
May 2	八十八夜	Hachijū hachiya	literally meaning 88 nights (since Risshun)
June 11	入梅	Nyūbai	literally meaning entering tsuyu
July 2	半夏生	Hangeshō	farmers take five days off in some regions
July 15	中元	Chūgen	officially July 15, but August 15 in many regions (Tsuki-okure)
July 20	夏の土用	Natsu no doyō	custom of eating eel on this day
September 1	二百十日	Nihyaku tōka	literally meaning 210 days (since Risshun)
September 11	二百二十日	Nihyaku hatsuka	literally meaning 220 days
September 20 – September 26	秋彼岸	Aki higan	the seven days surrounding the start of Shūbun
c. September 23, Autumn equinox	秋社日	Aki shanichi	in Shinto
c. September 23, Autumn equinox	彼岸中日	Higan Chūnichi	in Buddhism

Shanichi dates can vary by as much as 5 days. Chūgen has a fixed day. All other days can vary by one day.

Many zassetsu days occur in multiple seasons:

- Doyō (土用) refers to the 18 days before each season, especially the one before fall which is known as the hottest period of a year.
- Higan (彼岸) is the seven middle days of spring and autumn, with Shunbun at the middle of the seven days for spring, Shūbun for fall.
- Shanichi (社日) is the Tsuchinoe (戊) day closest to Shunbun (middle of spring) or Shūbun (middle of fall), which can be as much as 5 days before to 4 days after Shunbun/Shūbun.

The term Setsubun (節分) originally referred to the eves of Risshun (立春, 315°, the beginning of spring), Rikka (立夏, 45°, the beginning of summer), Risshū (立秋, 135°, the beginning of autumn), and Rittō (立冬, 225°, the beginning of winter); however, it now only refers to the day before Risshun.

=== Months ===
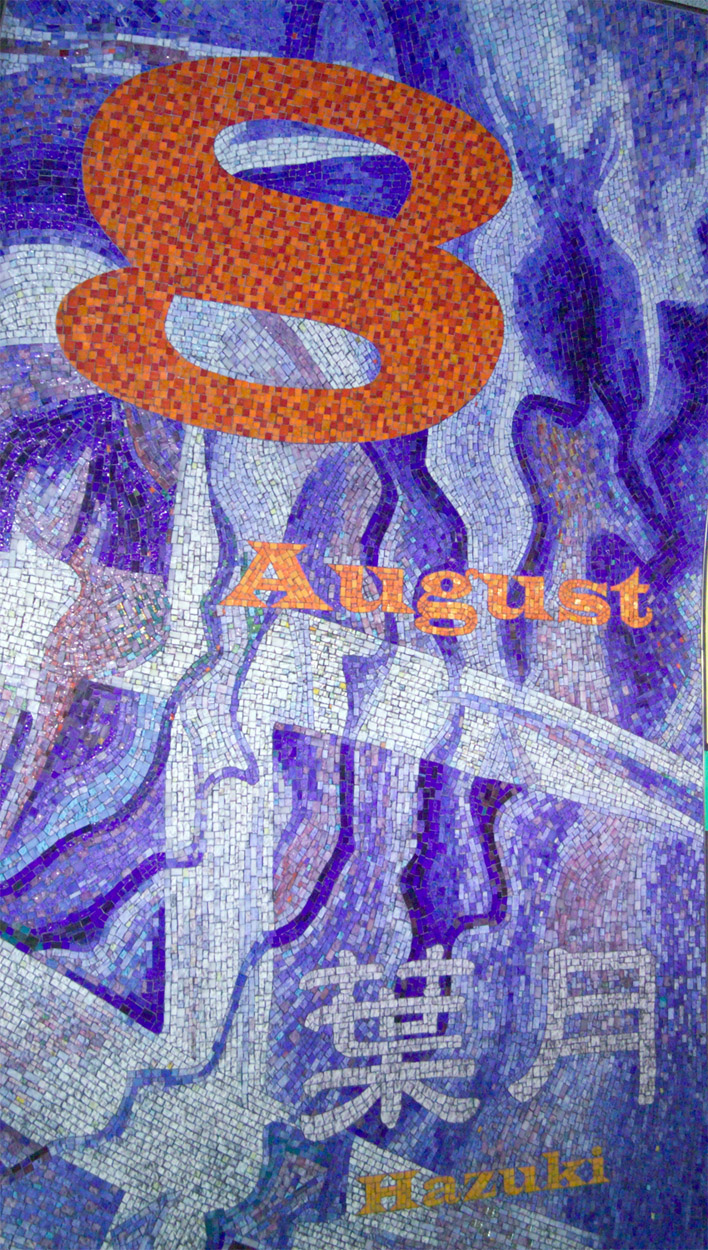
This mural on the wall of Shin-Ochanomizu subway station in Tokyo celebrates Hazuki, the eighth month.

As mentioned above, the Japanese calendar was previously based on an adaptation of the Chinese lunisolar calendar, which begins 3 to 7 weeks later than the Gregorian. In other words, the Gregorian "first month" and the Chinese "first month" do not align, which is important in historical contexts.

The "traditional names" for each month, shown below, are still used by some in fields such as poetry; of the twelve, Shiwasu is still widely used today. The opening paragraph of a letter or the greeting in a speech might borrow one of these names to convey a sense of the season. Some, such as Yayoi and Satsuki, do double duty as given names (for women). These month names also appear from time to time on jidaigeki, contemporary television shows and movies set in the Edo period or earlier.

The Japanese names for the modern Gregorian months literally translate to "first month", "second month", and so on. The corresponding number is combined with the suffix 月 (-gatsu, "month"). The table below uses traditional numerals, but the use of Western numerals (1月, 2月, 3月, etc.) is common.

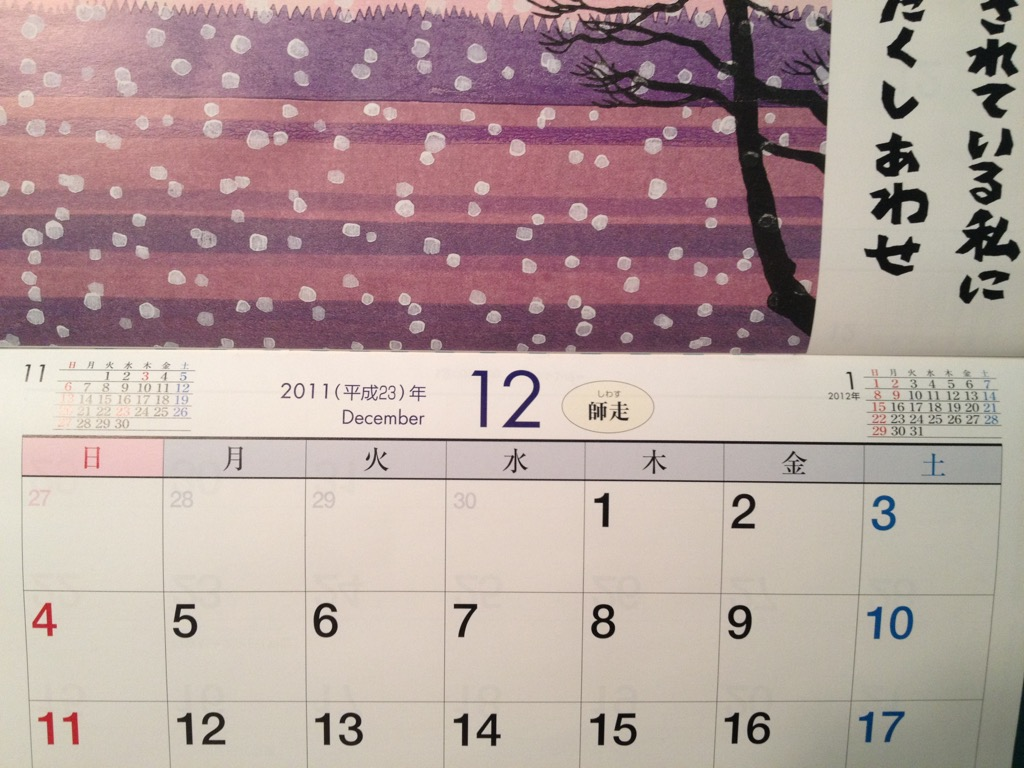
A Japanese calendar from 2011 depicting the month of December, shiwasu (師走)

English name	Common Japanese name	Traditional Japanese name	Traditional equivalent
January	一月 (ichigatsu)	Mutsuki (睦月, "Month of love" or "Month of affection").	February
February	二月 (nigatsu)	Kisaragi (如月) or Kinusaragi (衣更着, "Changing clothes").	March
March	三月 (sangatsu)	Yayoi (弥生, "New life").	April
April	四月 (shigatsu)	Uzuki (卯月, "u-no-hana month"). The u-no-hana (卯の花) is a flower, of the genus Deutzia.	May
May	五月 (gogatsu)	Satsuki (皐月) or Sanaetsuki (早苗月, "Early-rice-planting month").	June
June	六月 (rokugatsu)	Minazuki (水無月, "Month of water"). The 無 character, which normally means "absent" or "there is no", is ateji here, and is only used for the na sound. In this name the na is actually a possessive particle, so minazuki means "month of water", not "month without water", and this is in reference to the flooding of the rice fields, which require large quantities of water.	July
July	七月 (shichigatsu)	Fumizuki (文月, "Month of erudition").	August
August	八月 (hachigatsu)	Hazuki (葉月, "Month of leaves"). In old Japanese, the month was called 葉落ち月 (Haochizuki, or "month of falling leaves").	September
September	九月 (kugatsu)	Nagatsuki (長月, The long month).	October
October	十月 (jūgatsu)	Kannazuki or Kaminazuki (神無月, "Month of the gods"). The 無 character, which normally means "absent" or "there is not", was here probably originally used as an ateji for the possessive particle na, so Kaminazuki may have originally meant "month of the gods", not "month without gods" (Kaminakizuki), similarly to Minatsuki, the "month of water". However, by what may be false etymology, the name became commonly interpreted to mean that, because in that month all the Shinto kami gather at Izumo shrine in Izumo Province (modern-day Shimane Prefecture), there are no gods in the rest of the country. Thus in Izumo Province, the month is called Kamiarizuki (神有月 or 神在月, "month with gods"). Various other etymologies have also been suggested from time to time.	November
November	十一月 (jūichigatsu)	Shimotsuki (霜月, "Month of frost").	December
December	十二月 (jūnigatsu)	Shiwasu (師走, "Priests running"). This is in reference to priests being busy at the end of the year for New Year's preparations and blessings.	January

=== Division of the month ===
==== Week ====
Japan uses a seven-day week, aligned with the Western calendar. The seven-day week, with names for the days corresponding to the Latin system, was brought to Japan around AD 800 with the Buddhist calendar. The system was used for astrological purposes and little else until 1876.

Much like in multiple European languages, in which the names for weekdays are, partially or fully, based on what the Ancient Romans considered the seven visible planets, meaning the five visible planets and the sun and the moon, in the Far East the five visible planets are named after the five Chinese elements (metal, wood, water, fire, earth.) On the origin of the names of the days of the week, also see East Asian Seven Luminaries.

Japanese	Romanization	Element (planet)	English name
日曜日	nichiyōbi	Sun	Sunday
月曜日	getsuyōbi	Moon	Monday
火曜日	kayōbi	Fire (Mars)	Tuesday
水曜日	suiyōbi	Water (Mercury)	Wednesday
木曜日	mokuyōbi	Wood (Jupiter)	Thursday
金曜日	kin'yōbi	Metal (Venus)	Friday
土曜日	doyōbi	Earth (Saturn)	Saturday

Sunday and Saturday are regarded as "Western style take-a-rest days". Since the late 19th century, Sunday has been regarded as a "full-time holiday", and Saturday a half-time holiday (半ドン, han-don). These days have no religious meaning (except the less than 1% who are Christian or Jewish). Many Japanese retailers do not close on Saturdays or Sundays, because many office workers and their families are expected to visit the shops during the weekend. Monday is traditionally the first day of the week.

==== 10-days (jun) ====
Japanese people also use 10-day periods called jun (旬). Each month is divided into two 10-day periods and a third with the remaining 8 to 11 days:

- The first (from the 1st to the 10th) is jōjun (上旬, upper jun)
- The second (from the 11th to the 20th), chūjun (中旬, middle jun)
- The last (from the 21st to the end of the month), gejun (下旬, lower jun).

These are frequently used to indicate approximate times, for example, "the temperatures are typical of the jōjun of April"; "a vote on a bill is expected during the gejun of this month". The magazine Kinema Junpo was originally published once every jun (i.e. three times a month).

=== Days ===
The list below shows dates written with traditional numerals, but use of Arabic numerals (1日, 2日, 3日, etc.) is extremely common in everyday communication, almost the norm.

1. 一日 (tsuitachi)
2. 二日 (futsuka)
3. 三日 (mikka)
4. 四日 (yokka)
5. 五日 (itsuka)
6. 六日 (muika)
7. 七日 (nanoka)
8. 八日 (yōka)
9. 九日 (kokonoka)
10. 十日 (tōka)
11. 十一日 (jūichi-nichi)
12. 十二日 (jūni-nichi)
13. 十三日 (jūsan-nichi)
14. 十四日 (jūyokka), jūyon-nichi
15. 十五日 (jūgo-nichi)
16. 十六日 (jūroku-nichi)
17. 十七日 (jūshichi-nichi)
18. 十八日 (jūhachi-nichi)
19. 十九日 (jūkyū-nichi), jūku-nichi
20. 二十日 (hatsuka)
21. 二十一日 (nijūichi-nichi)
22. 二十二日 (nijūni-nichi)
23. 二十三日 (nijūsan-nichi)
24. 二十四日 (nijūyokka), nijūyon-nichi
25. 二十五日 (nijūgo-nichi)
26. 二十六日 (nijūroku-nichi)
27. 二十七日 (nijūshichi-nichi)
28. 二十八日 (nijūhachi-nichi)
29. 二十九日 (nijūkyū-nichi), nijūku-nichi
30. 三十日 (sanjū-nichi)
31. 三十一日 (sanjūichi-nichi)

Each day of the month has a semi-systematic name. The days generally use kun (native Japanese) numeral readings up to ten, and thereafter on (Chinese-derived) readings, but there are some irregularities.

Tsuitachi is a worn-down form of tsuki-tachi (月立ち), literally "calendar month start". The last day of the month was called tsugomori, which means "moon hidden". This classical word comes from the tradition of the lunisolar calendar.

The 30th was also traditionally called misoka, just as the 20th is called hatsuka. Nowadays, the terms for the numbers 28–31 plus nichi are much more common. However, misoka is much used in contracts, etc., specifying that a payment should be made on or by the last day of the month, whatever the number is. New Year's Eve is known as Ōmisoka (大晦日, big 30th), and that term is still in use.

As mentioned below, there is traditional belief that some days are lucky (kichijitsu) or unlucky. For example, there are some who will avoid beginning something on an unlucky day.

== Holidays and other notable days ==
=== April 1 ===
The first day of April has broad significance in Japan. It marks the beginning of the government's fiscal year. Many corporations follow suit. In addition, corporations often form or merge on that date. In recent years, municipalities have preferred it for mergers. On this date, many new employees begin their jobs, and it is the start of many real-estate leases. The school year begins on April 1.

=== Rokuyō ===
The rokuyō (六曜) are a series of six days calculated from the date of Chinese calendar that supposedly predict whether there will be good or bad fortune during that day. The rokuyō are commonly found on Japanese calendars and are often used to plan weddings and funerals, though most people ignore them in ordinary life. The rokuyō are also known as the rokki (六輝). In order, they are:

Kanji	Romanization	Symbol	Meaning
先勝	Senshō	◐	Good luck before noon, bad luck after noon. Good day for beginnings (in the morning).
友引	Tomobiki	🆮 (Note: These characters are approved for Unicode 18, to be published in 2026.)	Your friends may be "drawn-in" towards good and evil. Funerals are avoided on this day (tomo = friend, biki = pull, thus a funeral might pull friends toward the deceased). Typically crematoriums are closed this day. But, for instance, weddings are fine on this day.
先負	Senbu	◑	Bad luck before noon, good luck after noon.
仏滅	Butsumetsu	●	Symbolizes the day Buddha died. Considered the most unlucky day. Weddings are best avoided. Some Shinto shrines close their offices on this day.
大安	Taian	○	The most lucky day. Good day for weddings and events like shop openings.
赤口	Shakkō	🟚	The hour of the horse (11 am to 1 pm) is lucky. The rest is bad luck.

The rokuyō days are easily calculated from the Japanese lunisolar calendar. The first day of the first month is always senshō, with the days following in the order given above until the end of the month. Thus, the 2nd day is tomobiki, the 3rd is senbu, and so on. The 1st day of the 2nd month restarts the sequence at tomobiki. The 3rd month restarts at senbu, and so on for each month. The latter six months repeat the patterns of the first six, so the 1st of the 7th is senshō, the 1st of the 12th is shakkō and the moon-viewing day on the 15th of the 8th is always butsumetsu.

This system did not become popular in Japan until the end of the Edo period. The symbols largely fell out of use in the Meiji period, but are still sometimes seen. They are iconic, with black for bad luck and white for good, when arranged from right to left in vertical text.

=== National holidays ===
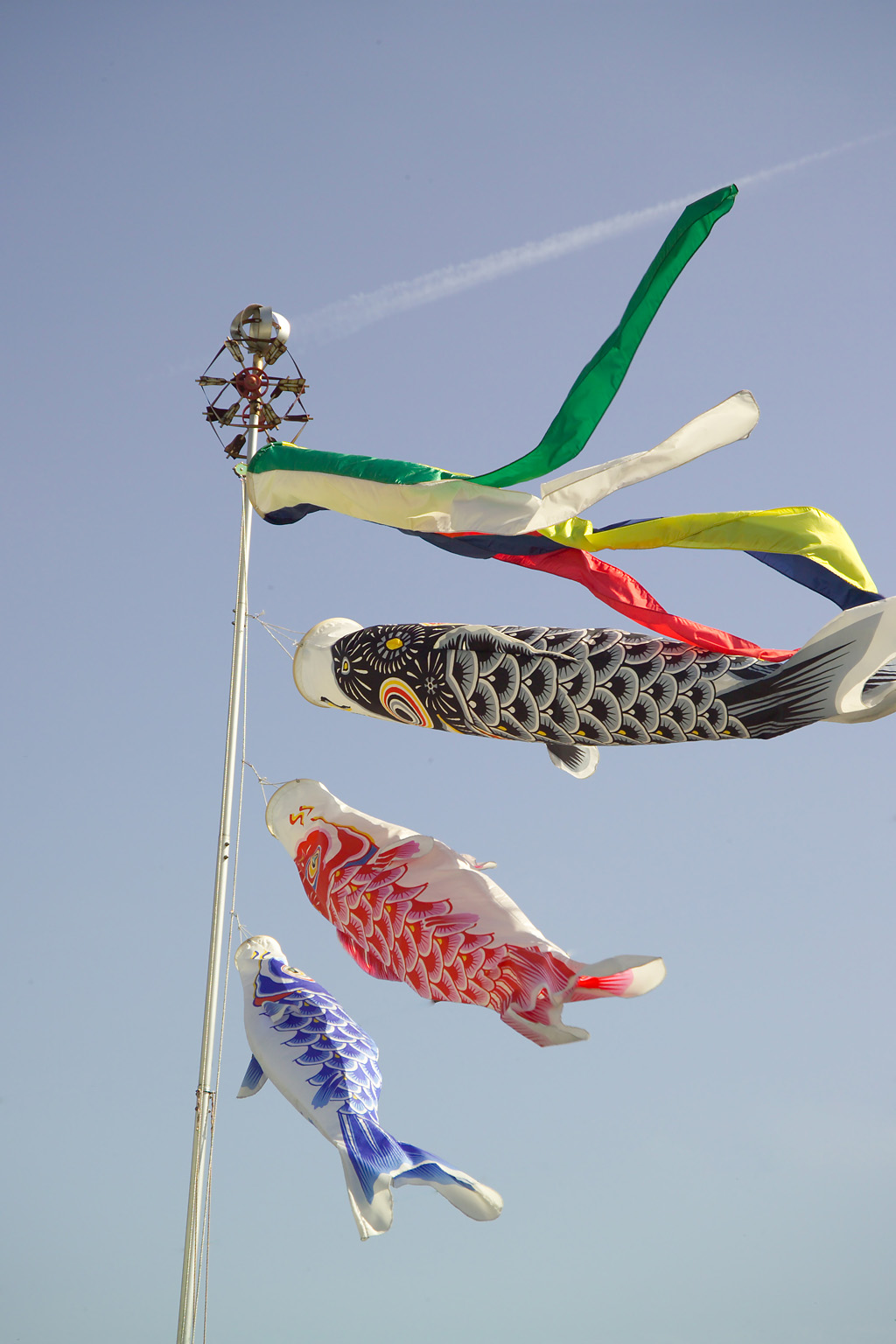
Koinobori, flags decorated like koi, are popular decorations around Children's Day.

After World War II, the names of Japanese national holidays were completely changed because of the secular state principle (Article 20, The Constitution of Japan). Although many of them actually originated from Shinto, Buddhism and important events relating to the Japanese imperial family, it is not easy to understand the original meanings from the superficial and vague official names.

Notes: Single days between two national holidays are taken as a bank holiday. This applies to May 4, which is a holiday each year. When a national holiday falls on a Sunday the next day that is not a holiday (usually a Monday) is taken as a holiday.

Japanese national holidays
Date	English name	Official name	Romanization
January 1	New Year's Day	元日	Ganjitsu
Second Monday of January	Coming of Age Day	成人の日	Seijin no hi
February 11	National Foundation Day^{†}	建国記念の日	Kenkoku kinen no hi
February 23	The Emperor's Birthday	天皇誕生日	Tennō tanjōbi
March 20 or 21	Vernal Equinox Day	春分の日	Shunbun no hi
April 29	Shōwa Day*	昭和の日	Shōwa no hi
May 3	Constitution Memorial Day*	憲法記念日	Kenpō kinenbi
May 4	Greenery Day*	みどりの日	Midori no hi
May 5	Children's Day*	こどもの日	Kodomo no hi
Third Monday of July	Marine Day	海の日	Umi no hi
August 11	Mountain Day	山の日	Yama no hi
Third Monday of September	Respect for the Aged Day	敬老の日	Keirō no hi
September 22 or 23	Autumnal Equinox Day	秋分の日	Shūbun no hi
Second Monday of October	Sports Day	スポーツの日	Supōtsu no hi
November 3	Culture Day	文化の日	Bunka no hi
November 23	Labour Thanksgiving Day	勤労感謝の日	Kinrō kansha no hi

- ^{†} Traditional date on which according to legend Emperor Jimmu founded Japan in 660 BC.
- * Part of Golden Week.

==== Timeline ====
- 1948: The following national holidays were introduced in the Public Holiday Law (国民の祝日に関する法律, Kokumin no Shukujitsu ni Kansuru Hōritsu; lit. 'An Act on public holidays'; Act No. 178 of 1948): New Year's Day, Coming-of-Age Day, Constitution Memorial Day, Children's Day, Autumnal Equinox Day, Culture Day, and Labor Thanksgiving Day.
- 1966: A supplementary provision to create Health and Sports Day was introduced in memory of the 1964 Tokyo Olympics. Vernal Equinox Day, National Foundation Day and Respect for the Aged Day were also introduced.
- 1985: Reform to the national holiday law made days like May 4, sandwiched between two other national holidays, a generic national holiday (国民の休日, kokumin no kyūjitsu).
- 1989: After the Shōwa Emperor died on January 7, his birthday, April 29, was renamed Greenery Day and The Emperor's Birthday (observed as a national holiday since 1868) moved to December 23 for the succeeding Akihito.
- 1995: Reform to the national holiday law added Marine Day, to be celebrated July 20.
- 2000, 2003: Happy Monday System (ハッピーマンデー制度, Happī Mandē Seido) moved several holidays to Monday. Starting with 2000: Coming-of-Age Day (formerly January 15, now the second Monday in January) and Health and Sports Day (formerly October 10, now the second Monday in October). Starting with 2003: Marine Day (formerly July 20, now the third Monday in July) and Respect for the Aged Day (formerly September 15, now the third Monday in September).
- 2005, 2007: April 29 was renamed Shōwa Day, and May 4, previously a generic national holiday (国民の休日, kokumin no kyūjitsu), became the new Greenery Day.
- 2014: Mountain Day was established as a new holiday, to be observed starting 2016
- 2019: Akihito's birthday is December 23; however, he abdicated April 30, 2019, in favor of his son Naruhito, which moved the "Emperor's Birthday" holiday to February 23. Because the transition happened before Akihito's birthday but after Naruhito's, the "Emperor's Birthday" holiday was not celebrated that year.
- 2020: The speech given by Naruhito during the New Year was the first given since 2017, when Akihito halted the practice to reduce his workload.
- 2021, 2022: Because of the COVID-19 crisis, Naruhito's New Year's greetings were delivered via a televised speech instead of in-person.
- 2023: The imperial family's New Year's greetings were held publicly for the first time in three years. The Emperor's Birthday on February 23 will also be the first time public celebrations will be held for the occasion since Naruhito's ascension in 2019. The latter events in 2020, 2021 and 2022 had all been cancelled due to concerns over COVID-19.

=== Seasonal festivals ===
The following are known as the five seasonal festivals (節句, sekku), also known as gosekku (五節句). The sekku were made official holidays during Edo period on Chinese lunisolar calendar. The dates of these festivals are confused nowadays; some on the Gregorian calendar, others on "Tsuki-okure".

1. 7th day of the 1st month: 人日 (Jinjitsu), 七草の節句 (Nanakusa no sekku) held on January 7
2. 3rd day of the 3rd month: 上巳 (Jōshi), 桃の節句 (Momo no sekku) held on March 3 or April 3 depending on the area
  - 雛祭り (Hina matsuri, Girls' Day).
3. 5th day of the 5th month: Tango (端午): mostly held on May 5
  - 端午の節句 (Tango no sekku), 菖蒲の節句 (Ayame no sekku)
  - Boys' Day. Overlaps with the national holiday Children's Day.
4. 7th day of the 7th month: 七夕 (Shichiseki, Tanabata), 星祭り (Hoshi matsuri) held on July 7 in many areas, but in northern Japan held on August 7 (e.g. in Sendai)
5. 9th day of the 9th month: 重陽 (Chōyō), 菊の節句 (Kiku no sekku) almost out of vogue today

Not sekku:

- January 1: Japanese New Year
- August 15: Obon – the date is "Tsuki-okure". In central Tokyo, Obon is held on July 15 (the local culture of Tokyo tends to dislike Tsuki-okure custom)
- December 31: Ōmisoka

== Customary issues in modern Japan ==
=== Gregorian months and the "One-Month Delay" ===
In contrast to other East Asian countries such as China, Vietnam, Korea and Mongolia, Japan has almost completely forgotten the Chinese calendar. Since 1876, January has been officially regarded as the "first month" even when setting the date of Japanese traditional folklore events (other months are the same: February as the second month, March as the third, and so on). But this system often brings a strong seasonal sense of gap since the event is 3 to 7 weeks earlier than in the traditional calendar. Modern Japanese culture has invented a kind of "compromised" way of setting dates for festivals called Tsuki-okure ("One-Month Delay") or Chūreki ("The Eclectic Calendar"). The festival is celebrated just one solar calendar month later than the date on the Gregorian calendar. For example, the Buddhist festival of Obon was the 15th day of the 7th month. In many places the religious services are held on July 15. However, in some areas, the rites are normally held on August 15, which is more seasonally close to the old calendar. (The general term "Obon holiday" always refers to the middle of August.) Although this is just de facto and customary, it is broadly used when setting the dates of many folklore events and religious festivals. But Japanese New Year is the great exception. The date of Japanese New Year is always January 1.

== See also ==
- East Asian age reckoning
- Jikkan Jūnishi
- List of kigo
- Japanese festivals
