= Daijosai =

Japanese imperial ceremony

Daijosai 大嘗祭

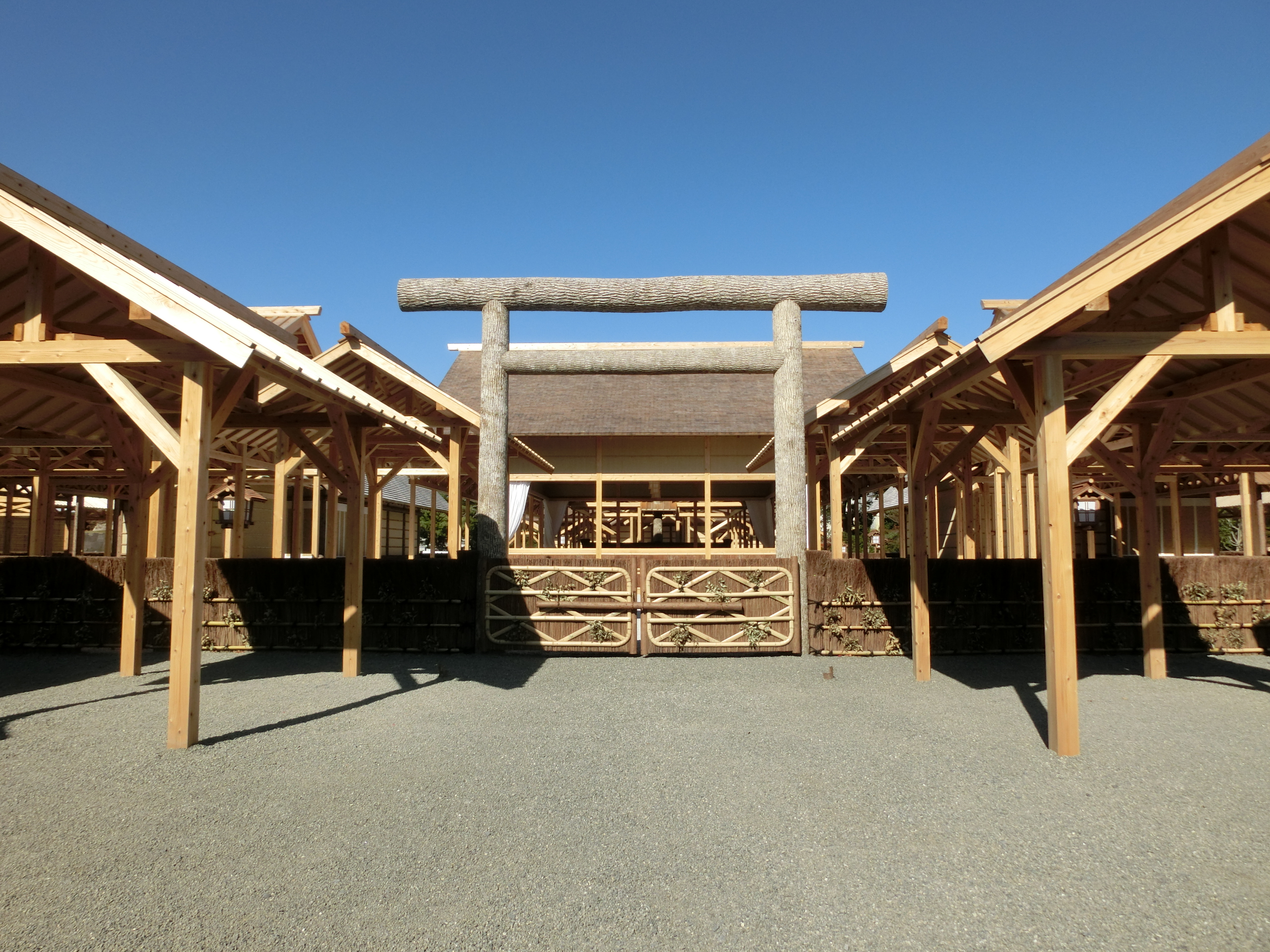
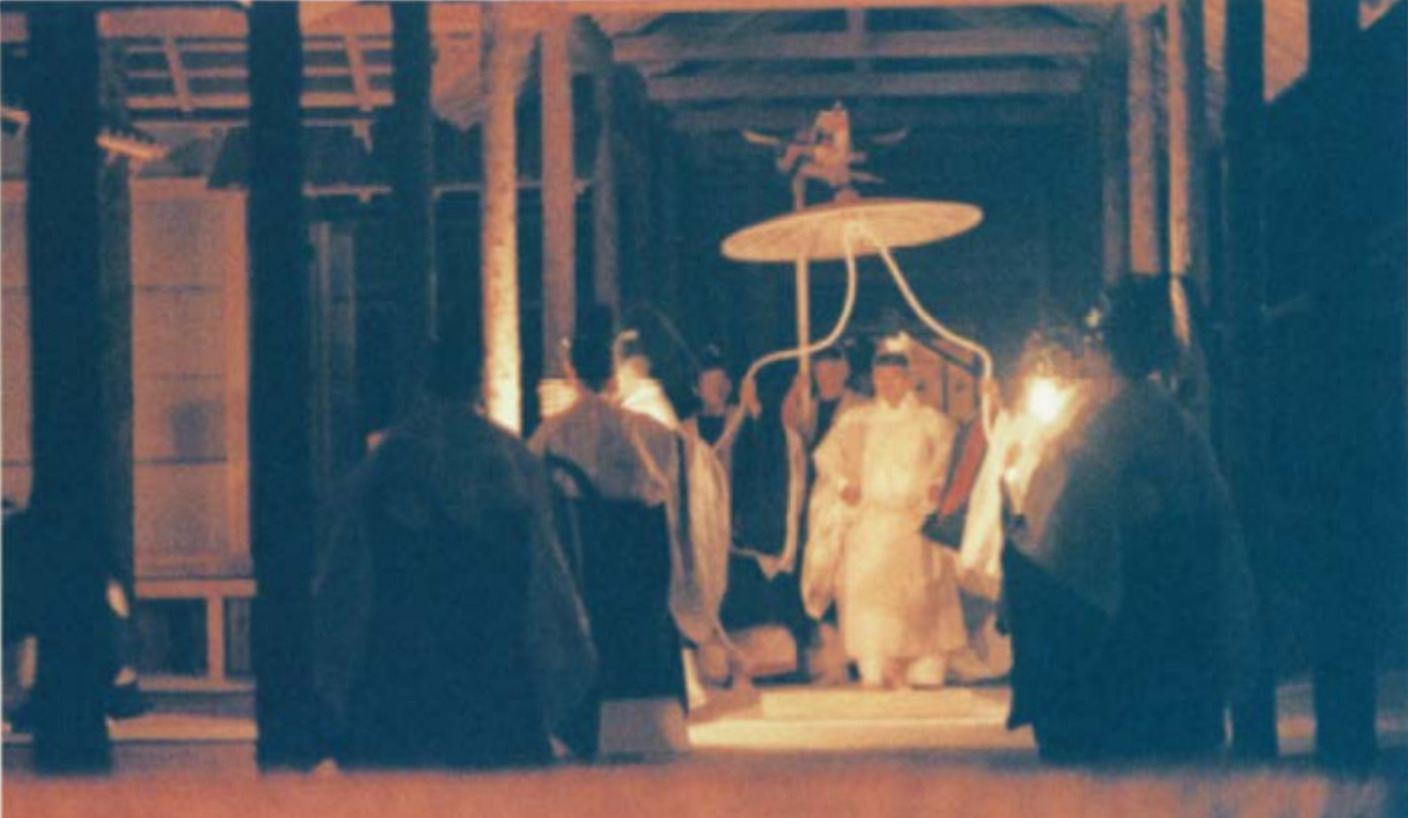
- Top: Daijō-sai of Reiwa (Imperial Palace East Garden); Bottom: The Daijō-sai of Emperor Akihito in 1990
- Genre: Shinto ceremony; Japanese Imperial Rituals; Shinto festivals of the Imperial Court
- Frequency: The first Niiname-no-Matsuri after the Emperor's accession to the throne.; Once in a generation, occurring only once per accession
- Venue: Daijokyu (Sukiden, Yukiden, and Kairyuden)
- Locations: Residence of the Emperor of Japan（Has changed over the ages, currently Tokyo Imperial Palace）
- Country: Japan
- Inaugurated: It is rooted in farming rituals, and its original form is thought to be from around the Yayoi period, and the current scale and style are from the era of Tenmu and Jito. Around (7th century)
- Previous event: 2019 (2022) 14 and 15 November
- Next event: Upon a new Emperor succeeding to the Chrysanthemum Throne
- Attendance: Approximately 730 people in total
- Major events: A ceremony in which the newly enthroned emperor makes an offering to the gods of new grain offered from the east and west of Japan, and eats it himself to pray for a bountiful harvest, peace of mind during his reign, and the well-being of the nation and its people, according to Shinto.
- Patron: Japanese government
- Organiser: Imperial Household Agency
- Website: 宮内庁

The Daijōsai (大嘗祭) is a special religious service conducted in November after the enthronement, in which the Emperor of Japan gives thanks and gratitude for the peace of mind and a rich harvest to the solar deity Amaterasu (天照大神) and her associated deities, and to pray for Japan and its citizens. From a Shinto viewpoint, the emperor is believed to be united with the deity Amaterasu in a unique way and share in her divinity. In general, the Daijosai is considered to be a thanksgiving harvest festival, in the same way as Niiname-sai (新嘗祭) is conducted annually on 23 November, a public holiday of Labor Thanksgiving Day. However, in the year the Daijō-sai is held, the Niiname-sai (新嘗祭) is not held.

The emperor and empress both perform the Daijosai ceremony in November after ascending the throne in a partly televised ceremony and since 2019, a live-streamed event. It is only performed once during their reign. Akihito performed it in November 1990 and Naruhito on 14 November 2019. The emperor offers gifts such as rice, kelp, millet and abalone to the gods. Then, the emperor reads an appeal to the gods, eats the offering, and prays. The emperor and empress perform the rites separately. It takes about 3 hours. Over 500 people are present including the Prime Minister, government officials, representatives of state and private sector firms, society groups and members of the press. It originates as a Shinto rite from at least the 7th century. It is held as a private event by the Imperial Household so that it does not violate the separation of church and state. A special complex with over 30 structures (大嘗宮, daijōkyū) is built for the event. Afterward, they are accessible to the public for a few weeks and then dismantled. In 1990, the ritual cost more than 2.7 billion yen ($24.7 million).

The Daijosai is a highly secret ritual that very few people know the full details of, this has led to controversy with some claiming it violates Women's rights, and Article 20 of the Japanese constitution, which separates religion from government.

== Overview ==
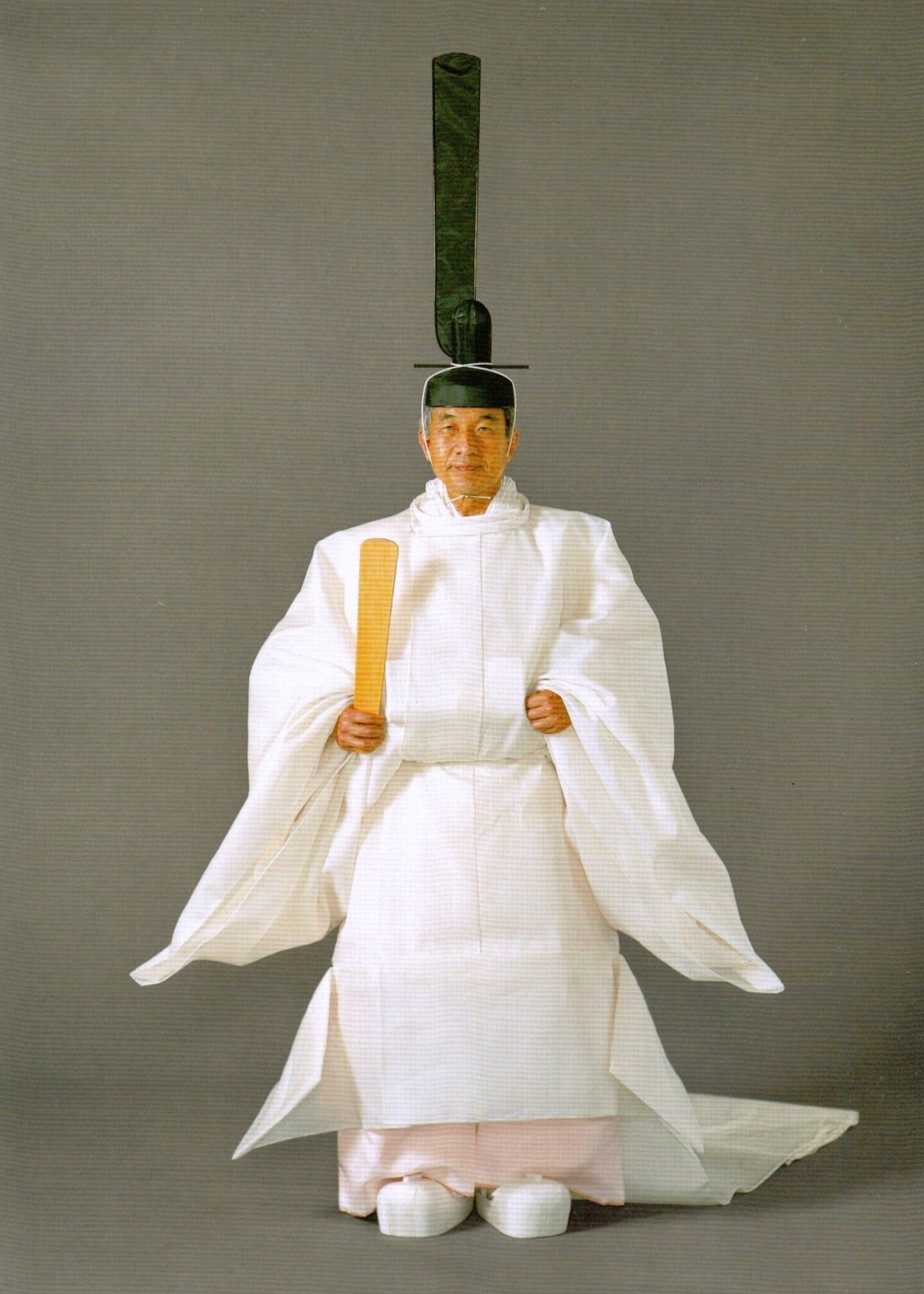
Akihito (the 125th Emperor) wearing the ceremonial robe gosaifuku at the time of the Heisei Daijōsai (1990).

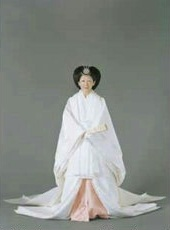
Michiko wearing a white itsutsuginu-karaginu-mo on the occasion of Akihito's Daijōsai in 1990.

In general, like the Niinamesai, the Daijosai is understood as an autumn festival of thanksgiving for the harvest. In fact, there are some similarities in the ritual schedule, and in the same year that Daijōsai is held, Niinamesai is not held. Before the Taihō Ritsuryo, "Daijōsai" and "Niinamesai" were different names for the same ritual.

Since rituals are a secret affair, there have been various discussions about their contents. In the past, the theory of the "bedding over the bedding" advocated by Orikuchi Nobuo, that is, a ritual in which the emperor's spirit is put on the new emperor by reproducing the scene of Amagasaki in Japanese mythology, was proposed. The hypothesis was supported, and research was conducted in the form of development or modification of the hypothesis. In 1983, Okada Seiji sharply criticized this theory, advocating the rite of holy matrimony, and it gained a certain amount of support in the Japanese historical community.

However, from 1989 to 1990, Shoji Okada published an essay that rejected both the "makuro-covered bedding (真床覆衾)" theory and the sacred marriage rite theory. According to Okada Shoji's theory, the Omamesai is a simple ritual in which the new emperor welcomes Amaterasu for the first time, centering on the offering of sacred food and a communal meal ritual. This view, that the emperor enjoys the divine authority of Amaterasu by enhancing the divine authority of Amaterasu, is consistent with the common view before Orikuchi, as well as the view of Middle Ages lords such as Ichijō Kaneyoshi. Okada Shoji also noted that the feast of Omameshi-Matsuri is not only to give thanks for the rice harvest, but also for millet, which was an emergency food for the common people in ancient times, and that Omameshi-Matsuri is a prayer for the stability of the people and the prevention of natural disasters that would disturb agriculture. He opined that it is "a prayer for the calming of nature in mountains and rivers" and "the nation's highest ritual to pray for the peace of the nation and its people".

Later, Masahiro Nishimoto introduced a newly published anecdote from "Nairashiki" and its examination has resulted in the almost complete rejection of both the "mashitoko-covering-bedding" theory and the sacred marriage rite theory by the Japanese historical community.

== History ==
The form of the tamesai (= new tasting rice) ceremony was established in the 7th century during the reign of Empress Kōgyoku, but at that time there was still no distinction between the regular tamesai (= new tasting rice) ceremony and the Jinsō tamesai ceremony. The first time that a ceremony of a different scale was held in addition to the regular Omamesai was during the reign of Emperor Tenmu. However, at that time, it was not yet a once-in-a-generation event associated with accession to the throne, but was held several times during the reign. With the establishment of the Ritsuryo system, the festival was named the "Shansho Otamesai" as a once-in-a-generation ritual, and the details of the ceremony, including the ritual procedures, were also established. Of the ceremonial rites stipulated in the Engi-Shiki, only the Omamesai was designated as a "daisai" (ritual of the Great Taste of Rice). The name "Dajo-e" was derived from the fact that a three-day long festival was held after the tasting of the first taro. Later on, the ordinary tamesai (= new tamesai) was sometimes referred to as "the annual tamesai" and the practice of tamesai as "the tamesai of every generation". Originally, in the Chronicles of Japan, the tame and the new tame were neither referred to as "festival" nor "assembly. They are simply described as "ote" and "shintame. In the Nara period (710–794), they were called "Otame-kai" and "Shintame-kai," and in the Heian period (794–1185), they were officially called "Otamesai" and "Shintamesai," but in most diaries, "Otamesai" and "Shintame-kai" are used. This indicates that one of the most important components of the tasting of taro and the tasting of shin-tame was the "meeting".

However, in the late Muromachi Period and the Sengoku Period, the shogunate was weakened by warfare, and the imperial court became impoverished, which hampered the imperial rites. The tame festival was held until 1466, the first year of Emperor Go-Tsuchimikado's reign, but after the outbreak of the Onin War the following year, it became impossible to collect temporary expenses (tame-kaiyaku). For more than a year, he was forced to abort. In August 1545, Emperor Go-Nara wrote a decree to the Ise Jingu Shrine to pray for the restoration of the imperial family and the people, and at the same time to apologize for the inability to hold the tame-matsuri ceremony.

After domestic stability was restored by the Oryoho regime and the Tokugawa Shogunate, there was a period of time when the tasting of the tithes was not practiced, but Emperor Reigen was intent on reviving the imperial rites, and first restored the rite of the Crown Prince Asahito in 1683, the first time in approximately 340 years. In 1684, the Emperor wished to transfer the throne to the Crown Prince and to restore the Great Tamesai Ceremony, and had the Shogunate negotiate with the Emperor. At that time, he explained in the form of a precedent that the tame-matsuri should be held upon the accession of the crown prince to the throne. The Shogunate, which had been at loggerheads with the Imperial Court due to the Murasaki Incident and other events, was reluctant to request the same ceremonial protocol as in the previous case (when Emperor Reigen ascended to the throne), but after negotiations, the reestablishment was approved on condition that the entire budget for the succession to the throne be paid in the same amount as in the previous case. In 1687, the emperor abdicated and the crown prince acceded to the throne (Emperor Higashiyama), and the Great Taste of Rice Ceremony was held for the first time in 221 years. However, due to budgetary constraints, the reconstruction was a shortened version at this point.

When the next generation Emperor Nakamikado succeeded to the throne, Daijosai was not held. This is attributed to the pledge during the reign of Emperor Reigen. At the time of the succession to the throne of Emperor Sakuramachi, the imperial court initially declined the offer from the shogunate side, but eventually the imperial court side revived Niiname-no-Matsuri. There was an offer, and after negotiations between the imperial courts, the Daijosai was held again in 1738, (Note: From the following year, the Shinmame Festival was also held every year.) three years after the succession to the throne, and after that, the Daijosai was held without interruption every time it was replaced. It came to be done.

From the Nara era to the Heian era of the Heijo, the site for the Taimae Ceremony was the Ryuo-dan garden in the front yard of Chodoin, located in the southern center of the Ouchiura. The first two are the first two. After the burning down of Chodoin at the end of the Heian period, it was still built roughly on the former site of Daigoku-den, under the Ryuo-dan. During the reign of Emperor Antoku, the capital was temporarily relocated to Fukuhara-kyō and was postponed due to the death of Emperor Takakura, but was finally moved to Emperor Go-Shirakawa by the ruling of Emperor Shirakawa. The ceremony was held in 1182 (Juei 1), but due to the current circumstances, including the Genpei War (Genpei War), it was held at Shikikakuden. When Emperor Higashiyama was reestablished, perhaps because the site of Daigoku-den was not yet clear, he followed the precedent set by Emperor Antoku and used the forecourt of Shikikakuden, leading to the Meiji period. In the Meiji period (1868–1912), the accession ceremony was held in Shikikinden, but the tamesai ceremony was held at the Fukiage Palace in Tokyo. During the Taishō and Shōwa eras, the former Sentō Gosho in the Omiya Gosho in Kyoto was used under the "Togoku Order". Since the Heisei era, the ceremony has again been held at the East Gardens of the Imperial Palace in Tokyo.

- During the Edo period, the Emperor decided to follow the old ways and forbid Buddhism Sangha Bhikkhunī to enter the palace and remove the title of successive emperors. Reigen and Regent Ichijō Fuyūketsu (Kaneteru), who opposed the Emperor's brother, Prince Gyōjo, and Minister of the Left Konoe Motohiro Hui and others were at odds with each other. This movement to exclude Buddhism was reinforced each time the new emperor held the first Grand Tasting Ceremony, in conjunction with the rise of Kokugaku and the theory of the reverence for the emperor, which led to criticism of the long-established court practice of shimbutsu shugō and to debates about the pros and cons of the exclusion of Buddhism and its attendant enthronement ceremony. Some believe that it developed into a distant cause of the Separation of Shinto and Buddhism at the Imperial Court in the Meiji period.
- In the Ōei Taimeikai (Records of the Great Tasting Ceremony) written by Ichijō Tsunetsugu in the Muromachi period, it is written that "The national event is the Taimeikai, and the event is no more than a Shinto meal", and in the Eiwa Taimeikai, it is written that only the emperor and his attendants may enter the temple (Taimekiya). However, in the historical background of the period when young emperors between the ages of two and seven continued from Emperor Horikawa to Emperor Antoku and Emperor Go-Toba, we can see "Nigyo" and "Gode" in Oe Masafusa's "Eke Yadai" and "Enkei Datame Ki" and "Go-Toba" in the "Enkei Datame Ki" and "Go-Toba". If the emperor was 10 years of age or older (an adult who had reached the age of full age), as described in the "Oei Taiteki," the emperor himself offered the "Nigyo" service, and if the emperor was 9 years of age or younger, the regent offered the "Gode" service. In addition, a few days before the Omame-sai, a preliminary ritual of the offering of the offering of the offering of the offering of the food to the gods is held.
- The ceremonies related to the coronation ceremony were designated as national events, while the ceremonies related to the Daijosai were designated as imperial events. It is often misunderstood that "imperial event" here does not mean "private event of the imperial family" but "public event of the imperial family". The budget for Daijosai is extraordinary, other than the usual court fees. According to the government announcement (final answer) at that time, the reason why Daijosai was not regarded as "state affairs" is that the emperor's "state affairs" under the Constitution of Japan requires "advice and approval of the Cabinet". This is because the Daijosai, which is a traditional ritual of the imperial family, does not fall under the category of "state affairs."

== Details ==
First, two special rice paddies (斎田, saiden) are chosen by turtleshell divination (亀卜 kiboku) and purified by elaborate Shinto purification rites. The families of the farmers who are to cultivate the rice in these paddies must be in perfect health. Once the rice is grown and harvested, the rice is divided into two storehouses, the takakaya no mikura (高茅御倉) for the majority of the rice, while the best of it is stored in the inamiden (稲美殿), which is regarded as a de facto Shinto shrine and its stored rice as its go-shintai (御神体), the embodiment of a kami or divine force. Each kernel must be whole and unbroken, and is individually polished before it is boiled. Some sake is also brewed from this rice. The two sets of rice seedlings now blessed each come from the western and eastern prefectures of Japan, and the chosen rice from these is assigned from a designated prefecture each in the west and east of the country, respectively.

Two thatched roof two-room huts (悠紀殿 yukiden, lit. East-region hall) and (主基殿 sukiden, lit. West-region hall) are built within a corresponding special enclosure, using a native Japanese building style that predates and is thus devoid of all Chinese cultural influence. The Yukiden and Sukiden represent the east and west halves of Japan, respectively. Each hall is divided into two rooms, with one room containing a large couch made of tatami mats at its center which serves as a seat for Amaterasu, in addition to a seat for the emperor and a place to enshrine the kami; the second is used by used by ritual officials and the sword and jewel of the Imperial regalia are placed there. All furniture and household items also preserve these earliest, and thus most purely Japanese forms: e.g., all pottery objects are fired but unglazed. These two structures represent the house of the preceding emperor and that of the new emperor. In earlier times, when the head of a household died his house was burned; before the founding of Kyoto, whenever an emperor died his entire capital city was burned as a rite of purification. As in the earlier ceremony, the two houses represent housing styles from western and eastern parts of Japan. Since 1990, the temporary enclosure is located at the eastern grounds of the Imperial Palace complex.

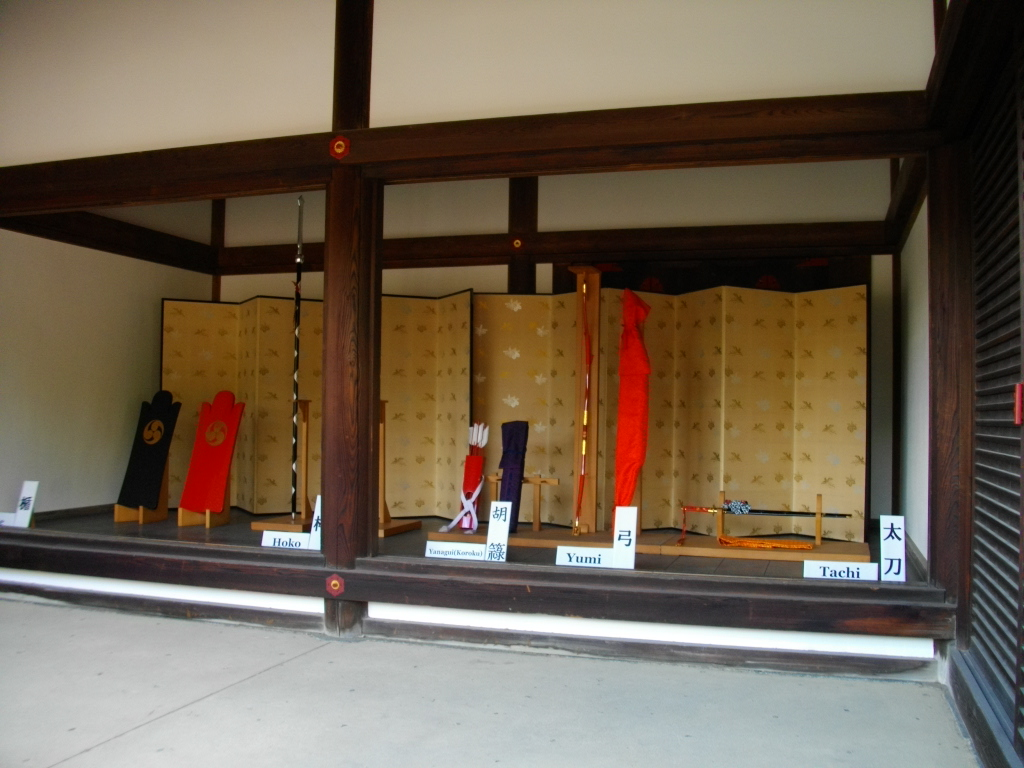
Ritual items from the enthronement of the Japanese emperor

== Ceremony day ==
This ceremony, also known in archaic Japanese as Oo-ni-e-matsuri (大嘗祭) and Oo-name-matsuri (大嘗まつり (大嘗祭) is marked as an Imperial court ritual performed by the Emperor of Japan upon his succession to the throne, and is an Imperial Household Ritual. In olden times, it was also called "Ohonimatsuri" or "Ohonamatsuri". In modern times, however, it is read phonetically as "Daijosai".

=== Ritual purification ===
The Jingiryō (神祇令) (Note: The section of these codes where matters on Shinto affairs are ruled upon.) of the Taihō and Yorō codes stipulate that the purification period for the Daijōsai consists of one month's time of minor ritual purification (散斎 araimi) and 3 days worth of intense ritual purification (致斎 maimi). During araimi, the Emperor can perform his duties as normal, except for punishing criminals, listening to music, signing judgements on black warrants, mourning, inquiring about illness, or engaging in impure activities. During maimi, all activities other than Shinto ritual are suspended entirely. At the Daijōsai of Emperor Go-Toba in the first year of the era Genryaku (1184CE), the kengyo (検校, inspector of the activities) at the time, Nakayama Tadachika, began purification at his own residence on the eleventh day of the eighth month. It is thought that Nakayama began earlier than usual due to his service as kengyo, and also the precedent of the Daijōsai being suspended in the third month, which occurred before the early Heian period. Tadachika himself stated that "araimi is required before the eleventh month, and maimi is required after the eleventh month", pointing to Tadachika planning a gradual strengthening of the programme of ritual purification. The twenty-third of the eighth month was a Buddhist ember day (斎日 saijitsu), and although fish was prepared to eat on the tray, he did not actually eat it. Nakayama inquired with Urabe no Kanetomo about how to handle the matter, and received guidance that fish was acceptable even on the saijitsu. Furthermore, while he ceased personal Buddhist practice, he could not entirely remove it from the household.

=== Before the Daijōsai proper ===
In early August, purification commissioners (大祓使 ōharaeshi) are chosen by divination for the Ukyo (the capital west of the Suzaku-ōji), Sakyo (the capital east of the Suzaku-ōji), the Kinki prefectures, and the prefectures of the seven circuits to perform an extraordinary ōharae (greater purification) in each as preparatory to the Daijosai. In late August, a second round of purification commissioners were appointed and performed ōharae again. After this, offerings were made to the prefectural Amatsukami and Kunitsukami, as well giving offerings to Jingū. Further, an Imperial ritual address (告文 kokubun) was delivered. Until the 1880s, the commissioners were chosen for the provincial level, as well as the offerings to the gods and spirits were directed to those of the provincial lands. Since 1990, the capital Ukyo and Sakyo divisions for the purification correspond to the areas of the Tokyo city proper north and south of the intersection of Uchibori Street, where the Imperial Palace is located, and Babasaki Street, the road leading to the front gate of the palace, and Western Tokyo itself west of the city core proper and the city's Pacific offshore islands, and the mainland prefectures of the Kanto region surrounding the capital, took over the duties historically connected with Kansai.

In late October, the Emperor performs misogi in the Kamo river. From the middle Edo period onward, this was performed at the Seiryoden, during the Taishō and Shōwa eras at the Kogosho of the Kyoto Imperial Palace, and in the Take-no-ma of Kyūden of Tokyo Imperial Palace for the Heisei and Reiwa eras.

Throughout November, a simple ritual abstinence (散斎 araimi) is to be observed, and for three days before the Daijōsai proper a very strict ritual abstinence (致斎 maimi) is observed, prohibiting contact with anything ritually impure at all. The ritual sites (斎場 saijō) of Yuki-no-kuni and Suki-no-kuni were established, and buildings set up for the preparation of shinsen, nihonshū, and ritual items. Upon the completion of construction, the ōtonomatsuri (大殿祭) was held to pray for the avoidance of natural disasters, and the mikadomatsuri (御門祭) to ward off malignity.

The day before the Daijōsai, as with the annual Niinamesai, the Chinkonsai (鎮魂祭) (Note: When referring to that held for the Emperor of Japan specifically, this can also be pronounced as mitama no shizume) is held. The Niinamesai and Daijōsai are considered exceptionally spiritually taxing, and pose the risk that the Emperor's soul will separate from his body due to the stress, so the Chinkonsai is a prophylactic Shinto ritual to appease the Emperor's soul and prevent this; kagura is offered also.

=== Preparatory procedure ===
Preparation for the ceremony begins at 10:00, when a procession of 5,000 people leaves temporary accommodations to enter the Daijōkyū, arriving at 14:00, and offerings and ritual items are carried in. At this time, ritual gate guards (衛門 emon) are posted at the four shinmon (神門) gates of the inner shibagaki fence. In addition, ceremonial courtiers (威儀の者 igi no mono) are posted at the Igimono no aku buildings in front of the south shinmon. At the time the emon and igi no mono assume their postings, the Emperor's ritual officials (掌典職 shōtenshoku) enshrine the deity seats of the main halls. At around 19:00, secular attendees such as the Prime Minister of Japan will arrive.

=== Ceremony at the Kairyūden and rice threshing ===
At 20:00, the Emperor leaves the Imperial Residence and proceeds to the Daijōkyū, entering the Kairyūden. This is the beginning of the Kairyūden no gi (廻流殿の儀). The Emperor enters the oyuden (御湯殿) within the Kairyūden and puts on an unlined robe (帷 tobari), before entering the ritual bath (小忌の御湯 Omi no onyu) and then divesting, before exiting and drying with a second tobari. The Emperor is then given a poultice (御河薬 okawayaku) (Note: A substance similar to mineral deposits found in hot springs, put on the hands and then rinsed off like handwashing.) and washes it off his hands. He then puts on the white ritual dress (御祭服 gosaifuku).

Simultaneously, rice threshing (稲舂 inetsuki) where the court ladies (采女 uneme) pound the rice with a mortar and pestle, takes place in the ritual kitchens (膳屋 kashiwaya), accompanied by the performance of rice-threshing songs (稲舂歌 inetsuki uta) with tanka lyrics about each region written new for each Daijōsai. However, this rice threshing is pro forma, as the rice for ritual use has already been threshed. At this time, the chief ritual officer (掌典長 shōtenchō) reads norito in the Yukiden and Sukiden, while other ritual officers present the offerings from the remainder of Japan (机代物 tsukueshiromono) in front of the Yukiden. Since the Showa era, the Empress of Japan will also enter the Kairyūden and vest in a white itsutsuginu-karaginu-mo

At 21:00, the Emperor exits Kairyūden and heads to the Yukiden, passing under the covered corridor (雨儀御廊下 ugi no orōka). At this time his kasa is changed, and his path is illuminated by tallow candles (脂燭 shisoku). The pathway is laid with wooden planks, topped by white cloth and reed mats. However, just before the Emperor passes, a reed mat of makomo is prepared, and unrolled to allow chamberlains carrying the Ame no Murakumo no Tsurugi and Yasakani no Magatama, the Emperor, and the chamberlain holding the train of gosaifuku to pass, before being rolled up again. This path that appears only when the Emperor passes by is called goendō (御筵道). A special umbrella is held over the sovereign's head, in which the shade hangs from a phoenix carved at the end of the pole and prevents any defilement of his sacred person coming from the air above him. The Emperor then takes his seat in the outer room (外陣 gejin) of Yukiden, while the Imperial regalia are placed on a table in the gejin. This table is counted as a deity seat. The Japanese Crown Prince and the male members of the Imperial Family then sit in the omiakusha (小忌幄舎) in front of Yukiden. Afterwards, the Empress enters the chōden (幄殿) in front of Yukiden, while the female members of the Imperial Family enter the dengai omiakusha (殿外小忌幄舎) between Yukiden and Sukiden. This participation of the females in the Imperial Family began in the Taisho period, with both buildings newly added to account for their presence.

At the same time, further attendees enter. Since the Heisei period, everyone enters around the time of Kairyūden no gi.

- Imperial Household Agency officials lead 12 of the Kuzu (Kunisu) from Yoshino and 12 flute makers from Nara.
- The prefectural governors of the Yuki-no-kuni and Suki-no-kuni enter, accompanied by delegations of poets.
- Saeki no sukune enters leading 15 hereditary narrators (語部 kataribe).
- The Crown Prince of Japan and other officials enter. At this time, a Hayato makes a dog noise in the distance. (Note: A sound resembling the distant howl of a dog. A remnant of this exists in the call made when the shite (principal actor of a Noh performance) takes their place.)

After entering, each group holds its own performance. Since the Heisei Daijōsai, these have been taken up by the Imperial Household Agency music department.

- The Kuzu perform an archaic song.
  - In the 19th year of the reign of Emperor Ojin (288 CE), the Kuzu offered the Emperor music as tribute during a visit to Yoshino, and since then continued to make offerings of agricultural goods and archaic offerings, which continues presently.
- The folk songs of Yuki-no-kuni and Suki-no-kuni are performed. (Note: Each one is performed according to the respective custom.)
  - The lyrics of each are unique to the region, and are considered to be congratulatory songs (寿歌 hogiuta) from the Kunitsukami of the region.
- The kataribe recite poetry in an archaic style.
  - The poems are congratulatory messages (寿詞 yogoto) of the prefectural governors. Since archaic times, governors of the former Japanese provinces were seen as representatives of the Kunitama-no-Kami (国魂神) of the region; thus, these are considered congratulatory messages from the Kunitama-no-Kami of each region. Since the Heisei era it has not been carried out.
- Hayato-no-tsukasa (隼人司) enters with representatives of the Hayato people.
  - The Hayato people are an ancient folk supposedly descended from the progeny of Hoderi no Mikoto, and so this is considered a recreation of an ancient culture. This has not been done since the Heisei period.
- At this point, the Japanese Crown prince and others perform an eightfold kashiwade (拍手). (Note: When pronounced as hakushu, this is the Japanese word for applause. When pronounced as kashiwade this refers to Shinto ritual handclapping.) The kashiwade of the Imperial family is followed by that of the regular attendees. Since the Taisho era, female members of the Imperial Family have also participated, with the Empress going first.

=== Procession of the offerings ===
At 21:30 Japan Standard Time, the procession of offerings (神饌行立 shinsen gyōryū) to the Yukiden begins. The offerings that the Emperor will personally present to the gods, as well as paraphernalia, are carried to the Yukiden by shōtenshoku and ritual assistant court ladies (采女 uneme).

- Two ritual assistants (掌典補 shōtenho) carry wax tapers (脂燭 shisoku)
- A shōten carries a kezurigi (削木) (Note: A ritual wooden sceptre made of shaved wood, with a profile similar to a whip)
- A shōten carries the ebinohataraibune (海老鰭盥槽). This is a vessel used to receive the poured water at the time of ritual temizu, and is so named because its handles resemble shrimp fins.
- A shōten holds the tashiraka (多志良加). This is a vessel used to pour the water for the temizu.
- Baizen uneme (陪膳采女) (Note: The first of the two uneme who directly assist the Emperor during the ritual. Baizen uneme directly assists the Emperor.) carries in the onkatanabako (御刀子筥) which contains items used during the rinsing of the mouth for temizu, including toothpicks, straw, and a small wooden knife.
- Shindori uneme (後取采女) (Note: The second of the two uneme who directly assist the Emperor during the ritual. Shindori uneme assists Baizen uneme and sometimes the Emperor.) takes the ontanagoibako (御巾子筥) which contains a six-shaku bolt of hemp cloth intended for drying the hands after temizu.
- An uneme carries the mat to be put underneath the offerings of food to the gods (神食薦 kamisugomo). (Note: A mat woven from bamboo like a sudare with white fabric edging)
- An uneme carries the mat to be put underneath the Emperor's portion of the offerings (御食薦 misugomo). (Note: The construction is analogous to that of the kamisugomo.)
- An uneme carries the ohashibako (御箸筥) which contains six sets of bamboo hashi for use in serving the shinsen.
- An uneme carries the onhiratebako (御枚手筥). This box contains 40 oak leaves for use in making hirade (Note: This is a Shinto ritual item used as a plate made from oak leaves.) which are used in lieu of vessels. (Note: The Eiwa Daijōkai-ki, a record of the Daijōsai of Emperor Go-Enyu, states that the reason elaborate vessels are not used is 'frugality from the custumal of the age of the gods'; however, Shinto scholar Yasue Kazunori argues that this is not the case, but much rather that this is a custom indigenous to Japan, using as a reference a passage from the Kojiki concerning Emperor Ojin where oak leaves were reportedly used during a Shinto rite.)
- An uneme carries the omonobako (御飯筥). This is a box containing rice and millet steamed over a ritually pure fire (忌火 imibi) started using a flint. The rice, already ceremonially threshed and washed for cooking, is the one that was delivered from the selected prefectures that were assigned to grow the rice early in the year.
- An uneme carries the namamonobako (鮮物筥), a box of fresh seafood. It contains red sea bream with salt, squid, vinegared abalone, and salmon.
- An uneme carries the karamonobako (干物筥), a box of dried seafood. It contains steamed abalone, bonito, dried red sea bream, and horse mackerel.
- An uneme carries the onkonomibako (御菓子筥). It contains dried jujube, fresh chestnuts, kachiguri (搗栗, Japanese pounded and dried chestnuts), and dried persimmon.
- A shōten carries steamed abalone in stock broth (蚫汁漬 awabi no shiru), which is seasoned with greenfleece.
- A shōten carries a broth of pickled seaweed (海藻汁漬 me no shiru) which is also seasoned with greenfleece.
- Two shōtenho carry in empty cups (空盞 kouzan) (Note: This word can also be read as sakazuki, but these are distinct from such.) for use in serving the awabi no shiru and me no shiru.
- Two shōtenho carry in the on-atsumono-hassokuzukue (御羹八足机), an eight legged table (八足机 hassokuzukue) used to serve soup.
- Two shōtenho carry in the miki-hassokuzukue (御酒八足机), an eight legged table used for serving nihonshū, made from part of the rice harvested and sent to the Imperial Palaces.
- Two shōtenho carry in the okayu-hassokuzukue (御粥八足机), an eight legged table used for serving kayu.
- Two shōtenho carry in the on'naorai-hassokuzukue (御直会八足机) used for the Emperor to have naorai (直会). (Note: This is a Shinto post-ritual feast. Usually it is held with shrine parishioners and everyone eats together, but in this case the Emperor alone eats.)

The offered food is representative of the prefectures of eastern Japan.

When the shōten carrying the kezurigi reaches the door of the Yukiden, a keihitsu (警蹕) (Note: A Shinto ritual vocalisation of the sound of the extended ode vowel used to express the movement of a deity. Usually performed when a honden's doors are opened or closed or a mikoshi is being brought out.) is chanted. This signifies that the offerings themselves are being regarded as deities. At the sound of the keihitsu, the Emperor moves to the inner room (内陣 naijin) of Yukiden and takes his seat there; when the offerings have finished being brought in and prepared, the shōten with kezurigi stands at the south front of the Yukiden as an indication, and the gagaku musicians of the Imperial Household Agency in the gakusha pavilion to the east of the Yukiden, seeing this as the signal, begin the continuous performance of kagura music. Until the Emperor comes back out of the room, the music is not stopped. At this time the two mats are placed at the direction of the Grand Shrine of Ise, and the Emperor takes his position and seats to begin the offerings and consecration of the gifts.

=== Ceremony inside the Yukiden ===
After the Emperor has already been seated in the naijin of Yukiden, facing the empty mat used as a deity seat, to music of the gagaku, the misugomo and kamisugomo are laid out and the offerings placed upon them; at this point, only baizen uneme and shindori uneme are allowed in the naijin. With everything having been adequately prepared, the Emperor performs temizu for ritual purification, with the two uneme pouring water from the tashiraka into the ebinohataraibune, and the Emperor cleans his mouth using the implements in onkatanabako. Having ritually purified, the Emperor takes the sets of hashi from onhashibako and, in accordance with archaic customs, places the requisite number of each offering in a hirade from the onhiratebako and arranges it; this action is called shinku (親供). (Note: The prefix of the character 親 meaning 'parent' in this case denotes an action where "the Emperor personally performs the action". For example, the ceremony where the Emperor personally awards the Order of Culture is called 親授式 shinjushiki.) Offerings such as rice, millet, abalone, squid, and chestnut, as well as the sake, are presented by the Emperor to the kami of Eastern Japan and the gods using hirade on the kamisugomo, consecrating them to the heavens as holy gifts. This process takes around 80 to 90 minutes overall (Note: The NHK documentary The Japanese People and the Emperor (aired 30 April 2019) included a recreation of the ceremonies in the Yukiden. According to the program, the Emperor performs shinku over the course of 90 minutes, arranging the offerings using 32 hirade made from oak leaves.) in the naijin room. After the Emperor finishes arranging all of the offerings on the hirade, everyone rises from their seats, and the Emperor is presened and then reads a ritual proclamation to the gods and kami (called the 御告文 otsugebumi), praying for the nation and presenting to the gods the gifts of food, soup and sake from the people of the country. After reading the otsugebumi paper, the Emperor takes some of the offerings that have been apportioned on the misugomo and eats them himself in naorai in the presence of those in attendance. The dinner of the tithes and consecrated offerings is therefore considered an act of divine communion that consummates his singular unity with Amaterasu-ōmikami, thus making him (in Shinto tradition) the intermediary between Amaterasu and the Japanese people, government and nation, as head of state.

After the Emperor eats the portion of the misugomo, the uneme finish serving the offerings and then withdraw them (Note: Allowing offerings to sit for a while to be 'used' before withdrawing them is standard ceremonial protocol). After another temizu, the uneme leave Yukiden, the Emperor returns to the Kairyūden, and the gagaku music is stopped as he leaves. The order of both processions is identical to those when they entered. At this time, it is about 00:00 JST. The secular attendees such as the Prime Minister, seated in akusha, will depart at this time. The Emperor will then repeat these rituals in the Sukiden from 02:00 to 05:00 the next day, but with the food presented to the Emperor for offering to the gods and kami representing Western Japan this time around. In the Heian period, the Emperor did not return to the Dairi that night, but instead waited at the Daigokuden until the break of morning. After all the rituals are completed, the deity seats and mats are removed.

The significance of the offerings and the ceremonial dinner of the tithes is as an act of thanksgiving to Amaterasu and Tenjin Jigami, the ancestors of the Emperor, and as a prayer for the nation and its people's peace, prosperity, and good harvests in his reign. Since 1990, after the promulgation of the current constitution, the offerings also are a reflection of the humanity and humility of the Emperor before the gods in praying for the nation, and the offerings are also reflective of the country's economy especially in agriculture and fisheries, the basic lifeblood of the land before industrialization.

== Controversies of the Daijosai ==
=== Relationship to the Constitution's principle of separation of church and state ===
Some members of the public, including Christian and Buddhist officials, are of the opinion that government spending on the Omameshi-Matsuri and the participation of prefectural governors in the Omameshi-Matsuri are unconstitutional due the Constitution's principle of a separation of church and state. Some Constitutional lawsuits have been filed from the viewpoint of this separation of church and state, but all the lawsuits have been dismissed. These plaintiffs were defeated due to the judgment that the expenditure of state funds did not disadvantage the plaintiffs and that the governors' attendance did not violate the separation of church and state in light of the purpose-effect standard of the separation of church and state

According to the decision of the Japanese Supreme Court in July 1977, "The separation of church and state in the Constitution does not mean that the state is not allowed to have relations with religion at all, but that it is not allowed when it is deemed to exceed reasonable limits. It does not allow the state to have relations with religion at all, but only in cases where such relations are deemed to exceed reasonable limits." This is one of the reasons why the government has approved the expenditure of government funds for the Omameshigai. However, in 1995, the Osaka High Court rejected the plaintiff's lawsuit, stating that "the tasting of the Heisei era has already been completed and the plaintiff is not disadvantaged," but in a side argument, the court pointed out that "the suspicion of a violation of the Constitution cannot be denied in general."

On 10 December 2018, 241 plaintiffs filed a lawsuit against the government in the Tokyo District Court seeking an injunction to stop the government from spending money and compensation for damages on the grounds that the implementation of the "Rei (retirement)", "Sokui-no-rei (enthronement)", and "Taitei-Matsuri (tasting of rice)" ceremonies following the abdication of Emperor Akihito and accession of Crown Prince Naruhito, under the provisions of the Special Act on the Imperial Household Law concerning the Abdication of the Emperor, violates the Constitutional provision stipulating separation of church and state.

=== Expenses and facilities ===
==== Opinions of the Emperor and members of the Imperial Family ====
Emperor Shōwa reportedly told his aides that they should save and accumulate the money for the inner court.

Nobuhito, Prince Takamatsu once suggested, "Why don't we just do it at the Three Palace Sanctuaries, where the annual Niinamesai is held, without building a large daijokyu?"

If Prince Fumihito Akishino were to become emperor, he has proposed a plan similar to that of Prince Takamatsu, that the expenses for the Daijosai be paid from the national budget, and that they be covered by the expenses of the Imperial Court by utilizing the Shinkaden, a smaller building near the Three Palace Sanctuaries used for the ordinary Niinamesai.

==== Budget, construction, and changes in the Reiwa era ====
The government and the Imperial Household Agency followed the precedent of the Heisei era and spent money from the national budget, but changed the roof of the daijokyu, which had previously been thatching, to shingles, and reduced expenses by building some facilities such as the kashiwaya (kitchens for the offerings of food to be prepared in) in reinforced concrete under the premise that it was acceptable as long as it didn't alter the rituals or serve as an impediment to them. The original planned construction cost of the daijokyu was 1.97 billion yen, actually in 2019 (the first year of the 2025 Shimizu Corporation won the bid for 957 million yen, 60% of the planned price, in a competitive bidding process held at the Imperial Household Agency on 10 May 2019.

On the occasion of the Heisei Daijosai, the East Gardens of the Imperial Palace were completely closed as an anti-terrorist measure during the construction of the Imperial Palace, due to the active anti-emperor extremist movement at the time, and once completed, the main buildings were covered with large protective tents of extremely solid construction, and four 2,500-liter Fire prevention tanks and fire pumps were installed in four locations. In contrast, the East Palace Garden was not closed during the 2019 Daijosai, and the construction of the daijokyu was open for all to see, in order to "deepen the public's understanding of the expenditure of national funds for the Daijosai." It was also decided that after the Daijosai, the daijokyu would remain open to the public as it had been during construction, and that materials would be reused after dismantling.

== See also ==
- Saiten
- Festival of the Deva and Naraka
- Sacrifice to Taishan
- Secular Games

== Gallery ==
Daijosai

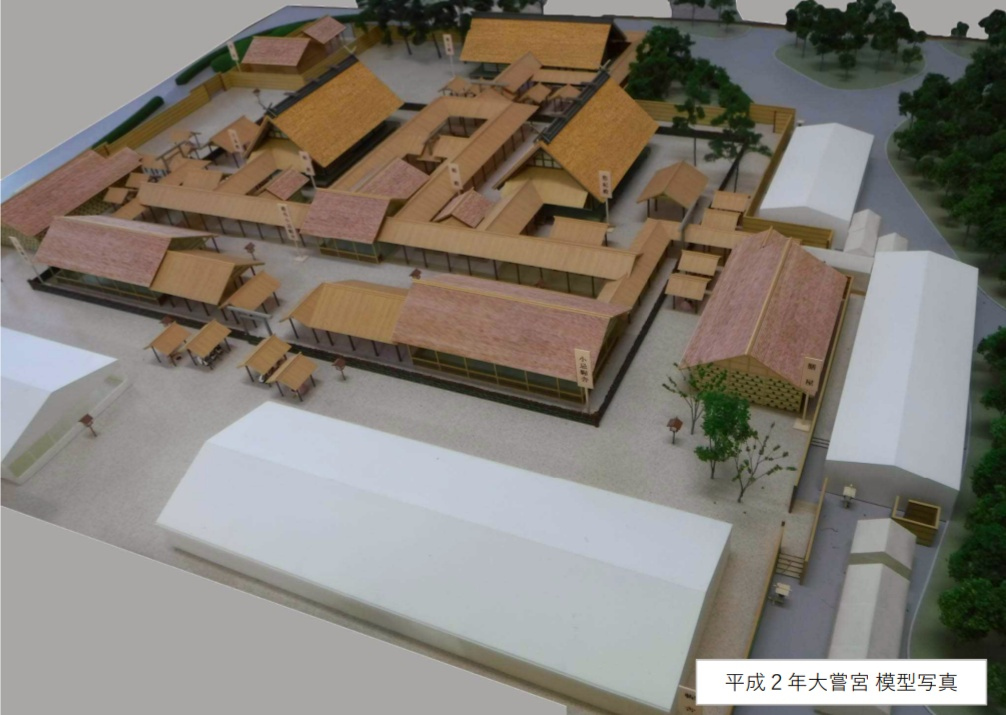
Scale model of the Heisei era daijokyu, built in 1990

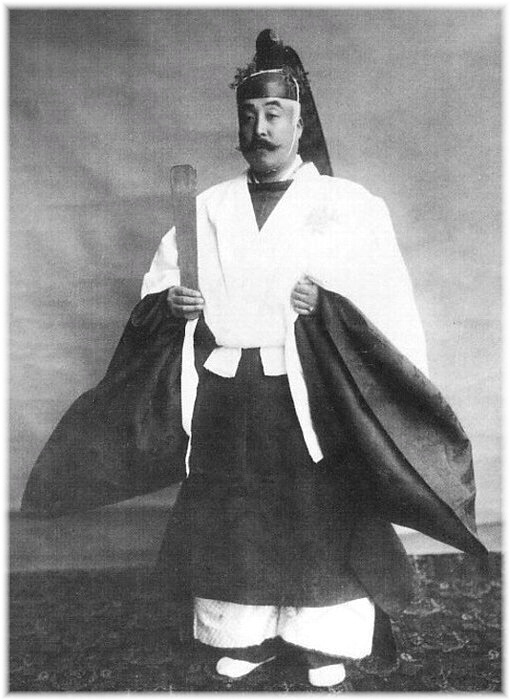
Prince Nashimoto Morimasa at Emperor Taishō's ceremony

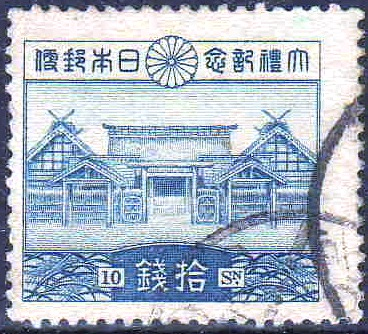
The daijokyu, where the festival was held, depicted on a postage stamp commemorating the Emperor Showa's accession and Daijosai.

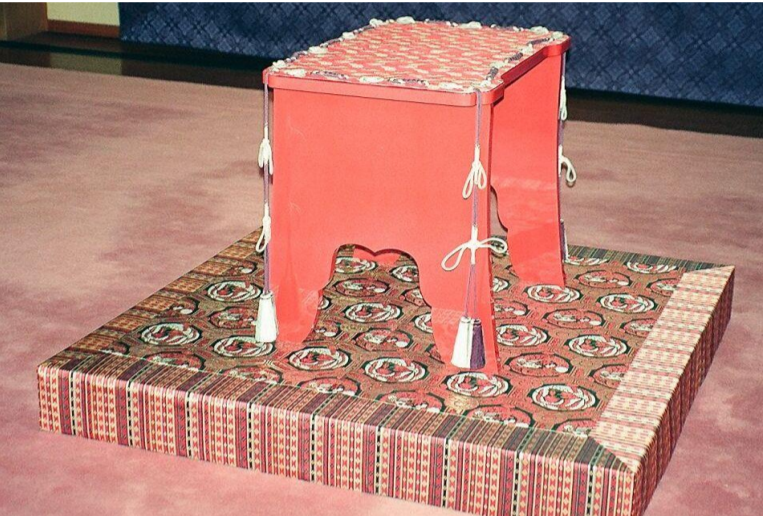
A table in red lacquer for holding the sword and jewel of the Imperial regalia

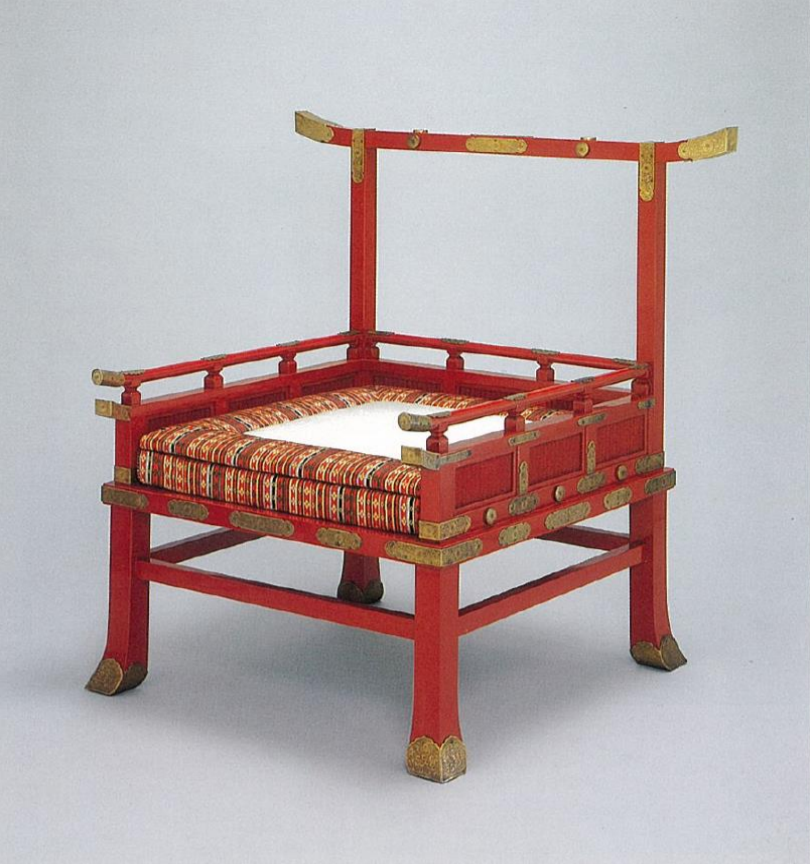
Imperial throne
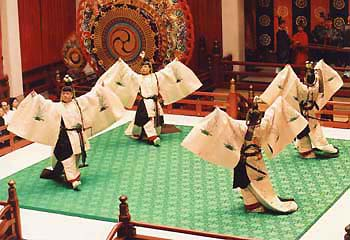
Traditional dancing of eastern Japan, performed during the rituals in the Yukiden.

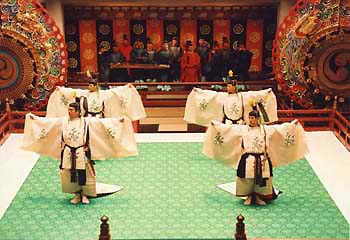
Traditional dancing of western Japan, performed during the rituals in the Sukiden.

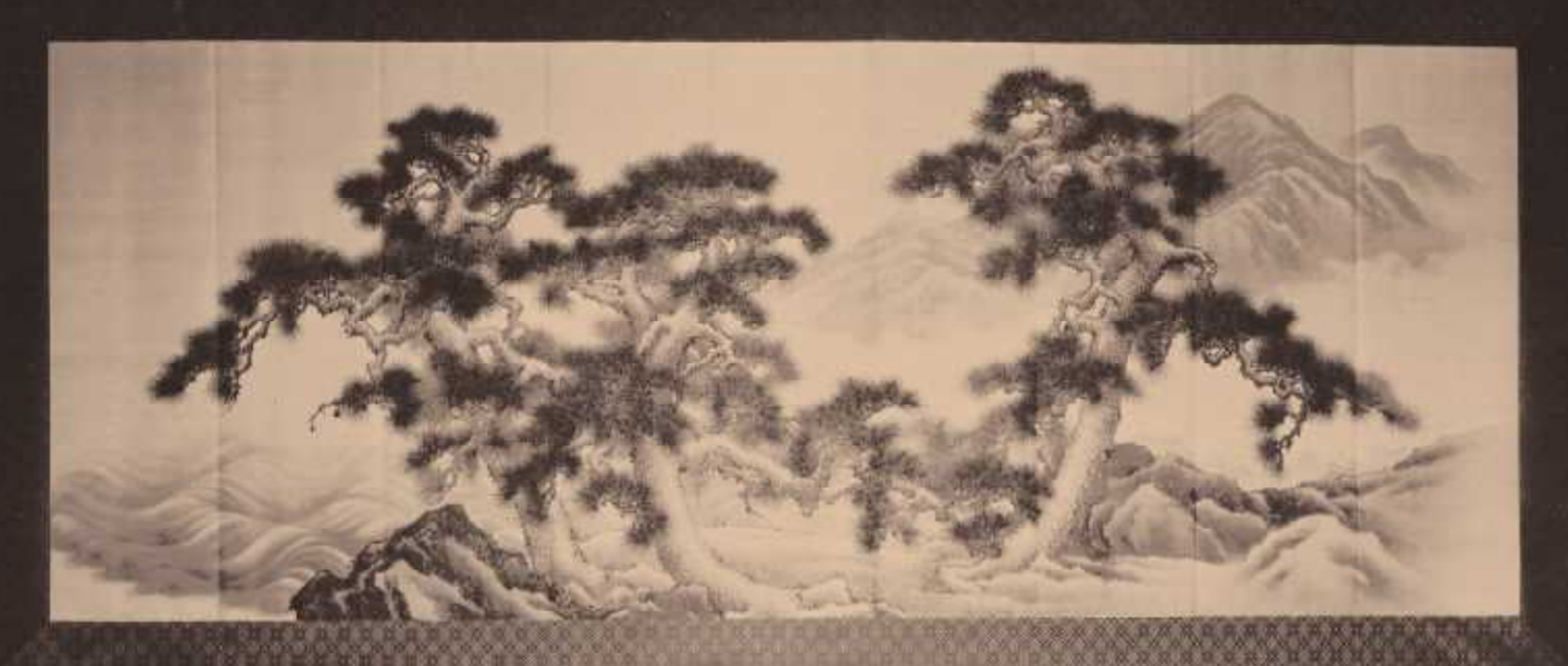
Kinshitsu Kakusa (from the Showa Tairekiroku)

== Bibliography ==
- 田中初夫『践祚大嘗祭』木耳社、1983年
- 岡田精司編『大嘗祭と新嘗』学生社、1979年、復刊1989年（特に折口信夫「大嘗祭の本義」）
- 折口信夫『古代研究II 祝詞の発生』中公クラシックス、2003年。上記を収録
  - 『古代研究III 民俗学篇3』角川ソフィア文庫、2017年。上記を収録
  - 『大嘗祭の本義 民俗学からみた大嘗祭』森田勇造現代語訳、三和書籍、2019年
- 吉野裕子『天皇の祭り』講談社学術文庫、2000年
- 岡田荘司『大嘗祭と古代の祭祀』 吉川弘文館、2019年3月 ISBN 978-4-642-08350-8
- 加瀬直弥 (25 July 2019). "中世の大嘗祭". 季刊 悠久 (158). 東京都千代田区: おうふう. ISSN 0388-6433.
- 福羽美静 (1895). 硯堂叢書. 八尾書店.
- 鈴木暢幸、小松悦二 (1915). 御即位式大典録 後編. 御即位大典紀念会.
- 大礼記録編纂委員会 (1931). 昭和大礼要録. 内閣印刷局.
- 鎌田純一 (2003). 即位禮・大嘗祭 平成大禮要話. 錦正社. ISBN 4-7646-0262-8.
- 加茂正典 (25 July 2019). "古代の大嘗祭". 季刊 悠久 (158). 東京都千代田区: おうふう. ISSN 0388-6433.
- 小倉慈司・山口輝臣 (2018). 天皇の歴史９：天皇と宗教. 講談社学術文庫. 講談社. ISBN 978-4065126714.
- 武田秀章 (25 July 2019). "近現代の大嘗祭". 季刊 悠久 (158). 東京都千代田区: おうふう. ISSN 0388-6433.
- 古相正美 (25 July 2019). "大嘗祭の中絶と復興". 季刊 悠久 (158). 東京都千代田区: おうふう. ISSN 0388-6433.
- 真弓常忠 (2019). 大嘗祭. ちくま学芸文庫. ISBN 978-4-480-09919-8.
- 真弓常忠 (April 2019). 大嘗祭の世界 新版. 学生社. ISBN 978-4-311-80128-0.
- 安江和宣『大嘗祭神饌御供進儀の研究』神社新報社、2019年5月。ISBN 978-4-908128-23-3
