= Saeki =

Saeki may refer to:

== Places ==
- Saeki, Okayama, a former town in Wake District, Okayama, Japan
- Saeki District, Hiroshima, a former district in Hiroshima, Japan
- Saeki-ku, Hiroshima, a ward of the city of Hiroshima, Japan

== Other uses ==
- Saeki (surname), a Japanese surname
- Saeki people of ancient Japan
