= Imperial Palace East Garden =

Gardens in Tokyo Imperial Palace, Japan

- 皇居東御苑
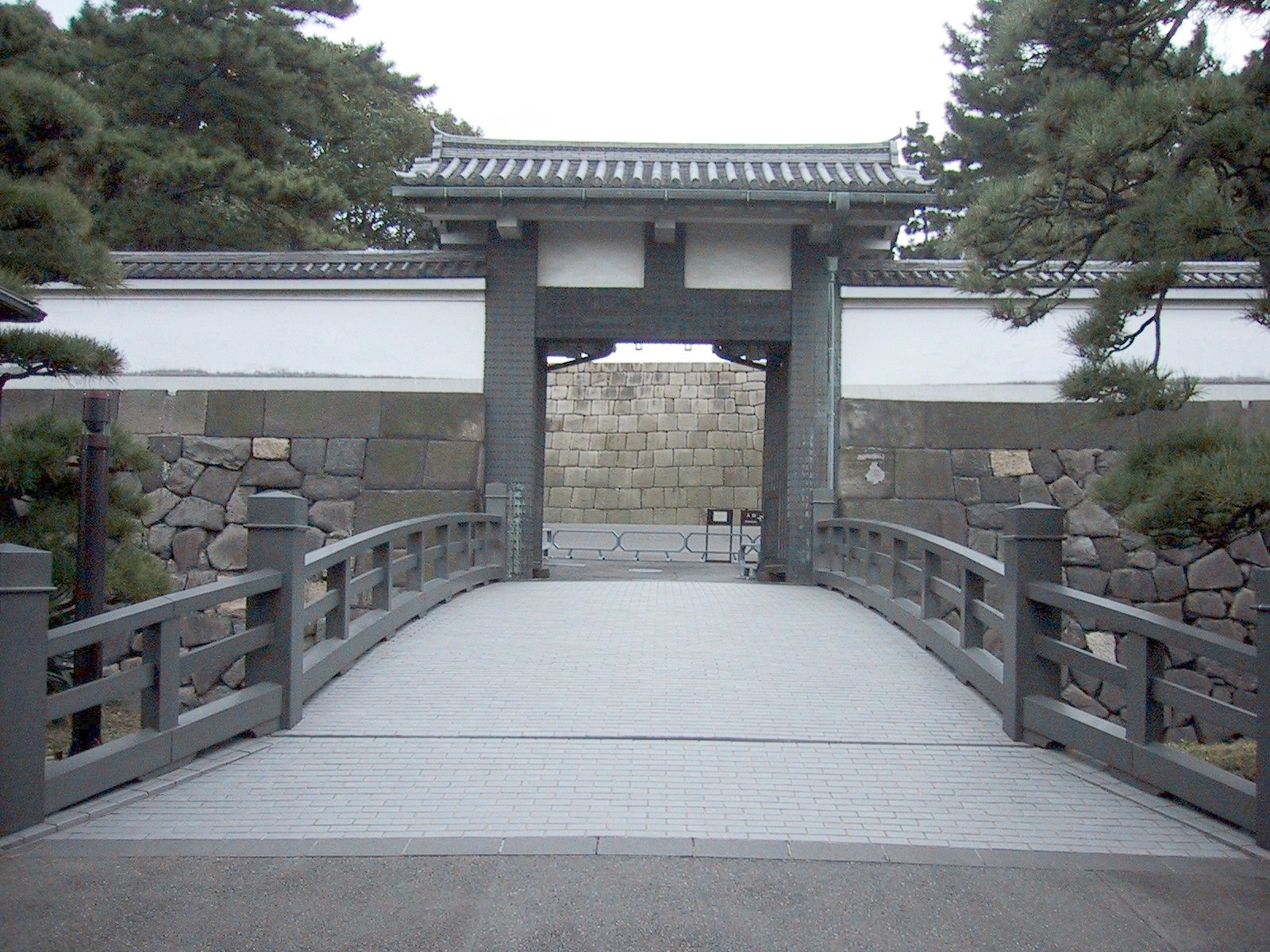
- A gate in the Honmaru area
- Interactive map of the Imperial Palace East Garden area

General information
- Location: 1-1 Chiyoda, Chiyoda City, Tokyo 100-8111, Japan, Chiyoda, Tokyo, Japan
- Coordinates: 35°41′15″N 139°45′27″E
- Year built: 1961–1968 (modern garden)
- Opened: October 1, 1968
- Management: Imperial Household Agency

Technical details
- Size: 21 ha (52 acres)
- Grounds: Edo Castle (ruins), Tokyo Imperial Palace (modern)

Website
- https://www.kunaicho.go.jp/e-event/higashigyoen02.html

The Imperial Palace East Gardens (皇居東御苑, Kōkyo Higashi Gyoen) is a historical garden in the Tokyo Imperial Palace. The gardens were first used by the Tokugawa shogunate.

There is a bridge which leads to Sakashita-mon gate nearby is the Imperial Household Agency building and Tokyo Imperial Palace (or "kyuden")

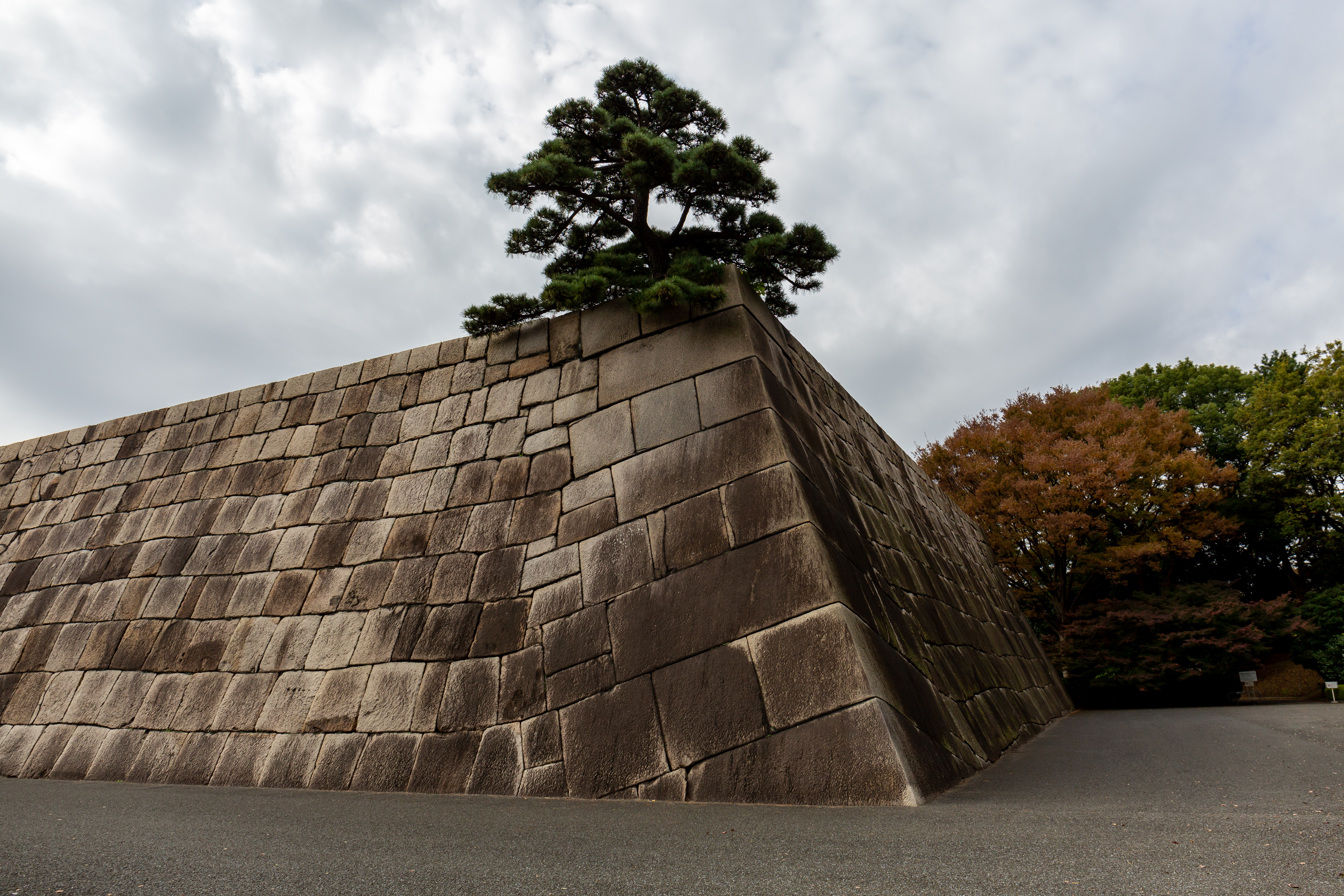
The ruins of Edo Castle

The garden was built on the grounds of Edo Castle. The Ōte-mon Gate functioned as the main gate of Edo Castle. It was used by the feudal lords who came to stay in the castle under the alternating attendance system of the Tokugawa shogunate, and as such it was a very important gate. All the gardens areas were used as defence. They are translated as "inner circle of defense" (honmaru), "second circle of defense" (ninomaru), and "third circle of defense" (sannomaru). Suwa-no-cha-ya was built by Emperor Meiji in 1912 and is a tea house. Emperor Meiji lived in the Nishinomaru palace near the gardens from 1869 to 1873.

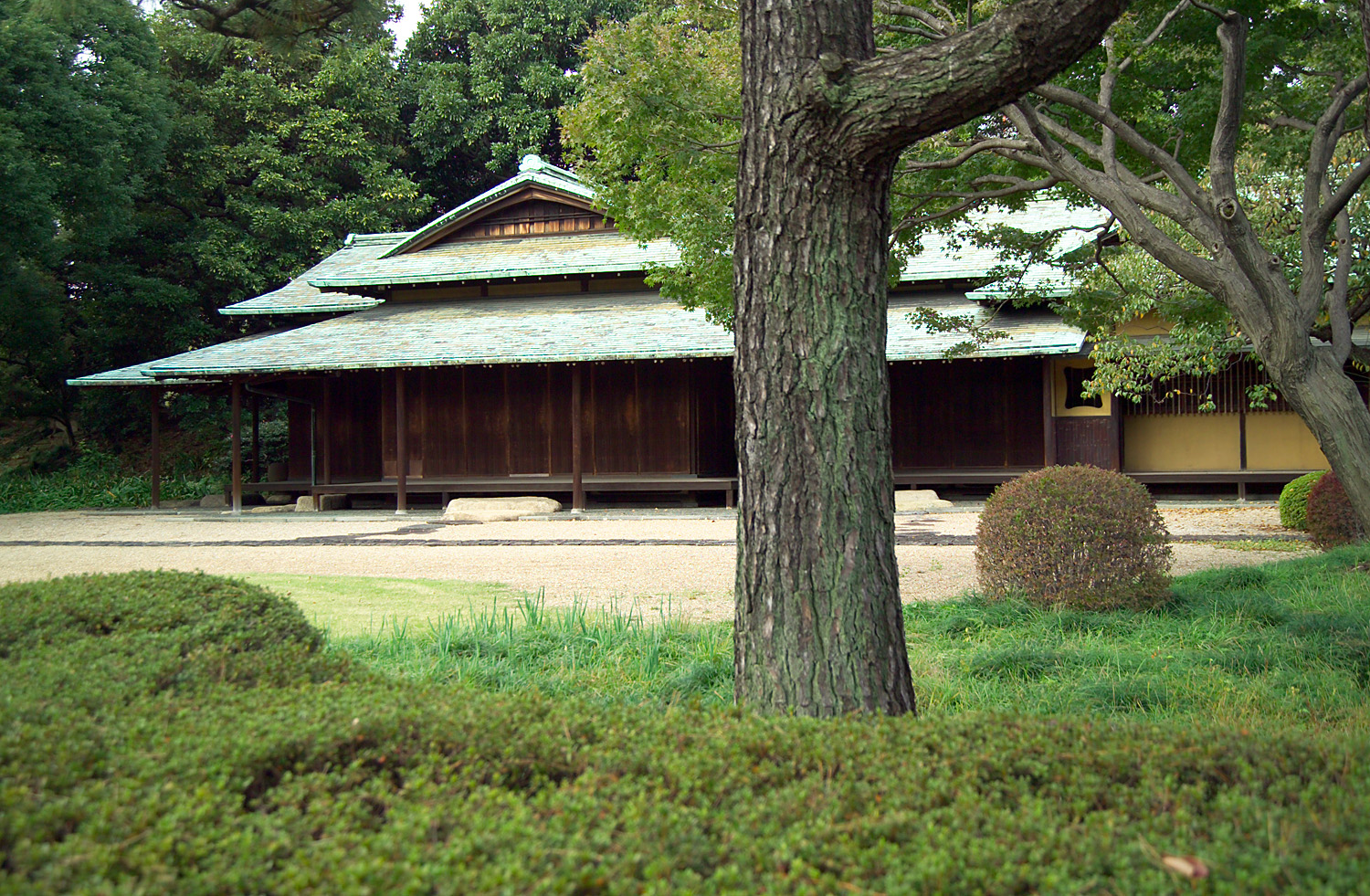
Suwa no Chashitsu (諏訪の茶室), a tea house

== Historic construction ==
The gardens were first built under the Tokugawa shogunate, but it was not a garden. Originally, it was built as more of a palace. Typically, the heir to the shogun lived here. It is not other than that about the historical construction, but we know that it was destroyed multiple times. Today, the ruins of Edo castle are here.

== Construction of the garden ==
The building of the modern gardens began in 1961. The garden is over 210,000 square metres (2,300,000 sq ft). The garden was completed in 1968, and was opened on October 1 that year. It is open to the public unless needed for court purposes or public holidays. The Toukagakudo (Imperial Concert Hall) and Sannomaru Shozokan (Museum of the Imperial Collections), and other buildings housing the Imperial Household Agency's Music, Archives and Mausolea departments, are located within this garden.

== Honmaru area ==
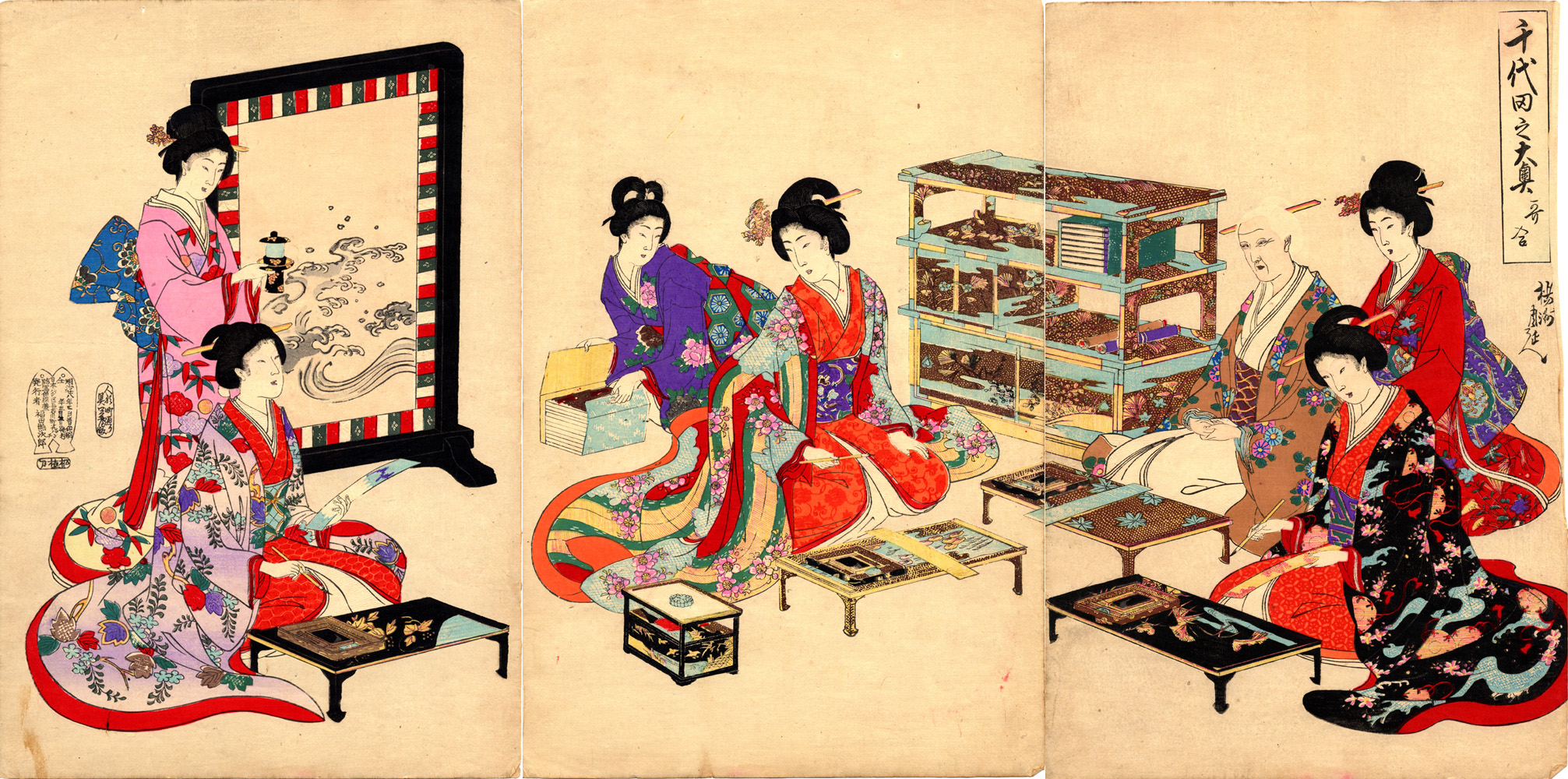
The Ōoku (women's quarters) in the Honmaru

The Honmaru (本丸) area includes the remains of Edo castle's main tower, and lawns, trees and flowers. This was the luxurious innermost part of the palace and the shōgun's main residence. It was destroyed twice, in 1657 and again in 1863. Honmaru palace was also here and was one story high. It included the Ōoku, which was the women's quarters. During the Tokugawa shogunate, concubines and consorts lived here. They did things like play, eat, sleep, give pleasure to the shogun, and more. Surrounding the Honmaru were curtain walls, with 11 keeps, 15 defense houses and more than 20 gates. The area was destroyed by fire and reconstructed several times. The keep and main palace were destroyed in 1657 and 1863, and not reconstructed. Some remains, such as the Fujimi-yagura keep and Fujimi-tamon defense house, still exist. Apparently, the main keep was the biggest in Japan, although only the base remains.

== Ninomaru area ==
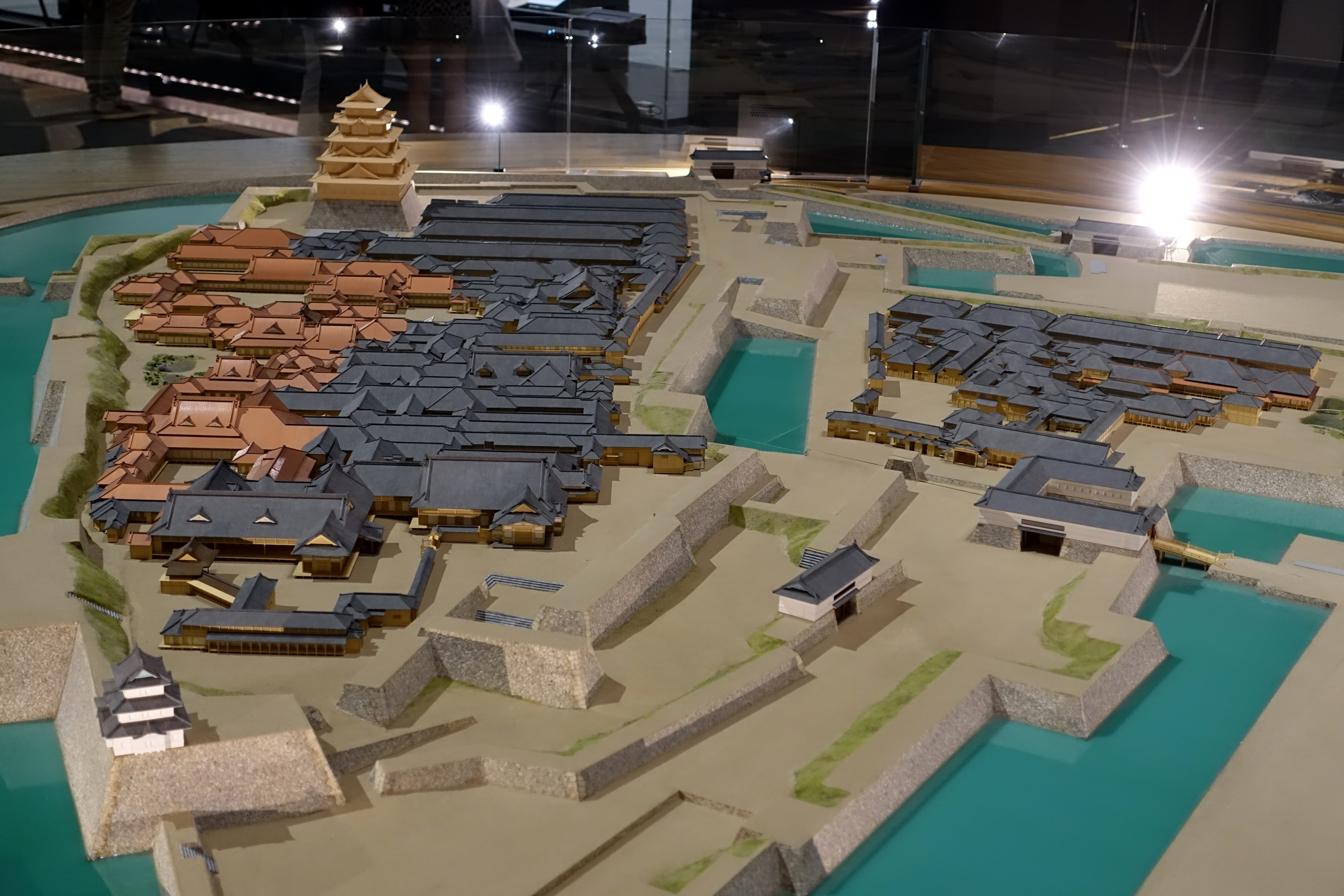
A museum depiction of the Honmaru/Ninomaru in the Edo period

The Ninomaru (二の丸) area features trees representing all the prefectures of Japan. There is a slope called Bairin-zaka, the Ninomaru garden, Ninomaru grove, and an iris garden. Under the Tokugawa shogunate, the Ninomaru area was made as a place for heirs, and a palace for them to live. Several fires burnt the palace and especially this area. People tried rebuilding it up until the Meiji era.

== Sannomaru area ==
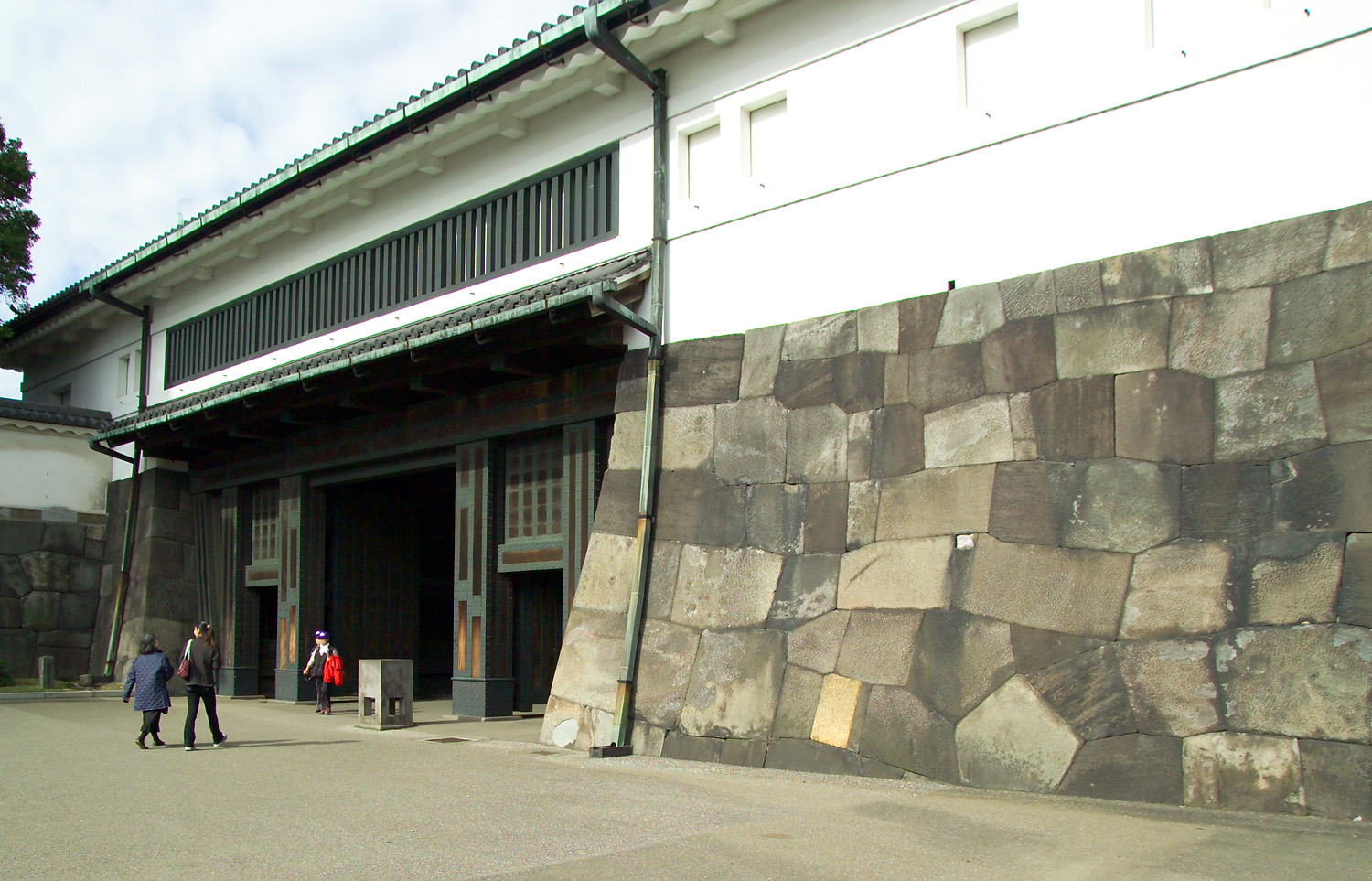
Ōte-mon, the main gate under the Tokugawa shogunate

The Sannomaru (三の丸) area consists of a museum, the Sannomaru shozokan (the museum of imperial collections). It is also a resting place. During the reign of Shōgun Tokugawa Hidetada, the palace underwent repairs and Ōte-mon (大手門) gate (located here) was made the main entrance. During the aerial raids of the Pacific War, the Ōte-mon was burnt down, but later was repaired.
