= Saeki (surname) =

Saeki (written: 佐伯, 冴木 or サエキ in katakana) is a Japanese surname. Notable people with the surname include:

- Anna Saeki (冴木 杏奈), Japanese singer
- Hikaru Saeki (佐伯 光, born 1943), Japanese admiral
- Hinako Saeki (佐伯 日菜子, born 1977), Japanese actress
- Hiroshi Saeki (佐伯 博司, born 1936), Japanese footballer
- Iori Saeki (佐伯 伊織, born 1994), Japanese singer and voice actress
- Kasumi Saeki (佐伯 霞, born 1996), Japanese boxer
- Kazumi Saeki (佐伯 一麦, born 1959), Japanese novelist
- Kozo Saeki (佐伯 幸三, 1912–1972), Japanese film director
- Miho Saeki (佐伯 美穂, born 1976), Japanese tennis player
- Naoya Saeki (佐伯 直哉, born 1977), Japanese footballer
- P. Y. Saeki (1871–1965), Japanese scholar
- Tomo Saeki (サエキ トモ, born 1973), Japanese voice actress
- Yuzo Saeki (佐伯 祐三, 1898–1928), Japanese painter

== Fictional characters ==
- Kayako Saeki (佐伯 伽椰子), a character in the film series Ju-on
- Sayaka Saeki (佐伯 沙弥香), a character in the anime Bloom Into You
- Takeo Saeki (佐伯 剛雄), a character in the film series Ju-on
- Toshio Saeki (佐伯 俊雄), a character in the film series Ju-on
- Tatsuya Saeki (冴木 タツヤ), a character in the anime "Vivy: Fluorite Eye's Song"
