= Red seabream =

Common name for several species of fish

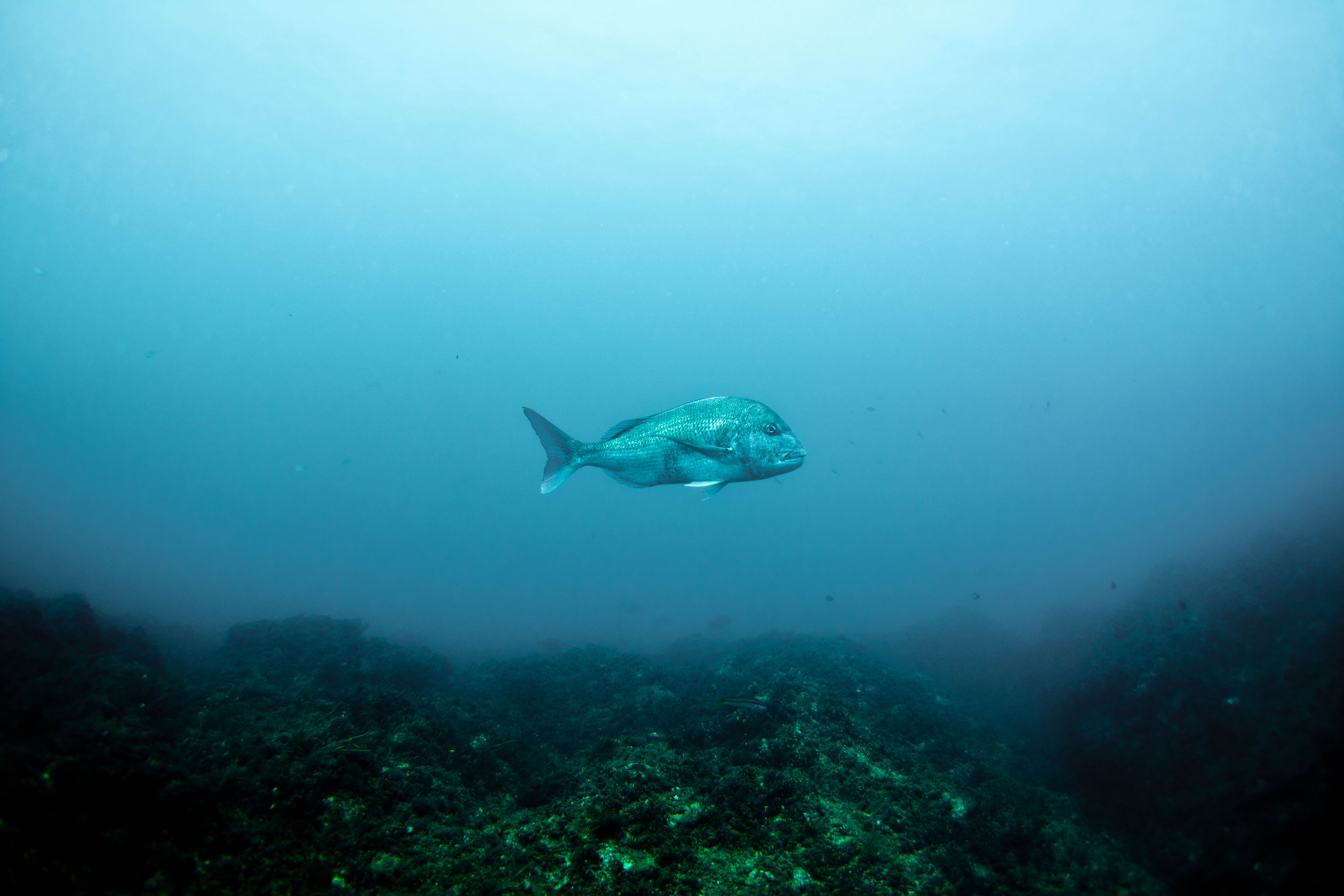
P. major in the waters near Yamagata Prefecture, Japan

Red seabream is a name given to at least two species of fish of the family Sparidae:

- Pagrus major
- Pagellus bogaraveo, also called the blackspot seabream
