= Saeki people =

People of ancient Japan

The Saeki (佐伯) were a people of ancient Japan, believed to have lived on Honshū in the area between the modern regions of Kantō and Hokuriku.
