= Sarumino =

Anthology

Sarumino (猿蓑, Monkey's Raincoat) is a 1691 Japanese anthology, considered the magnum opus of Bashō-school poetry. It contains four kasen renku as well as some 400 hokku, collected by Nozawa Bonchō and Mukai Kyorai under the supervision of Matsuo Bashō. Sarumino is one of the Seven Major Anthologies of Bashō (Bashō Shichibu Shū), and, together with the 1690 anthology, Hisago (The Gourd), it is considered to display Bashō's mature style (Shōfū) at its peak. Bashō's influence on all four of the kasen in Sarumino was profound and when he sat with Bonchō, Okada Yasui and Kyorai at Yoshinaka Temple to write "Kirigirisu", he extolled them, "Let's squeeze the juice from our bones."

== Contents ==
- Preface by Takarai Kikaku
- Hokku
  - Book 1: Winter (94 hokku)
  - Book 2: Summer (94 hokku)
  - Book 3: Autumn (76 hokku)
  - Book 4: Spring (118 hokku)
- Book 5: Kasen
  - Tobi no ha mo (Kite's Feathers), by Kyorai, Bonchō, Bashō, Fumikuni
  - Machinaka wa (Town Center), by Bonchō, Bashō, Kyorai
  - Akuoke no (Ash-lye Tub), by Bonchō, Bashō, Yasui, Kyorai
  - Ume Wakana (Grass and Plum), by Bashō, Otokuni, Chinseki, Sonan, Hanzan, Tohō, Enpū, Bonchō and others
- Book 6: Notes to "Record of an Unreal Dwelling"

== Example ==
The first side of the renku Machinaka wa translated by Donald Keene (with title The Summer Moon):

In the city
What a heavy smell of things!
The summer moon.
(Bonchō)

How hot it is! How hot it is!
Voices call at gate after gate.
(Kyorai)

The second weeding
Has not even been finished,
But the rice is in ear.
(Bashō)

Brushing away the ashes,
A single smoked sardine.
(Bonchō)

In this neighborhood
They don't even recognize money—
How inconvenient!
(Bashō)

He just stands there stupidly
Wearing a great big dagger.
(Kyorai)

== Translations ==
=== English ===
- Maeda Cana, translator. Monkey's Raincoat. Grossman Publishers 1973. SBN 670–48651–5
- Earl Miner and Hiroko Odagiri, translators. The Monkey’s Straw Raincoat and Other Poetry of the Basho School. Princeton University Press 1981. ISBN 9780691064604
- Lenore Mayhew, translator. Monkey's Raincoat: Linked Poetry of the Basho School with Haiku Selections. Tuttle, 1985. ISBN 0804815003

=== Other languages ===
==== French ====
- René Sieffert, translator. Le Manteau de pluie du Singe. Société Franco-japonaise de Paris, 1986. ISBN 2716902186
- Georges Friedenkraft and Majima Haruki, translators. L'imperméable de paille du singe. l'Association Française de Haïku, 2011 (appeared previously in the Bulletin de l'Association des Anciens Élèves de l'INALCO, April 1992, p93)

==== German ====
- Geza S. Dombrady, translator. Das Affenmäntelchen. Dieterich'sche, 1994

=== Translations of individual kasen ===
- Tobi no ha mo (Kite's Feathers)
  - Makoto Ueda. Matsuo Bashō. Kodansha 1982. ISBN 0870115537 pp70–90
  - R. H. Blyth. Haiku, Volume One: Eastern Culture. Hokuseido Press 1981. ISBN 089346158X pp126–138
  - Hiroaki Sato and Burton Watson. From the Country of Eight Islands. Columbia University Press 1986. ISBN 0231063954 pp300–303
  - Earl Miner. Japanese Linked Poetry: An account with translations of renga and haikai sequences. Princeton University Press 1979. pp277–297
  - Etsuko Terasaki. "Hatsushigure: A Linked Verse Series by Bashō and his Disciples." Harvard Journal of Asiatic Studies, 36 (1976), pp204–239
  - Geoffrey Bownas and Anthony Thwaite. The Penguin Book of Japanese Verse. Penguin, 1964 ISBN 0140585273 pp124–127
  - William J. Higginson. The Haiku Seasons: Poetry of the Natural World. Kodansha, 1996 ISBN 4770016298 pp51–55 (verses 1–12 only)
  - Mario Riccò and Paolo Lagazzi, eds. Il muschio e la rugiada: Antologia di poesia giapponese. RCS Libri & Grandi Opere, 1996. ISBN 9788817171106 pp82–94 (in Italian)
- Machinaka wa (Town Center)
  - Donald Keene. World Within Walls: A History of Japanese Literature, Volume 2. Columbia University Press 1999. ISBN 978-0-231-11467-7 pp111–114
  - Makoto Ueda. Matsuo Bashō. Kodansha 1982. ISBN 0870115537 pp90–111
  - Steven D. Carter. Traditional Japanese Poetry: An Anthology. Stanford University Press, 1991. ISBN 9780804722124 pp366–375
  - Noriko de Vroomen and Leo de Ridder. De zomermaan en andere Japanse kettingverzen. Meulenhoff 1984. ISBN 9029015276 pp29–53 (in Dutch)
  - Miyamoto and Ueyama Masaoj, editors. Hajka antologio. L'Omnibuso-Kioto 1981. p195 (verses 1–10 only) (in Esperanto)
- Akuoke no (Ash-lye Tub)
  - Earl Miner. Japanese Linked Poetry: An account with translations of renga and haikai sequences. Princeton University Press 1979. pp316–335
  - Chris Drake. "Bashō's 'Cricket Sequence' as English Literature" in Journal of Renga & Renku Volume 2, 2012. pp7–65
  - Eiko Yachimoto and John Carley. "The Lye Tub" in Journal of Renga & Renku Volume 1, 2010. pp67–70
  - Jos Vos. Eeuwige reizigers: Een bloemlezing uit de klassieke Japanse literatuur. De Arbeiderspers, 2008. ISBN 9789029566032 pp572–579 (in Dutch)

== Bibliography ==
- Lenore Mayhew, translator. Monkey's Raincoat: Linked Poetry of the Basho School with Haiku Selections. Tuttle, 1985. ISBN 0804815003
- Haruo Shirane. Traces of Dreams: Landscape, Cultural Memory, and the Poetry of Basho. Stanford University Press, 1998. ISBN 0-8047-3099-7
- Nobuyuki Yuasa. The Narrow Road to the Deep North. Penguin, 1966. ISBN 0140441859
- Donald Keene. World Within Walls: A History of Japanese Literature, Volume 2. Columbia University Press 1999. ISBN 978-0-231-11467-7
