= Santōka Taneda =

Japanese haiku poet (1882–1940)

Taneda Santōka
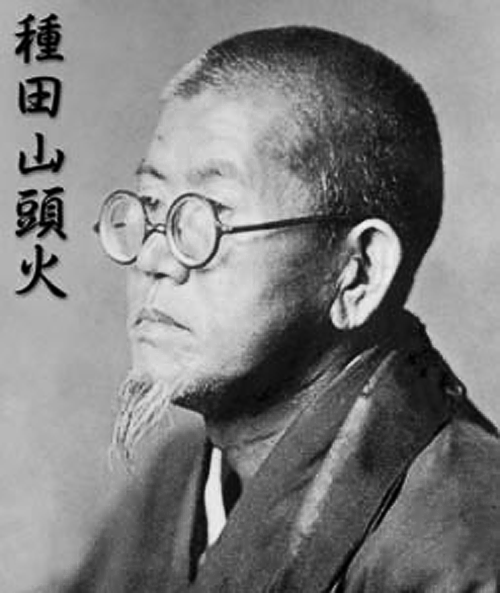
- Photo of Taneda Santōka
- Born: December 3, 1882; Japan Yamaguchi prefecture, Hofu
- Died: October 11, 1940 (aged 57)
- Other name: 種田 山頭火
- Occupation: Haiku poet

Japanese name
- Kanji: 種田 山頭火
- Hiragana: たねだ さんとうか
Transcriptions
- Romanization: Taneda Santōka

Santōka Taneda (種田 山頭火, Taneda Santōka; December 3, 1882 – October 11, 1940) was the pen-name of Shōichi Taneda (種田 正一, Taneda Shōichi), a Japanese author and haiku poet. He is known for his free verse haiku—a style which does not conform to the formal rules of traditional haiku.

== Early life ==
Santōka was born in a village located in Yamaguchi prefecture, to a wealthy land-owning family. When he was eleven his mother committed suicide by throwing herself into the family well. Though the exact reason for her action is unknown, according to Santōka's diaries his mother had finally reached the point where she could no longer live with her husband's philandering. Following the incident, Santōka was raised by his grandmother.

In 1902, he entered Waseda University in Tokyo as a student of literature. While there, he began drinking heavily, and in 1904, at the beginning of the Russo-Japanese War, he dropped out of school. The documented reason was "nervous breakdown", which some believe to be a euphemism for frequent and severe drunkenness. By that time his father Takejirō was in such dire financial straits that he could barely afford to pay his son's tuition.

In 1906, Taneda father and son sold off family land in order to open a sake brewery. In 1909 his father arranged for Santōka to marry Sato Sakino, a girl from a neighboring village. In his diaries, Santōka confesses that the sight of his mother's corpse being raised from her watery grave had forever tarnished his relationship with women. In 1910 Sakino gave birth to a son, Ken.

== Life as a Poet ==
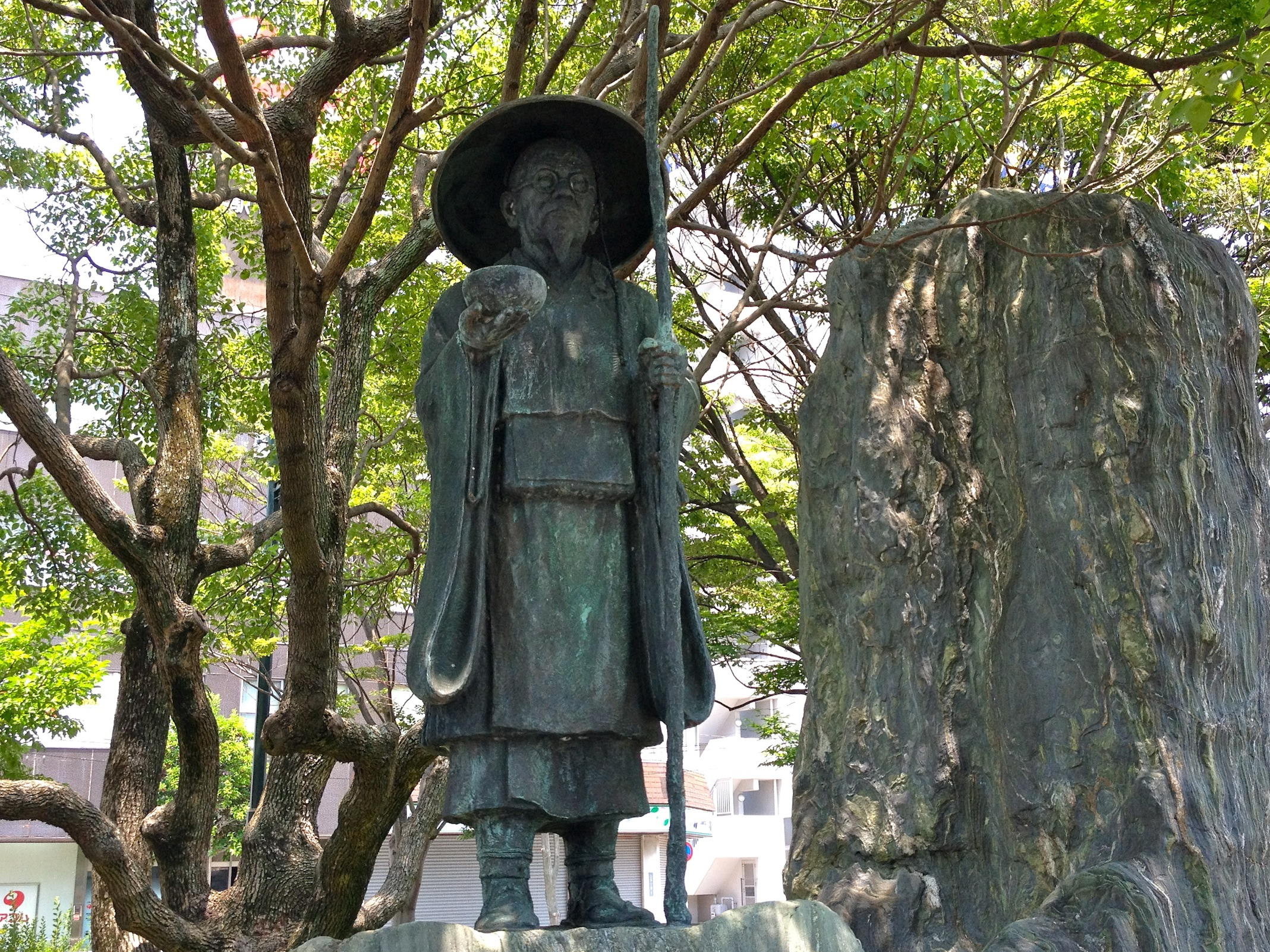
Statue of Taneda Santōka in front of Hofu Station

In 1911, Santōka began publishing translations of Ivan Turgenev and Guy de Maupassant in the literary journal Seinen (青年, Youth) under the pen name Santōka (山頭火). The name is originally one of the list of natchin (納音), i.e., labels given to a person's year of birth according to the Chinese sexegenary cycle, which are used for divination. However, the natchin Santōka is unrelated to the actual year in which the poet was born.

The word Santōka can be understood in at least two different ways. The literal meaning is "Mountain-top Fire". However, it can also mean "Cremation-ground Fire", since "mountain-top" is a metaphor for cremation grounds in Japanese. It has been speculated that this choice of name could be related to the traumatic experience of the suicide of Santōka's mother.

That same year, 1911, Santōka joined his area's local haiku group. At that time, his haiku mostly adhered to the traditional syllabic format, though some were hypersyllabic, for example:

In a café we debate decadence a summer butterfly flits
Kafe ni dekadan o ronzu natsu no chō toberi

In 1913, Santōka was accepted as a disciple by the leading haiku reformist Ogiwara Seisensui. Seisensui (1884–1976) could be regarded as the originator of the free-form haiku movement, though fellow writers Masaoka Shiki and Kawahigashi Hekigoto also deserve recognition. Writers following the early-twentieth century movement known as free-form or free-style haiku (shinkeikō 新傾向, lit. 'new trend') composed haiku lacking both the traditional 5-7-5 syllabic rule and the requisite seasonal word (kigo).

Santōka began regularly contributing poetry to Seisensui's haiku magazine Sōun (層雲, Layered Clouds). By 1916 he became an editor.

That same year, however, was marked by the bankruptcy of his father's sake brewery after two years of spoiled stock. The family lost all that remained of their once great fortune. His father fled into hiding and Santōka moved his family to Kumamoto City on the southern island of Kyūshū, where plans to open a second-hand bookstore soon materialized into the opening of a picture frame shop. Two years later, plagued by debt, Santōka's younger brother Jirō committed suicide. Then Santōka's grandmother died. In 1919, at the age of thirty-seven, Santōka left his family in order to find a job in Tokyo. In 1920, following her parents' wishes, Santōka divorced his wife. His father died soon after.

As an exponent of free style haiku, Santōka is often ranked alongside Ozaki Hōsai (1885–1926), a fellow student of Seisensui. They both suffered from the ill effects of their drinking habits and were similar in their reliance on Seisensui and other patrons of the arts for aid and support. The literary tone of their poems, however, differs.

Santōka proved no more reliable at working a steady job than he had at going to college, and though he did secure a permanent position as a librarian in 1920, by 1922 he was again unemployed due to another "nervous breakdown". He stayed in Tokyo long enough to experience the Great Kantō earthquake, after which he was apparently jailed as a suspect Communist. Soon after being released, he returned to Kumamoto City where he helped Sakino keep shop.

In 1924, an extremely drunk Santōka jumped in front of an oncoming train in what may have been a suicide attempt. The train managed to stop just inches from him, and he was brought by a newspaper reporter to the Sōtō Zen temple Hōon-ji, where the head priest Mochizuki Gian welcomed him to the Zen fraternity. The Zen life seemed to work for Santōka: by the next year at the age of forty-two he was ordained in the Sōtō sect.

In 1926, after a year spent as caretaker of Mitori Kannon-dō temple in Kumamoto, Santōka set out on the first of many walking trips. He was away for three years. Part of this time was spent completing the eighty-eight temple pilgrimage circuit on Shikoku Island. He visited the gravesite of his deceased friend Ozaki Hōsai.

In 1929 he returned briefly to Kumamoto to visit Sakino and publish some more haiku in Sōun. He also began a publication of his own, Sambaku (三八九), named after his boardinghouse. Soon, however, he was back on the road.

During his trips, Santōka wore his priest's robe and a large bamboo hat known as a kasa to keep off the sun. He had one bowl, which he used both for alms-getting and for eating. To survive, he went from house to house to beg. Begging (takuhatsu) is an important part of practice for monks in Japan, but, considering that Santōka was not a member of a monastery while he journeyed, begging just for his own needs, he was often regarded with disdain and on a few occasions even questioned by the police. A day's earnings would go toward a room at a guesthouse, food, and sake. It is clear from his diaries that he had very mixed feelings about his lifestyle:

March 28, 1933. Even if it means nothing to eat, I don't want to do any more of that hateful begging! People who have never done any begging seem to have difficulty understanding how I feel about this.

November 26, 1934. Loving sake, savoring sake, enjoying sake is not so bad. But drowning in sake, rioting in sake—that won't do! Running around drinking in this messy way—utterly stupid!

November 4, 1939. The rain began coming down in earnest and the wind was blowing hard... It blew my hat off, and my glasses went flying too—what a mess! But a grade-school student passing by retrieved them for me—many, many thanks! Rain kept getting worse, wind blowing stronger all the time—nothing to do but stop for the night at Okutomo—but none of the inns would have me. Let it be! is all I say and, looking like a drowned rat, I walk on, Finally can't go on any longer and take shelter in the lee of a roadside warehouse. I wring out my clothes, eat lunch, stay there for two hours. Deluge!—no other word for it—violent wind lashing it around, sheets of rain streaming sideways like a loose blind. I felt as though I had been bashed flat by heaven—a rather splendid feeling in fact. With evening I was able to make it as far as Shishikui, but again nobody would take me in. Finally I got to Kannoura, where I found an inn that would give me lodging, much to my relief.

In 1932, Santōka settled down for a time at a cottage in Yamaguchi prefecture. He named it "Gochūan" (其中庵) after a verse in the Lotus Sutra. While there, he published his first book of poems, Hachi no ko (鉢の子, "Rice Bowl Child"). He lived on the contributions of friends and admirers, whatever he could grow in his garden, and money sent from his son Ken. In 1934 he set off again on a walking trip, but soon grew seriously ill and had to return home. He attempted suicide but lived. In 1936, he again began to walk, intent on following the trail of the famous haiku poet Bashō (1644–1694) as described in Oku no Hosomichi (The Narrow Road to the Interior). He returned to Gōchuan after eight months.

In 1938, Gochūan became unfit for habitation, and after another walking trip, Santōka settled down at a small temple near Matsuyama City. On October 11, 1940, Santōka died in his sleep. He had published seven collections of poems and numerous editions of Sambaku. He was fifty-seven.

== Poetry ==
The following poem is a typical example of Santōka's work:

What, even my straw hat has started leaking

笠も漏り出したか

kasa mo moridashita ka

This poem exhibits two major features of free verse haiku:

- It is a single utterance that cannot be subdivided into a 5-7-5 syllable structure, and
- It does not contain a season word.

The poem does, however, hint at a natural phenomenon—rain—by referring to the straw hat and to the fact that it is leaking.

---Another interpretation /
I'm traveling by myself wearing a straw hat.
It began to rain, and my face began to get wet.
There is no place to take shelter from the rain in an unpopular place.
But I keep walking.
---

Below are further examples of free haiku poems by Santōka:

- Excerpts from Hiroaki Sato's translation of Santōka's Grass and Tree Cairn:

I go in I go in still blue mountains
Wakeitte mo wakeitte mo aoi yama

Fluttering drunk leaves scatter
Horohoro yōte ki no ha chiru

- Excerpts from Burton Watson's translation For All My Walking:

there
where the fire was
something blooming
yake-ato nani yara saite iru

feel of the needle
when at last
you get the thread through it
yatto ito ga tōtta hari no kanshoku
