= Konpuku-ji =

Buddhist temple in Sakyō-ku, Kyoto, Japan

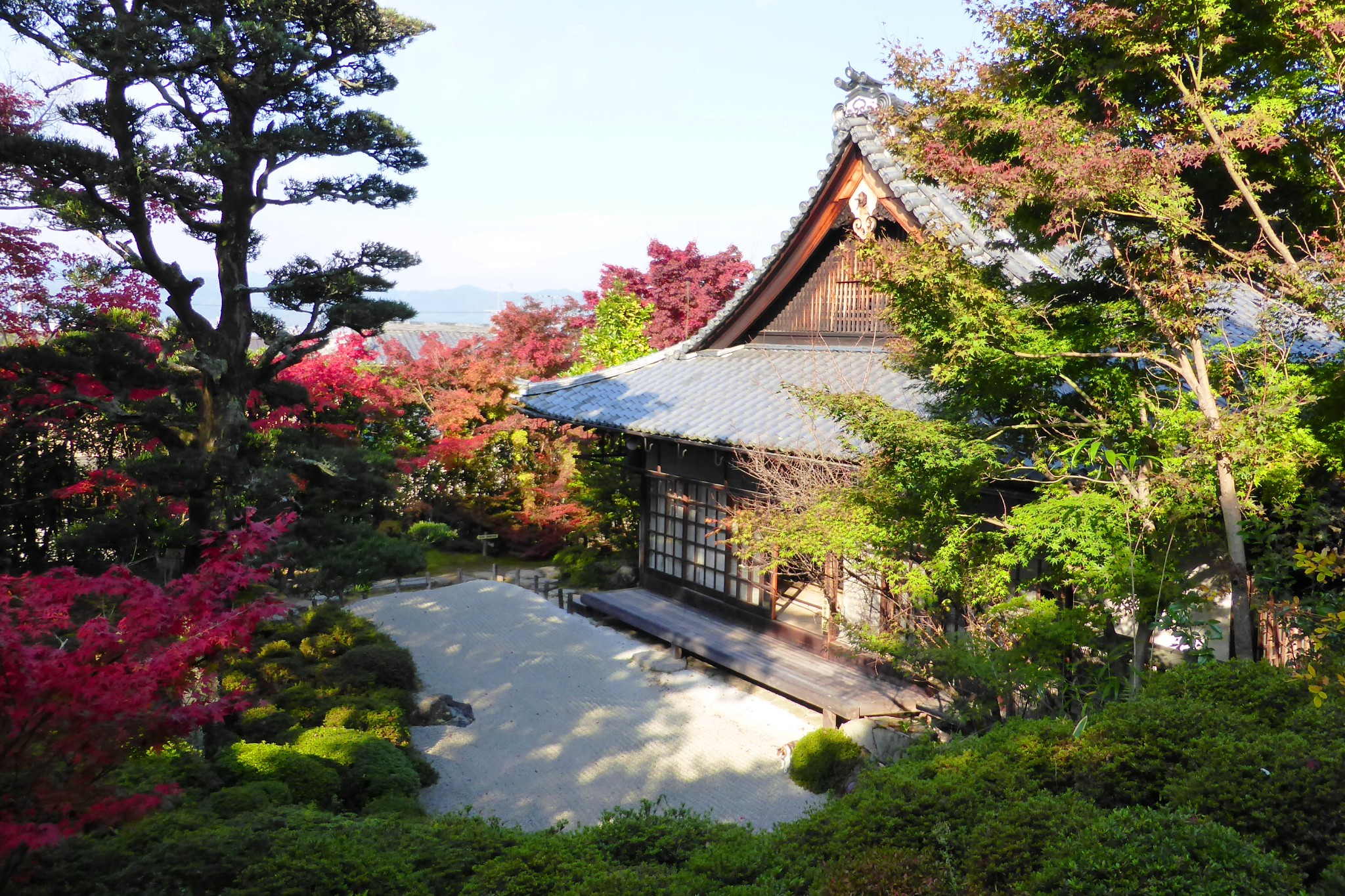
- Konpuku-ji main hall and garden

Religion
- Affiliation: Zen, Rinzai sect, Nanzen-ji school
- Deity: Kannon

Location
- Location: 20 Saikatachi-chō, Ichijōji, Sakyō-ku, Kyoto, Kyoto Prefecture
- Interactive map of Konpuku-ji
- Coordinates: 35°2′32.04″N 135°47′42.75″E

Architecture
- Founder: An'e
- Completed: 864

Konpuku-ji (金福寺) is a Zen Buddhist temple in Sakyō-ku, Kyoto, Japan.

== History ==
In 864, as Ennin's dying wish, the Buddhist priest An'e built this temple and installed a statue of Kannon that had been made by Ennin himself. At first the temple was part of the Tendai sect, but eventually the temple fell into ruin. During the Genroku era (1688–1704), the temple was restored by Tesshu from the nearby Enkō-ji, and acted as a branch of that temple. It was also converted to the Rinzai sect.

When Matsuo Bashō traveled to Kyoto to visit his friend Tesshu, he stayed in a thatched hut in the back of the garden, and after some time, the hut was named Bashō-an. However, it fell into ruin, and in 1776 Yosa Buson restored it. The thatched roof hut stands on the east side of the garden, and inside is a tea room.

Buson's grave is also located at the temple.
