= Yosa Buson =

Japanese poet and painter

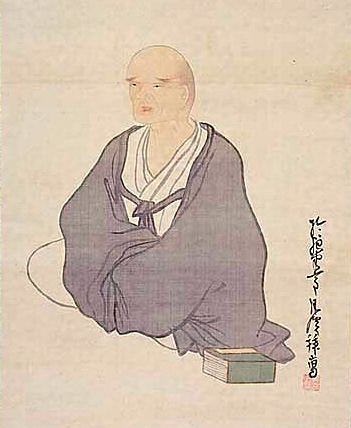
Yosa Buson, drawing by Matsumura Goshun

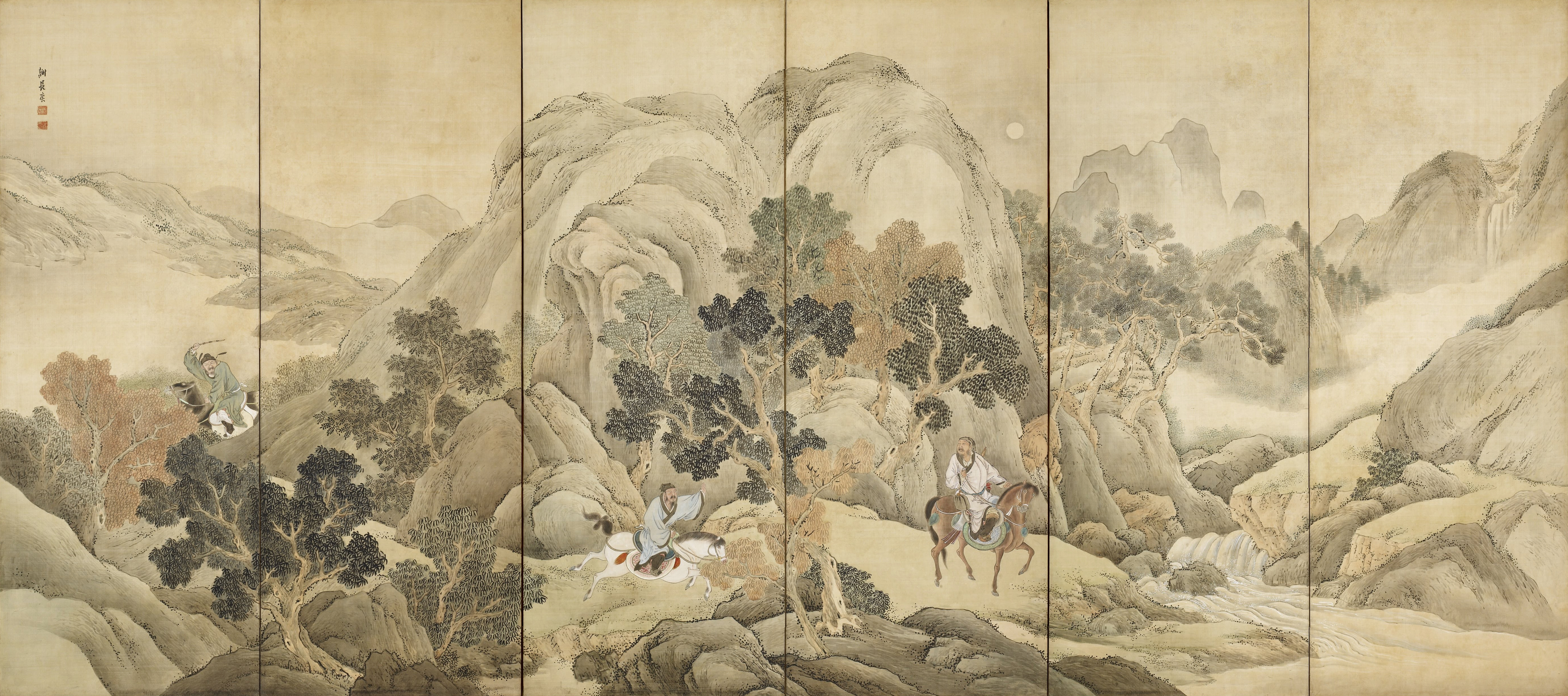
Xiao He chases Han Xin by Yosa Buson (Nomura Art Museum)

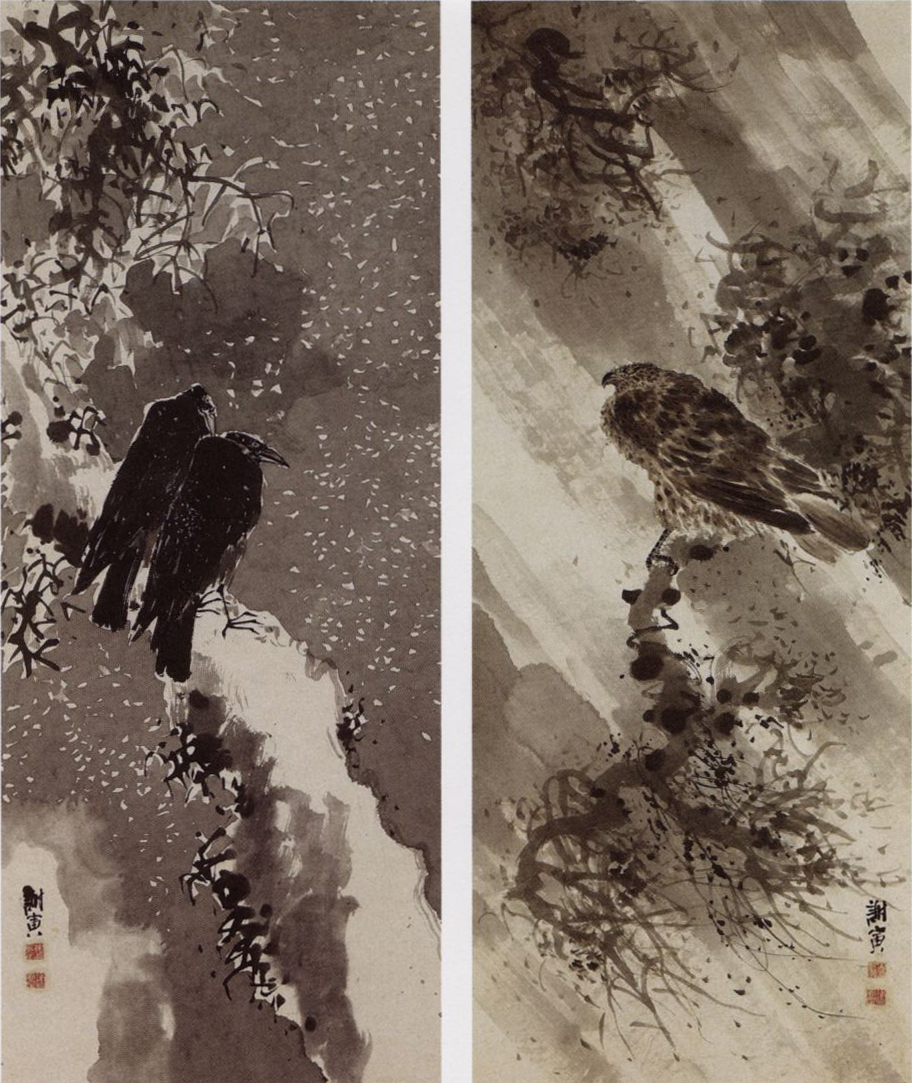
Yosa Buson, Crows and Falcon

Yosa (no) Buson (与謝 蕪村; Japanese pronunciation: [joꜜ.sa | bɯꜜ.soɴ]) was a Japanese poet and painter of the Edo period. He lived from 1716 – January 17, 1784. Along with Matsuo Bashō and Kobayashi Issa, Buson is considered among the greatest poets of the Edo Period. He is also known for completing haiga as a style of art, working with haibun prose, and experimenting with a mixed Chinese-Japanese style of poetry.

== Biography ==
=== Early life, training, and travels ===
Buson was born in the village of Kema in Settsu Province (present-day Kema, Miyakojima Ward, Osaka). His original family name was Taniguchi. Buson scarcely discussed his childhood, but it is commonly thought that he was the illegitimate son of the village head and a migrant worker from Yoza. According to the Taniguchi family in Yosano, Kyoto, Buson was the son of a servant woman named Gen, who had come to work in Osaka and had a child with her master. A grave of Gen survives in Yosano. There is an oral tradition that the young Buson had been cared for at the Seyaku-ji temple in Yosano, and later, when Buson returned to Tango Province, he gave the temple a folding screen painting as a gift.

Around the age of 20, Buson moved to Edo (present-day Tokyo). He learned poetry under the tutelage of the haikai master Hayano Hajin, who named the house he taught in Yahantei (Midnight Pavilion). After Hajin died, Buson moved to Shimōsa Province (present-day Ibaraki Prefecture). Following in the footsteps of his idol, Matsuo Bashō, Buson travelled through the wilds of northern Honshū that had been the inspiration for Bashō's famous travel diary, Oku no Hosomichi (The Narrow Road to the Interior). He published his notes from the trip in 1744, marking the first time he published under the name Buson.

After travelling through various parts of Japan, including Tango (the northern part of present-day Kyoto Prefecture) and Sanuki Province (present-day Kagawa Prefecture), Buson settled down in the city of Kyoto at the age of 42. Around this time, he began to write under the name of Yosa, which he took from his mother's birthplace (Yosa, Tango Province).

Between 1754 and 1757, Buson worked on the collection of haiga-style picture scrolls, Buson yōkai emaki.

Buson married at the age of 45 and had one daughter, Kuno. At the age of 51, he left his wife and children in Kyoto and went to Sanuki Province to work on many works.

=== Later work and death ===
After returning to Kyoto again, he wrote and taught poetry at the Sumiya. As models for his pupils, he singled out four of Bashō's disciples: Kikaku, Kyorai, Ransetsu, and Sodō. In 1770, he assumed the haigō (俳号, haiku pen name) of Yahantei II (夜半亭二世, "Midnight Studio"), which had been the pen name of his teacher Hajin.

Buson died at the age of 68 and was buried at Konpuku-ji temple in Kyoto.

The cause of death was previously diagnosed as severe diarrhea, but recent investigations indicate that it was myocardial infarction.

His work is kept in many museums worldwide, including the Seattle Art Museum, the Metropolitan Museum of Art, the University of Michigan Museum of Art, the Harvard Art Museums, the Worcester Art Museum, the Kimbell Art Museum, and the British Museum.

== Sample poems ==
隅々に残る寒さや梅の花
Sumizumi ni nokoru samusa ya ume no hana

In nooks and corners
Cold remains:
Flowers of the plum
(translated by RH Blyth)

=== Peony Petals ===
Peony petals

fall, two or three

on each other

Other Hokku

the morning glory—

in each flower, the color

of a deep pool

spring drizzle

barely enough to moisten

seashells on the beach

== Reception ==
Buson believed that poems should be natural, without strict rules or guidelines. His training in Yahantei had promoted a light-hearted approach that stressed individual style, rather than replicating the work of a master. Because of Buson's lack of interest in the modern trends of his time in terms of poetry, his works were considered by some to be outdated.

Buson's paintings, on the other hand, were more widely accepted in his time. Painting was the main source of his income, so he could not afford to approach it as he did poetry.

== English editions ==
- The King of Hell's Mouth. Calambac Publishing House, Germany 2017, ISBN 978-3-943117-94-3.

== See also ==
- Buson yōkai emaki, emakimono by Buson
