= Matsuki Tantan =

Matsuki Tantan (松木 淡々; 1674–1761) was a haikai poet of the mid-Edo period. Born in 1674, his family home was the Awa-ya in Nishi-Yokobori, Osaka. He went to Edo and studied under Tateba Fukaku and Enomoto Kikaku. Later, in Kyoto and Osaka, he gained popularity with a haikai style called Hanjian-rya. He died in 1761, at the age of 88.

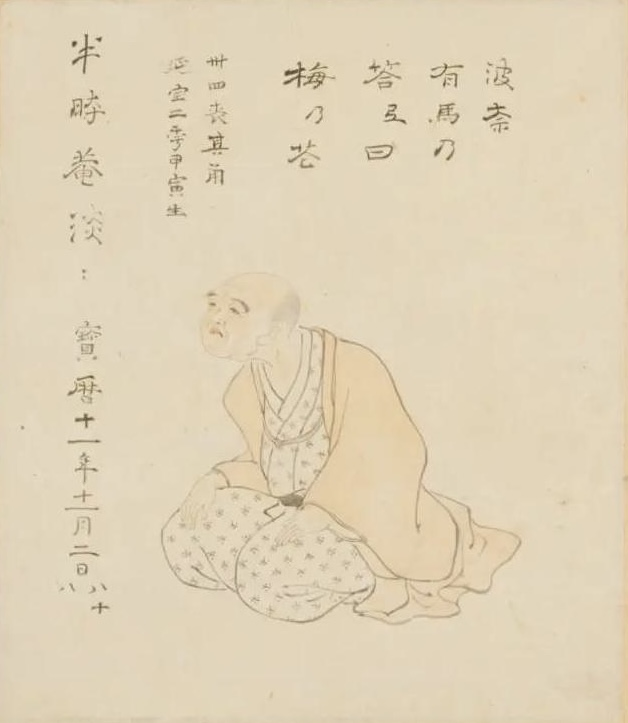
