= Kaga no Chiyo =

Japanese writer

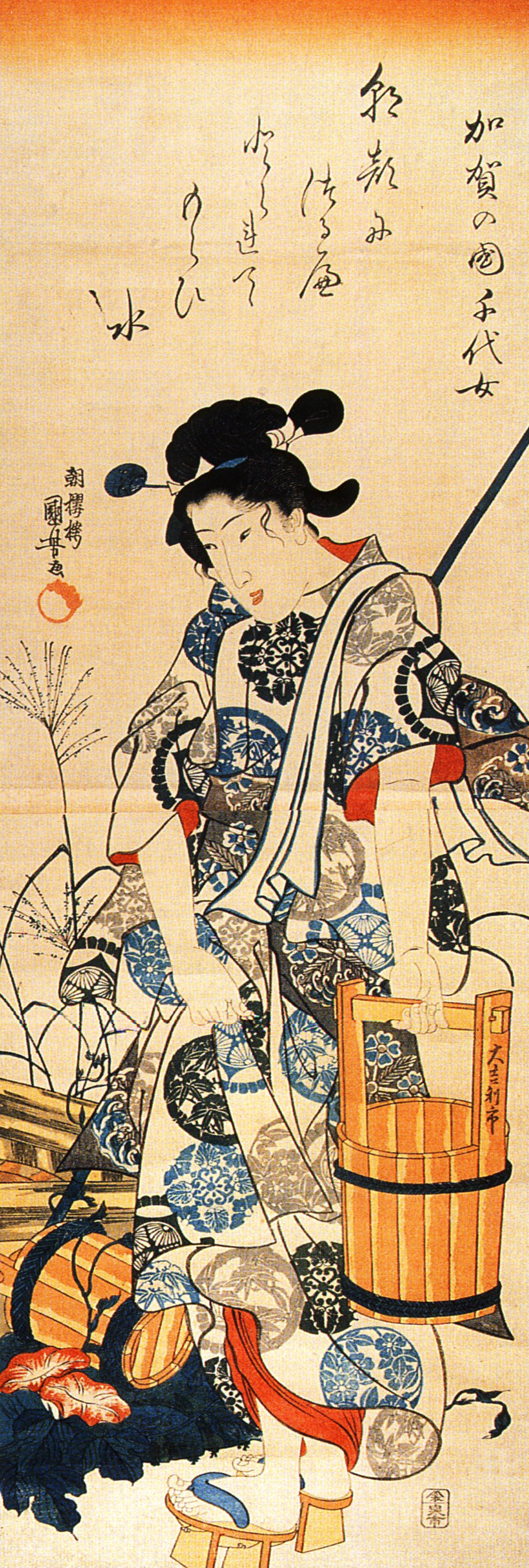
Chiyo-ni standing beside a well. This woodcut by Utagawa Kuniyoshi illustrates her most famous haiku: finding a bucket entangled in the vines of a morning glory, she will go ask for water rather than disturb the flower.

Kaga no Chiyo (加賀 千代; Japanese pronunciation: [kaꜜ.ɡa no | tɕiꜜ.jo, kaꜜ.ŋa-], 1703 - 2 October 1775), also known as Chiyo-jo (千代女; [tɕiꜜ.jo.(d)ʑo], lit. 'Lady Chiyo' (Note: The suffix -jo (女; lit. 'female person', also transl. daughter) was historically used as a title for some female figures, such as Chiyo-jo, Shūshiki-jo, Shijo, Seijo.)) or Chiyo-ni (千代尼; lit. 'Chiyo the Nun'), was a Japanese poet of the Edo period and a Buddhist nun. She is widely regarded as one of the greatest poets of haiku (then called hokku). Some of Chiyo's most notable works include "The Morning Glory", "Putting up my hair", and "Again the women".

Being one of the few women haiku poets in pre-modern Japanese literature, Chiyo-ni has been seen an influential figure. Before her time, haiku by women were often dismissed and ignored. She began writing haiku at seven years old, and by age seventeen she had become very popular all over Japan. Chiyo-ni continued writing throughout her life. Influenced by the renowned poet Matsuo Bashō but emerging and as independent figure with a unique voice in her own right, Chiyo-ni's dedication not only paved a way for her career but also opened a path for other women to follow. Chiyo-ni is known as a "forerunner, who played the role of encouraging cultural exchange with Korea".

She is perhaps best known for this haiku:

morning glory!
the well-bucket entangled,
I ask for water

Today, the morning glory is a favorite flower for the people of her home town, because she left a number of poems on that flower. Shokouji temple in Hakusan contains a display of her personal effects.

== Biography ==
Chiyo-ni was born in Matto, Kaga Province (now Hakusan, Ishikawa Prefecture), in February 1703, the eldest daughter of a scroll mounter. At an early age, Chiyo-ni was introduced to art and poetry, and she began writing haiku poetry at the age of seven. By the age of seventeen, she had become very popular all over Japan for her poetry.

Her poems, although mostly dealing with nature, work for a unity of nature with humanity. Her own life was that of the haikai poets who made their lives and the world they lived in one with themselves through living a simple and humble life. She was able to make connections by being observant and studying her surroundings, then writing them down.

At age twelve, Chiyo-ni's studied under two haiku poets who had themselves apprenticed with the great poet Matsuo Bashō, and many in her time saw her as one of Bashō's true heirs, both in her poetry and in her humble attitude of warm awareness toward the world and her simple living. She studied Basho's style of writing poems in her early years, although she did develop on her own as an independent figure with her own unique voice.

She was well aware of being considered Bashō's heir and on a portrait of Bashō she wrote in calligraphy:

To listen,
fine not to listen, fine too ...
nightingale

She appears to say that while she did listen to him, she also did not copy him, "not to listen, fine too."

In around 1720 she married a servant of the Fukuoka family of Kanazawa, and had one child with him, a son, who died in infancy. Her husband died of disease not long after in 1722. She valued her independence too much, and despite her loneliness, she did not remarry, so she returned home to her parents.

It may be that after her husband's death Chiyo-ni lived with and cared for her elderly parents and worked in the family’s scroll mounting business. She wrote:

parents older than I
are now my children
the same cicadas

After her parents died, she adopted a married couple to carry on the family business and in 1754, at the age of fifty-two (by East Asian age reckoning), Chiyo-ni chose to become a Buddhist nun. "Not", she said, "in order to renounce the world, but as a way 'to teach her heart to be like the clear water which flows night and day." Chiyo-ni shaved her head and started to live in a temple with other nuns and took the Buddhist name Soen. She continued her writing and lived the rest of her simple yet peaceful life in the manner of haikai.

In 1764, she was chosen to prepare the official gift for Maeda Shigemichi, the daimyō of her region, to the Korean Delegation led by civil minister Jo Eom. Chiyo-ni crafted and delivered 21 artworks based on her twenty-one haiku.

Chiyo-ni died in 1775.

== In popular culture ==
- The American rock band Red House Painters adapted one of Chiyo's haiku for the chorus of their song "Dragonflies".

== See also ==
- Japanese literature
- List of Japanese authors
- List of Japanese women writers
