= Kireji =

Special class of words in Japanese traditional poetry

Kireji (切れ字; lit. "cutting word") are a special category of words used in certain types of Japanese traditional poetry. It is regarded as a requirement in traditional haiku, as well as in the hokku, or opening verse, of both classical renga and its derivative renku (haikai no renga). There is no exact equivalent of kireji in English, and its function can be difficult to define. It is said to supply structural support to the verse. When placed at the end of a verse, it provides a dignified ending, concluding the verse with a heightened sense of closure. Used in the middle of a verse, it briefly cuts the stream of thought, indicating that the verse consists of two thoughts half independent of each other. In such a position, it indicates a pause, both rhythmically and grammatically, and may lend an emotional flavour to the phrase preceding it.

== List of common kireji ==
Classical renga developed a tradition of 18 kireji, which were adopted by haikai, thence used for both renku and haiku, the most common of which are listed below:

- ka (か): emphasis; when at end of a phrase, it indicates a question
- kana (哉/かな): emphasis; usually can be found at a poem's end, indicates wonder
- -keri (〜けり): exclamatory verbal suffix, past perfect
- -ramu or -ran (〜らむ/〜らん): verbal suffix indicating probability
- -shi (〜し): adjectival suffix; usually used to end a clause
- -tsu (〜つ): verbal suffix; present perfect
- ya (や): emphasises the preceding word or words. Cutting a poem into two parts, it implies an equation, while inviting the reader to explore their interrelationship.

== Use ==
Hokku and haiku consist of 17 Japanese syllables, or on (a phonetic unit identical to the mora), in three metrical phrases of 5, 7, and 5 on respectively. A kireji is typically positioned at the end of one of these three phrases. When it is placed at the end of the final phrase (i.e. the end of the verse), the kireji draws the reader back to the beginning, initiating a circular pattern. A large number of hokku, including many of those by Bashō, end with either -keri, an exclamatory auxiliary verb, or the exclamatory particle kana, both of which initiate such a circular pattern. Placed elsewhere in the verse, a kireji performs the paradoxical function of both cutting and joining; it not only cuts the ku into two parts, but also establishes a correspondence between the two images it separates, implying that the latter represents the poetic essence (本意, hon'i) of the former, creating two centres and often generating an implicit comparison, equation, or contrast between the two separate elements.

The hokku author must compose a syntactically complete verse capable (alone among the verses of a linked poem) of standing alone, probably because the hokku, as the first verse of the renku or renga, sets the stage for the rest of the poem, and therefore should not leave itself open to overt modification in the next verse. The conventional way of making sure that a hokku has such linguistic integrity is to include a kireji.

== In English haiku and hokku ==
Kireji have no direct equivalent in English. Mid-verse kireji have been described as sounded, rather than written punctuation. In English-language haiku and hokku, as well as in translations of such verses into this language, kireji may be represented by punctuation (typically by a dash or an ellipsis), an exclamatory particle (such as 'how...'), or simply left unmarked.

== Examples ==
The examples below are laid out as follows:

- Haiku in Japanese
- Rōmaji transliteration
- Literal word-for-word translation
- Translated poem

=== Mid-verse ya ===
行く	春	や	鳥	泣	魚	の	目	は	泪
yuku	haru	ya	tori	naki	uo	no	me	wa	namida
go	spring	—	bird	crying	fish	's	eye	as-for	tear

spring going—
birds crying and tears
in the eyes of fish

— Bashō, tr. Shirane

=== End-verse kana ===
ひやひや	と	壁	を	ふまへて	昼寝	哉
hiyahiya	to	kabe	wo	fumaete	hirune	kana
cool	so	wall	(accusative)	put-feet-on	siesta	how

how cool the feeling
of a wall against the feet—
siesta

— Bashō, tr. Darlington
