= Ogiwara Seisensui =

Japanese haiku poet (1884–1976)

- Born: Ogiwara Tōkichi (荻原 藤吉); 16 June 1884; Tokyo, Japan
- Died: 11 May 1976 (aged 91); Kamakura, Kanagawa, Japan
- Occupation: Writer
- Writing career
- Genre: Haiku

Japanese name
- Kanji: 荻原 井泉水
- Hiragana: おぎわら せいせんすい
Transcriptions
- Romanization: Ogiwara Seisensui

Ogiwara Seisensui (荻原 井泉水; 16 June 1884 – 11 May 1976) was the pen-name of Ogiwara Tōkichi (荻原 藤吉), a Japanese haiku poet active during the Taishō and Shōwa periods of Japan.

== Early life ==
Ogiwara Tōkichi was born in Shinmei, Shiba, Tokyo City (present-day Hamamatsu, Minato, Tokyo), the second son of a merchant who owned a general goods store called Nitta-ya. The Ogiwara family was originally from Takada, Echigo Province (present-day Jōetsu, Niigata), and his grandfather Tōkichi had moved to Edo as a young man. Both of his siblings died in infancy. Although he attended Seisoku Junior High School, Ogiwara was expelled after publishing a student newspaper criticizing the school's educational methods and administration. After entering Azabu Junior High School, he quit drinking and smoking, seriously engaged in studying, and gained admission to Tokyo Imperial University. While a student majoring in linguistics, he became interested in writing haiku.

== Literary career ==
Seisensui co-founded the avant-garde literary magazine Sōun ("Layered Clouds") in 1911, together with fellow haiku poet Kawahigashi Hekigoto. Ogiwawa was a strong proponent of abandoning haiku traditions, especially the "season words" so favored by Takahama Kyoshi, and even the 5-7-5 syllable norms. In his Haiku teisho (1917), he broke with Hekigoto and shocked the haiku world by advocating further that haiku be transformed into free verse. His students included Ozaki Hōsai and Taneda Santōka. His role in promoting the format of free-style haiku has been compared with that of Masaoka Shiki for traditional verse, with the contrast that Seisensui had both vigorous health, and considerable wealth. He also was able to use new media to promote his style, including lectures and literary criticism on national radio.

Seisensui left more than 200 works, including collections of haiku, essays, and travelogues. His principal anthologies are Wakiizuru mono (1920) and Choryu (1964). He also wrote a number of commentaries on the works of Matsuo Bashō.

In 1965, he became a member of the Japan Art Academy.

== Personal life ==
Seisensui's wife and daughter perished in the Great Kantō earthquake of 1923, and his mother died the same year. He moved to Kyoto briefly, and lived for a while at a chapel within the Buddhist temple of Tofuku-ji. He also began a period of travel around the country. He remarried in 1929, and relocated to Kamakura, Kanagawa. He moved to Azabu in Tokyo until his house was destroyed during World War II. He then moved back to Kamakura in 1944, where he lived until his death.

== Works ==
=== Poetry Collections ===
- The Door of Nature (Sōun First Collection). Tōundō Shoten, 1914
- Nichizō (edited). Gendai Tsūhōsha, 1916
- Bright Pearl (Sōjō Second Collection / Isen Extracts Vol. 2) (edited). Gendai Tsūhōsha, 1918
- The Tree of Life. Sōunsha, 1918
- That Which Wells Forth (Isen Collection Vol. 1), 1920
- Landscape Heart Sutra (Sōun Fourth Collection). Sōunsha, 1922
- Out into the Fields (Poetry collection). Sōunsha, 1923
- In Constant Flux (Isen Collection Vol. 2). Shūeikaku, 1924
- Digging a Spring (Sōun Fifth Collection). Sōunsha, 1925
- Isensui Haiku Collection. Kinseido, 1925
- After the Conflagration (Sōun Sixth Collection). Sōunsha, 1927
- Universal Repentance (Isen Collection Vol. 3). Shunjūsha, 1928
- Shii no Ha Collection (21 Practice Haiku). Sōunsha, 1929
- The Short-Rhythm Era (Sōun Seventh Collection). Sōunsha, 1929
- Melodies of Shōwa (Sōun Collection Vol. 8). Sōunsha, 1931
- Brahmacarya Chapter (Isen Collection Vol. 4). Kaizōsha, 1932
- Steam Collection (28 Practice Haiku). Sōunsha, 1932
- Isen Collection Vol. 4. Sōunsha, 1932
- One Person, One Realm (Sōun Collection Vol. 9). Sōunsha, 1933
- Isensui Haiku Collection. Ogihara Seibunkan, 1934
- The Tenth Ox (Sōun Collection Vol. 10). Sōunsha, 1935
- Nowhere (Isen Collection Vol. 5). Mikasa Shobō, 1935
- Overseas Travel Manuscripts. Ōsen’en, December 1938
- Sound of the Tide. Ichijō Shobō, 1943
- Non-Duality. Sakurai Shoten, 1943
- A Thousand-Mile Journey (Self-selected Haiku Collection). Kobunsha, 1946
- Golden Sand. Meguro Shoten, 1946
- Original Spring: Isensui Haiku Collection (Selected works from Taishō 1 to Shōwa 20). Sōunsha, 1960
- Long Current: Isensui Extracts (Selected works from Shōwa 21 to Shōwa 35). Commemorative Committee for Isensui’s 88th Birthday, 1964
- Ōe: Isensui Collection. Yayoi Shobō, 1971
- Ogihara Isensui (edited by Kazuyuki Fujimoto). Kagyuusha, June 1992 (Kagyū Haiku Library)
- Sōun First & Second Collections: The Door of Nature / The Tree of Life. Seihosha, November 2016

=== Criticism & Essays ===
- Advocating Haiku. Sōunsha, 1917
- Questions and Answers on Haiku Composition. Gendai Tsūhōsha, 1918
- Steps of Haiku. Gendai Tsūhōsha, 1918
- A Brief History of Haiku. Gendai Tsūhōsha, 1919
- Shortcut to Composition. Gendai Tsūhōsha, 1920
- Selected Haiku Criticism. Gendai Tsūhōsha, 1920
- Behold the New Haiku. Sōunsha, 1920
- Samadhi of Light. Sōunsha, 1920
- How to Compose New Haiku. Nihon Hyōronsha Publishing Dept., 1921
- For Those Beginning Haiku. Nihon Hyōronsha Publishing Dept., 1921
- Ten Years of the Haiku World. Konishi Shoten, 1922
- Commentary on New Haiku. Konishi Shoten, 1922
- New Haiku Advocacy. Tenyūsha, 1922
- Bashō the Traveler. Shunjūsha, 1923
- Speaking in the Shade: New Haiku Talks. Nihon Hyōronsha Publishing Dept., 1923
- Tick-Tock Diary. Nihon Shoin, 1923
- From My Small Spring. Kōransha, 1924
- Bashō’s View of Nature. Shunjūsha, 1924
- While Waiting for the Rising Sun. Shūeikaku, 1924
- On the Ancients. Shūeikaku, 1924
- Lamenting the Earth. Shinsakusha, 1924
- As I Remain Lonely. Shūeikaku, 1925
- Bashō the Traveler, Sequel. Shunjūsha, 1925
- Bashō and Issa. Shunjūsha, later paperback editions
- Isen Haiku Talks (Complete 4 volumes). Sōunsha / Shunjūsha, 1921–1929
- Impressions of Travel. Nihon Shoin, 1926
- Research on New Haiku. Shunjūsha, 1926
- How to Compose and Appreciate Haiku. Jitsugyō no Nihon Sha, 1927
- Sketches of Kyoto. Sōgensha, 1929
- Kannon Pilgrimage. Shunyōdō, 1929
- Journey Upon Journey. Shunyōdō, 1929
- On the Taste for Haiku. Shunjū Bunko, 1929
- Living Among Mountains and Rivers. Sōgensha, 1930
- Travel Conversations. Sōgensha, 1930
- Higurashi Collection. Sōunsha, 1930
- Seeking the Narrow Road to the Interior. Shunyōdō, 1930
- Trends in the Haiku World. Shunjū Bunko, 1930
- Bashō Landscapes. Shunjūsha, 1930
- Roundtable on New Haiku. Shunjūsha, 1931
- The First Door. Sōunsha, 1931
- Introduction to Bashō. Shunyōdō, 1931
- The Way of Haiku. Ritsumeikan Publishing Dept., 1932 (reprinted in Gendai Kyōyō Bunko, 1953)
- A Certain Day’s Smile. Shijō Shobō, 1933
- Travel Talk, Haiku Talk. Shijō Shobō, 1933
- The Second Door. Sōunsha, 1933
- Lord Bashō. Jitsugyō no Nihon Sha, 1933
- The Human Path and the Path of Composition. Sōunsha, 1933
- Conventional Views of Oku no Hosomichi. Shunjū Bunko, 1933
- Notes on Issa. Ōhata Shoten, 1934
- Spring and Autumn Papers. Iwanami Shoten, 1934
- The Book of Blue Sky. Buntaisha, 1934
- Bashō, Buson, and Shiki. Chikura Shobō, 1934
- Speaking of Bashō on the Air. Jitsugyō no Nihon Sha, 1934
- In Search of Bashō. Sōgensha, 1934
- Pilgrimage and Pilgrims. Sōgensha, 1934
- Going Like the Clouds. Shimizu Shoten, 1935
- Floral and Avian Sketches. Mikasa Shobō, 1935
- Book in the Flames. Okakura Shobō, 1935
- Haiku Talks. Chikura Shobō, 1935
- Yamagiri Collection. Sōunsha, 1935
- Selected Haiku Commentary Vol. 6: Free-Verse Haiku Commentary. Hibonsha, 1935
- Entering Haiku. Shinchō Bunko, 1936
- Appreciating New Haiku. Shunjūsha, 1936
- Personal Writings. Buntaisha, 1936
- Haiku Course. Chikura Shobō, 1936
- Riding a White Horse. Jinbun Shoin, 1936
- Introduction to Free-Verse Haiku. Daitō Shuppansha, 1937
- From Basics to Mastery in Haiku. Jitsugyō no Nihon Sha, 1937
- America Correspondence. Kawade Shobō, 1938
- In Search of Issa. Ikuei Shoin, 1938
- Issa Spring and Autumn. Ikuei Shoin, 1938
- Issa Research. Shinchō Bunko, 1938
- Self-Portrait Sketch (Self-Commentary on My Own Haiku). Kawade Shobō, 1939
- Ogihara Isensui Booklet Vols. 1–6. Ōsen’en, 1937–39
- New Haiku Introduction. Jitsugyō no Nihon Sha, 1940
- Issa Reader. Nihon Hyōronsha, 1940
- The Spirit that Practices Haiku. Kobun Shobō, 1941
- The Spirit of Bashō. Meguro Shoten, 1941
- Pilgrimage Diary. Fujokai-sha, 1941
- My Head. Takayama Shoin, 1941
- Issa Story. Dōwa Shunjūsha, 1942
- Spring, Summer, Autumn, Winter. Kuwana Bunseidō, 1942
- East, West, South, North. Sakurai Shoten, 1942
- Writings from Wherever I Am. Tenyū Shobō, 1942
- Morning and Evening: Bashō Essays. Kaiseisha, 1943
- Isensui Conversations. Jitsugyō no Nihon Sha, 1943
- Revival from Death. Ittō Shobō, 1946
- Mukai Kyorai. Seikatsusha, 1946
- Young Leaves. Sekai-sha, 1946
- Kyoto in Spring and Autumn. Usui Shobō, 1946
- Spring Revives. Sakura Shobō, 1946
- American Travelogue. Teramoto Shobō, 1947
- Issa: Reflections. Manji Shorin, 1947
- Clear Autumn Sky. Fukoku Shuppansha, 1947
- Sesame-Miso Tales. Sōunsha, 1948
- Spring is Dawn: Bashō Essays. Usui Shobō, 1948
- Persimmons and Peaches. Yashiro Shoten, 1948
- Sweetfish. Meguro Shoten, 1949
- Appreciating Bashō’s Famous Haiku. Meguro Shoten, 1949
- Masaoka Shiki: Father of Popular Art. Kaiseisha, 1953
- Haiku Guide. Motomoto-sha, 1954
- Every Day a Good Day. Nihon Shuppan Kyōdō, 1954
- Noppei Soup. Ikeda Shoten, 1955
- Book of Flowing Water. Ikeda Shoten, 1955
- Oku no Hosomichi Notes. Shinchōsha, 1955
- Essay Collection on Bashō (8 vols.). Shunjūsha, 1955–56
- Kenjin Soup: Isensui Essays. Shinsei Shobō, 1956
- Essay Collection on Issa (6 vols.). Shunjūsha, 1956–57
- Issa Masterpiece Stories. Dōwa Shunjūsha, 1957
- Bashō’s Famous Haiku. Shakai Shisō Kenkyūkai Publishing Dept., 1957
- New Interpretation of the Record of Words. Shunjūsha, 1958
- Issa’s Famous Haiku. Shakai Shisō Kenkyūkai Publishing Dept., 1959
- Japanese Seasonal Travel Chronicle. Shūdōsha, 1960
- Creative Work: My Spring. Shinchōsha, 1960
- Life is Long. Jitsugyō no Nihon Sha, 1961
- Oku no Hosomichi Landscapes. Shakai Shisō Kenkyūkai Publishing Dept., 1961
- Life Reader. Jitsugyō no Nihon Sha, 1962
- Life is Joy. Jitsugyō no Nihon Sha, 1962
- Novel: Bashō’s Diary. Asahi Shimbunsha, 1964
- Bashō in Framed Paintings: Spring and Autumn. Yutaka Shobō, 1970
- Twenty-Four Views of Oku no Hosomichi. Yutaka Shobō, 1971
- Poetry and Life. Chōbunsha, 1972
- Selected Bashō the Traveler. Yutaka Shobō, 1972
- Nature, Self, Freedom. Keisō Shobō, 1972
- Grass Paintings Collection. Nichibō Shuppansha, 1973
- New Interpretation of Ekiken’s Yōjōkun. Daihōrinkaku, 1975
- Isensui Tanzaku Collection. Gogatsu Shobō, 1975
- The Four Seas. Bunka Hyōron Shuppan, 1976
- Eccentrics and Ordinary People. Daihōrinkaku, 1976
- Good Season for Humanity. Furukawa Shobō, December 1977
- Sixty Years on This Path. Shunyōdō Shoten, May 1978
- Reflections of the Old Man. Furukawa Shobō, August 1981
- Isensui’s Words. Sōunsha, January 1990
- The Man Called Hōsai. Daihōrinkaku, April 1991
- Issa Reflections. Kodansha Literary Bunko, March 2000
- Isensui Diary: Youth Edition (2 vols.). Chikuma Shobō, 2003

=== Other Works ===
- Street Trees (Art collection). Sōunsha, 1919
- Bashō Bunko: Revised Annotated Edition Vols. 2–8. Shunyōdō, 1922–24
- Complete Record of Bashō’s Haiku. Shūeikaku, 1922
- Ora ga Haru / My Spring Collection (Issa). Iwanami Bunko, 1927
- Haijin Reader (editor). Shunjūsha, 1931–32
- The Diary of My Father’s Final Days (Issa’s posthumous manuscript). Iwanami Bunko, 1934
- New Edition: Issa Haiku Collection. Iwanami Bunko, 1935
- Free-Verse Haiku Collection. Kaizōsha, 1940 (co-selected with Naka Tsuka Ippeirō)
- Suigō / Bōsō (editor). Hōbunkan, 1959
- Talking about Santōka. Chōbunsha, 1972 (co-edited with Itō Kango)
- Introduction to Short Poetry. Chōbunsha, 1973 (co-authored with Hashimoto Kenzō)

=== Translation ===
- Goethe: Recorded Sayings and Deeds. Seikyōsha, 1910

=== School Songs ===
- Iwanai Nishi Elementary School (Hokkaidō, 1951). Composed by Ikuma Dan
- Niijima Elementary School (Tokyo, 1951). Composed by Ikuma Dan
- Gofuku Elementary School (Toyama, 1955). Composed by Ikuma Dan
- Kita-Kazumi Elementary School (Toyama). Composed by Ikuma Dan
- Atsuta High School (Nagoya, 1955). Composed by Ikuma Dan
- Toyomasa Junior High School (Nagoya). Composed by Ikuma Dan
- Toi Junior High School (Shizuoka)

== See also ==
- Japanese literature
- List of Japanese authors

== General bibliography ==
- "My Resume Volume 4" Nihon Keizai Shimbun 1957, pp. 97–124
- Ueda, Makoto. Modern Japanese Poets and the Nature of Literature. Stanford University Press (1983). ISBN 0804711666
