= Kawahigashi Hekigotō =

Japanese poet and writer

- 河東 碧梧桐
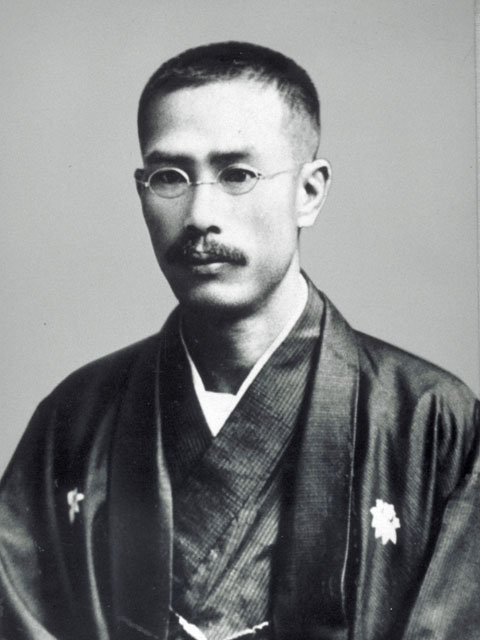
- Born: Kawahigashi Heigorō (河東 秉五郎); 26 February 1873; Matsuyama
- Died: 1 February 1937; Tokyo
- Occupations: Haiku poet, calligrapher

Kawahigashi Hekigotō (河東 碧梧桐; February 26, 1873 – February 1, 1937), birth name Kawahigashi Heigorō (河東 秉五郎), was a Japanese poet and modern pioneer of the haiku form.

== Biography ==
Kawahigashi Hekigotō was born in Matsuyama. He was the son of a Confucian scholar and his childhood was steeped in the Chinese classics. He was a childhood friend of the poet and novelist Kyoshi Takahama. Kawahigashi and Kyoshi left school together in 1894 and moved to Tokyo.

Hekigotō and Kyoshi became the chief disciples of the modern haiku master Shiki Masaoka. Kawahigashi succeeded Shiki as haiku editor of the magazine Hototogisu ("Cuckoo") in 1897 and the newspaper Nippon ("Japan") in 1902. After Shiki's death, Kawahigashi and Kyoshi became leaders of two factions of Shiki's followers, the latter more conservative and eventually the journal Hototogisu became centered on this aesthetic, while the former was more zealous and experimental. Kawahigashi extended the innovations of Shiki and abandoned the 5-7-5 syllable pattern of 17 on in favor of free verse and calling his verse tanshi instead of haiku. He continued to use the seasonal word (kigo), but some of his followers even abandoned that.

In 1917, Kawahigashi wrote:

Any arbitrary attempt to mould a poem into the 5-7-5 syllable pattern would damage the freshness of impression and kill the vitality of language. We sought to be direct in expression, since we valued our fresh impressions and wanted our language to be vital. This soon led us to destroy the fixed verse form and to gain the utmost freedom of expression.

Among Kawahigashi's works are two books of commentary, Haiku hyōshaku (1899) and Shoku haiku hyōshaku (1899), and the haiku collection Hekigotō kushū (1916). Kawahigashi was also a travel writer, publishing Sanzenri ("Three Thousand ri") in 1906. He visited Europe and America in 1921 and China and Mongolia in 1924. Kawahigashi was also a journalist, calligrapher, art critic, noh dancer, and mountaineer.

Hekigotō Kawahigashi died on 1 February 1937 in Tokyo.
