= Uejima Onitsura =

Japanese poet

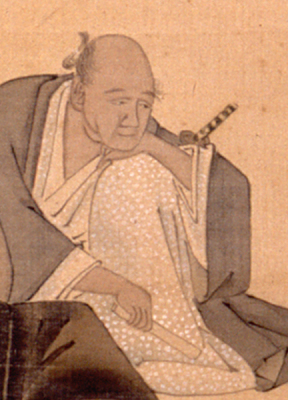
Uejima Onitsura

Uejima Onitsura (上島 鬼貫; April 1661 – 2 August 1738) was a Japanese haiku poet of the Edo period. Prominent in Osaka and belonging to the Danrin school of Japanese poetry, Uejima is credited, along with other Edo period poets, of helping to define and exemplify Bashō's style of poetry.

== Biography ==
Born to a family of brewers in Itami (present-day Hyōgo Prefecture), Uejima showed exceptional talent in poetry at the age of eight.

At the age of 25, Uejima moved to Osaka, where he began his professional career in haiku and other forms of poetry.

In later life he worked as a masseur, before becoming a priest.

== Hitorigoto ==
In his meditation on the art of haiku, Hotorigoto, Onitsura maintained that the best way to learn to write haiku was to first imitate one's teacher, and then to develop one's own style.

He also considered makoto or sincerity to be the key to humanity, and to the humane writing of poetry; and urged the application of the best principles of classic Japanese poetry to haiku, so as to ensure its artistic quality.

== Legacy ==
Unlike Bashō, Uejima had few direct disciples. However he continued to have a broad influence upon the writing of haiku, one exponent opposing him to his own actual teacher, Ryōta:

“Onitsura said, ‘Face it that way.’ Ryōta said, ‘Face it this way.’ Oh, what can I do....”.

== See also ==
- Robert Frost
- Saigyō
