= Robert H. Brower =

American linguist

- Born: March 23, 1923; Cambridge, Massachusetts
- Died: February 29, 1988 (aged 64)
- Education: University of Michigan
- Occupation: Professor at the University of Michigan
- Years active: 1966–1988
- Spouse(s): Sally Brower, ?–1988

Robert H. Brower (March 23, 1923 – February 29, 1988) was a professor of Far East Language and Literature, Japanese Language and Literature, chair of Far East Language and Literature at the University of Michigan from 1966 to 1988.

== Life as a student ==
Professor Brower was born on March 23, 1923, in Cambridge, Massachusetts. He received his bachelor's degree from Harvard University in 1944. He learned Japanese while serving with the armed forces in World War II, and received his master's and doctoral degrees from the University of Michigan in 1947 and 1952, respectively.

== Teaching ==
He returned to Michigan in 1966 after teaching at the University of Minnesota and Stanford University. As the chairman of the Department of Far Eastern Languages and Literatures from 1971 to 1981, he was instrumental in expanding Michigan's reputation as a major center for Japanese studies.

Brower joined the Department of Far Eastern Languages and Literatures at the University of Michigan in 1966, and served as chairman of the department from 1971 through 1981. He served in the professorial ranks at Stanford University from 1954 through 1966, and in 1963–64 he served as director of the Inter-University Center for Japanese Language Studies in Tokyo. He taught at the University of Minnesota from 1951 through 1954. Brower was an internationally recognized authority on traditional Japanese literature, especially poetry. His book Japanese Court Poetry, written in collaboration with Earl Miner, was one of the first critical examinations in English of the poetry of the Japanese imperial court from the sixth through the 14th centuries, and was the seminal work in his specialty, classical poetry and poetics. First published in 1976, it remains a standard text for students of Japanese literature. Brower was a Fulbright Senior Research Fellow in Japan in 1962–63. He also received research grants from the National Endowment for the Humanities, the Rockefeller Foundation, and the Japan Foundation. He was president of the Association of Teachers of Japanese, 1971–74, and a member of the Association of Asian Studies and the American Oriental Society. In 1987, Brower's former students established a small endowment, on the occasion of his retirement, to honor and memorialize his many contributions to the field of Japanese literature. The fund is designated to support the purchase of select volumes on classical Japanese literature. The fund is managed by the Center for Japanese Studies. Upon his death, it was his widow Sally Brower's wish that friends and family members give donations to the Robert H. Brower Library Fund, in lieu of flowers or gifts.

== Death ==
At the time of his death, Brower was at work on a series of translations of poetic treatises, which promised to reveal how Japanese poets regarded their own art.

Robert H. Brower died on Monday, February 29, 1988.

== Bibliography ==
- Brower, Robert H.; Miner, Earl (1961). Japanese Court Poetry (Stanford Studies in the Civilizations of Eastern Asia). Stanford: Stanford University Press. OCLC 326761.
- Brower, Robert H.; Miner, Earl (1967). Fujiwara Teika's 'Superior Poems of Our Time': A Thirteenth-Century Poetic Treatise and Sequence. Stanford: Stanford University Press. ISBN 0-8047-0171-7.
