= Mukai Kyorai =

Japanese poet

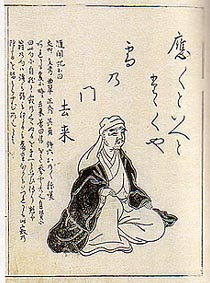
Drawing of Mukai Kyorai

Mukai Kyorai (向井 去来; 1651 – 8 October 1704) was a Japanese haiku poet, and a close disciple of Matsuo Bashō.

== Family and character ==
A physician's son, Kyorai was born in Nagasaki to a samurai family. Fond of the martial arts, he was after his death described as having "a soft part and a hard part at the same time".

His wife Kana-jo and sister Chine-jo were also notable haiku writers.

== As poet ==
Kyorai connected with Bashō in the 1680s, at the time when the latter was developing his theories of sabi, by which Kyorai was strongly influenced.

In 1691 he was one of the compilers, together with Nozawa Bonchō, of the Sarumino (Monkey's Straw Raincoat) Bashō-school collection. After Bashō's death he produced Kyoraishō, a rich source for the ideas of, and anecdotes about, his master.

== See also ==
- Hattori Ransetsu
- Takarai Kikaku
