= Ozaki Hōsai =

Japanese poet

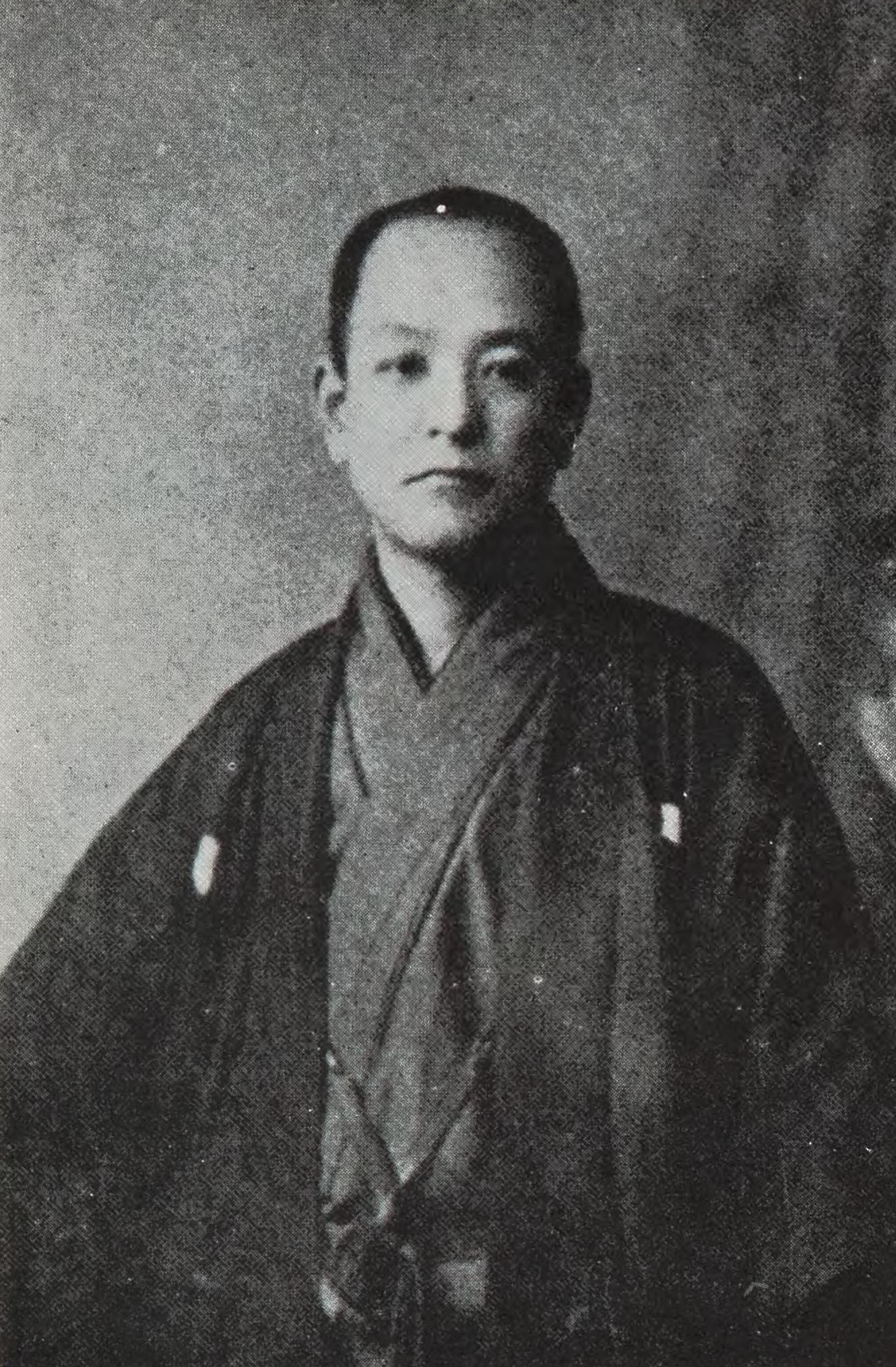

Ozaki Hōsai (尾崎 放哉, 20 January 1885 – 7 April 1926) was the haigo (haikai pen name) of Ozaki Hideo, a Japanese poet of the late Meiji and Taishō periods of Japan. An alcoholic, Ozaki witnessed the birth of the modern free verse haiku movement. His verses are permeated with loneliness, most likely a result of the isolation, poverty and poor health of his final years.

== Biography ==
Ozaki was born in what is now part of Tottori city in Tottori prefecture. Ozaki's interest in haiku and writing began at an early age, and he was influenced by the pioneer of free verse style haiku, Ogiwara Seisensui, while still in high school.

Ozaki attended the prestigious Tokyo Imperial University, graduating on 16 October 1909. During this period he proposed marriage to Yoshie Sawa (沢芳衛, Sawa Yoshie), a long-time friend and distant maternal relative. Unfortunately for Ozaki, her older brother opposed the marriage, believing that this maternal connection was too close. Nearly immediately following the failure of this rejection, Ozaki's heavy drinking, which would continue for much of his life, began. Many writers believe that the rejection was the initial cause of his later alcoholism. (Ishi, p. 56) Although he had previously been using the pen name of "Hōsai" written with the characters "芳哉", during this period he gradually shifted to using "放哉" (pronounced identically). This change is perhaps significant, as the former character, which appears in Yoshie's name, was changed to one meaning "to release, set free, banish, liberate."

After graduation, Ozaki joined the Nihon Tsūshin Company (日本通信社) in October, 1909, but was fired one month later due to incompetence.

The following year, Ozaki joined the Tōyō Life Insurance Company (東洋生命保険会社), (the predecessor to Asahi Mutual Life Insurance Co) where for a time he led a seemingly successful career. After several promotions, he married a 19-year-old woman named Kaoru (馨) in 1911. Shortly thereafter, one of his subordinates described Ozaki as "reeking of alcohol beginning each morning." (Ueda, p. 81) During the same period, although all of the other employees wore business suits, Ozaki owned no clothing other than a tuxedo and a pair of pajamas. He wore both to work. (Ueda, p. 82) In spite of this, he was promoted to Contract Section Chief (契約課長, keiyaku kacho), likely due to well-placed connections. (Ishi, p. 60)

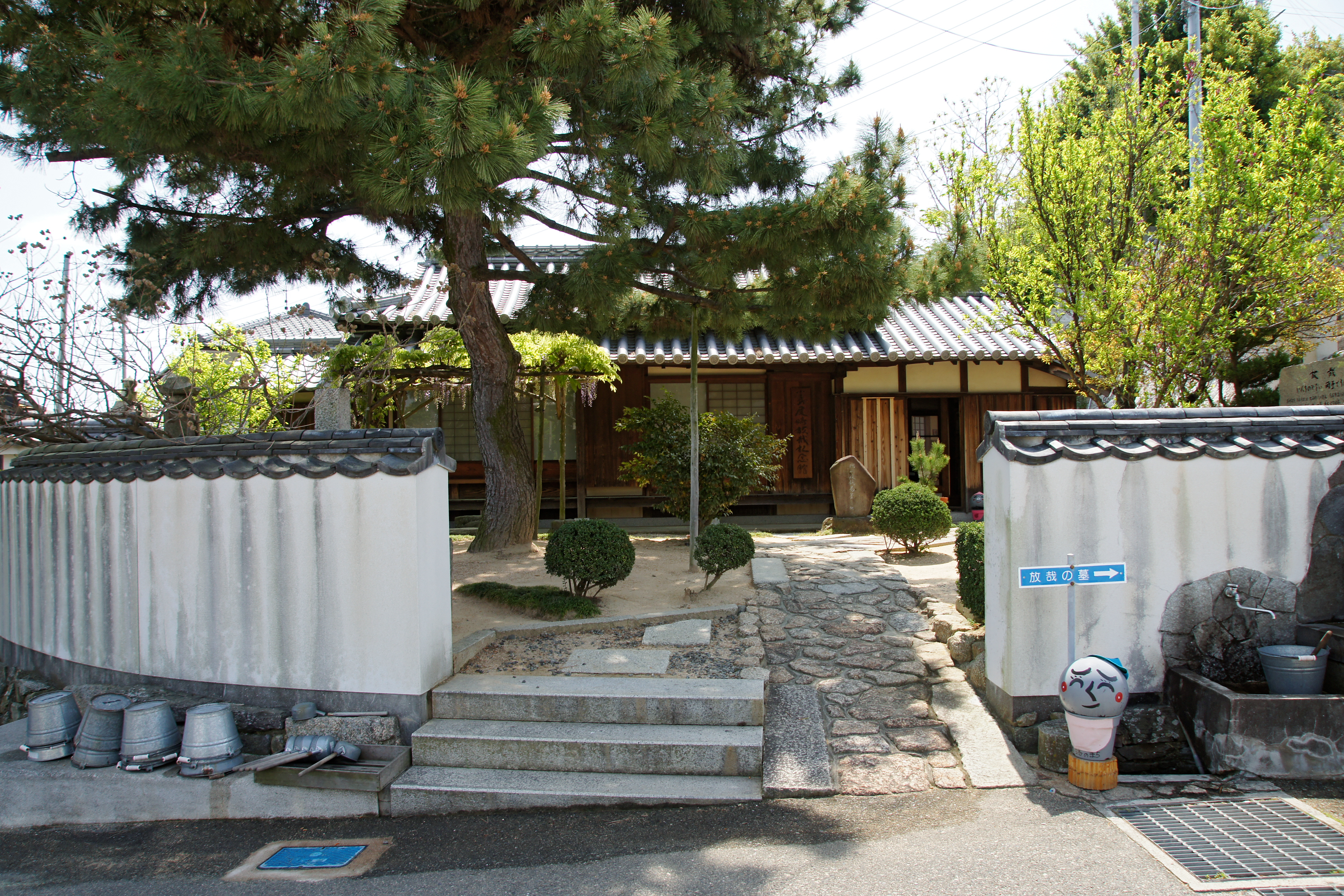
Minango-an, Shodoshima Hosai Ozaki Memorial Museum

Ozaki's problems with alcohol continued to worsen, and he left Tōyō in 1920 at the age of 36. He became a lay mendicant monk at a Buddhist training center. In 1926, he settled on the island of Shōdoshima, Kagawa Prefecture, in the Inland Sea, and was given the post of rector of the small hermitage of Minango-an at the temple of Saiko-ji. With ties from his former life severed, and without any material possessions, he began to write haiku in earnest. His only book, Daikū (大空, Big Sky), contains poems of his solitary final years, and was selected by Ogiwara Seisensui from the over 4,000 haiku composed by Ozaki between 1916 and 1926. The collection was published posthumously in 1926, and in an expanded edition in 1945. Portions are available in English translation by Hiroaki Sato entitled Right under the big sky, I don't wear a hat (ISBN 1-880656-05-1).

== Works ==
Ozaki's Collected Works (全集, Zenshū) are not currently available in English translation.
