= Nozawa Bonchō =

Japanese writer

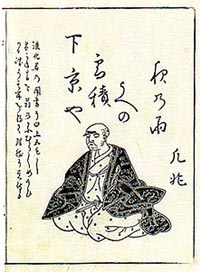
Bonchō portrait

Nozawa Bonchō (野沢 凡兆; 1640–1714) was a Japanese haikai poet. He was born in Kanazawa, and spent most of his life in Kyoto working as a doctor. Bonchō was one of Matsuo Bashō's leading disciples and, together with Kyorai, he edited the Bashō school's Monkey's Raincoat (Sarumino) anthology of 1689. He participated in numerous renku with Bashō and other members of his Shōmon school.

A famous hokku by Bonchō:

市中は物のにほひや夏の月 Machinaka ha / mono no nioi ya / natsu no tsuki

Downtown
the smells of things…
summer moon
(trans. Sean Price)
