= Earl Miner =

American orientalist and academic (1927–2004)

Professor Earl Miner at Princeton

Earl Roy Miner (February 21, 1927 – April 17, 2004) was a professor at Princeton University, and a noted scholar of Japanese literature and especially Japanese poetry; he was also active in early modern English literature (for instance, his obituary in The New York Times notes that a critical edition of John Milton's Paradise Lost was in the process of being published when he died). He was a major critical authority on John Dryden. He earned his bachelor's degree in Japanese studies and master's and doctoral degrees in English from the University of Minnesota; with this PhD, he joined the English faculty at Williams College (1953–1955) and at UCLA (1955–1972), whereupon he joined Princeton in 1972.

Miner was president of the Milton Society of America, the American Society for 18th Century Studies and the International Comparative Literature Association. He was honored with Princeton's Behrman Award for distinguished achievement in the humanities in 1993.

In 1994, the Japanese government conferred the Order of the Rising Sun, Gold Rays with Neck Ribbon, which represents the third highest of eight classes associated with this award.

After a prolonged illness, Miner died in his home in Hightstown, New Jersey, on April 17, 2004.

== Selected works ==
In a statistical overview derived from writings by and about Miner, OCLC/WorldCat encompasses roughly 100+ works in 300+ publications in 8 languages and 20,000+ library holdings.

- The Japanese tradition in British and American literature, Earl Miner. 1958 Princeton University Press, ISBN 0837188180
- Japanese Court Poetry, Earl Miner, Robert H. Brower. 1961, Stanford University Press, LCCN 61-10925
- Fujiwara Teika's Superior Poems of Our Time, trans. Robert H. Brower, Earl Miner. 1967, Stanford University Press, L.C. 67-17300, ISBN 0-8047-0171-7
- Dryden's Poetry, by Earl Miner. 1967, Indiana University Press
- An Introduction to Japanese Court Poetry, by Earl Miner. 1968, Stanford University Press, LCCN 68-17138
- The Cavalier mode from Jonson to Cotton, by Earl Miner. 1971, Princeton University Press, ISBN 0-691-06209-9
- Literary Uses of Typology from the Late Middle Ages to the Present, ed. Earl Miner. 1977 Princeton University Press, ISBN 978-0-691-06327-0
- Japanese Linked Poetry, by Earl Miner. 1979, Princeton University Press, ISBN 0-691-06372-9
- The Monkey’s Straw Raincoat and Other Poetry of the Basho School, trans. Earl Miner and Hiroko Odagiri. 1981, Princeton University Press, ISBN 978-0-691-06460-4
- Comparative Poetics: An Intercultural Essay on Theories of Literature, Earl Miner. 1990 Princeton University Press, ISBN 978-0-691-01490-6
- Naming Properties: Nominal Reference in Travel Writings by Basho and Sora, Johnson and Boswell, by Earl Miner. 1996, University of Michigan Press, ISBN 0-472-10699-6
- Paradise Lost, 1668-1968: Three Centuries of Commentary, ed. by: Earl Roy Miner, William Moeck, Steven Jablonski. 2004, Bucknell University Press, ISBN 0-8387-5577-1
- Japanese Poetic Diaries, Earl Miner. 2004 University of California Press, ISBN 0-520-03047-8

== Honors ==
- Order of the Rising Sun, Gold Rays and Neck Ribbon, 1994.
- Howard T. Behrmann Prize, 1993.
- Koizumi Yakumo Prize, 1991.
- Yamagato Banto Prize, 1988.
- Guggenheim Fellowship, 1977-1978.
- ACLS Fellowship, 1963.
- Fulbright Lectureships, 1960–1961, 1966–1967, 1985.
