= Enkō-ji =

Zen Buddhist temple in Kyoto, Japan

Enkōji 圓光寺
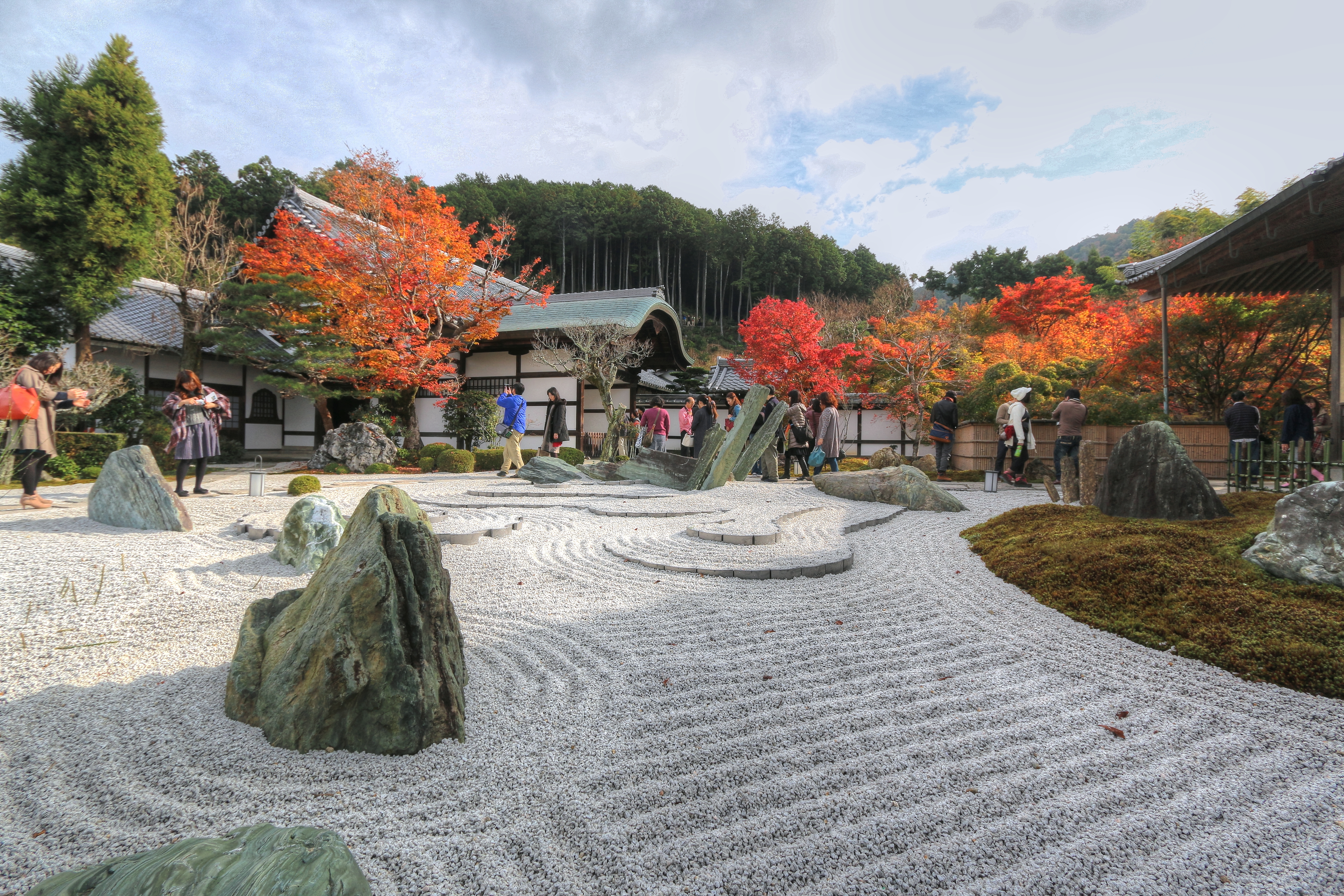

Religion
- Affiliation: Nanzen-ji Rinzai
- Deity: Senju Kannon (Thousand-armed Avalokiteśvara)

Location
- Location: 13 Ichijōji Kotanichō, Sakyō-ku, Kyōto, Kyoto Prefecture
- Country: Japan
- Interactive map of Enkōji 圓光寺
- Coordinates: 35°2′42″N 135°47′49″E

Architecture
- Founder: Tokugawa Ieyasu and Sanyō Genkitsu
- Completed: 1601

Website
- http://www.enkouji.jp/

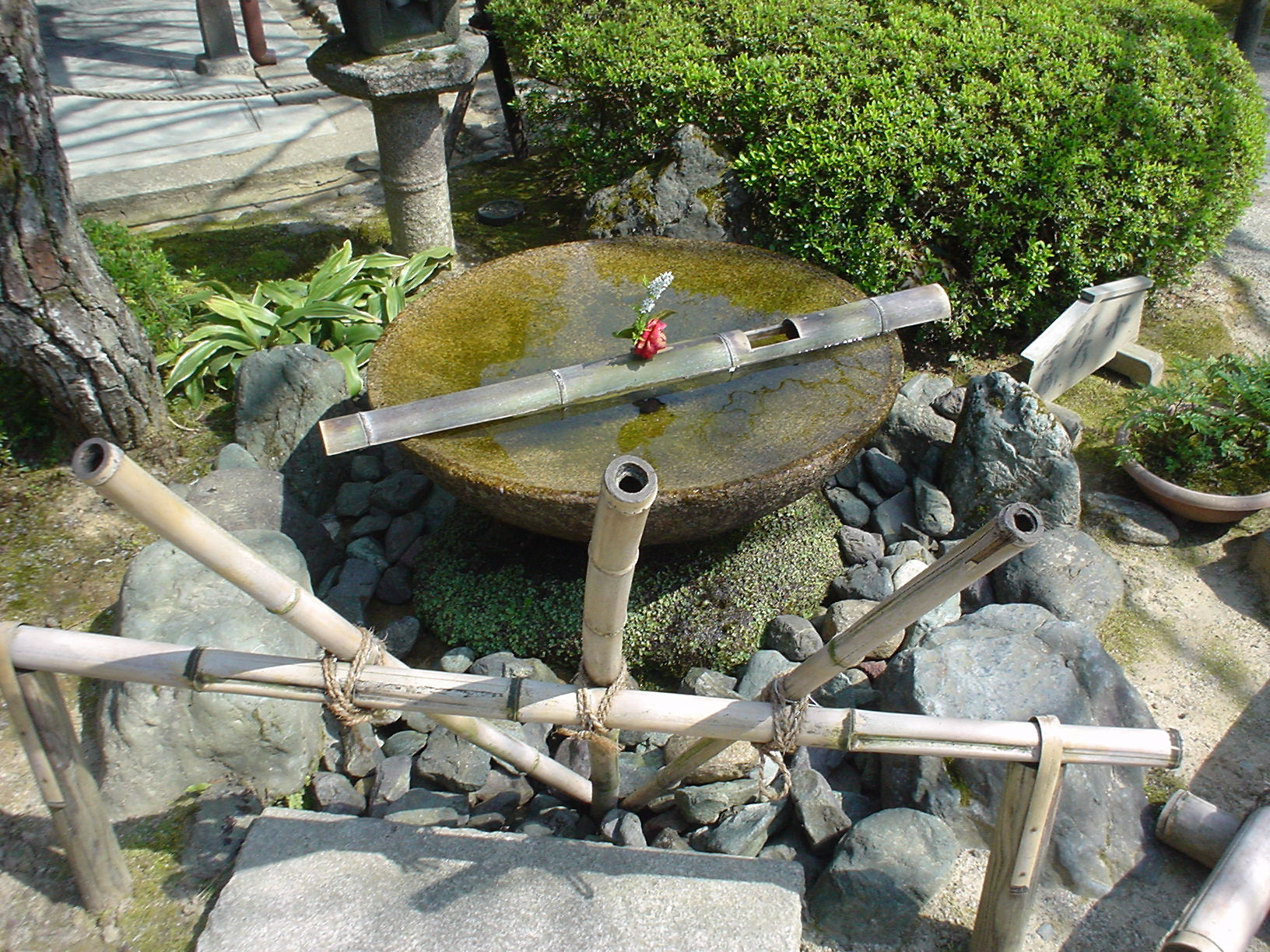
The suikinkutsu at Enkō-ji

Enkō-ji (圓光寺), is a Zen Buddhist temple located near the Shugakuin Imperial Villa at Sakyō-ku, Ichijo-ji, Kotani-cho, in northeast Kyoto, Japan. It is famous for its fall foliage and suikinkutsu.

== Gallery ==
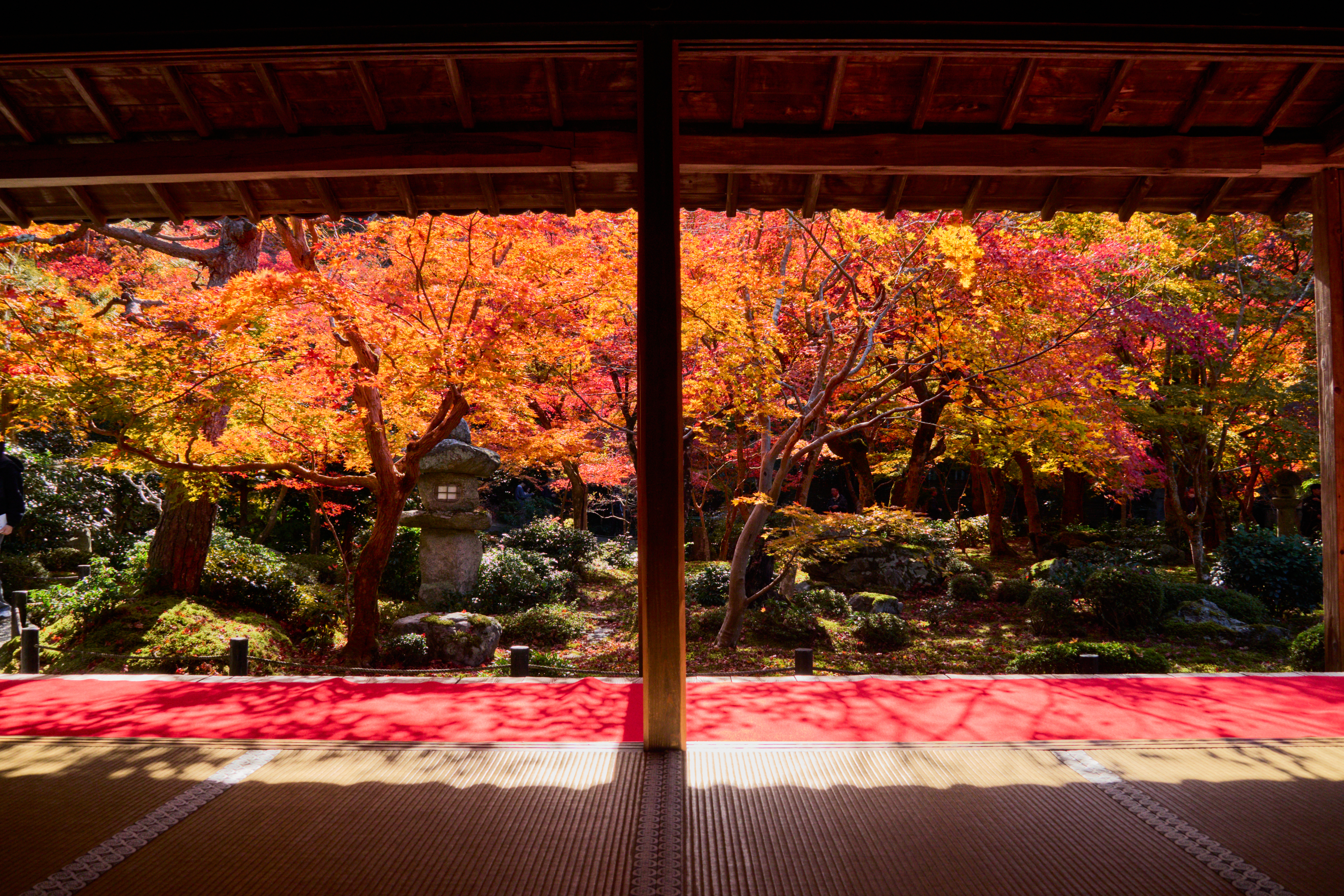

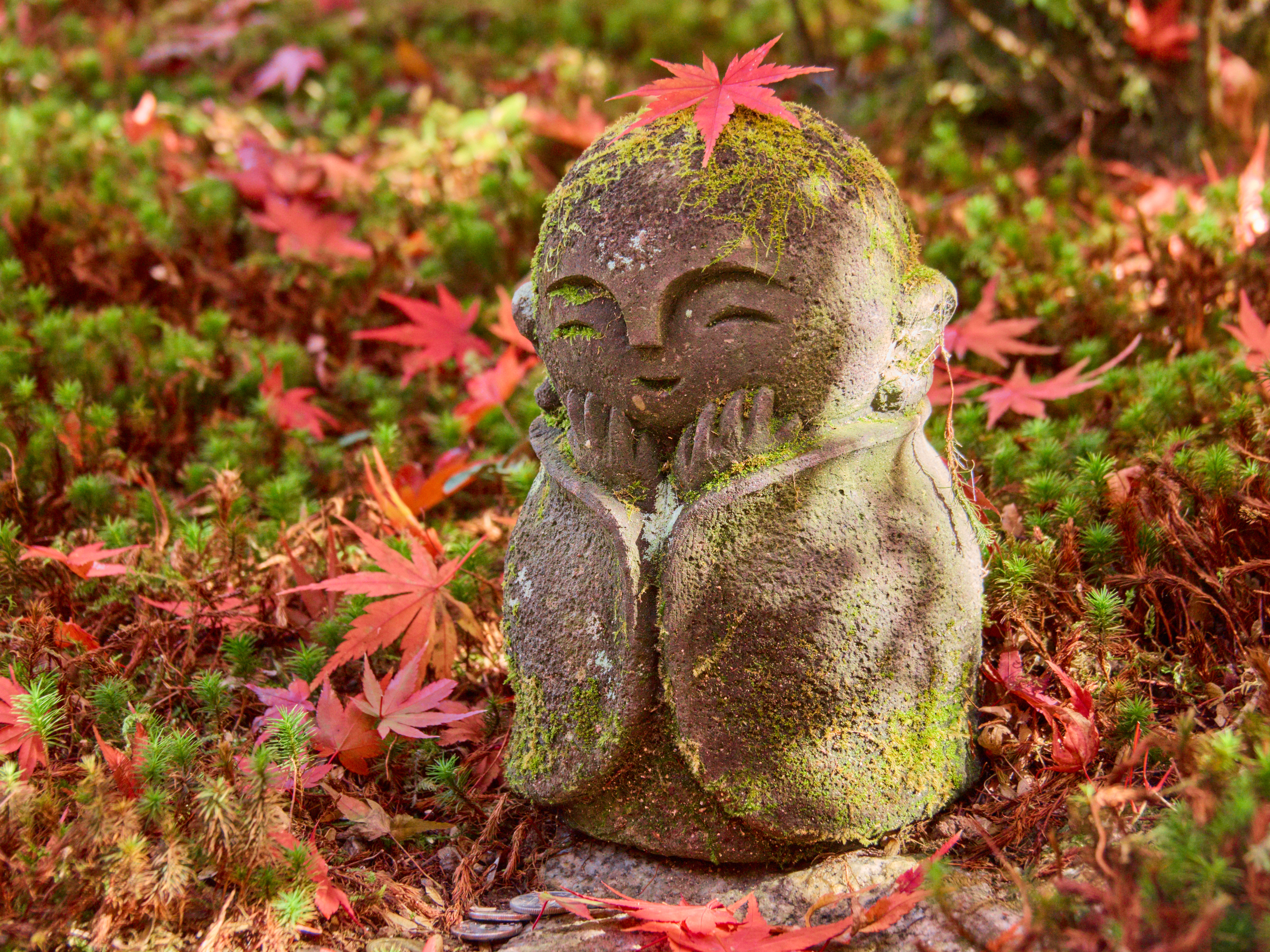

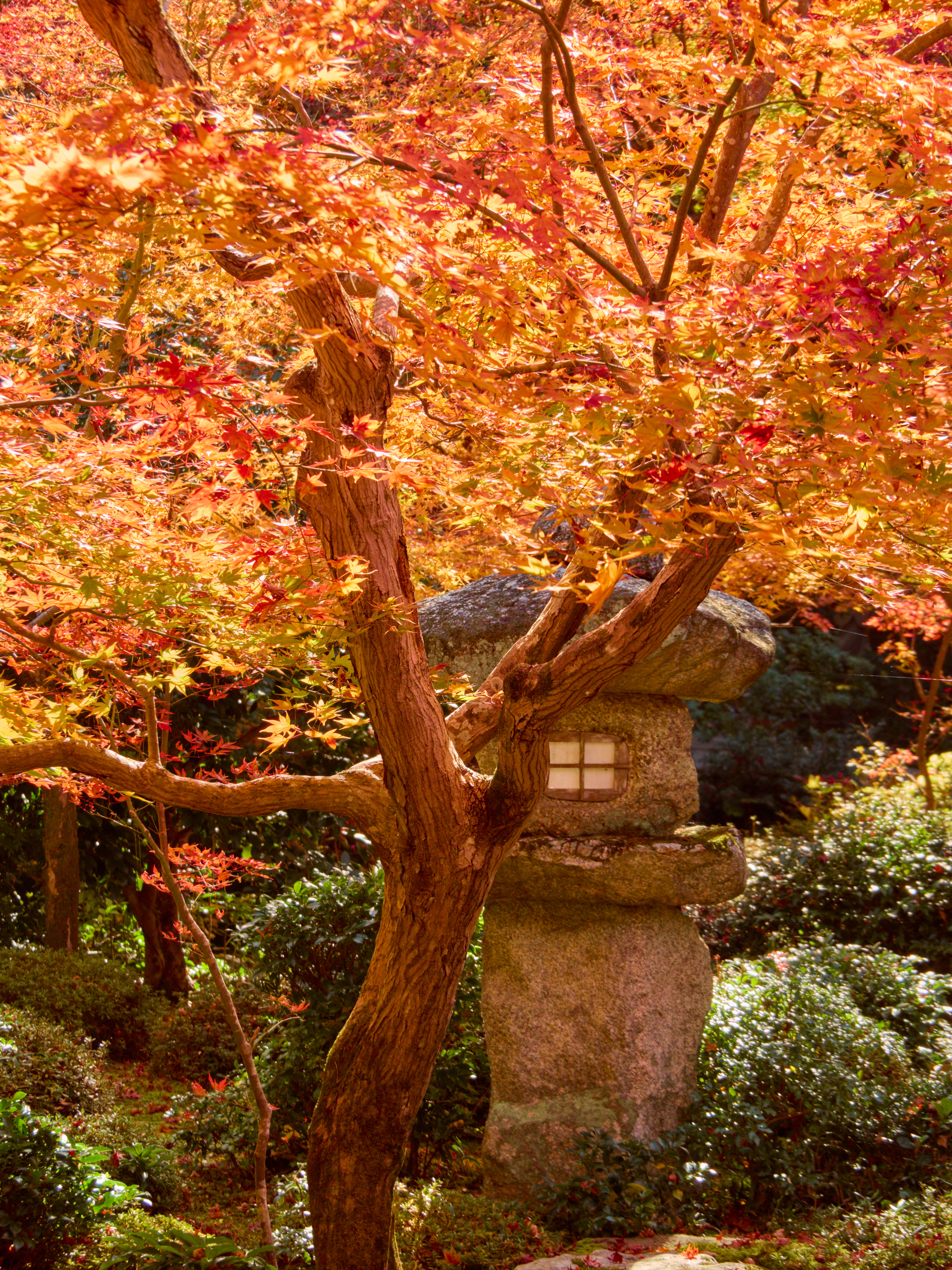

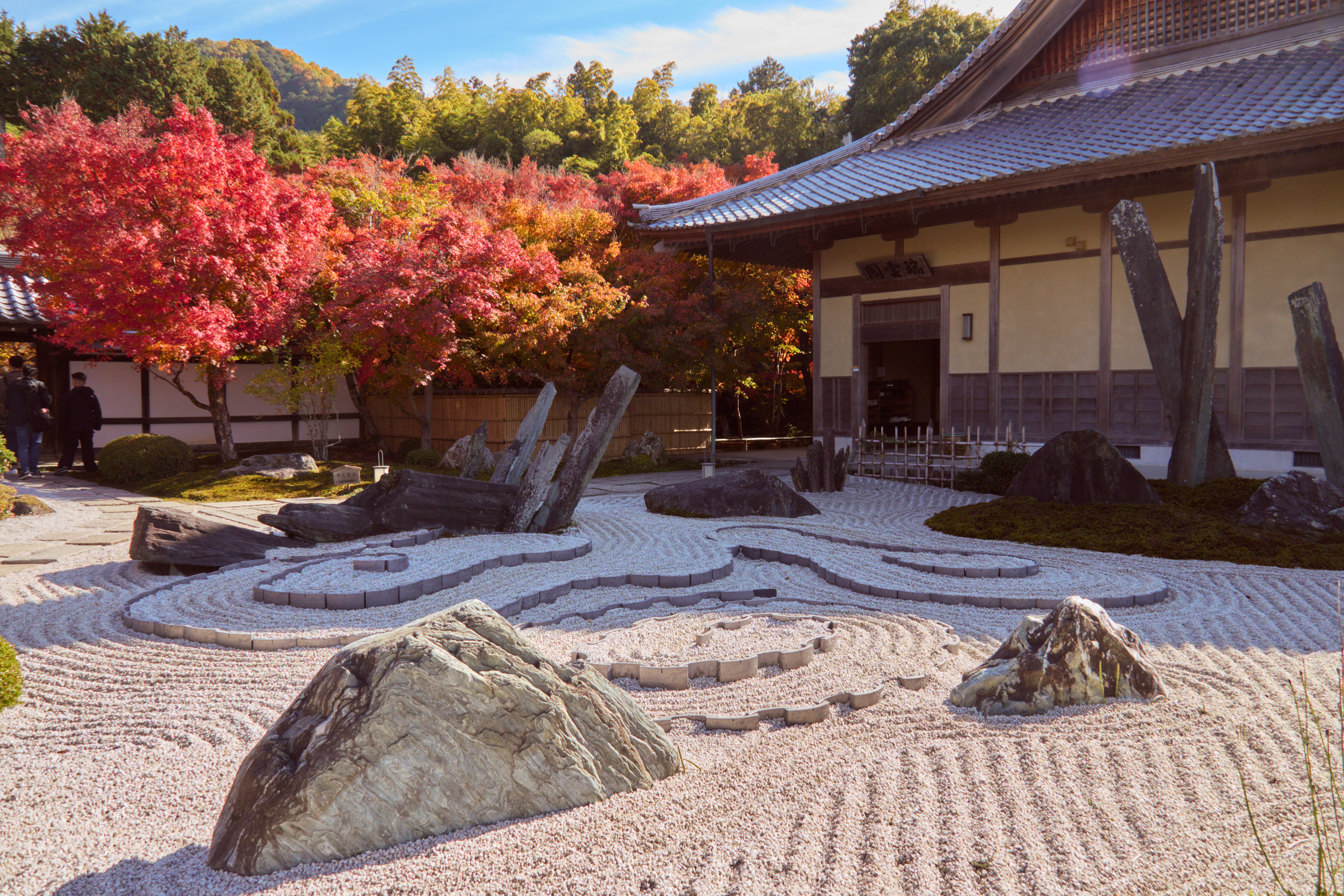

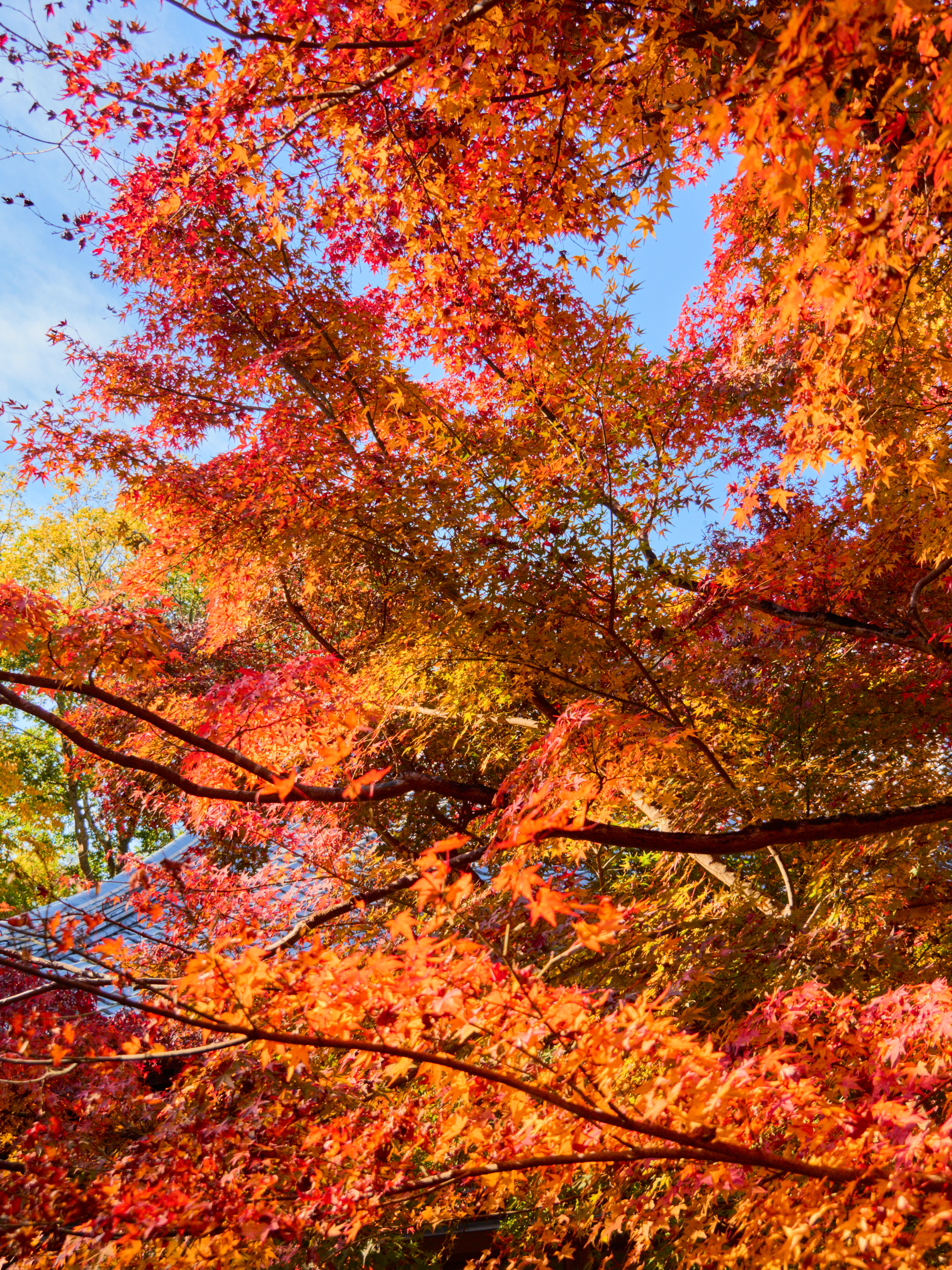

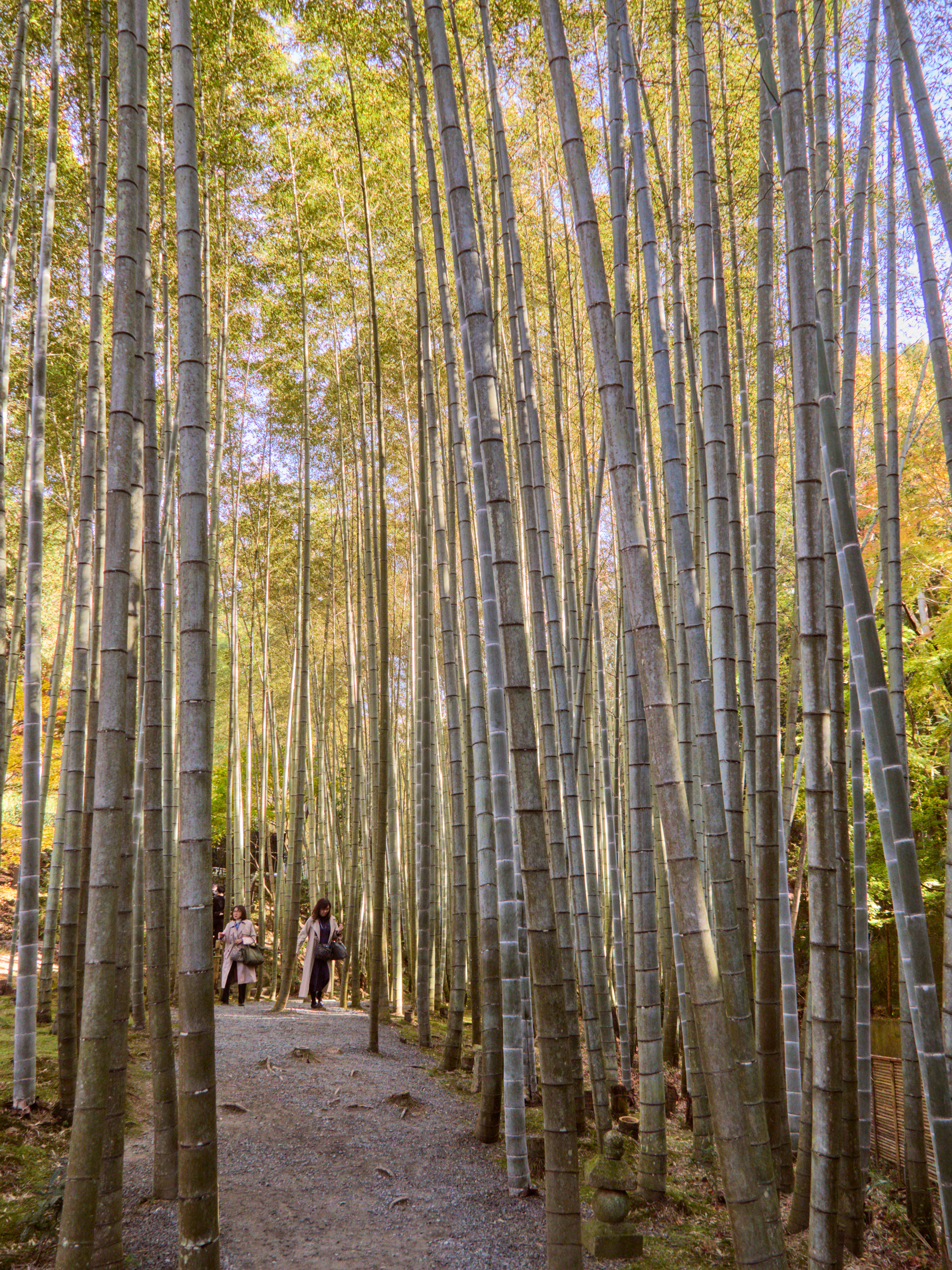

== See also ==
- List of Buddhist temples in Kyoto
