= Hattori Ransetsu =

Japanese poet

Hattori Ransetsu (1654–1707) was an Edo samurai who became a haikai poet under the guidance of Matsuo Bashō.

R. H. Blyth considered Ransetsu to be Bashō's most representative follower.

== Poetry ==
Ransetsu's poetry is low-keyed and austere, reflecting the sabi aspect of Bashō's writing, but showing a real empathy with all living creatures.

A critical contemporary called him "a man of small calibre...he seems to have flowers, but has no fruit".

R. H. Blyth would later partially concur, saying that "even his death verse, beautiful and justly famous as it is, has something nerveless about it:

A leaf falls,

Totsu! Another leaf falls,

Carried by the wind".

== Diary ==
Ransetsu wrote a diary about his 1705 travels in Southern Japan, highlighting such exotic features as "snake-strawberries", and "southern barbarians, be they devils or be they human beings".

== See also ==
- Mukai Kyorai
- Takarai Kikaku
