= Takarai Kikaku =

Japanese poet

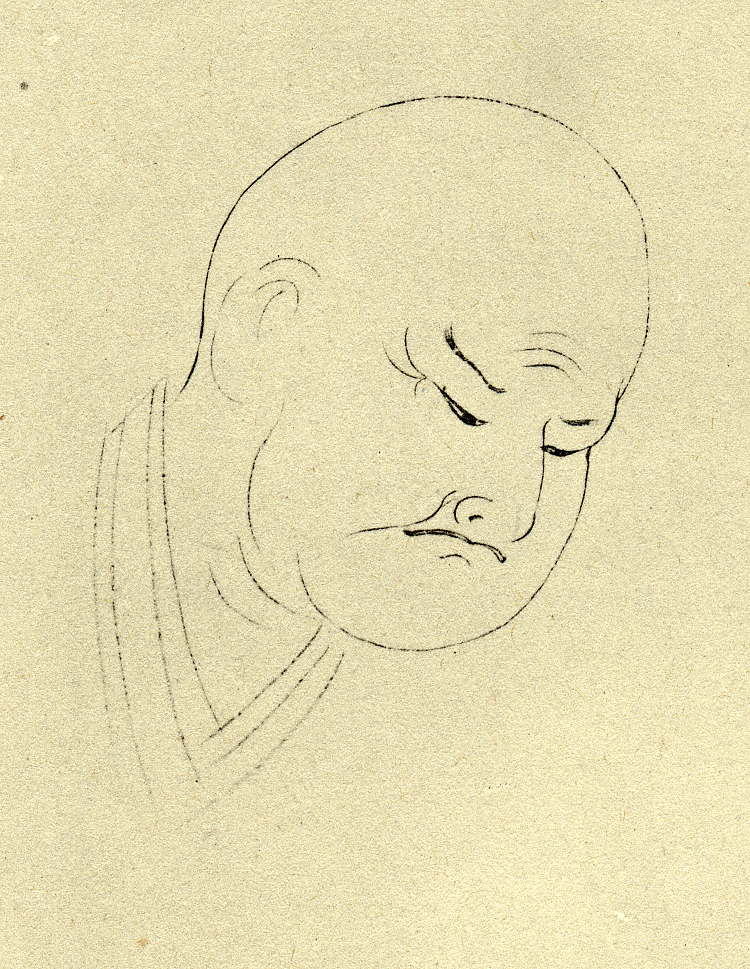
Portrait by Oguri Kanrei (小栗寛令)

Takarai Kikaku (Japanese: 宝井其角; 1661–1707) also known as Enomoto Kikaku, was a Japanese haikai poet and among the most accomplished disciples of Matsuo Bashō.

== Early life ==
His father was an Edo doctor, but Kikaku chose to become a professional haikai poet rather than follow in his footsteps.

== Literary career ==
Kikaku set the tone for haikai from Basho's death until the time of Yosa Buson in the late 18th century. He also left an important historical document describing Bashō's final days, and the immediate aftermath of his death, which has been translated into English.

== Later influence ==
In commemoration of the 300th anniversary of Kikaku's death, Nobuyuki Yuasa led an international bilingual (Japanese and English) renku, or collaborative linked poem, which opened with the following hokku by Kikaku:

鐘ひとつ賣れぬ日はなし江戸の春

Springtime in Edo,
Not a day passes without
A temple bell sold.

== Bashō's criticism ==
- Kikaku wrote of coarser subjects than Bashō, and in this respect his poetry was closer to earlier haikai, as well as to senryu, and his master is known to have denigrated Kikaku's 'flippant efforts'.
- Comparing Kikaku's paired haiku in 'The Rustic Haiku Contest', Bashō remarked of one that "these are artifices within a work of art; too much craft has been expended here".
- One day, Kikaku composed a haiku,

Red dragonfly / break off its wings / Sour cherry

which Bashō changed to,

Sour cherry / add wings to it / Red dragonfly;

thus saying that poetry should add life to life, not take life away from life.

== See also ==
- Hattori Ransetsu
- Mukai Kyorai
