= Hokku =

Poetry form

Hokku (発句; lit. 'starting verse') is the opening stanza of a Japanese orthodox collaborative linked poem, renga, or of its later derivative, renku (haikai no renga). From the time of Matsuo Bashō (1644–1694), the hokku began to appear as an independent poem, and was also incorporated in haibun (in combination with prose). In the late 19th century, Masaoka Shiki (1867–1902) renamed the standalone hokku as "haiku", and the latter term is now generally applied retrospectively to all hokku appearing independently of renku or renga, irrespective of when they were written. The term hokku continues to be used in its original sense, as the opening verse of a linked poem.

== Content ==
Within the traditions of renga and renku, the hokku, as the opening verse of the poem, has always held a special position. It was traditional for the most honoured guest at the poetry-writing session to be invited to compose it and he would be expected to offer praise to his host and/or deprecate himself (often symbolically) while superficially referring to current surroundings and seasons. (The following verse fell to the host, who would then respond with a compliment to the guest, again, usually symbolically).

== Form ==
Typically, a hokku is 17 moras (or on) in length, composed of three metrical units of 5, 7 and 5 moras respectively. Alone among the verses of a poem, the hokku includes a kireji or "cutting-word" that appears at the end of one of its three metrical units. Like all of the other stanzas, a Japanese hokku is traditionally written in a single vertical line.

== English-language hokku ==
Paralleling the development of haiku in English, poets writing renku in English nowadays seldom adhere to a 5-7-5 syllable format for the hokku, or other chōku ('long verses'), of their poem. The salutative requirement of the traditional hokku is often disregarded, but the hokku is still typically required to include a kigo (seasonal word or phrase), and to reflect the poet's current environment.

== Example ==
Bashō composed the following hokku in 1689 during his journey through Oku (the Interior), while writing renku in the house of a station master in Sukagawa at the entrance to Michinoku, in present-day Fukushima:

ふうりゅうの初やおくの田植うた

fūryū no / hajime ya oku no / taue-uta

beginnings of poetry—
the rice planting songs
of the Interior

— (trans. Haruo Shirane)

Hearing the rice-planting songs in the fields, Bashō composed a poem that complimented the host on the elegance of his home and region—which he associated with the historical "beginnings" (hajime) of fūryū or poetic art—while suggesting his joy and gratitude at being able to compose linked verse or "poetry" (fūryū) for the "first time" (hajime) in the Interior (oku).

== See also ==
- Haikai
- Haiku
- Renga
- Renku
- Senryū
