= On (Japanese prosody) =

Japanese prosody

On (音; rarely onji) are the phonetic units in Japanese poetry. In the Japanese language, the word means "sound". It includes the phonetic units counted in haiku, tanka, and other such poetic forms. Known as "morae" to English-speaking linguists, the modern Japanese term for the linguistic concept is either haku (拍) or mōra (モーラ).

Ji (字) is Japanese for "symbol" or "character". The concatenation of the two words on and ji into onji (音字) was used by Meiji era grammarians to mean "phonic character" and was translated into English by Nishi Amane in 1870 as "letter". Since then, the term "onji" has become obsolete in Japan, and only survives in foreign-language discussion of Japanese poetry. Gilbert and Yoneoka call the use of the word "onji" "bizarre and mistaken". It was taken up after a 1978 letter to Frogpond: Journal of the Haiku Society of America decrying the then-current use of the word "jion", which itself appears to have arisen in error.

Counting on in Japanese poetry is the same as counting characters when the text is transliterated into hiragana. In cases where a hiragana is represented by a pair of symbols each pair (or "digraph" e.g. "kyo" (きょ)) equates to a single on. When viewed this way, the term "ji" ("character") is used in Japanese.

In English-language discussions of Japanese poetry, the more familiar word "syllable" is sometimes used. Although the use of "syllable" is inaccurate, it sometimes happens that the syllable count and the on count match in Japanese-language haiku. The disjunction between syllables and on becomes clearer when counting sounds in English-language versions of Japanese poetic forms, such as haiku in English. An English syllable may contain one, two or three morae and, because English word sounds are not readily representable in hiragana, a single syllable may require many more ji to be transliterated into hiragana.

There is disagreement among linguists as to the definitions of "syllable" and "mora". In contrast, ji (and hence on) is unambiguously defined by reference to hiragana.

== Examples ==
To illustrate the distinction between on and syllables, the first four of the following words each contain the same number of on, but different numbers of syllables, and the fifth shows a variant of the fourth with one less on but the same number of syllables:

rōmaji	on	hiragana	kanji	syllables	Comparison
Nagasaki	na-ga-sa-ki	な.が.さ.き	長崎	na-ga-sa-ki	4 on; 4 syllables.
Ōsaka	o-o-sa-ka	お.お.さ.か	大阪	ō-sa-ka	4 on; 3 syllables.
Tōkyō	to-u-kyo-u	と.う.きょ.う	東京	tō-kyō	4 on; 2 syllables.
Nippon	ni-p-po-n	に.っ.ぽ.ん	日本	nip-pon	4 on; 2 syllables.
Nihon	ni-ho-n	に.ほ.ん	日本	ni-hon	3 on; 2 syllables

The examples show the various ways in which hiragana differ from syllables. In Nagasaki each hiragana character represents a single on, and hence the four hiragana are also four syllables. In Ōsaka, the initial O is a long (doubled) vowel (denoted with a macron over the vowel in rōmaji), and hence counts as two on. Tōkyō includes two long vowels, which contribute two on each in Japanese but only one syllable each, which does not distinguish long vowels from short. In Nippon the doubled "P" each is pronounced separately; the final "N" is also a separate hiragana, so the two English syllables translate to four on.
