= Ogi no Shiori =

Ogi no Shiori (荻のしをり) is a Japanese dictionary of words for use in renga (linked verse). It is also known as Shirin Man'yō Ryōzai (詞林万葉良材), Shiori Ogi (しをり荻) and Shirin Kōmoku (詞林綱目). It was compiled by Nakahori Kian by around 1692, when he wrote the preface, and first entered print in 1718. It contains a total of around 3,500 entries, and was well-received due to its ease of use and comprehensiveness.

== Author and date ==
Ogi no Shiori was compiled by Nakahori Kian (中堀僖庵). Nakahori's preface to the dictionary is dated Genroku 5 (1692), and the work was first printed in 1718.

== Title ==
The primary name of the dictionary given in Yōzō Ueno's (上野 洋三 Ueno Yōzō) article on it in the Nihon Koten Bungaku Daijiten is Ogi no Shiori. It is also known as Shirin Man'yō Ryōzai, Shiori Ogi and Shirin Kōmoku.

== Contents ==
The preface states that the Shōzai-shū (匠材集) had long been in use as a renga dictionary, but that it contained many errors, and so Nakahori took it upon himself to amend it. He consulted with Nishiyama Sōin and Kuwakado Saijun (桑門西順), regarding which words should be used in renga composition and which should be avoided. While editing the dictionary he also consulted classical works such as the Kokin Wakashū, the Tales of Ise, the Tales of Yamato, the Tale of Genji, the Tale of Sagoromo, the Yakumo Mishō, the Ōgishō (奥義抄) and the Shūchūshō (袖中抄).

Entries are arranged according to their first kana letter in the iroha ordering system, but unlike other dictionaries of the time words are also searchable according to their last letter, again in the iroha system. The majority of the entries are simple, one-line definitions, but some have up to ten or twenty lines. The dictionary contains a total of around 3,500 entries.

== Reception ==
The dictionary's ease of use and concision, combined with its comprehensiveness in its inclusion of roughly 3,500 entries, made it very popular among renga poets.

== Variant texts ==
There is also an edition from Tenmei 4 (1784).

== Works cited ==
- Ueno, Yōzō (1983). "Ogi no Shiori". Nihon Koten Bungaku Daijiten 日本古典文学大辞典 (in Japanese). Vol. 1. Tokyo: Iwanami Shoten. pp. 475–476. OCLC 11917421.
