= Miura Chora =

Japanese poet

Miura Chora (Japanese: 三浦樗良, 23 May 1729 – 4 September 1780) was a Japanese poet raised in Ise, in the Mie Prefecture of Shima Province on the island of Honshu, Japan. He traveled throughout the country composing poems and helped lead the Matsuo Bashō revival movement of the eighteenth century.

== Childhood ==
Miura grew up in Shima province with an older sister and a younger brother. His father left his family during Chora's childhood, so his mother took over control of the family. She never remarried and raised her children by herself. Chora was home-schooled as a child. Being neighbors with the Taniguchi family, Chora was close friends with Yosa Buson. They met when Buson was 20 years old, and both admired Matsuo Bashō and Kobayashi Issa.

== Adulthood and death ==
In an article for the periodical Early Modern Japan, Cheryl Crowley wrote, "Chora . . . studied with disciples of Bakurin, a leader of a rural Bashō school. Chora was a successful haikai master with numerous students, although he had a reputation for being irresponsible and profligate in his ways. He spent several years in Kyoto in the early part of the 1770s, and his work frequently appears in sequences composed by Buson and his colleagues around this time." In addition, R.H. Blyth notes that “Ryoto had set up the Ise School, followed by Otsuya and others, but gradually it became worldly. He worked together with poets such as Yosa Buson (1716-1783), Takai Kitô (1741-1789), and Wada Ranzan (d.1773). Chora brought it back to the poetry and simplicity of Matsuo Bashō.”

Chora was struck with serious leukemia and died on September 4, 1780.

== Sample poems ==
Haiku

Watching the stars
through willow branches
makes me feel lonely.

A storm-wind blows
Out from among the grasses
A full moon grows

at the ancient shrine
tarnished gold-foil... and green leaves
awakening time

insects
scattering in the grasses—
sound-colours

Kasen Renga

During his life, Chora participated in many collaboratively written poems called haikai no renga, especially the 36-verse form known as kasen. He helped write the following kasen titled "Susuki Mitsu" ("Seeing Micanthus" or "Having Seen Pampas Grass") along with the poets Buson, Kitô, and Ranzan. It was later published in the Japanese anthology Kono hotori--Ichi-ya shi-kasen (この辺り一夜四歌仙).

| 1. susuki mitsu hagi ya nakaran kono hotori—Buson | I saw pampas grass. Isn't there a bush clover around here? |
| 2. kaze yori okoru aki no yu ni—Chora | Wind rises in the autumn evening. |
| 3. Fune taete yado toru nomi no futsuka zuki—Kitô | The ferry halts, I must see an inn, the second-day moon. |
| 4. kikô no moyô ippo ippen—Ranzan | While traveling, landscape changes with each step. |
| 5. Tsurayuki ga musume osanaki koro nare ya—Chora | Isn't that the time when the daughter of Tsurayuki was little? |
| 6. hajitomi omoku ame no furereba—Buson | The half-panel shutters feel heavy as rain is falling. |
| 7. sayo fukete yûzuru naraseru on'nayami—Ranzan | Deep in the night, the sound of bow strings for an ailing noble. |
| 8. ware mo isoji no shunju o shiru—Kitô | I also came to realize that I have reached fifty years old. |
| 9. nan'ji ni mo zukin kishô zo furubioke—Buson | Old brazier, shall I put a hood on you, too? |
| 10. aiseshi hachisu wa karete ato naki—Chora | The lotus flower I loved has withered away. |
| 11. kotori kite yayo uguisu no natsukashiki—Kitô | Little bird, I tell you that I miss a nightingale. |
| 12. sakazuki saseba nigeru agatame—Ranzan | When I offer a cup of wine, the country woman shyly turns away. |
| 13. wakaki mi no Hitachi no suke ni hoserarete—Buson | A young man is appointed to an office in the province of Hitachi. |
| 14. yae no sakura no rakka ippen—Kitô | A fallen petal of multi-layered cherry blossoms. |
| 15. ya o oishi ojika kete fusu kasumu yo ni—Chora | Shot by an arrow, a stag lies down on a hazy evening. |
| 16. haru mo oku aru tsuki no yama dera—Buson | Spring comes late at a mountain temple under the moon. |
| 17. ôgame no sake wa itsushika su ni narinu—Kitô | The sake wine has turned to vinegar without being noticed. |
| 18. goshaku no tsurugi uchi osetari—Chora | I have finished forging a five-foot sword. |
| 19. manjû no Tada no watamashi hiyori yoki—Buson | The moving of Mitsunaka to the Tada castle on a fine day. |
| 20. wakaba ga sue ni oki no shirakumo—Kitô | Beyond the young leaves, I see white clouds offshore. |
| 21. matsuga e wa fuji no murasaki saki nokori—Chora | On a branch of a pine tree, the purple of wisteria remains. |
| 22. nen'butsu môshite shinu bakari nari—Buson | I have nothing else but to chant the holy name and die. |
| 23. waga yama ni gokô no mukashi shinobarete—Kitô | In the mountain I reside, I reminiscence of the Emperor's visit in the past. |
| 24. nigetaru tsuru no matedo kaerazu—Chora | The escaped crane never returns even if I wait. |
| 25. zeni nakute hekijô ni shi o daishikeri—Buson | Penniless, I wrote a poem on the wall. |
| 26. hi o mochi izuru on'na uruwashi Kitô | The woman bringing out a light is beautiful. |
| 27. kurokami ni chirachira kakaru yoru no yuki—Chora | On black hair falls night snow. |
| 28. utae ni makete shoryô owaruru—Buson | Having lost a lawsuit, a man is expelled from his land. |
| 29. hiyae da mo kotoshi wa ine no tachi nobishi—Kitô | Even in the dry rice field, this year the rice grows steadily. |
| 30. matsuri no zen o narabetaru tsuki—Chora | Festival dishes are arranged under the moon. |
| 31. koakindo aki ureshisa ni tobi aruki—Buson | A humble merchant joyfully runs around on an autumn day. |
| 32. aigasa shô to uba ni tawarete—Kitô | Jokingly I invite an old woman to share my umbrella. |
| 33. inishie mo ima mo kawaranu koigusa ya—Chora | Feelings of love never change in ancient times and now. |
| 34. nani monogatari zo himete misezaru—Buson | Whatever the story, she hides and does not show. |
| 35. Kisagata no hana omoiyaru yûmagure—Ranzan | I contemplate upon the cherry blossoms of Kisagata at dusk. |
| 36. oboro ni Shiga no yama hototogisu—Kitô | A mountain cuckoo cries in the haze of dawn in Shiga. |

== Adaptations ==
Ronald Caltabiano (1959-) used one of Chora's haiku in his song "First Dream of Honeysuckle Petals Falling Alone," composed in 1978 for mezzo-soprano and piano.
