= Yamazaki Sōkan =

Japanese poet

Yamazaki Sōkan (山崎宗鑑) (1465–1553) was a renga and haikai poet from Ōmi Province, Japan. His real name was Shina Norishige, and he was also called Yasaburō; "Yamazaki Sōkan" was a pen-name (haimyō).

== Biography ==
Originally serving as a court calligrapher for the ninth Ashikaga shōgun, Ashikaga Yoshihisa, the poet became a Buddhist monk and entered seclusion following the shōgun's death in 1489. Traveling through Settsu and Yamashiro provinces, he finally settled in a place called Yamazaki. Establishing his hermitage, which he named Taigetsu-an, he adopted the name Yamazaki Sōkan. The location of this hermitage is debated, since the town of Shimamoto, Osaka, claims to contain its remains, as does the Myōkian, a temple in Ōyamazaki, Kyoto.

Sōkan left Yamazaki in 1523 and settled five years later in the town of Kan'onji in Sanuki province. On the grounds of Kōshōji, he made a hermitage for himself called Ichiya-an, where he spent the rest of his life composing poems.

Though his poems were not widely distributed at first, they were soon compiled into a text called Daitsukubashū. He also compiled and edited the Inu-tsukuba-shū (犬筑波集), another important anthology of renga and haikai. His unrefined style came to be influential and inspired the development of the danrin style of poetry, which emerged in the early 17th century.

Sōkan died in 1553, after gaining a degree of fame and wealth for his poems and calligraphy.
