= Nishiyama Sōin =

Japanese haikai-no-renga poet

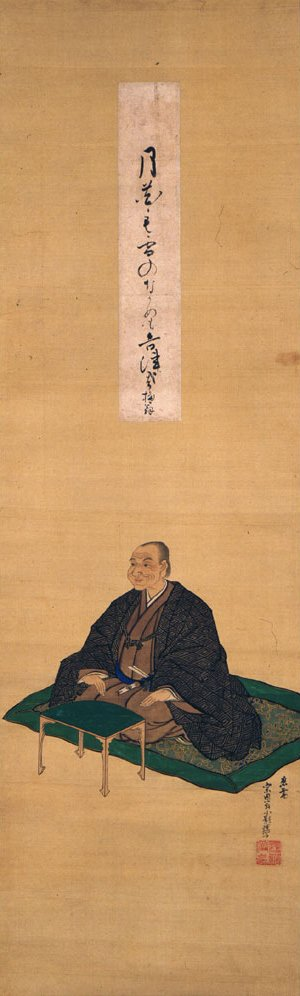
Nishiyama Sōin

Nishiyama Sōin (西山 宗因; Japanese pronunciation: [ɲi.ɕi.ja.ma (|) soꜜː.iɴ], born Nishiyama Toyoichi (西山 豊一) March 28, 1605 in Higo Province, Japan – May 5, 1682 in Kyoto) was a haikai-no-renga poet of the early Tokugawa period.

R H Blyth called Sōin "one of the Fathers of Haiku".

== Influence and importance ==
Sōin founded the Danrin school of haikai poetry, which aimed to move away from the serious 'bookishness' popular in Japanese poetry at the time and become more in touch with the common people, infusing a spirit of greater freedom into their poetry. Their poems explored the floating world of popular urban amusements in a fully colloquial style.

Sōin's haikai (comical renga) became the transition between the light and clever haikai of Matsunaga Teitoku and the more serious and aesthetic renku of Matsuo Bashō.

=== Disciples ===
Among the most important members of his school were Ichū, a versatile figure who also painted and wrote waka, and Saikaku.

== See also ==
- Haiga
