= Sasaki Takauji =

Japanese poet, warrior and bureaucrat

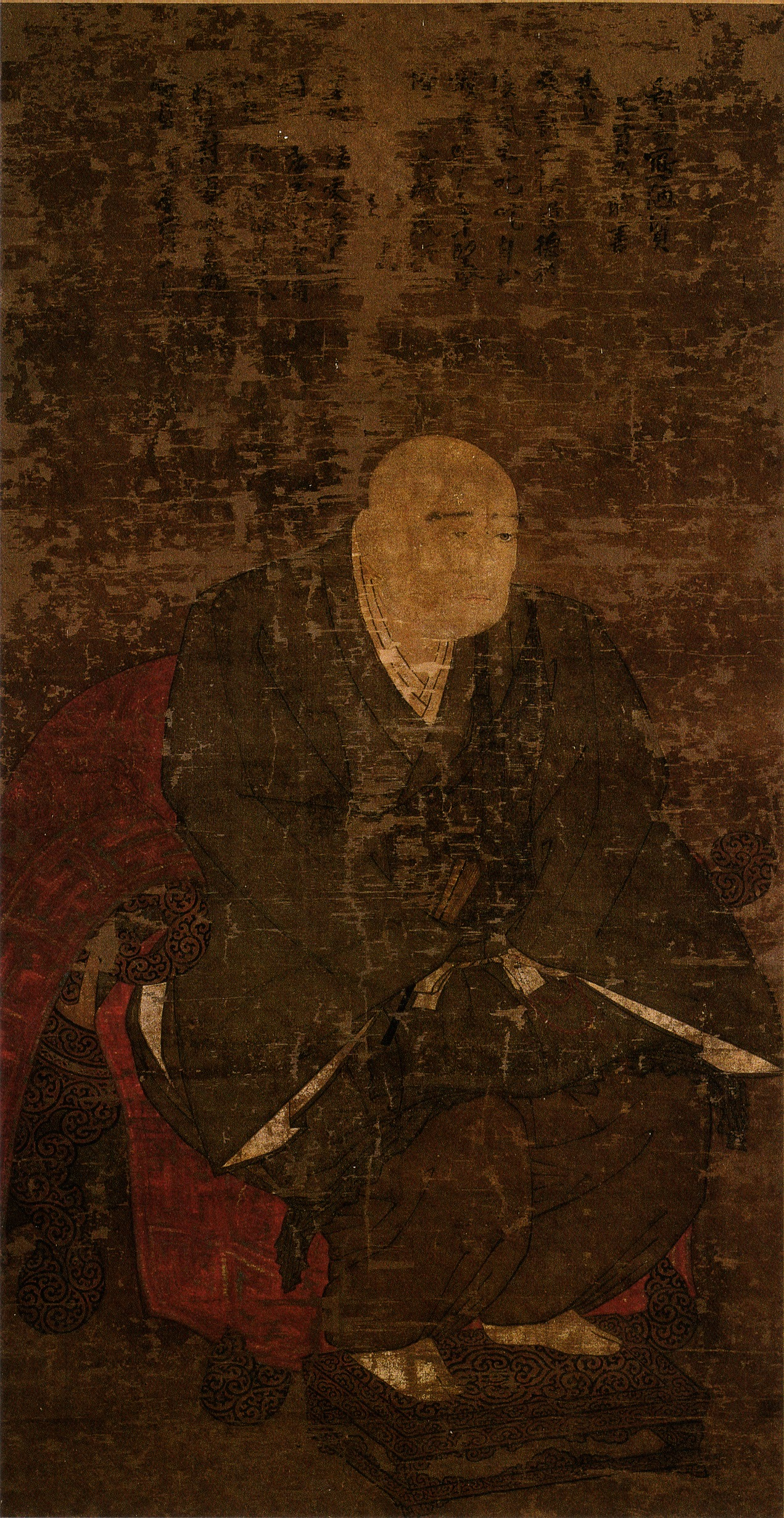

Sasaki Takauji (佐々木 高氏; 1306 – September 12, 1373), also known by his religious name Sasaki Dōyo, was a Japanese poet, warrior, and bureaucrat of the Muromachi period.

== Life ==
Born in Ōmi Province, Sasaki Takauji served the regent Hōjō Takatoki briefly, before aiding the shōgun Ashikaga Takauji in overthrowing the Kenmu Restoration (in which the Emperor Go-Daigo sought to regain real power) and establishing the Ashikaga shogunate.

=== Military service ===
During his period of service to the shogunate, Sasaki Takauji served as shugo (military governor) of six provinces, and held a number of other important positions.

=== Poetry ===
Takauji was also known for his waka and renga poetry, and contributed 81 of his poems to the first imperial anthology of renga, the Tsukubashū.

== Portrayal in media ==
Takauji is portrayed in the epic Taiheiki as a paragon of elegance and luxury, and as the quintessential military aristocrat. He exemplifies the extreme of extravagant taste known as "basara" where "the love of the extraordinary and accumulation of objects was paramount", and hosted events such as the twenty-day-long flower viewing event at Oharano.

== Family ==
- Foster Father: Sasaki Sadamune (1287-1305)
- Father: Sasaki Muneuji
- Mother: Sasaki Munetsuna’s daughter
- Wife: Nikaido Tokitsuna’s daughter
- Children:
  - Sasaki Hidetsuna (d.1353)
  - Sasaki Hidemune by Nikaido Tokitsuna’s daughter
  - Sasaki Takahide (1328-1391) by Nikaido Tokitsuna’s daughter
  - daughter married Akamatsu Norisuke
  - daughter married Shiba ujiyori
  - daughter married Rokkaku Ujiyori
