= Danrin school =

Japanese school of haikai poetry

The Danrin school (談林派) is a school of haikai poetry founded by the poet Nishiyama Sōin (1605 to 1682). The name literally means 'talkative forest' – in other words a ‘Literary Forest’.

== Origins ==
The school arose in reaction against the serious "bookishness" and concern for traditional culture popular in Japanese poetry at the time, under the influence of Matsunaga Teitoku and the Teimon school. In place of their formalism and didacticism, the new school looked to humour and low comedy for fresh inspiration, as well as to becoming more in touch with the common people, and therefore infusing a greater spirit of freedom into their poetry.

== Themes and language ==
The Danrin school favored plain language, everyday subjects, and the use of humor, often mocking or debunking the elegance of court waka. Its members explored people's daily life for sources of playfulness, but while opening up the world of haiku to fresh influences, they ran the risk of ending up with mere frivolity.

=== Bashō/Tosei ===
The renowned poet Matsuo Bashō had begun his poetic training in the Teimon school; but was much impressed by his meeting with Sōin, changing his pen name from Sōbō to Tosei, and becoming a member of the Danrin school. Though he later broke away from the latter, his mature style was to benefit from his ability to blend the seriousness of such earlier figures as Saigyō and Sōgi with the artistic freedom nurtured by the Danrin poets.

== See also ==
- Dada
- Haiga
- Uejima Onitsura
