= Renri Hishō =

Renri Hishō (連理秘抄 A Secret Treatise of Renga Principles) is a text on renga poetics. It was written by Nijō Yoshimoto around 1349. It had a great influence on the development of renga.

== Development ==
Yoshimoto learned waka from Ton'a and renga from Gusai and Kyūsei. While he authored several treatises on waka, it is for renga that he is best known. By the age of thirty, he was regarded as an authority on the subject.

In 1345, Yoshimoto composed Hekirenshō (僻連抄). This text served as the draft for Renri Hishō, and over the next four years he slightly revised and edited it until it became Renri Hishō. The differences between the two texts are extremely minimal.

The text currently remains in a single manuscript in the Inokuma Nobuo (猪熊信男) collection. It is a mid-Muromachi period copy.

== Contents ==
The text begins with a kanbun preface by Priest Gen'e and concludes with an afterword by Kyūsei. The main text consists of two major sections: general discourse on renga ranging from history to ways to learn, and rules for composing renga. These rules, more formally known as shikimoku (式目), became the foundation for later renga poetics such as the 1372 Ōan Shinshiki (応安新式).
