= Hori Bakusui =

Japanese writer

Hori Bakusui 堀麦水 (1718-1783) was a major Japanese poet of the Matsuo Bashō revival, writing traditional style haiku poems.

== Biography ==
Little is known of Bakusui's life apart from his poems. He came from Kanazawa in the middle Edo period, and studied under Otsuyu. He is considered romantic by temperament, and he attempted to revive the early style of the classical Haiku poet of the previous century, Matsuo Bashō, from the book Minashiguri. in 1770 he wrote a book of laconic comments on Bashō's hokku, called Jōkyō shōfū kukai densho (Orthodox style of the Jōkyō era: Verses with critical commentary).

== Haiku ==
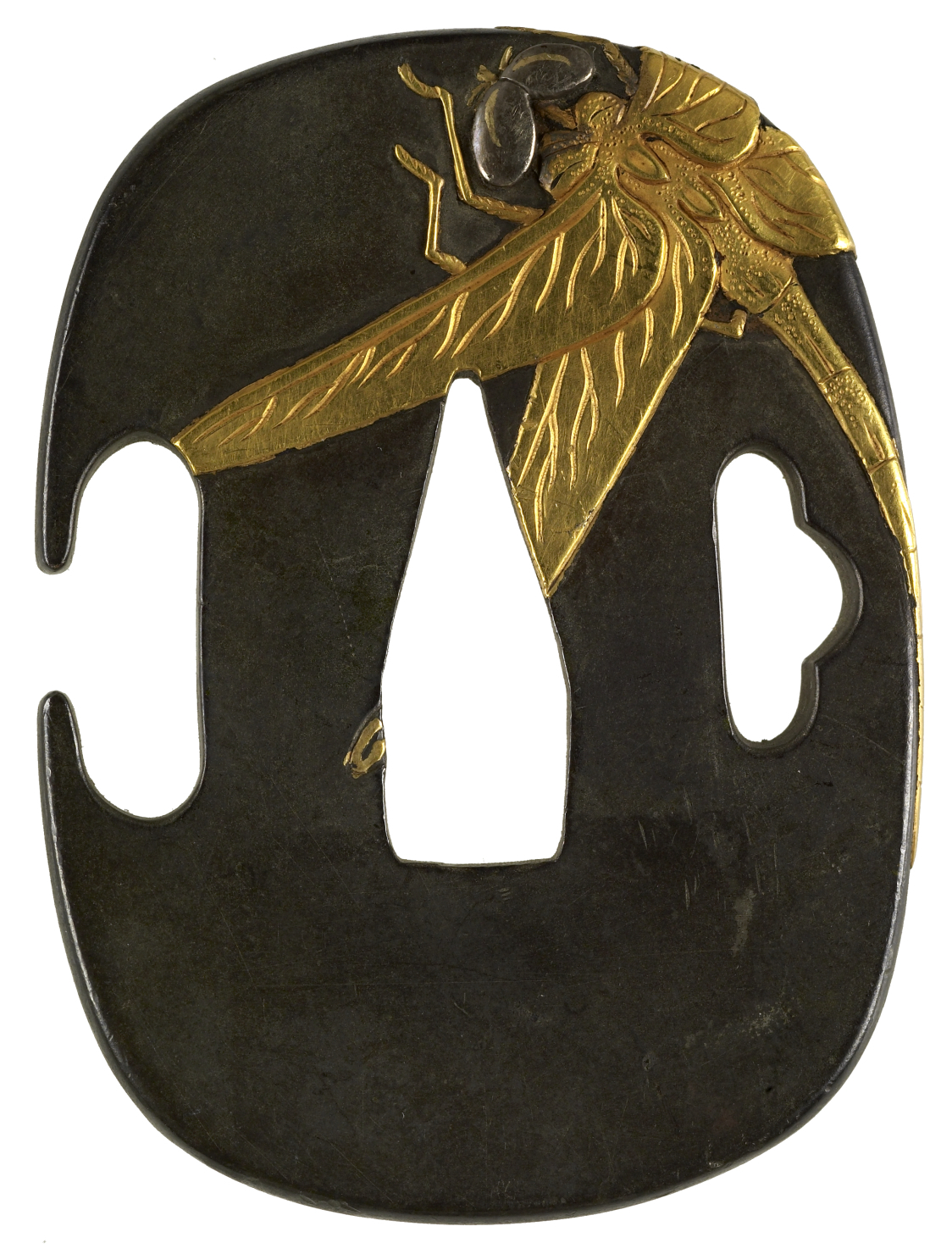
Japanese tsuba with a dragonfly, 1931: Shibuichi with gold and silver, Walters Art Museum

One of Bakusui's poems, on the popular haiku theme of the dragonfly, runs:

Dyeing his body
autumn—
the dragonfly.

— Bakusui

Another version on the same subject is

Dyed he is with the
Colour of autumnal days,
O red dragonfly.

== See also ==
- Haikai
