= Matsunaga Teitoku =

- 松永 貞徳
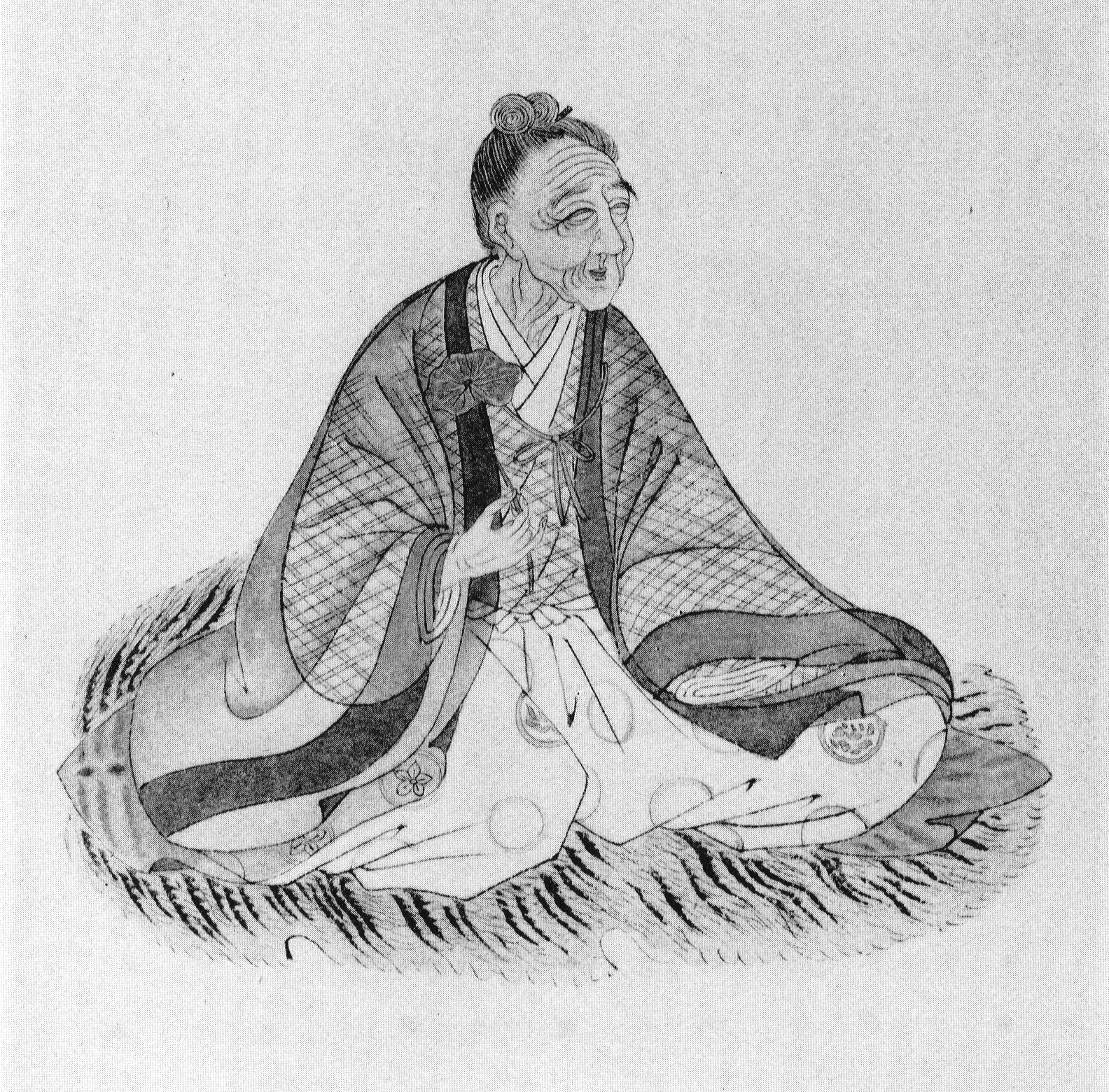
- Born: 1571
- Died: 1654 (aged 82–83)
- Other names: 長頭丸 (Tyōzumaru) 逍遊軒 (Syōyūken)
- Era: Edo period
- Children: Matsunaga Sekigo
- Father: Matsunaga Eisyu

Matsunaga Teitoku (Note: Japanese pronunciation: [ma.tsɯꜜ.na.ɡa | teꜜi.to.kɯ, -teꜜː-, ma.tsɯꜜ.na.ɡa (|) tei.to.kɯ, -teː-, -na.ŋa-]) (松永 貞徳; 1570–1653) was a Japanese haikai and waka poet. As a teacher of Teimon Haikai, he spread haikai throughout Japan. He was considered by R H Blyth to be the most important of Matsuo Bashō's predecessors.

== Achievements ==
Teitoku played a significant role in regularising the rules for Haikai, and in raising its importance and status as a genre. He specialised in elegant wordplay, and in subject-matter reflecting the Chinese classics and waka.

Through his disciples in the Teimon school, he influenced succeeding generations of haiku poets: thus for example Bashō's first haiku teacher, Kigin, came from his school.

== Criticism ==
Teitoku's approach was criticised by the Danrin school for shallowness and excessive wordplay. One member, Bashō himself, is reported to have said of its founder, Nishiyama Sōin, that, if not for him, "we would still be licking the slaver of aged Teitoku".

== See also ==
- Alexander Pope
