= Last Days of Issa's Father =

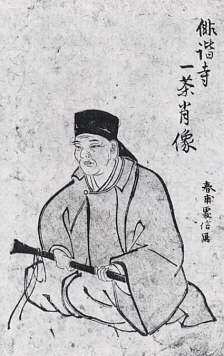
Portrait of Kobayashi Issa

The Chichi no Shuen Nikki (父の終焉日記, Chichi no Shūen Nikki) is an account by Kobayashi Issa of his father's final days and death. It has been acclaimed as one of the sources for the Japanese tradition of the "I novel".

== Synopsis ==
Kobayashi Issa (1763–1828), one of the four great haiku masters of Japan (along with Matsuo Bashō, Yosa Buson and Masaoka Shiki), describes the last days of his father in this account, which begins when his father suddenly developed fever and became seriously ill, and continues until a week after his death. Issa vividly describes both the gradual weakening of his father, who was then 68, and his own conflicts with his stepmother and his halfbrother. Since he wrote the text for publication, it has some literary embellishments and omissions.

== Kobayashi Issa ==
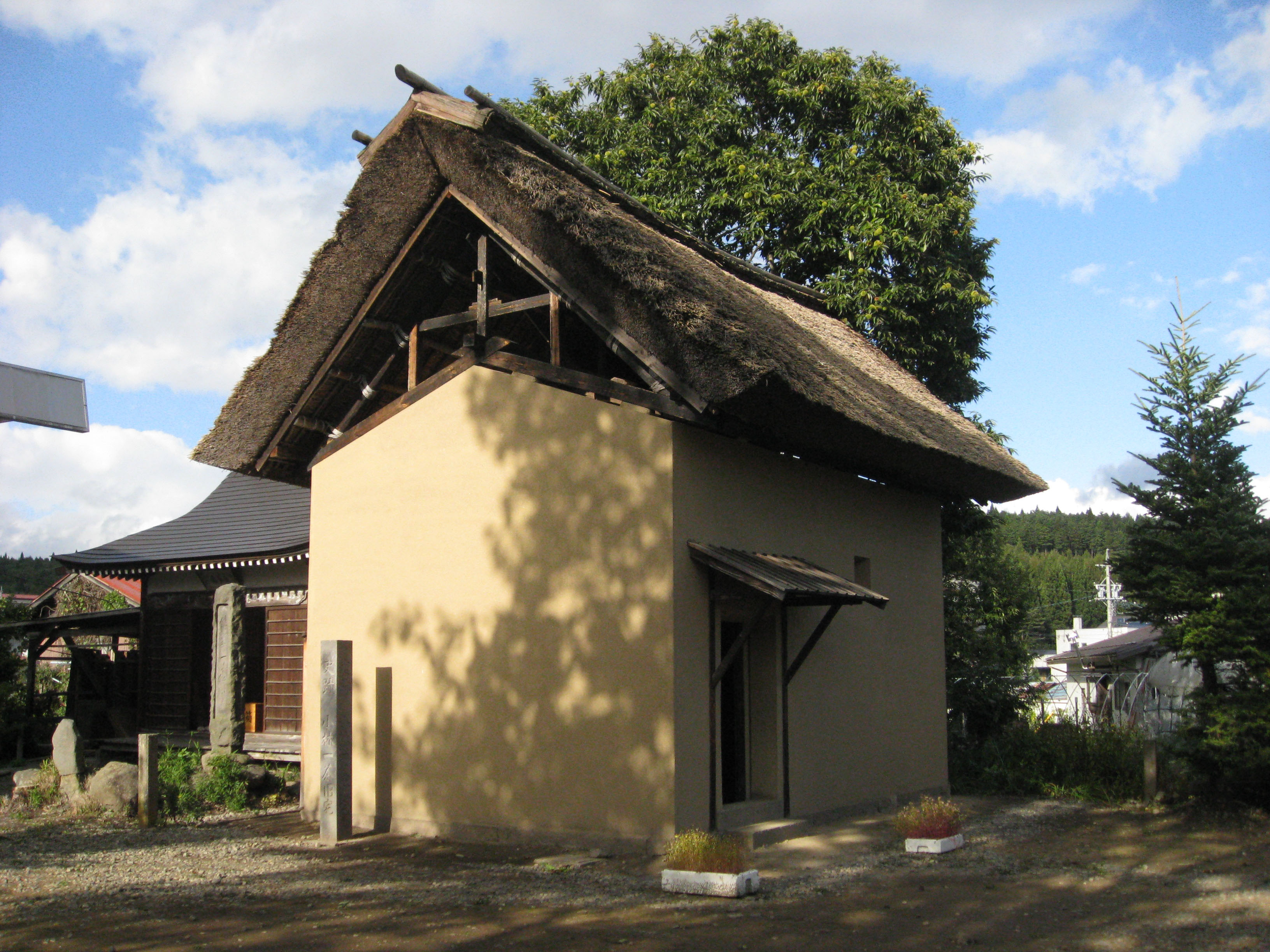
The storehouse Issa lived in

Kobayashi Issa was the first-born son of a farmer in Kashiwabara, Province of Shinano (now part of Shinano-machi, Nagano Prefecture). Issa's mother died when he was three and he was cared for by his doting grandmother, but his life changed dramatically when his father remarried five years later. Issa's relations with his stepmother were not good, and they worsened when a halfbrother was born two years later. He was 14 when his grandmother died, and a year later his father sent him off to Edo (now Tokyo) to eke out a living for himself. He wandered throughout Japan, but visited his hometown in 1791 and again in 1801. Shortly after his arrival in 1801, his father suddenly fell ill.

== About the text ==
The text was written on the back of sheets of Saitancho, New Year's memorandum paper. It was passed down by generations of the descendants of Kubota Shunko, one of Issa's disciples. It was well bound with a title page by Ogihara Seisensui and preserved at Issa-kan, a museum related to Issa in Takayama-mura, Nagano Prefecture.

== Evaluation ==
Ogihara Seisensui wrote that the text expresses strong emotions in every word and phrase. Everyday happenings — what Issa felt, what his father said - become very interesting and reveal Issa's personality.
