= Tsukubashū =

First imperial anthology of renga

Tsukubashū (菟玖波集; "The Tsukuba Anthology", compiled c. 1356) was the first imperial anthology of renga. The collection was compiled by Nijō Yoshimoto. Provincial lord Sasaki Takauji played an active role in its production with 81 of his poems appearing in the final version. In addition to courtly renga, the anthology contains, in Book 19, the earliest known collection of haikai no renga.

== Title ==
The title of the work refers to Tsukuba, a location in the east Japan at which, according to the Kojiki, Yamato Takeru and an elderly interlocutor composed a two-part poem together, this story being where practitioners of renga traced their tradition's origins.
