= Sōgi =

Japanese poet

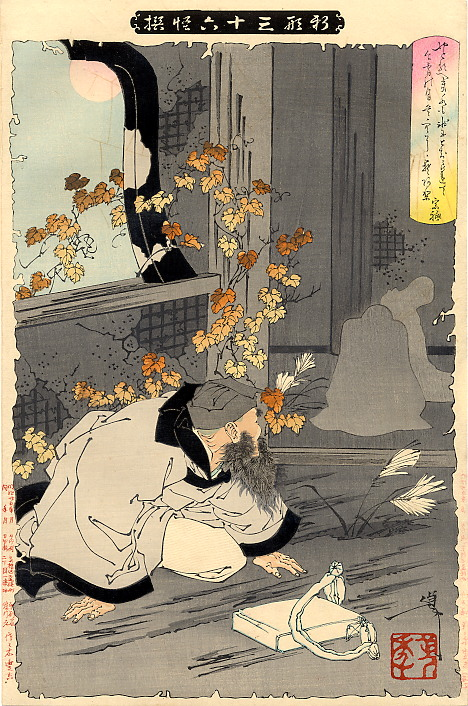
A print (by Tsukioka Yoshitoshi) depicts Sōgi writing a couplet for a ghost.

Iio Sōgi, (or Inō Sōgi) generally known as Sōgi (宗祇; 1421–1502), was a Japanese poet. He came from a humble family from the province of Kii or Ōmi, and died in Hakone on September 1, 1502. Sōgi was a Zen monk from the Shōkoku-ji temple in Kyoto and he studied poetry, both waka and renga. In his 30s, he became a professional renga poet.

During his travels to almost every corner of Japan, he was welcomed by the most powerful political, military and literary figures of his day. He attracted more disciples than any other poet of his generation. After traveling throughout Japan, he returned to Kyoto, where he commanded great respect.

He is best-remembered for his renga, wherein two or more poets collaborate to create a poem, by writing alternate stanzas. In Sōgi's day, such renga were typically 100 verses in length. Arising from the court tradition of waka, renga was cultivated by the warrior class as well as by courtiers, and some of the best renga poets, such as Sōgi, were commoners.

Sōgi is considered the greatest master of renga, his two most famous works being "Three Poets at Minase" (Minase sangin hyakuin, 1488) and "Three Poets at Yuyama" (Yuyama sangin hyakuin, 1491). This outstanding poet left more than 90 works (anthologies, diaries, poetic criticisms and manuals, among others). Before his death, he wrote "Sōgi Alone", which mostly includes his memoirs.
