= Haikai =

Japanese verse genre

Haikai (Japanese 俳諧 comic, unorthodox) may refer in both Japanese and English to haikai no renga (renku), a popular genre of Japanese linked verse, which developed in the sixteenth century out of the earlier aristocratic renga. It meant "vulgar" or "earthy", and often derived its effect from satire and puns, though "under the influence of [Matsuo] Bashō (1644–1694) the tone of haikai no renga became more serious". "Haikai" may also refer to other poetic forms that embrace the haikai aesthetic, including haiku and senryū (varieties of one-verse haikai), haiga (haikai art, often accompanied by haiku), and haibun (haiku mixed with prose, such as in the diaries and travel journals of haiku poets). However, haikai does not include orthodox renga or waka.

== Pre-Bashō Schools ==
=== Teimon School ===
The Teimon School, centred around Matsunaga Teitoku, did much to codify the rules of haikai, as well as to encourage the writing of stand-alone hokku.

=== Danrin School ===
The Danrin school reacted against the wordplay and mannerisms of the Teimon school, and expanded both the subject matter of haikai and its vocabulary, to describe ordinary life including vulgarisms: the use of what Bashō called "more homely images, such as a crow picking mud-snails in a rice paddy".

== Bashō ==
Matsuo Bashō is one of the most famous poets of the Edo period and the greatest figure active in Japanese haikai during the latter half of the seventeenth century. He made his life's work the transformation of haikai into a literary genre. For Bashō, haikai involved a combination of comic playfulness and spiritual depth, ascetic practice and involvement in human society. He composed haikai masterpieces in a variety of genres, including renku, haibun, and haiga. In contrast to the traditional Japanese poetry of his day, Bashō's haikai treated the ordinary, everyday lives of commoners, portraying figures from popular culture such as the beggar, the traveler and the farmer. In crystallizing the newly popular haikai, he played a significant role in giving birth to modern haiku, which reflected the common culture.

== Bashō Revival ==
A new group of poets emerged in the mid-1700s who "condemned the commercialized practices [of] contemporary haikai and argued for a return to the ideals of Matsuo Bashō". The 18th century reform movement, lasting from around the 1730s to the 1790s came to be called the Bashō Revival. Prominent poets of this movement included Yosa Buson (1716–1783), Miura Chora (1729–1780), Takai Kitō (1741–1789), and Wada Ranzan (d. 1773). "[O]ther major 'Back to Bashō' poets were Tan Taigi 炭太祇 (1709–1771), Katō Kyōtai 加藤暁台 (1732-1792), Chōmu 蝶夢 (1732–1795), Kaya Shirao 加舎白雄 (1738–1791), and Hori Bakusui (1718-1783). The movement had followers all over the country, due in part to the itinerant habits of many of its members." The revival movement members competed with the tentori poets, who neglected the craft of poetry in favor of dazzling readers with wit, "favor[ing] zoku (Japanese: 俗), the mundane or commonplace, over ga (Japanese: 雅), the elegant and refined".

== Yosa Buson and Masaoka Shiki ==
In the late Meiji period, the poet and literary critic Masaoka Shiki (1867–1902) first used the term haiku for the modern, standalone verses of haikai that Bashō had popularized. Until then, haiku had been called hokku, a term which refers to the first verse in a renga sequence. Shiki also rediscovered Yosa Buson, a prominent "Back to Bashō" poet and painter who died in 1784. Shiki considered Buson a painter in words and a visual poet, and Shiki's writings during the 19th century formed the foundation for the appraisal of Buson's work in most of the 20th century.

== See also ==
- Sept haï-kaïs
- Sept haïkaï
- Kobayashi Issa
