= Kobayashi Issa =

Japanese poet

Kobayashi Issa 小林 一茶
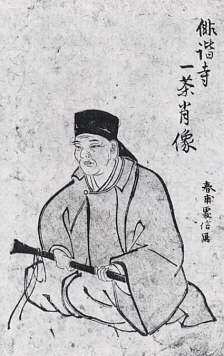
- Issa's portrait drawn by Muramatsu Shunpo 1772-1858 (Issa Memorial Hall, Shinano, Nagano, Japan)
- Born: Kobayashi Nobuyuki (小林 信之); June 15, 1763; Near Shinano-machi, Shinano Province, Japan
- Died: January 5, 1828 (aged 64); Shinano-machi, Shinano Province, Japan
- Occupation: Poet
- Writing career
- Pen name: Issa (一茶)

Kobayashi Issa (小林 一茶; June 15, 1763 – January 5, 1828) was a Japanese poet. He is known for his haiku poems and journals. He is better known as simply Issa (一茶), a pen name meaning Cup-of-tea (lit. "one [cup of] tea"). He is regarded as one of the four haiku masters in Japan, along with Bashō, Buson and Shiki — "the Great Four."

Reflecting the popularity and interest in Issa as man and poet, Japanese books on Issa outnumber those on Buson and almost equal in number those on Bashō.

== Biography ==
Issa was born and registered as Kobayashi Nobuyuki (小林 信之), with a childhood name of Kobayashi Yatarō (小林 弥太郎), the first son of a farmer family of Kashiwabara, now part of Shinano-machi, Shinano Province (present-day Nagano Prefecture). Issa endured the loss of his mother, who died when he was three. Her death was the first of numerous difficulties young Issa suffered.

He was cared for by his grandmother, who doted on him, but his life changed again when his father remarried five years later. Issa's half-brother was born two years later. When his grandmother died when he was 14, Issa felt estranged in his own house, a lonely, moody child who preferred to wander the fields. His attitude did not please his stepmother, who, according to Lewis Mackenzie, was a "tough-fibred 'managing' woman of hard-working peasant stock."

He was sent to Edo (present-day Tokyo) by his father one year later to make out a living. Nothing of the next ten years of his life is known for certain. His name was associated with Kobayashi Chikua (小林 竹阿) of the Nirokuan (二六庵) haiku school, but their relationship is not clear. During the following years, he wandered through Japan and fought over his inheritance with his stepmother (his father died in 1801). He wrote a diary, now called Last Days of Issa's Father.

After years of legal wrangles, Issa managed to secure rights to half of the property his father left. He returned to his native village at the age of 49 and soon took a wife, Kiku (菊). After a brief period of bliss, tragedy returned. The couple's first-born child died shortly after his birth. A daughter, Satoyo (里世), died less than two-and-a-half years later, inspiring Issa to write this haiku (translated by Lewis Mackenzie):

露の世は露の世ながらさりながら

Tsuyu no yo wa tsuyu no yo nagara sari nagara

This dewdrop world --
Is a dewdrop world,
And yet, and yet . . .

Issa married twice more late in his life, and through it all he produced a huge body of work. A third child died in 1820. Then Kiku fell ill and died in 1823, when Issa was 61. Issa's response was this haiku:

生き残り生き残りたる寒さかな

Ikinokori ikinokoritaru samusa kana

Outliving them,
Outliving them all,
Ah, the cold!

He died on January 5, 1828, in his native village. According to the old Japanese calendar, he died on the 19th day of Eleventh Month, Tenth Year of the Bunsei era. Since the Tenth Year of Bunsei roughly corresponds with 1827, many sources list this as his year of death.

== Writings and drawings ==
Issa wrote over 20,000 haiku, which have won him readers up to the present day. Though his works were popular, he suffered great monetary instability. His poetry makes liberal use of local dialects and conversational phrases, and 'including many verses on plants and the lower creatures. Issa wrote 54 haiku on the snail, 15 on the toad, nearly 200 on frogs, about 230 on the firefly, more than 150 on the mosquito, 90 on flies, over 100 on fleas and nearly 90 on the cicada, making a total of about one thousand verses on such creatures'. By contrast, Bashō's verses are comparatively few in number, about 2,000 in all. Issa's haiku were sometimes tender, but stand out most for their irreverence and wry humor, as illustrated in these verses translated by Robert Hass:

No doubt about it,
the mountain cuckoo
is a crybaby.

New Year's Day—
everything is in blossom!
I feel about average.

Issa, 'with his intense personality and vital language [and] shockingly impassioned verse...is usually considered a most conspicuous heretic to the orthodox Basho tradition'. Nevertheless, 'in that poetry and life were one in him...[&] poetry was a diary of his heart', it is at least arguable that 'Issa could more truly be said to be Basho's heir than most of the haikai poets of the nineteenth century'.

Issa's works include haibun (passages of prose with integrated haiku) such as Oraga Haru (おらが春 "My Spring") and Shichiban Nikki (七番日記 "Number Seven Journal"), and he collaborated on more than 250 renku (collaborative linked verse).

Issa was also known for his drawings, generally accompanying haiku: "the Buddhism of the haiku contrasts with the Zen of the sketch". His approach has been described as "similar to that of Sengai....Issa's sketches are valued for the extremity of their abbreviation, in keeping with the idea of haiku as a simplification of certain types of experience."

One of Issa's haiku, as translated by R.H. Blyth, appears in J. D. Salinger's 1961 novel Franny and Zooey:

O snail
Climb Mount Fuji,
But slowly, slowly!

(Katatsumuri sorosoro nobore Fuji no yama 蝸牛そろそろ登れ富士の山) The same poem, in Russian translation, served as an epigraph for a novel Snail on the Slope by Arkady and Boris Strugatsky (published 1966–68), also providing the novel's title.

Another, translated by D.T. Suzuki, was written during a period of Issa's life when he was penniless and deep in debt. It reads:

ともかくもあなたまかせの年の暮
tomokaku mo anata makase no toshi no kure

Trusting the Buddha, good and bad,
I bid farewell
To the departing year.

Another, translated by Peter Beilenson with Harry Behn, reads:

Everything I touch
with tenderness, alas,
pricks like a bramble.

Issa's most popular and commonly known tome, titled The Spring of My Life, is autobiographical, and its structure combines prose and haiku.

== Kobayashi Issa former residence ==
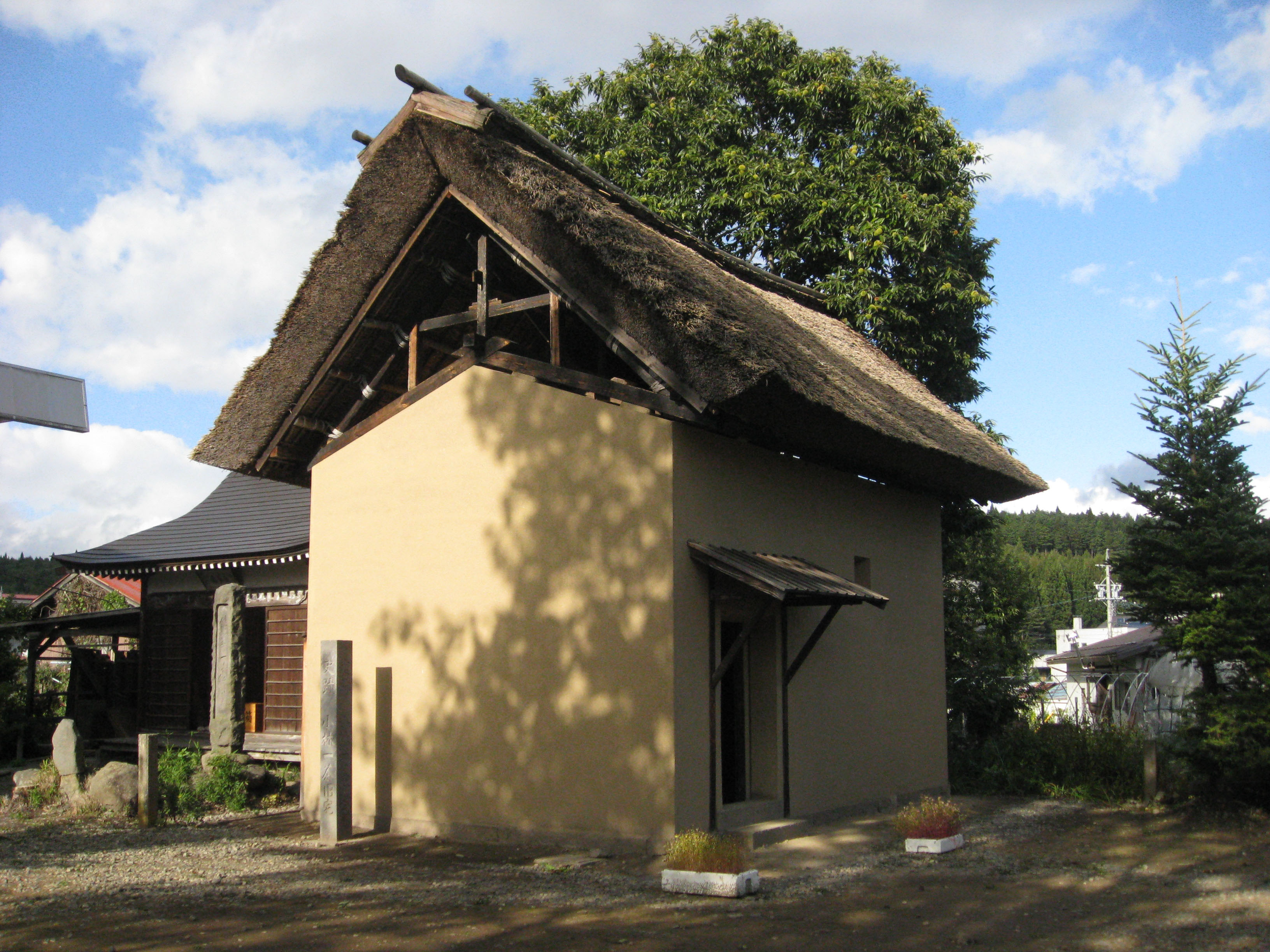
Issa lived in this storehouse in his last days (Shinano, Nagano, Japan)

After a big fire swept through the post station of Kashiwabara on July 24, 1827, Issa lost his house and was forced to live in his kura (storehouse). "The fleas have fled from the burning house and have taken refuge with me here", says Issa. Of this same fire, he wrote:

Hotarubi mo amaseba iya haya kore wa haya (蛍火もあませばいやはやこれははや)

If you leave so much
As a firefly's glimmer,—
Good Lord! Good Heavens!'

This building, a windowless clay-walled structure, has survived, and was designated a National Historic Site of Japan in 1933.

== English translations ==
- Kobayashi, Issa (2015). Killing A Fly. Saarbrücken: Calambac Publishing House. ISBN 978-3-943117-87-5.
- Hamill, Sam, trans. (1997). The Spring of My Life and Selected Haiku: Kobayashi Issa. Shambhala Publications. ISBN 1-57062-144-6. (pbk, 180 pp., 160 haiku plus The Spring of My Life, an autobiographical haibun)
- Hass, Robert (1995). The Essential Haiku: Versions of Basho, Buson, & Issa. United States: Ecco Press. ISBN 0880013516.
- Mackenzie, Lewis (1984). Autumn Wind Haiku. Japan: Kodansha International. ISBN 0-87011-657-6.
- Sasaki, Nanao, trans. (1999). Inch by Inch: 45 Haiku by Issa. Albuquerque: La Alameda Press. ISBN 1-888809-13-2. (pbk, 96 pp., 45 haiku plus "Cup of Tea, Plate of Fish: An Interview with Nanao Sakaki")
