= Renku =

Japanese poetic form

Renku (連句, "linked verses"), or haikai no renga (俳諧の連歌; "comic linked verse"), is a Japanese form of popular collaborative linked verse poetry. It is a development of the older Japanese poetic tradition of ushin renga, or orthodox collaborative linked verse. At renku gatherings participating poets take turns providing alternating verses of 17 and 14 morae. Initially haikai no renga distinguished itself through vulgarity and coarseness of wit, before growing into a legitimate artistic tradition, and eventually giving birth to the haiku form of Japanese poetry. The term renku gained currency after 1904, when Kyoshi Takahama started to use it.

== Development ==
The oldest known collection of haikai linked verse appears in the first imperial anthology of renga, the Tsukubashū (1356–57).

Traditional renga was a group activity in which each participant displayed his wit by spontaneously composing a verse in response to the verse that came before; the more interesting the relationship between the two verses the more impressive the poet’s ability. The links between verses could range from vulgar to artistic, but as renga was taken up by skilled poets and developed into a set form, the vulgarity of its early days came to be ignored.

Haikai no renga, in response to the stale set forms that preceded it, embraced this vulgar attitude and was typified by contempt for traditional poetic and cultural ideas, and by the rough, uncultured language that it used. The haikai spirit, as it came to be called, embraced the natural humor that came from the combination of disparate elements. To that end haikai poets would often combine elements of traditional poems with new ones they created. A well-known example of this early attitude is the opening couplet, possibly by Yamazaki Sōkan (1464–1552), from his Inutsukubashū (犬筑波集, "Mongrel Renga Collection").

He was given the following prompt:

霞の衣裾は塗れけり kasumi no koromo suso wa nurekeri

The robe of haze is wet at its hem

to which he responded:

佐保姫の春立ちながら尿をして sahohime no haru tachi nagara shito o shite

Princess Saho of spring pissed while standing

This poem clearly derives its humor from shock value. Never before in recorded Japanese culture had anyone dared to talk of the goddess of spring in such a manner. Taking an ostensibly traditional and poetic prompt and injecting vulgar humor while maintaining the connection of the damp hems and the spring mists was exactly the sort of thing that early haikai poets were known for.

A comparable, though less evolved, tradition of 'linked verse' (lián jù, written with the same characters as 'renku') evolved in Qin dynasty China, and it has been argued that this Chinese form influenced Japanese renga during its formative period.

== Formats used in renku ==
Below is a list of the formats most commonly used in writing renku

Name of format	Number of stanzas	Number of kaishi (writing sheets)	Number of sides	Originator	Date of origin
Kasen (poetic geniuses)	36	2	4	unknown	1423
Han-kasen (half-kasen)	18	1	2	unknown	17th century

== See also ==
- Collaborative poetry
- Haikai – the genre which encompasses renku and related forms such as haiku, senryū, haiga and haibun
- Kigo – a season word or phrase used in many renku verses
- List of Japanese poetry anthologies
- Matsuo Bashō – the 17th-century Japanese poet who brought renku to a pinnacle of artistic achievement
- Renga – the earlier collaborative poetry from which renku evolved
- Renshi, modern development of renga and renku
- Sarumino – magnum opus of Bashō-school poetry, containing four kasen renku
- Winter Days – a 2003 animated film, based on one of the renku in the collection of the same name by the 17th-century Japanese poet Bashō
