= Renga =

Genre of Japanese poetry

Renga (連歌, linked poem) is a genre of Japanese collaborative poetry in which alternating stanzas, or ku (句), of 5-7-5 and 7-7 morae (sound units or syllables per line) are linked in succession by multiple poets. Known as tsukuba no michi (筑波の道 The Way of Tsukuba) after the famous Tsukuba Mountain in the Kantō region, the form of poetry is said to have originated in a two-verse poetry exchange by Yamato Takeru and later gave birth to the genres haikai (俳諧) and haiku (俳句).

The genre was elevated to a literary art by Nijō Yoshimoto (二条良基, 1320–1388), who compiled the first imperial renga anthology Tsukubashū (菟玖波集) in 1356. The most famous renga master was Sōgi (宗祇, 1421–1502), and Matsuo Bashō (松尾芭蕉, 1644–1694) after him became the most famous haikai master. Renga sequences were typically composed live during gatherings of poets, transcribed oral sessions known as rengakai (連歌会), but could also be composed by single poets as mainly textual works.

== History ==
=== Classical and early medieval ===
The "origin" of renga is traditionally associated with a passage in the Kojiki, wherein Prince Yamato Takeru speaks to an old man and inquires, by way of a katauta poem, how many nights he had slept since passing Nabari and Tsukuba, to which the old man responds by way of another kata-uta poem, which combined form a single sedōka. Later medieval renga poets, out of reverence for this exchange, would refer to their art as "the Way of Tsukuba", and the first imperial renga anthology, the Tsukubashū, alludes to it in the title.

The earliest extant renga appears in the Manyoshu (万葉集), with its 5-7-5 mora jōku (上句 first stanza) written by Ōtomo no Yakamochi (大伴家持, 718-785) and its 7-7 mora geku (下句 last stanza) written by a Buddhist nun (尼 ama) in an exchange of poems. This two-stanza form is now called tanrenga (短連歌) to differentiate it from chōrenga (長連歌), the hyakuin renga (百韻連歌 100-stanza renga) to which the general term renga refers.

The tanrenga form was popular from the beginning of the Heian Period until the end of cloistered rule (院政 insei) and would sometimes appear in imperial anthologies of waka, which it closely resembled at a glance. It was during the insei period that the form began to take shape and evolve into chōrenga. The Kin'yōshū (金葉集) was the first imperial waka anthology to include an explicit section on renga thanks to its compiler Minamoto no Toshiyori (源俊頼, also Minamoto no Shunrai; ~1055–1129), who was the first to write about renga theory in his poetic treatise Toshiyori Zuinō (俊頼髄脳).

As tanrenga gained traction and began to feature more intricate and technically complex links between its two stanzas, the genre gained popularity as a game, and events were held to create the best links. Participants began going beyond the original two stanzas of tanrenga, leading to the creation of a chōrenga form more formal than games like iroha renga, in which 47 stanzas beginning with each of the 47 characters of the hiragana writing system were linked. Around the same time, a more straightforward style of linking developed, which also helped to spur the lengthening of the form. Eventually, this 100-stanza renga, which alternated 5-7-5 and 7-7 mora verses (known as tanku 短句 and chōku 長句 respectively), became the basis for what we know as renga today.

The vocabulary of hyakuin renga was largely limited to the standard poetic diction (歌言葉, utakotoba) that had been established in the Kokinshū. At this time, poets considered the use of utakotoba as the essence of creating a perfect waka, and use of any other words was considered to be unbecoming of true poetry.

A comparable, though less evolved, tradition of 'linked verse' (lián jù 連句—the same characters as 'renku')—evolved in Qin dynasty China, and this Chinese form may have influenced Japanese renga during its formative period. However, there are major differences between the two, the Chinese having a unity of subject and a general lightheartedness of tone, neither of which characteristic is present in Japanese renga; furthermore, the history of Japanese poetry shows renga as an apparently natural evolution.

Around the time of the Shin Kokin Wakashū (新古今和歌集, 1205) during the rule of Emperor Go-Tōba, hyakuin renga developed enough to gain its first real independence from waka. In the courts, ushin mushin renga (有心無心連歌) sessions were held in which poets and non-poets were divided into ushin and mushin respectively to link stanzas. The ushin side would offer orthodox elegant stanzas while the mushin side would offer comical or aesthetically "wilder" stanzas (狂歌 kyōka), and while submissions from both sides were accepted as appropriate links, the ushin were favored. While this practice ended with the Jōkyū Disturbance (1221), it served as an important foundation for the further development of hyakuin renga, which placed more emphasis on the skill of poets, and stanzas by many major renga participants of the Go-Tōba court such as Fujiwara no Teika (1162–1241) were later anthologized in the Tsukubashū.

After the Jōkyū Disturbance, renga moved out of the courts. In the popular hana no moto renga (花の下連歌 "renga under flowers"), commoners would gather for renga sessions under the flowering trees in spring, a tradition that is estimated to have been around for about 100 years by the start of the Nanboku-chō Period. Some of the later resulting works were anthologized in the Tsukubashū. Jige renga (地下連歌 "underground renga") was born out of hana no moto renga and was pervasive through the Mongol invasions of Japan (1274–1281) and after. The jige renga poets were led by Priest Zen’a (善阿法師, ??–1312), who built upon the rules of hana no moto renga but also deviated from them, creating new versions of forms such as 1-day 1000-stanza renga (一日千句連歌 ichi nichi senku renga)—telling of the genre's wide scale. Renga continued to flourish in the courts as well, and the era saw splendid renga gatherings of even 10,000 verses a day, as well as prominent women poets such as the Buddhist nun Nijō (二条尼 nijō no ama).

It was during the Kamakura Period that the rules (式目 shikimoku) of renga began to develop. At the time, one of the most important rules was fushimono (賦物), titular prompts that had to be followed by every stanza in the entire sequence. For instance, a white-black fushimono would call for each verse to alternate between including a white object and a black object. Others fushimono might be more linguistic, such as requiring odd verses to include three-mora phrases that became a different word upon removal of the middle mora, and even verses to include four-mora phrases that became a different word upon removal of the first and last mora.

=== Late medieval ===
In the Nanboku-cho Period, renga began to take form and establish itself as a literary genre, largely owing to the efforts of Nijō Yoshimoto (二条良基, 1320–1388), who compiled the first imperial renga anthology Tsukubashū (菟玖波集) in 1356. As reflected in the collection, aesthetic and linguistically polished hyakuin renga that embodied the spirit of the renga session became the foundation for the genre as it is known today.

Yoshimoto was a disciple of Gusai (救済, also Kyūsei or Kyūzei; 1281–1376), who was taught by Zen’a. Gusai, a commoner priest, was a leading jige renga poet and key collaborator in the compilation of the Tsukubashū. Yoshimoto was an aristocrat who served in the Northern Court of the Ashikaga Shogunate. He was originally a waka poet, and his relationship with Gusai, who also had training in courtly literature, brought together common and courtly renga traditions. Yoshimoto was the first to write extensively on renga theory, creating many works laying out the genre’s structure, aesthetic standards, shikimoku, and more. One major change he made was to the fushimono, which remained part of the title but now only applied to the first verse rather than the whole sequence. Other important rules delineated the maximum numbers of stanzas in which certain topics could appear in a row, and maximum numbers of stanzas in which certain topics could appear across the whole sequence. Many of his aesthetic treatises became important pedagogical artifacts for future renga poets. Through his theoretical work and compilation of the Tsukubashū, Yoshimoto elevated renga to the status of an independent literary genre, setting a crucial foundation for its golden age.

The golden age of renga is widely regarded as the Muromachi Period, during which many of the greatest renga masters were active. The era is epitomized by the poet Sōgi (宗祇, 1421–1502) and his compilation of the renga anthology Shintsukubashū (新菟玖波集, lit. "New Tsukubashū).

Prior to Sōgi, Ichijō Kaneyoshi (一条兼良, also Kanera; 1402–1481) aimed to succeed his grandfather Nijō Yoshimoto with his compilation of the Aratamashū (新玉集), which he worked on with the priest Sōzei (宗砌). However, the anthology was lost and the creation of the next major anthology was completed instead by Sozei’s disciple, Sōgi. Sōzei was one of the "seven sages," a group of poets all active around that time. They consisted of Priest Chiun (智蘊法師, 1448–1471), Priest Sōzei (宗砌法師, ??–1455), High Priest Gyōjo (法印行助, 1405–1469), Priest Nōa (能阿法師, 1397–1471), Clergyman Shinkei (権大僧都心敬; 1406–1475), High Priest Senjun (法眼専順 1411–1476), and Priest Sōi (宗伊法師, 1418–1485). Their work was later anthologized by Sōgi in his anthology Chikurinshō (竹林抄), for which Kaneyoshi wrote the preface.

Sōgi, a commoner priest, studied literature extensively, learning renga from Sōzei and classical literature from Kaneyoshi among others. He spent much time travelling the country as a professional renga poet despite the tumultuous political context of his era. His works often feature the relationship between humans and nature. His anthology Shintsukubashū became the successor to the Tsukubashū, and he also composed many other major works, the two most famous being "Three Poets at Minase" (水無瀬三吟百韻 Minase Sangin Hyakuin) and "Three Poets at Yuyama" (湯山三吟百韻 Yuyama Sangin Hyakuin). Both sequences were composed by Sōgi and two of his disciples, the priests Shōhaku (肖柏, 1143–1527) and Sōchō (宗長, 1448–1532), in 1488 and 1491 respectively. The former was created as an offering for Emperor Go-Toba, the compiler of the Shinkokinshū, making it a formal piece with ceremonial grandeur. "Three Poets at Yuyama," on the other hand, was created in a more relaxed setting and enjoyed greater popularity in its time. It did, however, maintain also many conventions of renga despite its greater flexibility. The two are now considered the most canonical renga sequences and were widely used pedagogically as standards for the genre.

Sōgi’s death in 1502 was followed by a peak in popularity and then decline of renga as the new genre haikai developed. Sōgi’s lineage of disciples continued the renga tradition that ended with the death of Jōha (紹巴, 1524–1602), who is considered to be the final major renga poet.

One of Sōgi’s final disciples and also a previous disciple of Sōchō, the priest Sōseki (宗碩, 1474–1533), continued the Sōgi line of disciples after the poet’s death. Sōhoku (宗牧, ??–1545) was a disciple of Sōchō and Sōseki, and after their deaths rose to the forefront of the renga world. Like his predecessors, he spent much of his time travelling and wrote many works on renga theory in addition to his compositions. His son Sōyō (宗養, 1526–1563) was raised renga poet as well and continued the tradition of travel. He became the top renga master after the death of all of the previous generation. His own death marked the end of the Sōgi tradition of renga, and his contemporary Satomura Jōha rose by default to the top position in the renga world.

Jōha came from another branch of the Sōgi lineage; he studied under Sōseki’s disciple Shūkei (周桂, 1470–1544), and then Shūkei’s disciple Satomura Shōkyū (里村昌休, 1511–1552) after Shūkei’s death, taking Satomura as his family name. Jōha was heavily involved with major political figures of his time, establishing connections with important people from various factions. His renga moved toward easy understandability and away from the depth and aesthetic standards of the previous tradition. After his death, renga’s period of widespread popularity ended as it was overtaken by haikai, its child genre. Matsuo Bashō (1644–1694) became the most prominent haikai poet and was later also famous for his haiku.

Renga was a popular form of poetry even in the confusion of Azuchi–Momoyama period. Yet by the end of this era, the shikimoku had become so complicated and systematic that they stifled the active imagination that had been a part of the renga's appeal. During the medieval and Edo periods, renga was a part of the cultural knowledge required for high society.

=== Edo–Meiji ===
In the Edo period, as more and more ordinary citizens became familiar with renga, shikimoku were greatly simplified. The 36-verse Kasen became the most popular form of renga, and commonly spoken words as well as slang and Chinese words were allowed. With this relaxation of the rules, renga were able to express broader humor and wit. This style of renga came to be called haikai no renga ("comical linked verse") or simply haikai, and Matsuo Bashō is known as the greatest haikai poet.

The most favored form of renga in the Edo period was the kasen (歌仙), a chain consisting of 36 verses. As a rule, kasen must refer to flowers (usually cherry blossoms) twice, and three times to the moon. These references are termed hana no za (花の座; "the seat of flowers") and tsuki no za (月の座; "the seat of the moon").

The first stanza of the renga chain, the hokku, is the forebear of the modern haiku. The stand-alone hokku was renamed haiku in the Meiji period by the great Japanese poet and critic Masaoka Shiki. Shiki proposed haiku as an abbreviation of the phrase "haikai no ku" meaning a verse of haikai.

For almost 700 years, renga was a popular form of poetry, but its popularity was greatly diminished in the Meiji period. Masaoka Shiki, although himself a participant in several renga, claimed that "(Renga is) not literature" (「文学に非ず」, Bungaku ni arazu). The renga's appeal of working as a group to make a complete work was not compatible with the European style of poetry gaining popularity in Japan, where a single poet writes the entire poem.

== Structure of and conventions of Hyakuin renga ==
The hyakuin renga sequence begins with the hokku (発句), a 5-7-5 mora verse which was the origin of the late haiku genre. Unlike the following verses, the hokku in a renga session was expected to reflect the reality of the ba—its geographical location, season, etc.—and was also the only verse expected to be able to stand independently as a poem. The composition of the hokku was usually left to a skilled poet, and professional renga poets would sometimes be commissioned to write them during their travels. Often, the hokku would be written by the guest of the session, with the host responding with the second verse. Two technical conventions that carried over to haiku were the seasonal word kigo (季語) and a "cutting word" kireji (切字). The hokku was followed by the wakiku (脇句), daisan (第三), the names for the second and third verses respectively. Including these two, the rest of the linked verses were called tsukeku (付句), and verses 4-99 together were called the hiraku (平句). The final verse was called the ageku (挙句).

During a renga session, the verses were transcribed onto a paper known as kaishi (懐紙), using four sheets, or eight sides of paper, total. The first side (初折 sho-ori) and last side (名残折 nagori-no-ori) contained 8 verses each, and the rest of the sides contained 14 verses each. There were various structural rules based on the paper layout, the most important being the "four blossoms eight moons" rule (四花八月). Each sheet should include one verse that used the word hana (花), or blossoms, and each side should include one verse that used the word tsuki (月) to mean moon specifically (as opposed to "month"). Sometimes the "moon" on the last page would be omitted, leaving seven "moons," making that half of rule more flexible than the number of "blossom" verses, which were considered more important and were usually composed by senior poets or those of higher social status.

In addition to the "four blossoms eight moons" rule, which served as a major structural pillar for the sequence, there were many other rules regarding topics or lexical categories and their usage in the context of the whole verse. As the vocabulary of renga largely followed the lexicon of waka, which used a limited number of words, there was a complex but clear system of what words fell under what category. For instance, ikkumono (一句物) was a category of specific phrases could only be used once in the entire sequence due to their particularly strong impression, or because they were considered unrefined. Some of the most important topics were the four seasons, love, reminiscence (述懐 jukkai; included topics like grief and nostalgia), travel, and Buddhism. Topics like these had to follow the rules of rinne (輪廻 recurrence), which dictated the maximum and/or minimum number of verses each topic could appear in a row. For instance, spring and autumn verses must repeat for at least three and at most five verses in a row. Love originally followed the same rule, but by Sōgi’s era the minimum had dropped to two, and a single verse was allowed by the Edo Period. Summer, winter, travel, and Buddhism, among many others, could repeat for a maximum of three verses and no minimum, as could reminiscence—here, the subtopic of transiency fell under reminiscence, although it did not for other rules.

There were also many conventions governing the flow of movement throughout the sequence. The term for the proper flow of rhythm, which was also used in other art forms such as Noh theatre, was jōhakyū (序破急), or "prelude, development, presto" in the manner of music. The jō contained the first ten verses, which should be graceful, smooth, and subtle. The ha encompassed the 11th to 78th verses, which should be dynamic and exciting. The last 22 verses were the kyū, which should move quickly and easily, particularly the final 8 verses for a clean-cut finish. Another convention regarding the flow of the sequence was the alternation of mon (紋 "pattern") and ji (地 "background") verses. Mon verses contained more striking imagery that drew the audience’s attention, while ji verses were relatively plainer and inconspicuous verses serving to bring out the vividness of the mon. A good flow required skilled but subtle control of the pattern of the two types of verses.

Because in renga each verse is only related to its immediate neighbors, the sequence as a whole does not have very much semantic, stylistic, or thematic unity. Thus, what held the sequence together was the link between each verse, or tsukeai (付合). The most important rule of linking was that links could only exist between two adjacent verses, i.e. a verse could not be connected with any verses aside from the one it was being linked to. There was a wide range of types of links, from linguistic to semantic and direct to indirect; Nijō Yoshimoto listed thirteen types in his poetic treatise on renga, Renri Hishō (連理秘抄).

== The renga session ==
Renga was typically composed in sessions attended by a group of poets known as the renju (連衆, also renjū)—usually 7-8, though the number could range widely—, a scribe (執筆 shuhitsu), and a master (宗匠 sōshō). The setting of the session was called the ba (場), and was an integral part of the poetic sequence, providing aesthetic inspiration and often serving as the basis for the hokku. These sessions could take the form of more literary pedagogical events or more informal competitions that drew crowds of spectators.

The scribe sat at a low writing desk (文台 bundai), with the poets sitting facing the desk and the master beside it. The role of the scribe was not only to transcribe the renga sequence, but also to act as an enforcer of the rules of the genre. Once a poet was ready to offer a verse, he would make eye contact with and recite it to the scribe, who would then check to make sure that there were no infractions and write it down. The scribe was usually a younger, aspiring renga poet who would be able to gather experience and recognition through the session. The job required a remarkable memory, as he was required to not only remember all of the rules, but also to instantly recall all the previous verses in order to check the newest verse against them without wasting time looking through the transcription. In addition, the scribe needed both poetic and social skills in order to maintain the pace of the session. He had to decide when to enforce the rules and when to let infractions go for artistic or social reasons. Because renga sessions often gathered people from different social statuses, the scribe needed to facilitate the social dynamic and reject or accommodate verses without offending those of higher standing.

Unlike the scribe, the master was mainly in charge of the aesthetic progression of the sequence, maintaining the jōhakyū tempo, ji and mon pattern, the yukiyō, and other aspects of the flow by both judging verses and offering his own. He served as the senior poet who contributed many verses and helped other poets refine theirs, exercising a certain amount of authority over their compositions. Professional renga poets (連歌師 rengashi) such as Sōgi and his disciples would often be in high demand as masters during their travels.

At the start of the session, the scribe would receive the hokku and write it alongside the fushimono to its right. Then he would continue to receive verses; a poet would recite his verse, the scribe would recite it back, and each verse approved by the master and him would be written and recited again. Once the scribe wrote the final verse, he would count the number of verses each participant had contributed and write the tallies at the end of the last page. Finally, he bound the four pages with a string.

Many treatises and handbooks delineated the proper etiquette and conventions for renga sessions, covering everything from behavior and preparation of individual poets to the setup and dynamic of the ba. There was some variation between time periods and treatises regarding the ideal conditions of a renga session, and there were no doubt many amateur sessions across the country that did not adhere to the strict rules. As a whole, however, the renga session and its conventions played a crucial role in renga composition, and many extant renga today are products of those sessions where sequences were carefully recorded and preserved.

== Outside Japan ==
An early attempt at renga in English appeared in 1968 in Haiku Magazine, and the same magazine published an issue in 1976 devoted to renga and haibun. Since then, many English-language haiku journals have published renga, renku, and other linked poetry.

== Formats ==
Here follows a list of the most common formats in which renga have been written, both ushin (orthodox) renga, and mushin (renku)

Name of format	Number of stanzas	Number of kaishi (writing sheets)	Number of sides	Originator	Date of origin
Hyakuin	100	4	8	unknown	13th century
Senku	1000	40	80	unknown	
Gojūin	50	2	4	unknown	
Yoyoshi	44	2	4	unknown	
Kasen	36	2	4	unknown	1423
Han-kasen (i.e. half-kasen)	18	1	2	unknown	17th century
Shisan	12	2	4	Kaoru Kubota	1970s
Jūnichō	12	1	1	Shunjin Okamoto	1989
Nijūin	20	2	4	Meiga Higashi	1980s
Triparshva	22	1	3	Norman Darlington	2005
Rokku (aka on za rokku)	variable	variable	variable	Haku Asanuma	2000

== Terminology ==
- hokku (発句): The first stanza of renga with a 5-7-5 mora (sound unit) count. This stanza should be created by a special guest when present, and is considered a part of the greeting in a renga gathering. It must include a kigo (季語; "seasonal word"), as well as a kireji (切字; "cutting word"—a break in the text, usually, but not always, at the end of a line). The kigo usually references the season the renga was created in. Hokku, removed from the context of renga, eventually became the haiku poetry form.
- waki (脇): The second stanza of a renga with a 7-7 mora count. The person who helped to organize the gathering is honored with creating it.
- daisan (第三): The third stanza of a renga with a 5-7-5 mora count. It must end with the -te form of a verb to allow the next poet greater freedom in creating the stanza.
- hiraku (平句): Refers to all verses other than the hokku, waki, daisan, and ageku.
- ageku (挙句): The last stanza of a renga. Care should be taken to wrap up the renga.
- kuage (句上げ): A note made after the ageku to indicate how many ku each poet read.
- kōgyō (興行): To hold a renga gathering. May also be called chōgyō (張行).
- wakiokori (脇起り): To start with the hokku of a famous poet such as Bashō and make a new waki verse to follow on from there.
- tsukeai (付合): May also be called tsukekata (付け方) or tsukeaji (付け味). Refers to the mixing and matching of unlikely word combinations to spur imagination or evoke an image. One of the interesting features of renga.
- maeku (前句): The verse in which tsukeai happens.
- uchikoshi (打越): The verse before the maeku.
- shikimoku (式目): A set of rules to lay out the stylistic requirements for change throughout the poem and to prevent a renga from falling apart.
- renku (連句): Modern renga in Bashō's style.
- kukazu (句数): Literally, "the number of verses". When the theme of a section is a popular topic such as "Love", "Spring", or "Fall", the renga must continue on that theme for at least two verses but not more than five verses. This theme may then be dropped with one verse on any other topic.
- sarikirai (去嫌): A rule to prevent loops repeating the same image or a similar verse.
- rinne (輪廻): The name for a loop where the same theme, image, or word is repeated. Term taken from Buddhism.
- kannonbiraki (観音開き): A type of loop where the uchikoshi and tsukeku have an identical image or theme.
- haramiku (孕み句): A stanza prepared beforehand. Should be avoided as stanzas should be created on the spot.
- asaru (求食る): To make two stanzas in a row. Happens frequently when the degachi rule is used. Should be avoided to let others join.
- degachi (出勝ち): A rule to use the stanza of the first poet to create one.
- hizaokuri (膝送り): A rule whereby each poet takes a turn to make a stanza.
- renju (連衆): The members of a renga or haikai gathering. The members of a renga gathering are also called kaishū (会衆).
- ichiza (一座): Literally, "one seating". Describes the group when the renju are seated and the renga has begun.
- sōshō (宗匠): May also be called sabaki (捌き). The coordinator of an ichiza, he or she is responsible for the completion of a renga. Has the authority to dismiss an improper verse. The most experienced of the renju should be the sōshō to keep the renga interesting.
- kyaku (客): The main guest of the ichiza and responsible for creating the hokku.
- teishu (亭主): The patron of a renga gathering, who provides the place.
- shuhitsu (執筆): The "secretary" of the renga, as it were, who is responsible for writing down renga verses and for the proceedings of the renga.
- bunnin (文音): Using letters (i.e. the post), telegraph, telephone, or even fax machines for making a renga. Using the internet is also considered a form of bunnin.
- yukiyō (行様): The flow of the sequence created by the patterns of links and the shifting of the verses.

== See also ==
- Collaborative poetry
- Exquisite corpse
- Hokku, the opening verse of renga and renku, as well as a standalone 17-mora poem, which developed into the independent haiku and senryū
- Renku, the popular derivative of renga, which reached its artistic peak in the 17th century
- Renri Hishō, an influential text on renga poetics
- Renshi, modern development of renga and renku
