= Teijo Nakamura =

Japanese haiku poet (1900–1988)

- 中村 汀女
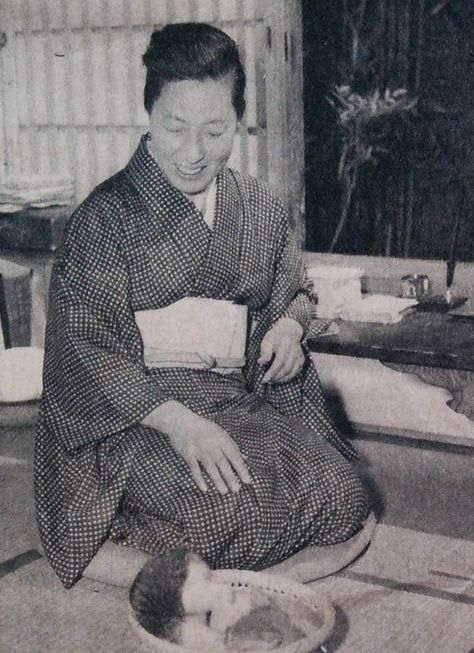
- Teijo Nakamura, 1952.
- Born: Hamako Saitō (斎藤 破魔子); 11 April 1900; Kumamoto City, Kumamoto, Japan
- Died: 20 September 1988 (aged 88); Tokyo, Japan
- Occupation: Haiku Poet
- Spouse: Shigeki Nakamura
- Children: Namiko Ogawa
- Writing career
- Genre: Daidokoro Haiku
- Notable awards: Japan Art Academy Prize (1984)

Teijo Nakamura (中村 汀女, なかむら ていじょ, April 11, 1900 – Sept. 20, 1988) was the pen name of Japanese haiku poet Hamako Saitō (斎藤 破魔子, さいとう はまこ). She was a prolific poet and one of the founding leaders of the women's haiku circle at Hototogisu, and is credited with championing women's inclusion in the world of haiku. Alongside three of the other members of her literary circle, Teijo's work is considered to typify women's haiku of the Showa period.

== Personal life ==
Teijo was born on April 11, 1900, in Kumamoto Prefecture, Japan, in the village Ezu (now a district of modern-day Kumamoto City). Born Hamako Saitō, Teijo was the only child of Heishirō Saitō, the village headman, and his wife Tei. In 1912, Teijo entered Kumamoto Prefectural Girl's High School (now Kumamoto Prefectural High School No. 1). Teijo graduated in 1918 and began submitting haiku to the literary magazine Hototogisu the same year. She also sent in fan letters for Hisajo Sugita, another female haiku poet who had begun publishing in the magazine the year prior. Later, after Sugita visited Ezu in September, 1921, the pair would become long-time correspondents.

In 1920, Teijo married Shigeki Nakamura, a bureaucrat in the Ministry of Finance. The pair moved several times for Shigeki's work, including to Yokohama, Sendai, and Nagoya, before finally settling in Tokyo. The couple had three children, including a son, their daughter Namiko, born in 1924, and another daughter.

Teijo was named a Person of Cultural Merit by the Japanese government in 1980 due to her poetic contributions, which provided her with a government pension in addition to national recognition. In 1984, she was awarded the Japan Art Academy Prize for poetry, and officially listed as a distinguished citizen of both Tokyo and Kumamoto City for her work. Teijo died of heart failure on September 20, 1988, at Tokyo Women's Medical University Hospital. Her grave is located in Tsukiji Hongan-ji in Suginami, Tokyo. Following Teijo's death in 1988, her oldest daughter, Namiko Ogawa, took over editorship of Kazabana, and developed a reputation as a poet in her own right.

== Literary career ==
Teijo was a prolific poet through most of her adult life. Her first published haiku, 「吾に返り見直す隅に寒菊紅し」received high praise and led her to publish more of her work. Following the birth of her first child, Teijo retired from writing for almost ten years, until Sugita urged Teijo to return to poetry around 1932. Following the end of World War II, in 1947 Teijo founded and supervised the haiku magazine Kazabana. Teijo also published books on composing and appreciating haiku.

=== The 4 T's ===
Following Teijo's return to haiku in 1932, she quickly became acquainted with Takahama Kyoshi, the editor of Hototogisu at the time, and his daughter Tatsuko Hoshino, a fellow poet. Alongside Takako Hashimoto and Takajo Mitsuhashi, Teijo and Tatsuko headed the women's haiku literary circle at Hototogisu. The group would later be dubbed the "4 T's", and are each considered notable poets in their own right. Teijo and Tatsuko in particular, shared an amicable artistic rivalry. Teijo's first collection of haiku, Spring Snow (春雪,しゅんせつ, Shunsetsu) was published in 1940 alongside Tatsuko's book Kamakura, and the two works—which shared an introduction by Kyoshi—were considered sister publications because of the authors' close ties. The pair also later co-edited the collection Gozen Kushū in 1947, in which each chose a selection of the other's work to share.

== Themes and influence ==
Teijo's work is noted for its lyricism and focus on everyday life from a feminine perspective, especially topics such as motherhood. Teijo's style is often cited as an example of "Kitchen Haiku" (台所俳句、だいどころはいく, daidokoro haiku), which was an at times disparaging name given to the works of women haiku poets in the early 20th century. The name derives from Hototogisu's "Kitchen Miscellanies" (だいどころぞうえい, Daidokoro Zōei) column, which published the work of female poets like Hisajo and Teijo. Takahama Kyoshi, the magazine's editor, also encouraged the female poets he mentored to focus their works on the idea of the kitchen and other 'feminine' topics. Teijo embraced this label, however, arguing in her autobiography that: "For ordinary women, we can think of our workplace as being the home, and the heart of that is the kitchen. So why shouldn't I gather material from there?" Alongside her female peers of the "4 T's", Teijo's work is credited with opening up the male-dominated world of haiku to the ordinary women of Japan.

== Selected bibliography ==
- Shunsetsu (春雪). Sanseidō. 1940.
- Teijo Kushū (汀女句集). Kōchō Shorin. 1944
- Gozen Kushū (互選句集). co-edited with Tatsuko Hoshino. Bungei Shunju. 1947.
- Hanakage (花影). Sanyū. 1948.
- Miyakodori (都鳥). Kōchō Shorin. 1951.
- Haiku no Tsukurikata (俳句の作り方). Shufunotomo. 1953.
- Furusato no Kashi (ふるさとの菓子). Chūōkōron. 1955.
- Onna no Shiki (をんなの四季). Asahi Shimbun. 1956.
- Fujin Saijiki Gendai Haiku no Tebiki (婦人歳時記 現代俳句の手びき). Jitsugyo no Nihon Sha. 1956.
- Haha no Kokoro (母のこころ). David. 1957.
- Kyō no Haiku (今日の俳句). Shida Shoten. 1957.
- Nakamura Teijo Kushū (中村汀女句集). Kadogawa. 1960.
- Ashita no Hana (明日の花). Fuzambo. 1963.
- Kōhaku Ume (紅白梅). Hakuō. 1968.
- Haiku no Tanoshiku (俳句をたのしく). Shufunotomo. 1968.
- Kaze to Hana no Ki (風と花の記). Geijutsu Seikatsu. 1973.
- Tegami no Kakikata Moratte Ureshii Tegami to wa (手紙の書き方 もらってうれしい手紙とは). Kobunsha.1973.
- Nakamura Teijo Haiku Shūsei (中村汀女俳句集成). Tokyo Shinbun. 1974.
- Teijo Jigazō (汀女自画像). Shufunotomo. 1974.
- Dentō no Meika Kushū (伝統の銘菓句集). Kagawa Nutrition University Press. 1977.
- Sono Hi no Kaze (その日の風). Kyūryūdō. 1979.
- Hana Kushū (花句集). Kyūryūdō. 1979.
- Kyō no Kaze, Kyō no Hana (今日の風今日の花). Kairyū. 1983.
- Shiki no Meika Goyomi Kushū (四季の銘菓ごよみ 句集). Kagawa Nutrition University Press. 1985.
- Mitsubachi no Hako (蜜蜂の箱). Tōsei. 1986.
- Kono Hi Aru Tanoshisa (この日ある愉しさ). Tōsei. 1986.
- Hajimete Haiku o Tsukuru (はじめて俳句を作る). Shufunotomo. 1986.
- Nakamura Teijo Haiku Nyūmon (中村汀女俳句入門). Tachibana. 2000.
- Nakamura Teijo Zenkushū (中村汀女全句集). Mainichi Shimbun. 2002.

== See also ==
- Hototogisu
- Tatsuko Hoshino
- Takajo Mitsuhashi
- Takako Hashimoto
- Hisajo Sugita
