= 1903 in poetry =

This article covers 1903 in poetry. Nationality words link to articles with information on the nation's poetry or literature (for instance, Irish or France).

== Works published in English ==
=== Australia ===
- Gün Gencer, General Poems: Australia facing the dawn and its result, published by the author, printed in Sydney by R.T. Kelly
- Allen Gilfillen, A Day, Melbourne: Melville and Mullen, drama and poetry
- Lilian Wooster Greaves, Poems by Lilian, Newtown, New South Wales: G. Baker Walker
- Bernard O'Dowd, Dawnward?, Australia
- Banjo Paterson, "Waltzing Matilda", Australia's most widely known bush ballad

=== Canada ===
- Bliss Carman, From the Green Book of Bards
- E. Pauline Johnson, also known as "Tekahionwake", Canadian Born
- Charles G. D. Roberts, The Book of the Rose

=== United Kingdom ===
- Robert Bridges, Now in Wintry Delights
- Anne Finch, Countess of Winchilsea (died 1720), The Poems of Anne, Countess of Winchilsea, edited by Myra Reynolds
- W. E. Henley, A Song of Speed
- Rudyard Kipling, The Five Nations
- Thomas MacDonagh, April and May, Irish poet published in Ireland
- John Masefield, Ballads
- Alfred Noyes, The Flower of Old Japan
- 'Æ' (George William Russell), The Nuts of Knowledge, lyrical poems old and new
- Thomas Traherne (died 1674), The Poetical Works of Thomas Traherne
- W. B. Yeats, Irish poet published in the United Kingdom:
  - In the Seven Woods, being poems of the Irish heroic age including "Adam's Curse", "The King's Threshold" and "The Hour-Glass"
  - Ideas of Good and Evil, essays, including essays on Edmund Spenser, Percy Shelley and William Blake (criticism)

=== United States ===
- Ambrose Bierce, Shapes of Clay
- Willa Cather, Shapes of Clay
- H. L. Mencken, Ventures into Verse
- Josephine Preston Peabody, The Singing Leaves
- George Sterling, The Testimony of the Suns
- J. T. Trowbridge, Poetical Works

=== Other in English ===
- Yone Noguchi, From the Eastern Sea
- N. W. Pai, The Angel of Misfortune: A Fairy Tale, A Metrical Romance in Ten Books, Bombay: W. N. Mulgaokar and Co.India, Indian poetry in English
- W. B. Yeats, Irish poet published in the United Kingdom:
  - In the Seven Woods, being poems of the Irish heroic age including "Adam's Curse", "The King's Threshold" and "The Hour-Glass"
  - Ideas of Good and Evil, essays, including essays on Edmund Spenser, Percy Shelley and William Blake (criticism)

== Works published in other languages ==
- Konstantin Balmont, Будем как Солнце (Budem kak Solntse), Russia
- Paul Claudel, Art poétique, criticism; France
- Kavi Dalpatram Nanalal, Katlank Kavyo, Indian, Gujarati-language
- Saint-Pol-Roux, pen name of Paul Roux, Anciennetés, France

== Births ==
Death years link to the corresponding "[year] in poetry" article:

- April 3 – Peter Huchel (died 1981), German poet
- May 25 – Ewart Milne (died 1987), Irish poet and radical
- May 30 – Countee Cullen (died 1946), African-American poet
- June 13 – Sanjayan, pen name of M. R. Nayar (died 1943), Indian, Malayalam-language poet
- June 17 – Jyoti Prasad Agarwala (died 1953), playwright, songwriter, poet, writer and film maker; Indian, writing in Assamese
- September 9 – Atul Chandra Hazarika (died 1986), poet, dramatist, children's story writer and translator; called "Sahitycharjya" by an Assamese literary society; Indian, writing in Assamese
- October 5 – Yaho Kitabatake 北畠 八穂 (died 1982), Japanese Shōwa period poet and children's fiction writer
- November 6 – Carl Rakosi (died 2004), German-born American poet
- November 15:
  - Tatsuko Hoshino 星野立子 (died 1984), Japanese Shōwa period haiku poet and travel writer; founded Tamamo, a haiku magazine exclusively for women; in the Hototogisu literary circle; haiku selector for Asahi Shimbun newspaper; contributed to haiku columns in various newspapers and magazines (a woman)
  - Jinzai Kiyoshi 神西清 (died 1957) Japanese Shōwa period novelist, translator, literary critic, poet and playwright
- December 4 – A. L. Rowse (died 1997), English poet, historian and Shakespeare scholar and biographer
- December 10 – William Plomer (died 1973), South African-born novelist, poet, literary editor and librettist
- December 31:
  - Fumiko Hayashi 林 芙美子 (born this year or 1904 (sources disagree); died 1951), Japanese novelist, writer and poet (a woman)
  - Lorine Niedecker (died 1970) the only woman associated with the Objectivist poets
- Also:
  - Raymond Herbert McGrath (died 1977), Australian poet
  - Rafael Méndez Dorich (died 1973), Peruvian poet

== Deaths ==
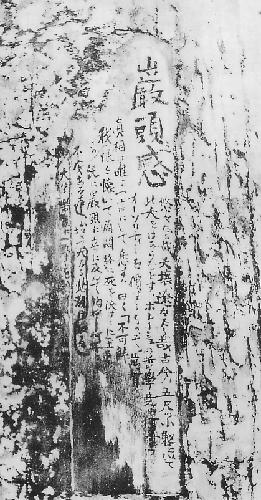
Tree on which Misao Fujimura wrote his final poem

- March 20 – Charles Godfrey Leland (born 1824), American humorist, folklorist and poet
- May 8 – David Mills (born 1831), Canadian politician and poet
- May 22 – Misao Fujimura, 藤村操 (born 1886), Japanese philosophy student and poet, largely remembered for the poem he carved into a tree before committing suicide over an unrequited love; made famous by Japanese newspapers after his death (see picture at right)
- July 11 – W. E. Henley (born 1849), English poet, critic and editor
- September 3 – Joseph Skipsey "The Pitman Poet" (born 1832), English collier and poet
- October 30 – Ozaki Kōyō 尾崎 紅葉, pen name of Ozaki Tokutarō 尾崎 徳太郎 (born 1868), Japanese novelist, essayist and haiku poet
- December – Isa Craig (born 1831), Scottish-born poet

== See also ==
- 20th century in poetry
- 20th century in literature
- List of years in poetry
- List of years in literature
- French literature of the 20th century
- Silver Age of Russian Poetry
- Young Poland (Młoda Polska) a modernist period in Polish arts and literature, roughly from 1890 to 1918
- Poetry
