= Yamaguchi Seishi =

Japanese poet

- 山口誓子
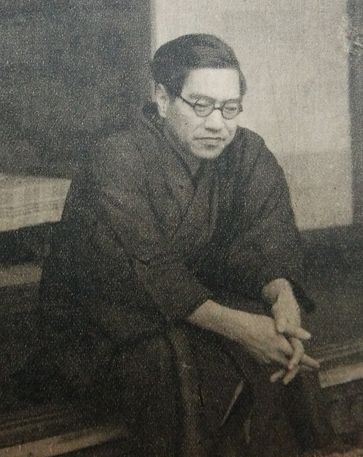
- Born: November 3, 1901; Kyoto
- Died: March 26, 1994
- Occupation: Writer

Yamaguchi Seishi (山口誓子; November 3, 1901 – March 26, 1994) was a Japanese haiku poet.

== Early life ==
Yamaguchi Seishi was born on November 3, 1901, in Kyoto. His father, an electrical engineer, took him at age eleven to Karafuto Prefecture on Sakhalin Island, where his grandfather ran a newspaper press. Yamaguchi left Karafuto permanently in 1917, but the desolate winter landscape there would feature often in his poetry.

Yamaguchi attended the Third Higher School in Kyoto and joined the student haiku society, where he met poet Sōjō Hino. In 1922, he met Kyoshi Takahama, the doyen of the traditionalist school of haiku centered on the magazine Hototogisu ("Cuckoo"). Kyoshi encouraged Yamaguchi and the latter's poems began to regularly appear in Hototogisu. Yamaguchi attended Tokyo University, where he was a founding member of the Tokyo University Haiku Society. He graduated in 1926 with a Bachelor of Laws and began working for an Osaka commercial firm. He also came down with a serious of illnesses that would plague him for the rest of his life, eventually contracting pleurisy.

In 1932, he released his first volume of haiku, Tōkō ("Frozen Harbor"). Along with Katsushika by Shūōshi Mizuhara, it is considered by critics to be one of the collections to have done the most to modernize the form. Yamaguchi wrote haiku on unconventional subjects such as steam engines, dance halls, skating rinks, board meetings, typists, sports, and parades. Eventually he broke with Kyoshi and the conservative Hototogisu school in 1935 and joined Shūōshi's publication Ashibi ("Staggerbush"). In 1948 he started his own publication, Tenrō ("Dog Star"), where he was joined by his disciple Takako Hashimoto (1899-1963), a poet who was sometimes called the "female Seishi".

Yamaguchi eventually published over a dozen volumes of haiku, including Kōki ("Yellow Flag", 1935), Gekirō ("Raging Waves", 1944), Wafuku ("Japanese Clothing", 1955), and Setsugaku (1985), and numerous essay collections.
