= Masato Uchida =

Japanese composer and teacher (1940–1997)

Masato Uchida (内田 勝人, Uchida Masato; September 21, 1940 – December 30, 1997) was a Japanese composer of contemporary classical music.

== Biography ==
Uchida was born in Tokyo, Japan. He studied at the Tokyo University of the Arts under Tomojirō Ikenouchi, Akio Yashiro and Akira Miyoshi and continued his studies from 1965 at the Conservatoire de Paris under André Jolivet, Henri Dutilleux and Simone Plé-Caussade. In 1968 Masato Uchida returned to the Tokyo University of the Arts and graduated in 1971. During his last study years he founded the composer group "whitecap" (jap. 白波) together with Shigeaki Saegusa, Shin-ichiro Ikebe and Norio Fukushi.

After his graduation Uchida worked as a composer and teacher. He became a professor at the Tokyo Junshin Women's College, later also at the Tokyo University of the Arts and the Kyoto City University of Arts. From the 1970s he was also a member of the Victor Music Classroom Project, a Japanese organization which was part of the Victor Company of Japan and specialized in teaching children to play piano on the JVC keyboards. Uchida composed several compositions for piano student for this project. In 1990 he became the director of the Victor Technics Music School and worked as a consultant until his death. He died in Tokyo.

== Compositions ==
- Thravsma I, for 2 flutes
- Thravsma II
- Thravsma III, for piano, violin and cello (1967), published by JFC
- Thravsma IV
- Thravsma V, for clarinet, 2 violins, viola and cello (1970), published by JFC
- Meteora series, for example Meteora II, for marimba
- Requiem
- Several compositions for piano students
