= Shin'ichirō Ikebe =

Japanese composer (born 1943)

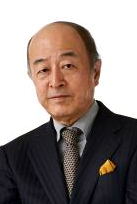
- Born: 池邉 晋一郎; September 15, 1943 (age 82); Mito, Ibaraki, Japan
- Other name: 池辺 晋一郎
- Occupation: Composer

Shin'ichirō Ikebe (Japanese: 池辺 晋一郎 Ikebe Shin'ichirō; born September 15, 1943, in Mito, Ibaraki) is a Japanese composer of contemporary classical music.

== Overviews ==
He has written the scores for many films by Akira Kurosawa and other Japanese film directors, including Kagemusha (1980), MacArthur's Children (1984), Kurosawa's Dreams (1990), Rhapsody in August (1991), Madadayo (1993), and Warm Water Under a Red Bridge (2001).

== Biography ==
He studied composition with Tomojirō Ikenouchi, Akio Yashiro, and Akira Miyoshi at the Tokyo National University of Fine Arts and Music, obtaining a master's degree in 1971. He serves as a professor at the Tokyo College of Music. He had several awards up to 2004, such as Excellence at the Salzburg TV Opera, The Italian Broadcasting Corporation, that is, RAI, The International Emmy Award, the Otaka Award, Broadcasting Culture Award, Yoshio Sagawa incentive Award, Medal with Purple Ribbon.

== Selected works ==
- Symphony no. 3
- Symphony no. 5 "Simplex"
- Music to "Kagemusha"
- War song
- Spirit in the fields
- Sanshuu Road
- Dreams

== List of works ==
=== Symphonies ===
- Symphony No. 1, 1967
- Petite symphonie, 1969 (rev. 1973)
- Symphony No. 2 "Trias", 1979
- Symphony No. 3 "Ego phano", 1984
- Symphony No. 4, 1990
- Symphony No. 5 "Simplex", 1990
- Symphony No. 6 "On the Individual Coordinates", 1993
- Symphony No. 7 "To the Sympathy for a Drip", 1999
- Symphony No. 8 "The Earth/Prayer", 2013
- Symphony No. 9 for soprano, baritone and orchestra, 2013
- Symphony No. 10 "For the Coming Era", 2015

=== Orchestral works ===
- Movement for Orchestra, 1964
- Construction, two pieces for orchestra, 1966
- Energeia for 60 musicians, 1970
- Haru-no-umi for Orchestra, 1980
- Elegiac Lines for strings, 1982
- Imagine for orchestra, 1983
- Overture for the Time of Flying Star, 1984
- Overture for the Coming of the New Spring, paraphrase of Antonio Vivaldi and homage to Maurice Ravel, 1986
- Mandolin Mandoriale for mandolin orchestra, 1986
- Overture or Nile, 1988
- Overture "Mito", 1989
- River/Shout, symphonic piece, 1988
- Fantasy of Kyushu, symphonic piece, 1989
- Spontaneous Ignition for orchestra, 1989
- Overture for the song lovers, 1990
- Hokkai, symphonic piece, 1992
- Fantasy of Ryukyu, symphonic piece, 1993
- Mountain/Fragrant, symphonic piece, 1994
- The Glossy-Leaved Forest for strings, 1995
- Les bois tristes for orchestra, 1998
- The Echo of K Ai for orchestra, 1999
- Saka-Sakasa-Kasa, march concertante, 2000–02
- Prelude for Celebration, 2000
- The Origin of Water for orchestra, 2001
- Fanfare for the Tokyo Symphony Orchestra, 2002
- Fan-Faring for orchestra and mixed choir, 2002
- The Chronicle of 3776 Meters for orchestra, 2003
- After the Dreams, 2003
- Tanada I for orchestra, 2004
- The Warmth in Your Home for orchestra, 2004
- Falling Particles of... for chamber orchestra, 2005
- Nakatsugawa, 2005
- Ouju Gaga for gagaku, 2009
- Perennial Prelude, 2010
- Prelude for the Next Times, 2011

=== Works for wind ensemble ===
- I hear the piano... Amadeus for two wind groups and organ, 1983
- Landscape for wind ensemble, 1989
- The Times of Quickening for wind ensemble, 1999
- Fanfare for the Coming Era for brass octet, 2015

=== Concertante works ===
- Piano Concerto No. 1, 1967
- Dimorphism for organ and orchestra, 1974
- Quadrants for Japanese instruments and orchestra, 1974
- Violin Concerto, 1981
- Echigo-Jishi for sangen (shamisen) and orchestra, 1983
- Piano Concerto No. 2, 1987
- Cello Concerto "Almost a tree", 1996
- Bassoon Concerto "The License of Blaze", 1999-2004
- Flute Concerto "Sitting on a Sand, Face to Face", 2003
- Sangen (Shamisen) Concerto "As a Shade Tree", 2005
- Mandolin Mandoriale 2 for mandolin orchestra, 2006
- Harp Concerto "Luminescence on Ice", 2007
- Piano Concerto (for left hand) No. 3 "To a West Wind", 2013

=== Operas, cantatas and musicals ===
- The Death Goddess, opera, 1971
- A Red Shoes, musical drama, 1975
- The Silence, musical drama for radio, 1977
- The Adventure of Pinocchio, musical, 1981
- On ne badine pas avec l'amour, musical, 1982
- Hoichi, the earless, opera, 1982
- Never ending story, musical, 1984
- Taro in the Wonder Woods, musical, 1985
- The Window, musical drama, 1986
- Chichibu-Bansho, opera, 1988
- Carmen, Capriccio Based on Georges Bizet, 1989
- For a Beautiful Star, cantata, 1990
- Watatsumi no iroko no miya, cantata, 1990
- Shin, Zen, Bi, cantata, 1994
- Oshichi, opera, 1995
- The Down/Ocean, Mountain, Rivers and Human Beings, cantata, 1996
- Dugong's Lullaby, opera, 1996
- Freezing Field... Glaring, cantata, 1996
- Yobikawasu sanga, oratorio, 2001
- Takagami, opera, 2001
- The forrests are living, musical, 2003
- Kotsuru, opera, 2003
- Onihachi, opera, 2004
- Sagan Rhapsody, 2004
- The Path of Spiritual Growth, cantata, 2006
- Cursor, musical, 2007
- The Bridge, cantata, 2007
- Umi yo. haha yo, cantata, 2008
- Rokumeikan (鹿鳴館), opera, 2010, premiered by the New National Theatre Tokyo in 2010

=== Ballets and dance music ===
- Kusabi, dance music, 1972
- Creature, ballet, 1974
- Oshichi, She Is in the Flame, dance music, 1978
- Takeru, dance music, 1979
- Cleopatra—Her Love and Death, ballet, 1983
- Mobile et Immobile, ballet, 1984
- Mizu-kuguru monogatari, dance music, 1984
- To-to taru, ichiitai-sui, ballet, 1986
- For the Earth, dance music, 1989

=== Film scores ===
- Vengeance is Mine (director: Shōhei Imamura, 1979)
- Kagemusha (director: Akira Kurosawa, 1980)
- Himeyuri no Tō (director: Tadashi Imai, 1982)
- The Ballad of Narayama (director: Shōhei Imamura, 1983)
- Okinawan Boys (director: Taku Shinjō, 1983)
- MacArthur's Children (director: Masahiro Shinoda, 1984)
- Gray Sunset (director: Shunya Itō, 1985)
- Dreams (director: Akira Kurosawa, 1990)
- Takeshi - Childhood Days (director: Masahiro Shinoda, 1990)
- Rhapsody in August (director: Akira Kurosawa, 1991)
- Madadayo (director: Akira Kurosawa, 1993)
- The Eel (director: Shōhei Imamura, 1997)
- Colorful (director: Shun Nakahara, 2000)
- Spy Sorge (director: Masahiro Shinoda, 2003)
- The Milkwoman (director: Akira Ogata, 2005)
- Baruto no Gakuen (director: Masanobu Deme, 2006)
- Glory to the Filmmaker! (director: Takeshi Kitano, 2007)

=== Television scores ===
- Future Boy Conan (director: Hayao Miyazaki, 1978)

== Honours ==
- Medal with Purple Ribbon (2004)
- Person of Cultural Merit (2018)
- Order of the Rising Sun, 3rd Class, Gold Rays with Neck Ribbon (2022)
