= Mitsuhashi Takajo =

Japanese haiku poet

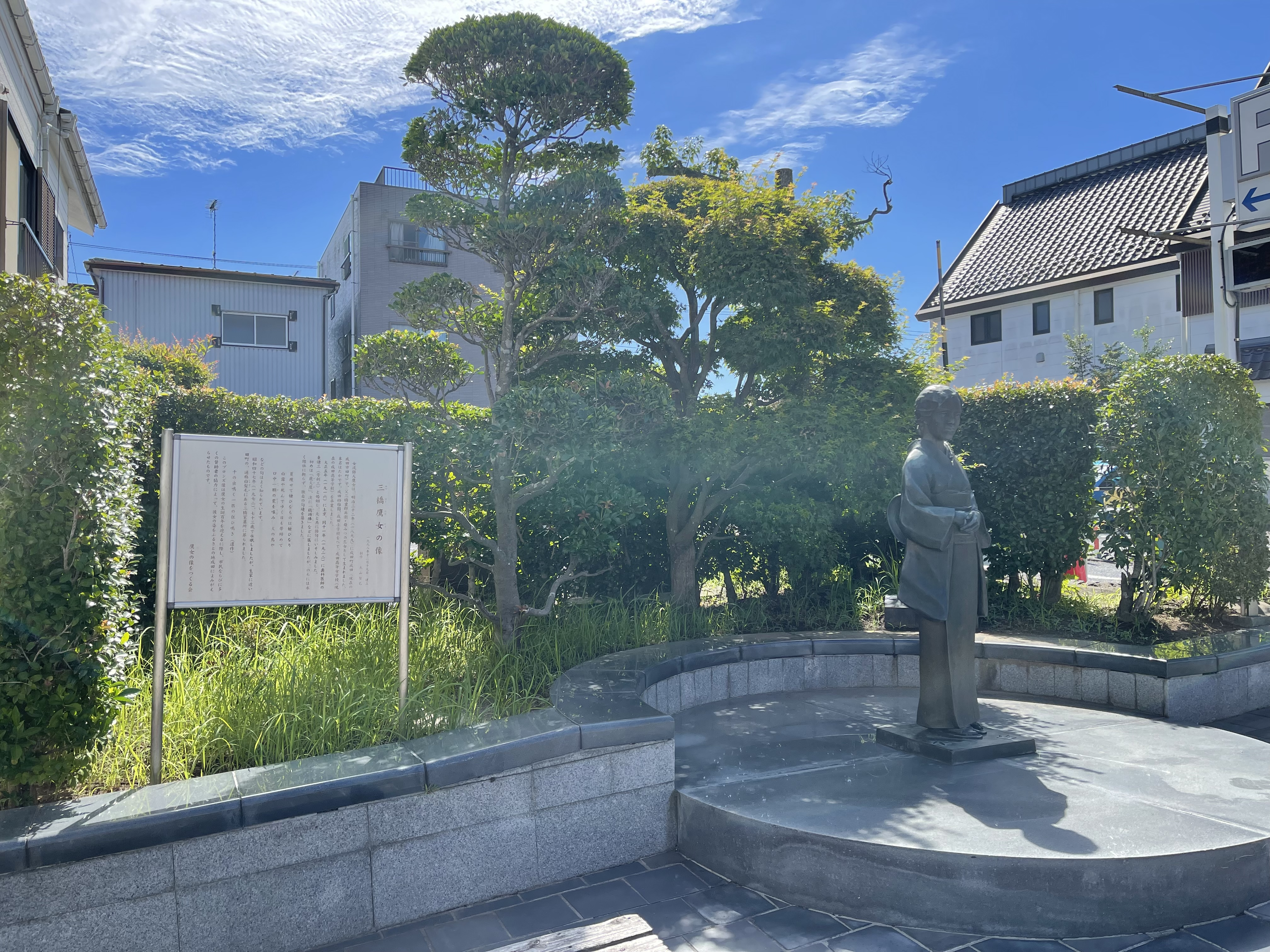
Statue of Mitsuhashi Takajo

Mitsuhashi Takajo or Takajo Mitsuhashi (三橋 鷹女; born Fumiko Matsuhashi (三橋 たか) near Narita, Chiba on 24 January 1899; died 7 April 1972) was a haiku poet of the Shōwa period.

== Biography ==
Mitsuhashi Takajo was born near Narita. She was an admirer of Akiko Yosano and her father wrote tanka. In 1922 she married Kenzō (東 謙三), a dentist who wrote haiku and who influenced her to switch to haiku herself. By 1936 she became part of a group that founded the short-lived Kon (dark blue) publication and in 1940 had the collection Himawari or Sunflowers published. The war proved difficult for her family and in 1953 she became involved in a progressive magazine of avant-garde poets who allowed experimental haiku. Her last collection, in 1970, dealt somewhat with death as she had been ill for years.

== Legacy and image ==
She has been referred to as a religious ascetic or one who led a life of asceticism and spiritual concentration. She is said to have written works of self-alienation and the Void. A statue of her is at Shinshoji Temple.

She is one of the "4 Ts" of Japanese female haiku poets. The other three are Tatsuko Hoshino, Teijo Nakamura, and Takako Hashimoto.
