= Tatsuko Hoshino =

Japanese writer

- 星野 立子
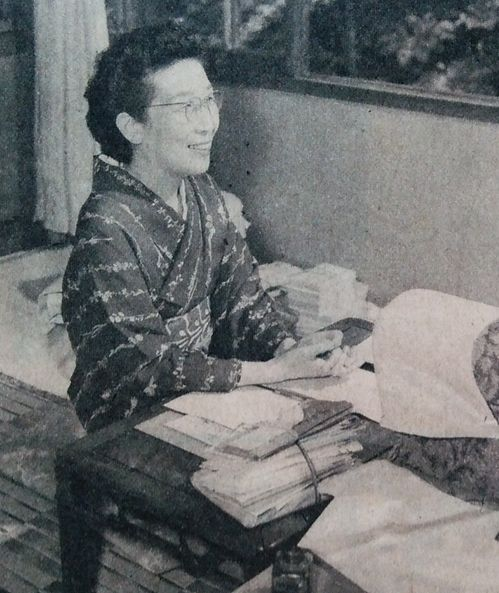
- Born: 15 November 1903; Tokyo, Japan
- Died: 3 March 1984 (aged 80); Kamakura, Kanagawa, Japan
- Resting place: Jufuku-ji, Kamakura, Japan
- Occupation: writer
- Writing career
- Language: Japanese
- Genre: haiku poetry
- Literary movement: Hototogisu

Tatsuko Hoshino (星野 立子, Hoshino Tatsuko; 15 November 1903 – 3 March 1984) was a Japanese haiku poet active in Shōwa period Japan.

== Early life ==
Hoshino was born in Kōjimachi, Tokyo, as the daughter of the poet and novelist Takahama Kyoshi. She attended the preparatory school for Tokyo Woman's Christian University. After her marriage to the grandson of Hoshino Tenchi, she was encouraged by her father to start writing haiku and soon showed an amazing talent.

== Literary career ==
In 1930 Hoshino founded a haiku magazine exclusively for women called Tamamo. Two years later, she joined the Hototogisu literary circle and shared the position of leading female haiku poet with Teijo Nakamura. The two were later joined by Takako Hashimoto and Takajo Mitsuhashi.

In 1937 Hoshino published her first haiku anthology, which was followed by other volumes including Kamakura, Sasame and Jitsui. Her style remained faithful to her father's insistence on traditional forms, and on the use of natural symbolism, but was tempered with her love of nature and a soft, feminine approach to daily life.

After her father's death, Hoshino became the haiku selector for Asahi Shimbun newspaper, and contributed to haiku columns in various newspapers and magazines.

In addition to haiku, she also published travel documentaries, including Tamamo haiwa ("Stories of the Tamamo Group") and Yamato Seki-Butsu ("Stone Buddhas of Yamato").

Hoshino began living in Kamakura, Kanagawa prefecture in 1911 and following a short period in Tokyo, she returned to Kamakura in 1931, believing it to be an ideal place to bring up her children. She died in 1984 at the age of 80. Her grave is at the temple of Jufuku-ji in Kamakura.

She is one of the "4 Ts" of Japanese female haiku poets; the other three are Takajo Mitsuhashi, Teijo Nakamura, and Takako Hashimoto.

== See also ==
- Japanese literature
- List of Japanese authors
