= Sōjō Hino =

Japanese poet and writer

- 日野 草城
- Born: July 18, 1901; Tokyo
- Died: January 29, 1956
- Occupation: Poet

Sōjō Hino (日野 草城; July 18, 1901 – January 29, 1956) was a Japanese poet. His haiku involved subjects then considered controversial for the form, including erotic sexuality, fictionalized scenarios, and mundane topics outside of nature.

== Biography ==
Sōjō Hino was born on July 18, 1901, in Tokyo. He grew up in Keijo, South Korea, where his father worked during the Japanese occupation of Korea. His father was an amateur poet of haiku and tanka. During middle school, Sōjō himself began submitting haiku to Hototogisu ("Cuckoo"), the leading Japanese literary journal of the form, edited by the traditionalist poet Kyoshi Takahama. He came to prominence at age twenty in 1921 when one of his haiku was highlighted in Hototogisu. He later became an editor at the publication.

Sōjō attended the Third Higher School in Kyoto in 1918, then studied law at Kyoto University. He founded the student club the Kyo-Kanoko Haiku Society, which was later opened to the general public. In 1924, he was hired Osaka Marine and Fire Insurance Company and worked there for two decades, eventually becoming head of the Kobe branch of the successor company Osaka Sumitomo Marine and Fire Insurance in 1944.

While initially a traditionalist poet, he grew increasingly experimental in his late 20s. "My guiding principle is not to be bound by principles," he said. In 1934 he published a 10-poem rensaku - a series of haiku about the same experience - featuring a fictionalized version of his honeymoon. The erotic and experimental content was considered extremely controversial. He wrote about a number of other non-traditional themes and advocated abandoning the kigo (the seasonal word) in haiku. He became the advisor of a new radical haiku magazine, Kyodai Haiku, and started one of his own, Kikan. Eventually was expelled from the traditionalist Hototogisu group in 1936.

Starting in 1945, his life was marked by a series of misfortunes. He lost most of his possessions in an air raid that year. Then he contracted pulmonary tuberculosis. In 1951, he lost sight in his right eye due to glaucoma. His right lung collapsed and he spent most of his last years bedridden. Sōjō Hino died on 29 January 1956.
