= Sokotsu Samukawa =

Japanese writer (1875–1954)

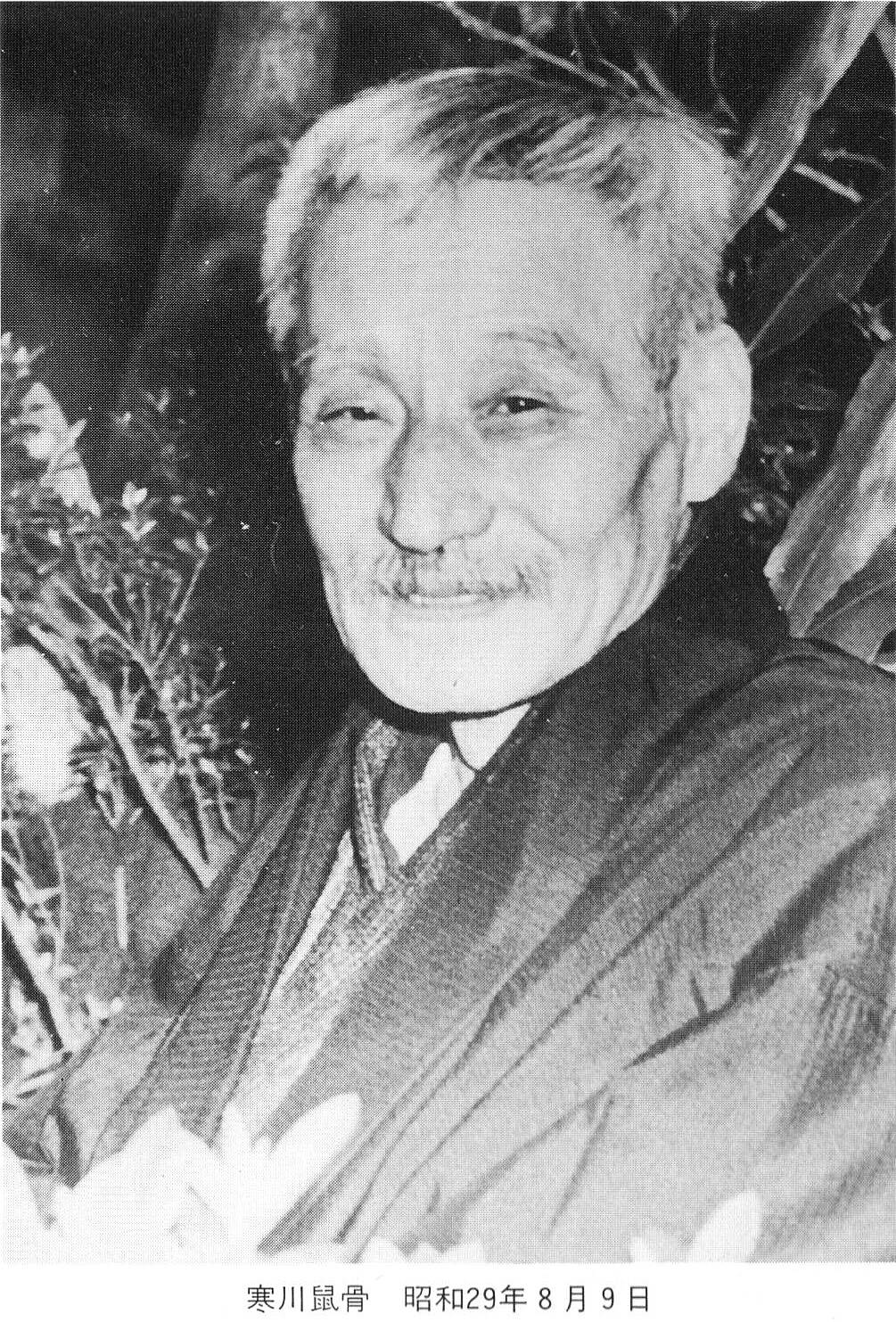
Samukawa Sokotsu in 1954

Sokotsu Samukawa (寒川 鼠骨, Samukawa Sokotsu; November 3, 1875 – August 18, 1954) was a Haiku poet in Japan during the Meiji period. Sokotsu was a pen name and his real name was Akimitsu (陽光).

== Life ==
Samukawa was born in Matsuyama (now in Ehime Prefecture) on November 3, 1875. He became a student at Daisan Kōtō gakkō (now Kyoto University) in 1894. Samukawa met Kawahigashi Hekigotō and Takahama Kyoshi at this school. He fell under their influence and took part in Keihan-Mangetsukai (京阪満月会, Haiku club). Samukawa was so absorbed in writing haiku that in the end, he dropped out of the school. He worked at the Kyoto Newspaper and the Osaka Asahi Newspaper and continued to contribute haiku to the magazine Hototogisu even while he worked.

Samukawa went to Tokyo and joined the staff of the newspaper Nippon in 1898. He met the journalist Kuga Katsunan and Masaoka Shiki there. Samukawa became Shiki's pupil and studied the narrative prose, or the sketch in prose, that Shiki propounded. After Shiki's death, Samukawa stopped writing Hokku poetry and concentrated on writing prose, travel sketches and essays. He devoted the rest of his life from 1911 onwards to keeping Shiki's house and estate.

== Works ==
- Samukawa-Sokotsu-Shū (寒川鼠骨集): A selection
- Masaoka Shiki no Sekai (正岡子規の世界): The introduction of Masaoka Shiki
