= Bandō prisoner-of-war camp =

Japanese camp for German prisoners during World War I

Coordinates: 34°9′33″N 134°29′47″E

Bandō POW camp
- Bandō Furyoshūyōsho (Japanese); 板東俘虜収容所 (Japanese); Kriegsgefangenenlager Bandō (German)
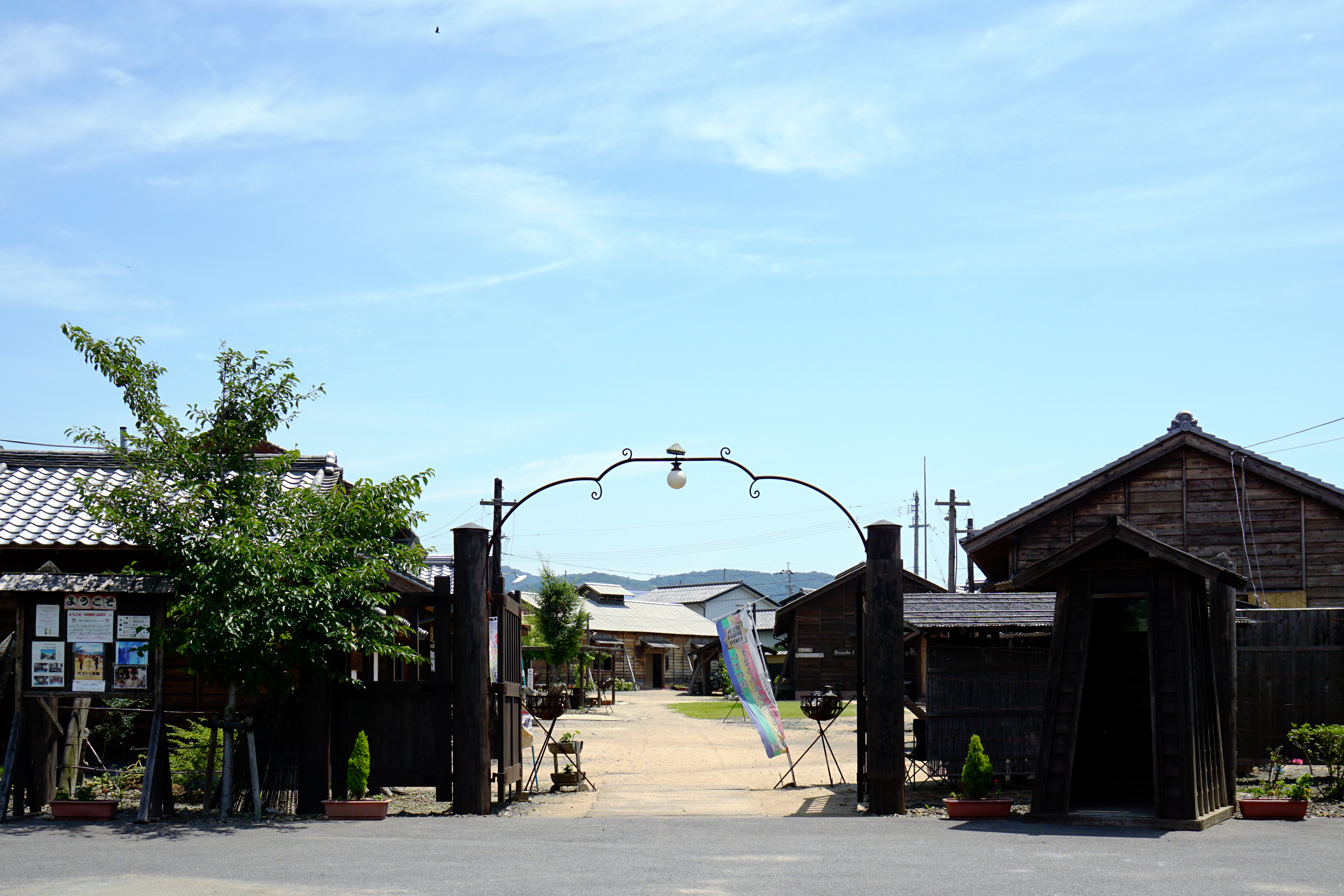
- The museum of the history of Bandō prisoner-of-war camp "Baruto-no-niwa"

- Bandō POW camp Bandō prisoner-of-war camp (Japan)
- Location: Naruto, Tokushima, Japan

Site notes
- Area: 37,079.20 m^{2} (399,117.2 sq ft)
- National Historic Site of Japan

The Bandō POW camp (板東俘虜収容所, Bandō Furyoshūyōsho) was a prisoner-of-war camp during World War I in the western suburbs of what is now Naruto, Tokushima Prefecture, on the island of Shikoku, Japan. From April 1917 until January 1920, just under a thousand of the 3,900 soldiers of the Imperial German Army, Imperial German Navy, German Marine Corps and Austro-Hungarian Navy who had been captured at the Siege of Tsingtao in November 1914 were imprisoned at the camp. When the camp closed in 1920, sixty-three of the prisoners chose to remain in Japan. The site of the camp was designated a National Historic Site in 2002.

== History ==
In 1914, none of the parties involved in the conflict expected it to last for long, so the German prisoners-of-war taken by the Imperial Japanese Army in China were initially temporarily housed in public buildings such as Buddhist temples, inns or army barracks. However, when it became apparent that the war would not end soon, twelve large camps were set up on the outskirts of twelve Japanese cities (between Tokyo and Kumamoto). The conditions in each camp differed considerably. In some prison camps, prisoners enjoyed relatively liberal and humane treatment, while physical abuse occurred in other places. The Japanese government was aware of international scrutiny of its treatment of Western prisoners and was anxious that nothing should arise to interfere with its quest to be recognized as a Great Power and an equal to the Western nations. The Bandō POW camp was formed in 1917 by merging three older facilities (at Marugame, Matsuyama and Tokushima) and became an exemplary facility which was highly praised by the International Red Cross and other foreign observers.

=== Camp ===
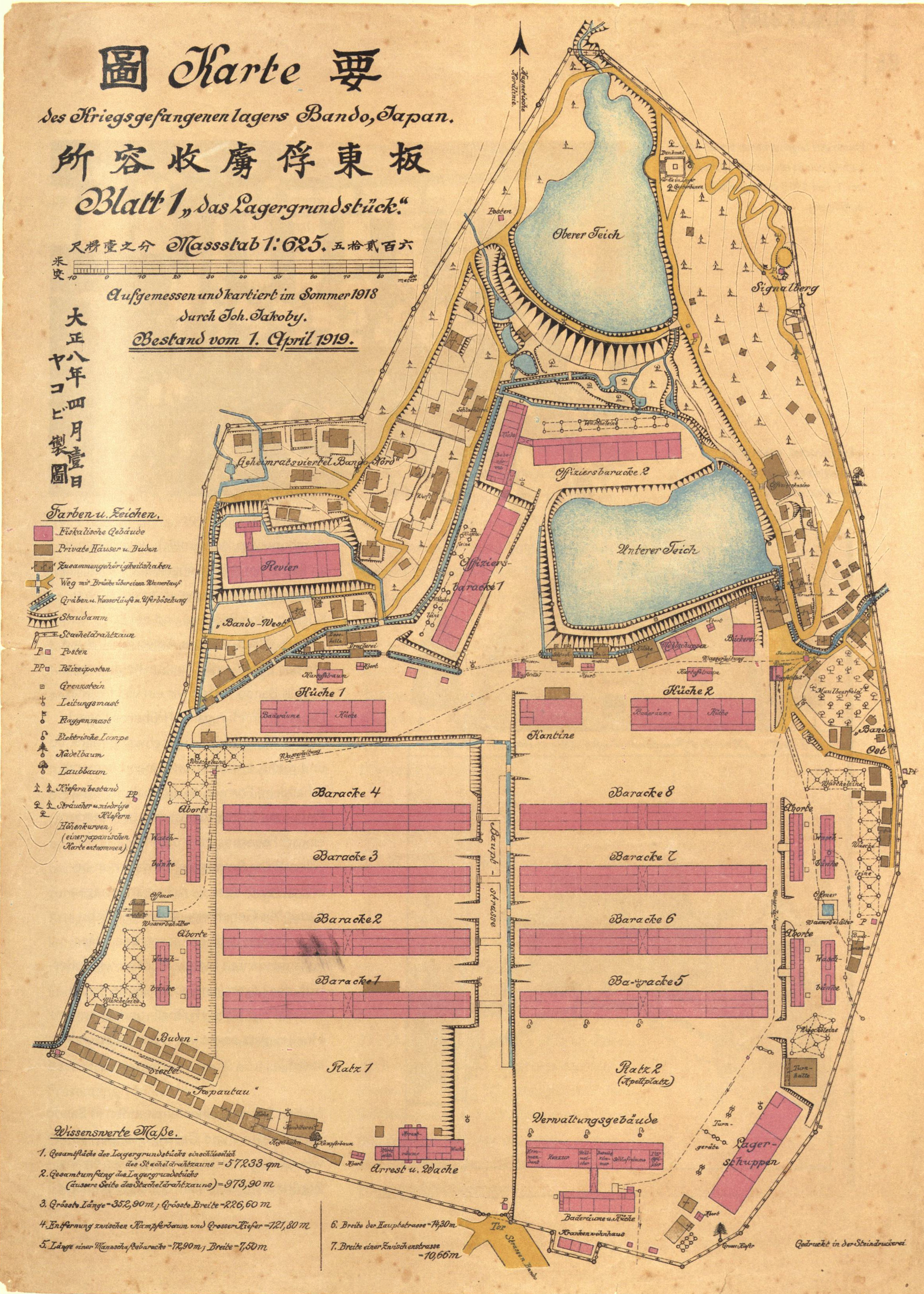
Plan of the camp in 1917

The total area of the camp was 57,233 square metres (14.143 acres). Enlisted soldiers were housed in eight barracks, arranged in two groups of four; the officers occupied two separate wooden quarters to the north. In the southwest quadrant of the camp was a "business district" with numerous shacks for use by prisoners as workshops; further booths were spread over the rest of the area. There were two factories and 54 facilities built by the Japanese Army, including bathrooms, kitchens, toilets, cleaning facilities, hospitals, and bakeries, as well as 127 facilities built by the prisoners themselves.

Lieutenant Colonel Matsue Toyohisa, the former head of the Tokushima camp was appointed camp commander at Bandō. He showed great tolerance for the needs of the prisoners and encouraged them to engage in productive activities. Under his direction, prisoners could lease land for sporting or agricultural purposes. Wooden stalls were set up as a market, where prisoners could sell handicrafts, food and beverages, and other products, transforming the camp into more of a small village than a prison. This was successful as a large number of the prisoners were not professional soldiers, but were reservists or volunteers from a wide variety of professional backgrounds (including bakers, cooks, butchers, carpenters, locksmiths, plumbers, shoemakers, tailors, painters, watchmakers, pharmacists, barbers, photographers, washermen, etc.) . This ensured a lively exchange among the inmates, who educated each other in courses (economy, geography, art, culture, fortifications, stenography, bookkeeping, language courses, electrical engineering, instrument making, etc.). Through this activity, many inmates acquired qualifications which were useful after the war. In the camp there was a printing shop, which printed programs of events, maps, postcards, lecture notes, entrance tickets, sheet music, advertising leaflets, technical drawings, books, and stamps for use in the camp. The most important publications included the "Daily Telegram Service Bandō" (daily information sheet) and the camp newspaper "Die Baracke" (published initially weekly, then monthly). This newspaper has been translated into English and is available online, together with the original handwritten German texts.

Most of the prisoners were released in December 1919 and January 1920. The majority returned to Germany, but some settled permanently in Japan. The camp was officially closed on February 8, 1920, after which the site was used as a training ground by the Imperial Japanese Army. After World War II, it was used to accommodate Japanese returnees from overseas.

=== Orchestra ===
The camp had a large number of music groups (the "Kiautschou Sailor Artillery Band", the "Tokushima Orchestra", the "Schulz Orchestra" and a mandolin band) and theater groups. The quality of the performances ranged from simple amateur pieces to professional performances and concerts. During its 32-month existence, over 100 concerts, lectures, as well as several dozen plays and entertainment programs were presented, including venues at nearby Ryōzen-ji. On 1 June 1918 the prisoners mounted the first performance of Beethoven's Ninth Symphony in the country. This event is the origin of the popularity of the symphony in Japan, performed numerous times at the end of each year, and is celebrated annually with a concert at the Naruto Bunka Kaikan on the first Sunday in June, indirectly leading to the length of audio compact discs being over 74 minutes.

== Preservation ==
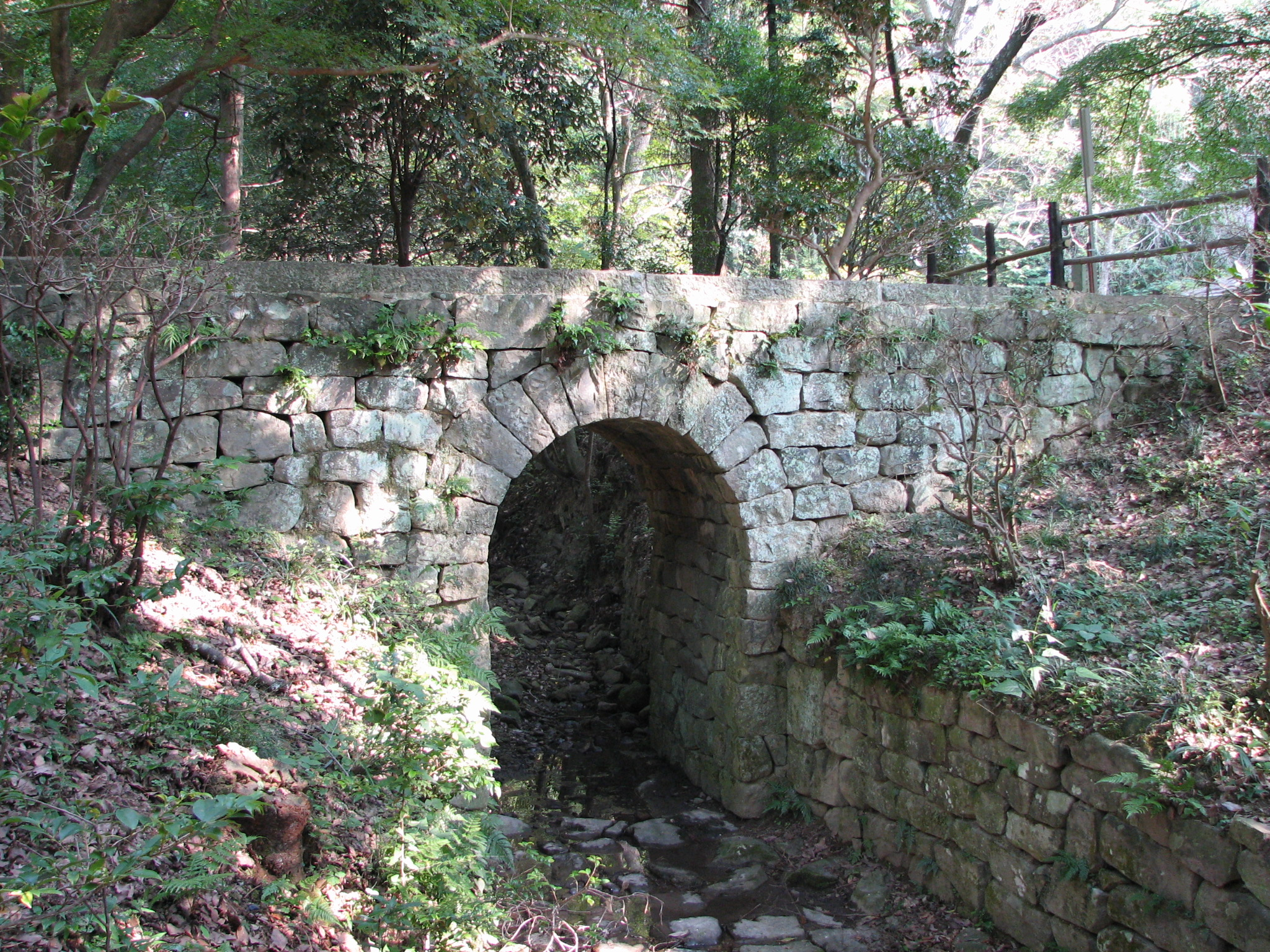
German Bridge, built by the prisoners of Bandō during their captivity

In 1972 the Naruto Doitsu-kan (鳴門市ドイツ館) was opened as a museum; two years later a sister city relationship between Naruto and Lüneburg (home of many of the prisoners) followed. In 1993, a larger new building - in the style of Lüneburg Town Hall - replaced the "German House Naruto" as a museum. On October 27, 2011, German President Christian Wulff visited the site.

In 2006, German-Japanese historical drama Ode to Joy (バルトの楽園, Baruto no gakuen), starring Bruno Ganz and Ken Matsudaira, which explores the cultural interactions between the prisoners and the Japanese, was released It was directed by Masanobu Deme.

Two of the original barracks buildings from the Bandō POW camp survive, but not in their original locations. The Akike Barracks (安藝家バラッケ, Akike Barakke) and the Kakimotoke Barracks (柿本家バラッケ, Kakimotoke Barakkke) are both Registered Tangible Cultural Properties

== See also ==
- German–Japanese relations
- Baruto no Gakuen
- List of Historic Sites of Japan (Tokushima)
