= Teiko Inahata =

Japanese haiku poet, essayist, and literary critic (1931–2022)

- 稲畑汀子
- Born: 8 January 1931; Yokohama, Kanagawa Prefecture, Japan
- Died: 27 February 2022 (aged 91); Ashiya, Hyōgo Prefecture, Japan
- Occupation: Poet

Inahata Teiko (Japanese: 稲畑汀子; 8 January 1931 – 27 February 2022) was a Japanese haiku poet, essayist and literary critic.

== Life and career ==
Born in Yokohama, the granddaughter of poet Kyoshi Takahama and the daughter of poet Toshio Takahama, Inahata had been composing haiku since she was still a child. She studied at Kobayashi Seishin Women's College.

Inahata published her first collection of haiku in 1976. In 1979 she succeeded her father as editor-in-chief of the literary magazine Hototogisu, and was editor of the newspaper The Asahi Shimbun. In 1987 she founded and was the first secretary of the Traditional Haiku Society, later serving as its honorary president. She was a Catholic.

Inahata died in Ashiya, Hyōgo Prefecture on 27 February 2022, at the age of 91.
