= Adam's Curse (poem) =

Poem by William Butler Yeats

"Adam's Curse" is a poem written by William Butler Yeats. In the poem, Yeats describes the difficulty of creating something beautiful. The title alludes to the Book of Genesis, evoking the fall of man and the separation of work and pleasure. Yeats originally included the poem in the volume In the Seven Woods, published in 1903.

== Biographical context ==
"Adam's Curse" was written just before the marriage of Maud Gonne and John MacBride. Yeats drew on a meeting with Maud Gonne and her sister Kathleen Pilcher.

== Structure ==
The poem is composed of three stanzas of heroic couplets (19 couplets total). Some of the rhymes are full (years/ears) and some are only partial (clergymen/thereupon). Ostensibly collaborating with one another, the first, second, and third stanzas are linked by an informal slant-rhyme scheme (e.g., "summer's end | clergymen | thereupon"; "trade enough | name of love"; "yet we'd grown | hollow moon").

A quasi-sonnet appears with the first stanza, which is perhaps an allusion/homage to the “precedents out of beautiful old books” and the formalism of the eras preceding Yeats. Of its 14 lines, the first 13 are unbroken, while the last is made up of three iambs. These, in turn, are fulfilled through enjambment, and bleed into the first line of the second stanza (i.e. "The martyrs call the world. | And thereupon").

The second stanza shares its first line with the last of the first stanza and maintains a similar form of non-repeating couplets. Its final line lies roughly coupled with the first line of the third stanza (i.e. the slant rhyme between "enough" and "love").

The third and final stanza differs from its predecessors in its length. Constructed from 11 lines (five heroic couplets), the third is significantly shorter than the others.

== Summary ==
Yeats serves as arbiter for his profession, condemning the view that beauty in art (and, subsequently, everywhere else) comes naturally. Rather, he supports the idea that beauty can only come about through great mental ardor. Pitting himself with the "martyrs", the poet speaks through a victim's perspective and provides evidence to support his claim. Yeats' poem, though at times mock-serious, makes a subtle plea for greater understanding of the creative process and those that make it their "trade".

== See also ==
- 1903 in poetry
