= On Baile's Strand =

Play written by W. B. Yeats

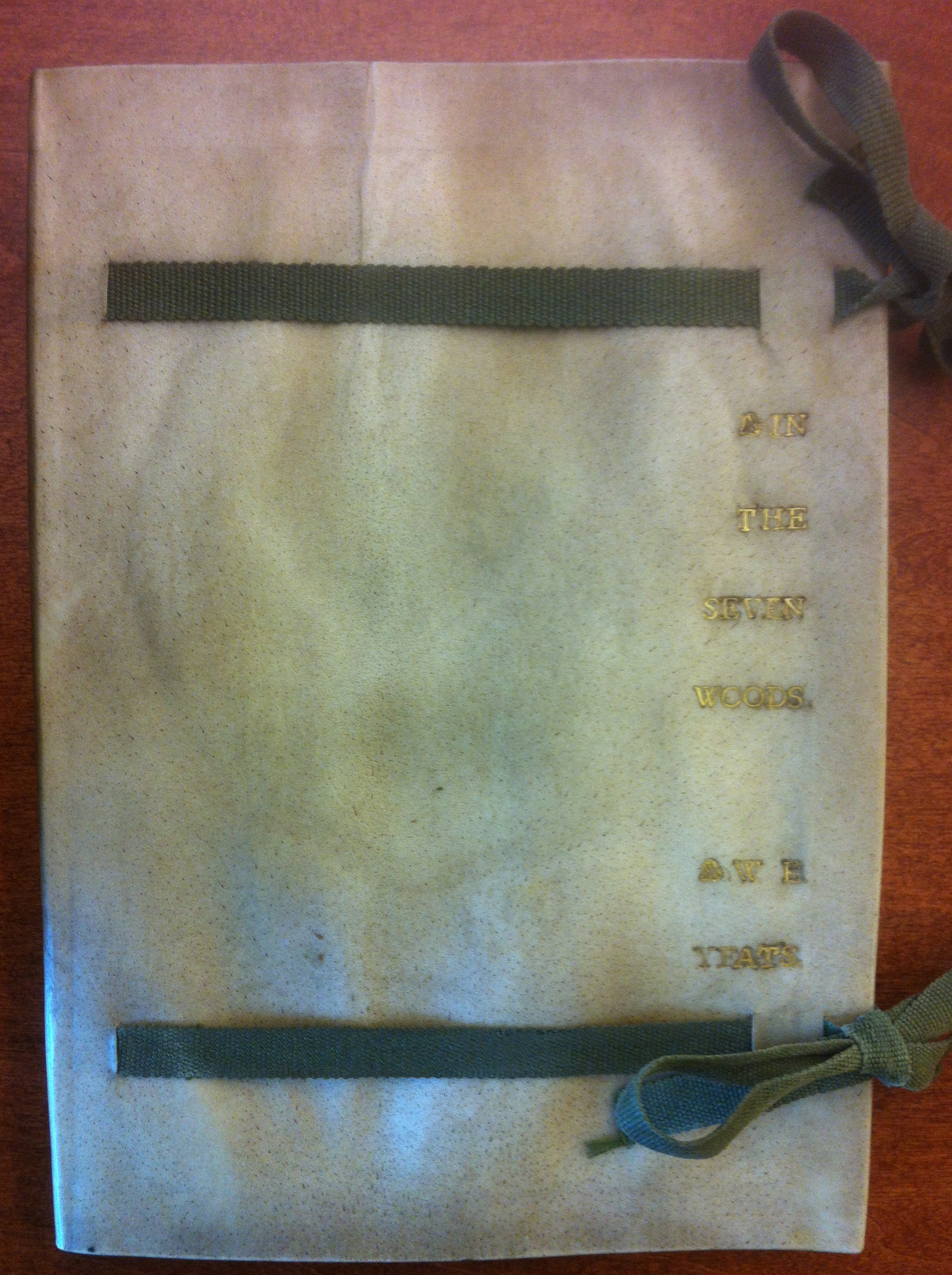
- On Baile's Strand was first published in the 1903 poetry volume In the Seven Woods (cover pictured)
- Written by: W. B. Yeats
- Characters: Cuchulain
- Original language: English
- Subject: Irish folklore

Premiere
- Date premiered: 27 December 1904
- Place premiered: Abbey Theatre

On Baile's Strand is a play written by W. B. Yeats and first printed in In the Seven Woods published by Dun Emer Press in 1903. The play was first performed at the grand opening of the Abbey Theatre on 27 December 1904. The play is based around the Irish mythological hero Cuchulain.

== History ==
The story is based on the early Irish folk story Aided Óenfhir Aífe, but with significant changes to the tale, including the addition of a comic subplot. The play received significant revision in 1905.

=== 1938 production ===
The play was performed again on 4 April 1938. W. B. Yeats's daughter Anne Yeats designed for this second production, taking responsibility for the setting and costumes. Anne Yeats was 19 when she produced the second performance of On Baile's Strand. Anne Yeats designed many character sketches in a number of notebooks she kept, which are held at the archives of the National Gallery of Ireland; these sketches include designs for Cuchulain, played by Liam Redmond.

Other characters include:

- A Blind Man (William O'Gorman)
- A Fool (Cyril Cusack)
- Conchubar (John Stephenson)
- A Young Man (Wilfrid Brambell)
- Young kings and Old Kings (Malachi Keegan, Denis O'Neill, J. Winter, F. Webster, Frank Carney, Patrick H. Considine)
- Three Women (Ann Clery, Gertrude Quinn, Kathleen O'Byrne)
- Servant (Peggy Cummins)
