= Long Journey into Love =

1973 film

- Film poster
- Directed by: Masanobu Deme
- Screenplay by: Zenzo Matsuyama; Noriyoshi Masuda
- Story by: Yuzo Kitaizumi
- Produced by: Masayuki Sato; Kazuo Baba; Kideyuki Shiino
- Starring: Komaki Kurihara; Go Kato; Kyoko Maya
- Cinematography: Kazutani Hara
- Music by: Masaru Sato
- Production companies: Toho; Haiyu-za Film
- Distributed by: Toho
- Release date: 7 July 1973 (Japan)
- Running time: 167 minutes
- Country: Japan
- Language: Japanese

Long Journey into Love (Japanese: 忍ぶ糸, Hepburn: Shinobu-ito) is a 1973 Japanese drama film directed by Masanobu Deme. It received a theatrical release in Japan on 7 July 1973, where it was distributed by Toho. The film received the award for Best Art Direction (Shinobu Muraki) at the Mainichi Film Concours.

== Cast ==
- Komaki Kurihara as Chika
- Go Kato as Yozo
- Kyoko Maya
- Misako Watanabe
- Choichiro Kawarazaki
- Eitaro Ozawa

== See also ==
- List of Japanese films of 1973

== Sources ==
- Galbraith IV, Stuart (2008). The Toho Studios Story: A History and Complete Filmography. Scarecrow Press. ISBN 978-1461673743.
