= Baruto no Gakuen =

- DVD cover
- Directed by: Masanobu Deme
- Produced by: Noriko Koyanagi
- Starring: Ken Matsudaira; Jun Kunimura; Hiroshi Abe; Bruno Ganz; Oliver Bootz; Kostja Ullmann
- Edited by: Motomu Furuta
- Music by: Shin-ichiro Ikebe
- Distributed by: Toei Company
- Release date: June 17, 2006 (Japan)
- Running time: 134 minutes
- Countries: Japan; Germany
- Languages: Japanese; German

Baruto no Gakuen (Japanese: バルトの楽園), also known as Ode to Joy, is a 2006 Japanese film directed by Masanobu Deme and starring Bruno Ganz and Ken Matsudaira. It is based on the true story of the Bandō prisoner-of-war camp in World War I and depicts the friendship of the German POWs with the director of the camp and local residents of Naruto, Tokushima Prefecture in Japan.

The film, which explores the cultural interactions between the prisoners and the Japanese, is also called "The Bearded Orchestra". This title was derived from the Bandō camp's commandant, Toyohisa Matsue, who was noted for his "imposing" Wilhelmine beard.

== See also ==
- Germany–Japan relations
