= Makoto Shinohara =

Japanese composer (1931–2024)

Makoto Shinohara (篠原 眞, Shinohara Makoto; December 10, 1931 – March 3, 2024) was a Japanese composer.

== Biography ==
Born in Osaka, Japan, Shinohara studied at the Tokyo University of the Arts from 1952 to 1954, studying composition with Tomojirō Ikenouchi, piano with Kazuko Yasukawa, and conducting with Akeo Watanabe and Kurt Wöss. From 1954 to 1960, he studied in Paris with Tony Aubin, Olivier Messiaen, Simone Plé-Caussade, Pierre Revel and Louis Fourestier. From 1962 to 1964 he studied at the Hochschule für Musik München and at the Siemens-Studio für elektronische Musik; following this he studied with Bernd Alois Zimmermann and Gottfried Michael Koenig at the Rheinische Musikschule in Cologne and then with Karlheinz Stockhausen from 1964 to 1965. He held a scholarship from the German Academic Exchange Service in 1966 and 1967 and won a scholarship from the Italian government in 1969. In 1971, he was awarded the Rockefeller Prize from the Columbia Princeton Electronic Music Center and in 1978 won a scholarship from the Dutch government.

Shinohara worked with electronic music at the Institute of Sonology in Utrecht, at the electronic studio at the Technische Universität Berlin, at the Columbia Princeton Electronic Music Center in New York (1971–72) and at Studio NHK (Nippon Hōsō Kyōkai) in Tokyo. In 1978 Shinohara was a visiting professor of composition at McGill University in Montreal, Canada.

From the 1970s onwards, he was best known for combining Western and traditional Japanese music, as well as versatile experimentation with Western acoustic and electronic music.

Shinohara died of stomach cancer on 3 March 2024, at the age of 92.

== Works ==
=== Orchestral ===
- 1975 Egalisation for 24 instruments (piccolo, flute, alto flute, oboe, English horn, clarinet, bass clarinet, trumpet, trombone, tuba, piano, celesta, cembalo, harp, guitar, vibraphone, marimba, percussion, violin, viola, cello, and double bass)
- 1970 Visions for 3 flutes, 4 oboes, 4 clarinets, 4 bassoons, 4 horns, 4 trumpets, 4 trombones, 6 percussion, harp, celesta, 24 violins, 8 violas, 8 cellos, 4 double basses
- 1975 Visions II
- c1977 Liberation for 20 string instruments
- 1992 Yumeji (Ways of Dreams) for an orchestra of Japanese and Western instruments and mixed choir
- Solitude pour orchestra

=== Wind orchestra ===
- 1982/1985 Play for Nine Wind Instruments (flute, alto flute, oboe, clarinet, bass clarinet, bassoon, horn, trumpet, and trombone)

=== Chamber music ===
- 1958 Sonata for violin and piano
  1. Allegro moderato
  2. Lento
  3. Allegro brutale
- 1960 Obsession for oboe and piano
- c1960 Kassouga for flute and piano
- 1968 Fragmente for tenor recorder
- 1970 Reflexion for solo oboe
- 1983/1993 Turns for violin and koto
- 1984 Tabiyuki (On travel) for mezzo-soprano and small ensemble (flute, oboe, clarinet, bassoon, horn, trumpet, trombone, percussion, violin, viola, cello and double bass)
- 1986/1990 Evolution for solo cello
- 1990 Cooperation for 8 traditional Japanese and 8 Western instruments (English horn, clarinet, trumpet, trombone, percussion, piano, violin, and cello)
- 1993 Situations for alto saxophone and digital keyboard
- 2005 Turns for violin and koto
- Consonance for flute, horn, vibraphone, marimba, harp and cello
- Relations for flute and piano

=== Percussion ensemble ===
- 1962 Alternance

=== Keyboard ===
- Elevation for organ
- 1963/1969 Tendence pour piano
- 1996 Undulation A for piano
- The Bear who saw the Sea for two pianos

=== Music for traditional Japanese instruments ===
- 1972 Tatuyai (Fluctuation) for koto, percussion, and singer
- 1972 Tuyatai (Fluctuation) for sangen
- 1973 Kyudo A (In quest of enlightenment) for shakuhachi
- 1973 Kyudo B for shakuhachi and harp
- 1981 Jushichigen-no-Umare (Birth of the bass koto) for 17-Gen
- 1981 Nagare for Shamisen for shamisen, sangen, kin and gongs

=== Electronic music ===
- 1966 Memoires 4-channel electronic composition composed at the Institute of Sonology in Utrecht
- 1974 Broadcasting
- 1979 City Visit for 4-channel tape
- 1980 Passage for bass flute and stereophony
- To Rain and Wind for koto, percussion and live electronics
- Personnage
