= Murakami Kijo =

Japanese poet and writer

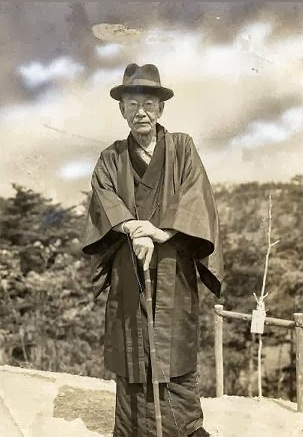
Kijo in later life. Murakami Kijo memorial day is September 17.

Murakami Kijo (村上 鬼城, Murakami Kijō; 1865–1938) was a Japanese poet who wrote haiku.

== Biography ==
Kijo was born in 1865 in Edo, Japan. He studied law but gave this up after losing his hearing due to illness. In 1894, he worked as a legal scribe in Takasaki. He helped publish the first edition of Hototogisu, a haiku magazine. He published his collection of work in 1917. In 1927, his house burned down with everything that he owned. Kijo died on September 17, 1938.

=== Poems ===
First autumn morning
the mirror I stare into
shows my father's face.

The moment two bubbles
are united, they both vanish.
A lotus blooms.
