= Tomojirō Ikenouchi =

Japanese composer and teacher (1906–1991)

- Born: October 21, 1906; Tokyo, Empire of Japan
- Died: March 9, 1991 (aged 84); Tokyo, Japan
- Other name: 池内 友次郎
- Occupation: Composer
- Father: Kyoshi Takahama
- Family: Kristina Reiko Cooper (granddaughter)

Tomojirō Ikenouchi (池内 友次郎, Ikenouchi Tomojirō; October 21, 1906 – March 9, 1991) was a Japanese composer of contemporary classical music and professor.

== Biography ==
Tomojiro Ikenouchi was born in Tokyo as son of a haiku poet Kyoshi Takahama. He traveled to Paris in 1927, where he studied composition with Henri Büsser and piano with Lazare Lévy. His music is influenced by French Impressionist music. He returned to Japan in 1933.

Ikenouchi taught at the Tokyo National University of Fine Arts and Music beginning in 1947. His notable students include Isang Yun, Toshi Ichiyanagi, Toshiro Mayuzumi, Maki Ishii, Shin-ichiro Ikebe, Makoto Shinohara, Akira Miyoshi, Akio Yashiro, Roh Ogura, Kōhei Tanaka, Teizo Matsumura, Sei Ikeno, Masato Uchida and Ryohei Hirose. See: List of music students by teacher: G to J#Tomojirō Ikenouchi. Along with several of his students, he formed the Shinshin Kai group in 1955.

His works are published by Ongaku-no-Tomo Sha. His granddaughter is cellist, Kristina Reiko Cooper.
