= Ryōhei Hirose =

Japanese composer

- Born: July 17, 1930; Hakodate, Hokkaido, Japan
- Died: November 24, 2008 (aged 78); Kyoto, Japan
- Other name: 廣瀬 量平
- Occupation: composer
- Website: Ryouhei Hirose official website

Ryōhei Hirose (廣瀬 量平, Hirose Ryōhei; July 17, 1930 in Hakodate, Hokkaidō, Japan – November 24, 2008 in Kyoto; given name also spelled Ryouhei) was a Japanese composer.

== Biography ==
He studied at the Tokyo National University of Fine Arts and Music, with Tomojirō Ikenouchi and Akio Yashiro. He served as a professor in the music department of the Kyoto City University of Arts from 1977 to 1996, afterwards filling various administrative posts there. He has also served as lecturer at the Mozarteum University of Salzburg (1997), Essen Music University (2003), the Kunitachi College of Music (1977–79), and the Tokyo National University of Fine Arts and Music (1991–1998).

He has composed for both Japanese and Western instruments, but is best known for his compositions for shakuhachi and recorder. He has also composed for viola da gamba.

Hirose's recorder music has been widely recorded. See Recorded Recorders for a comprehensive discography.

Hirose died on November 24, 2008.

== Compositions ==
- Triste (cello concerto) (1971)
- Festival Overture (orchestra) (1971)
- Concerto for Shakuhachi and Orchestra (1976)
- Blue Train (flute orchestra) (1979)
- Sonata for Flute and Harpsichord (1964)
- Hare for 3 shakuhachi (1969)
- Aki 2 Shakuhachi (1969, arr. for Rec 1988)
- Composition for Percussions, Viola and Violoncello (1970)
- Potalaka Rec(A), Vc, Hp (1972)
- Padma for oboe solo (1973)
- Pāramitā for alto-flute solo with accompaniment of organ-point (1973)
- Kakurin for shakuhachi solo (1973)
- Karavinka Rec, Ob, Vn, Va, Vc, Perc (1973)
- Mitsu no mai Rec, Guit (1974)
- Mitsu no uta Rec, Perc, Koto (1974)
- Lamentation Rec-ens(A, A, T, B) (1975)
- Meditation Rec(A or T) (1975)
- Idyll 1 Rec-ens.(Sn.A.T.B.) (1976)
- Tenral-Cbikyo 4 Rec, 4 Perc, Shaku, etc. (1976)
- Topography 2 Rec, Perc, etc. (1976)
- Kama Rec-pl(Sn-B), Va da Gamba, Cem, etc. (196?, arr. for Rec 1978)
- Hymn Rec(A) / 1979 (arr. for Fl (1982)
- Ode I 2 Rec-pl(A-B, 'r-B) (1979)
- Ode II Rec-pl(A-B, A-T-B) (1980)
- Aubade 2 Rec.(A.T-S.Sn-A.T-S.T-A.A) (1989)
- Suite for noble cats 5 Vdg (1990, arr. Rec-ens(S, A, T, B, CB) 1991)
- Dirge of Troja 2 Rec-pl(2B) (1995)
- Lamenta of Inca Rec(B) (1995)
- Illusion of the Crescent 1 Rec(T) (2005)
