= Kristina Reiko Cooper =

American cellist

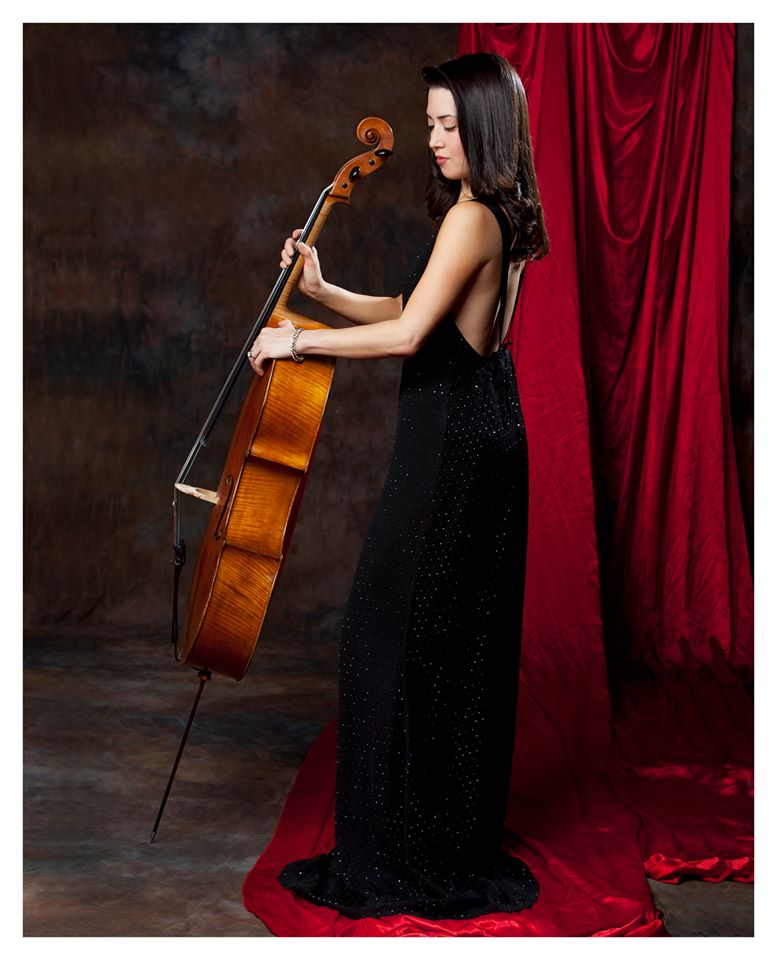
- Cellist Kristina Reiko Cooper.

Background information
- Born: New York City, New York, U.S.
- Genres: Classical music
- Occupation: Musician
- Instrument: Cello
- Website: kristinareikocooper.com

Kristina Reiko Cooper is an American cellist known for her work as a recitalist, chamber musician, soloist with orchestra, recording artist, and educator. She has performed internationally with a wide range of orchestras and ensembles, and she has performed and commissioned contemporary works from composers such as Lera Auerbach, Josef Bardanashvili, Kenji Bunch, Mario Davidovsky, Avner Dorman, Tan Dun, Philip Glass, Tania León, Roberto Sierra, and Benjamin Yusupov. She is Co-Director with Joel Sachs of the contemporary music ensemble Continuum, based in New York City.

== Biography ==
Ms. Cooper’s newest recording, Hidden Legacies - Weinberg & Korngold, featuring conductor Constantine Orbelian and the Kaunas City Symphony Orchestra, was released on the Delos label in March 2026. The recording was reviewed in the BBC Music Magazine, Gramophone, Diapason, Classical Music Sentinel, Online Merker, Textura, Cinemusical, Pizzicato, and Infodad.

In conjunction with the release of this album, a documentary film, Emerging from the Shadows: Rediscovering the legacies of Weinberg and Korngold, which follows Ms. Cooper and Maestro Orbelian as they record the repertoire for the album, received its screening in New York City at the Directors Guild of America’s New York Theater on April 15, 2026. As of today, this film has been shown in multiple festivals and has won multiple awards.

Ms. Cooper created a consortium of Yad Vashem, the World Holocaust Remembrance Center in Jerusalem, and the American Society of Yad Vashem to commission composer Lera Auerbach to write her Symphony No. 6 “Vessels of Light.” Scored for cello, chorus, and orchestra, the work commemorates Chiune Sugihara, a Japanese diplomat who helped thousands of Jews flee from Europe by issuing travel visas to them so that they could travel through the Japanese territory, risking his career and the lives of his family. As a result, generations of visa recipient families are alive today, including Ms. Cooper’s husband and three children.

“Vessels of Light” received its world premiere in Kaunas, Lithuania, in November 2022, with Ms. Cooper performing as soloist with the Kaunas City Symphony Orchestra and Kaunas State Choir under the leadership of conductor Constantine Orbelian. The work has since been performed by ensembles including the New York City Opera Orchestra and Chorus at Carnegie Hall, conducted by Constantine Orbelian; the Prague Radio Symphony Orchestra led by Alexander Liebrich; UCLA Philharmonia and Chamber Singers conducted by Neal Stulberg; Festival Napa Valley with the Festival Orchestra Napa as well as the Mexico City Philharmonic under Constantine Orbelian; the Dresden Philharmonie led by François Leleux, the Leipzig Gewandhaus Orchestra conducted by Alan Gilbert, and, in Berlin, by the Konzerthaus Orchester led by Joana Mallwitz.

She has appeared as a soloist with orchestras including the Jerusalem Symphony Orchestra, Israel Sinfonietta Beersheba, Boston Modern Orchestra Project, Kinnor Philharmonic, Mexico City Philharmonic, Toronto Symphony Orchestra, and ARTE TV. In 2025, she premiered Uri Brener’s Halls of Memory, a concerto for cello and orchestra, with the Jerusalem Symphony Orchestra in commemoration of fallen Israeli soldiers.

Ms. Cooper has performed at international venues such as Carnegie Hall, the Kennedy Center, Suntory Hall in Tokyo, the Henry Crown Theater in Jerusalem, and with such orchestras as the Leipzig Gewandhausorchester, the Dresden Philharmonic, the Toronto Symphony, the Prague Radio Symphony Orchestra, Prague Chamber Orchestra, the Israel Chamber Orchestra, the Osaka Symphony, the Tokyo Yomiuri Nippon Symphony Orchestra, and the Shanghai Symphony.

As a chamber musician, she was a founding member of the Whitman Quartet, Quartetto Gelato, Opus X, and Intersection, and was a recipient of the Walter M. Naumburg Chamber Music Award. Her festival appearances include Lincoln Center Festival, Mostly Mozart, Musicians from Marlboro, Bang on a Can, and the Stresa International Music Festival.

Ms. Cooper was born and raised in New York City into a family of musicians. Her father, Rex Cooper, is a pianist and former professor at the University of the Pacific, and her mother, Mutsuko Tatman, is a violinist who served as concertmaster of the American Symphony Orchestra. Her grandfather, Tomojiro Ikenouchi, was a Japanese composer, and her great-grandfather, Takahama Kyoshi, was a haiku poet. Ms. Cooper holds bachelor’s, master’s, and doctoral degrees from The Juilliard School, where she studied with Joel Krosnick.

A founding musical director of the Israel Chamber Music Society, she serves as Vice President of the America-Israel Cultural Foundation and as a board member of the Charney Forum for New Diplomacy. Ms. Cooper, a visiting professor at the Buchmann-Mehta School of Music at Tel Aviv University, performs on a 1743 Guadagnini cello, known as the "Ex-Havermeyer," and resides in Tel Aviv with her family.

Ms. Cooper is a published author as a contributing essayist in the book My Jerusalem published by the Gefen Publishing House.

Ms. Cooper converted to Judaism and currently spends her time between New York and Tel Aviv with her husband, Leonard Rosen, an investment banker, whom she married in 2006. They have three children.

== Discography ==
=== Solo works ===
- Around the World with Love (2016)
- Joy and Sorrow (2015)
- Stone and Steel (2008)

=== As Kristina & Laura ===
- Salut D'Amour (2004)
- Force of Sound (2003)
- Passion (2002)
- Amorosso (2001)
- Gardens (2000)
- Intersection (1999)
- Sweet Times (1998)
- Manhattan Breeze (1997)

=== Guest appearances ===
- Hidden Legacies Weinberg & Korngold (2026)
- Omaramor (2015)
- The Classical Hour at Steinway Hall (2005)
- Travels the Orient Express (With Quartetto Gelato) [2004]
- Artur Schnabel: String Quartet (1998)
- Roccoco Variations
