= Takako Hashimoto =

Japanese haiku poet (1899–1963)

Takako Hashimoto (橋本多佳子; born Tama Yamatani; 15 January 1899 - 29 May 1963) was a Japanese haiku writer.

Hashimoto studied painting at the Kikusaka Women's School of Art (now part of Joshibi University of Art and Design), but did not graduate due to poor health. In 1917, she married the architect Hashimoto Toyojirō (died 1937), with whom she had four daughters.

Hashimoto began studying haiku under Hisajo Sugita, and later under the influence of Kyoshi Takahama. She was also a disciple of Yamaguchi Seishi, and was sometimes referred to as 'the female Seishi'. Together, they left the Hototogisu group founded by Takahama.

The couple lived in Kokura until Toyojiro's death, where Sugita had also settled. The location of the Hashimoto home where Takako held haiku salons with Sugita, has been turned into a park in what is now the north Kokura ward of Kitakyushu.

Hashimoto moved to a rural part of Nara Prefecture in 1944 and devoted herself to composing haiku.

Hashimoto founded the magazine Shichiyō (七曜, Seven Days) in 1948.

She died of liver cancer in 1963. A complete collection of her haiku was published in 1973.
