= Sado Okesa =

Sado Okesa (in Japanese: 佐渡おけさ) is a Japanese folk song that originated in Sado Island, Niigata Prefecture.

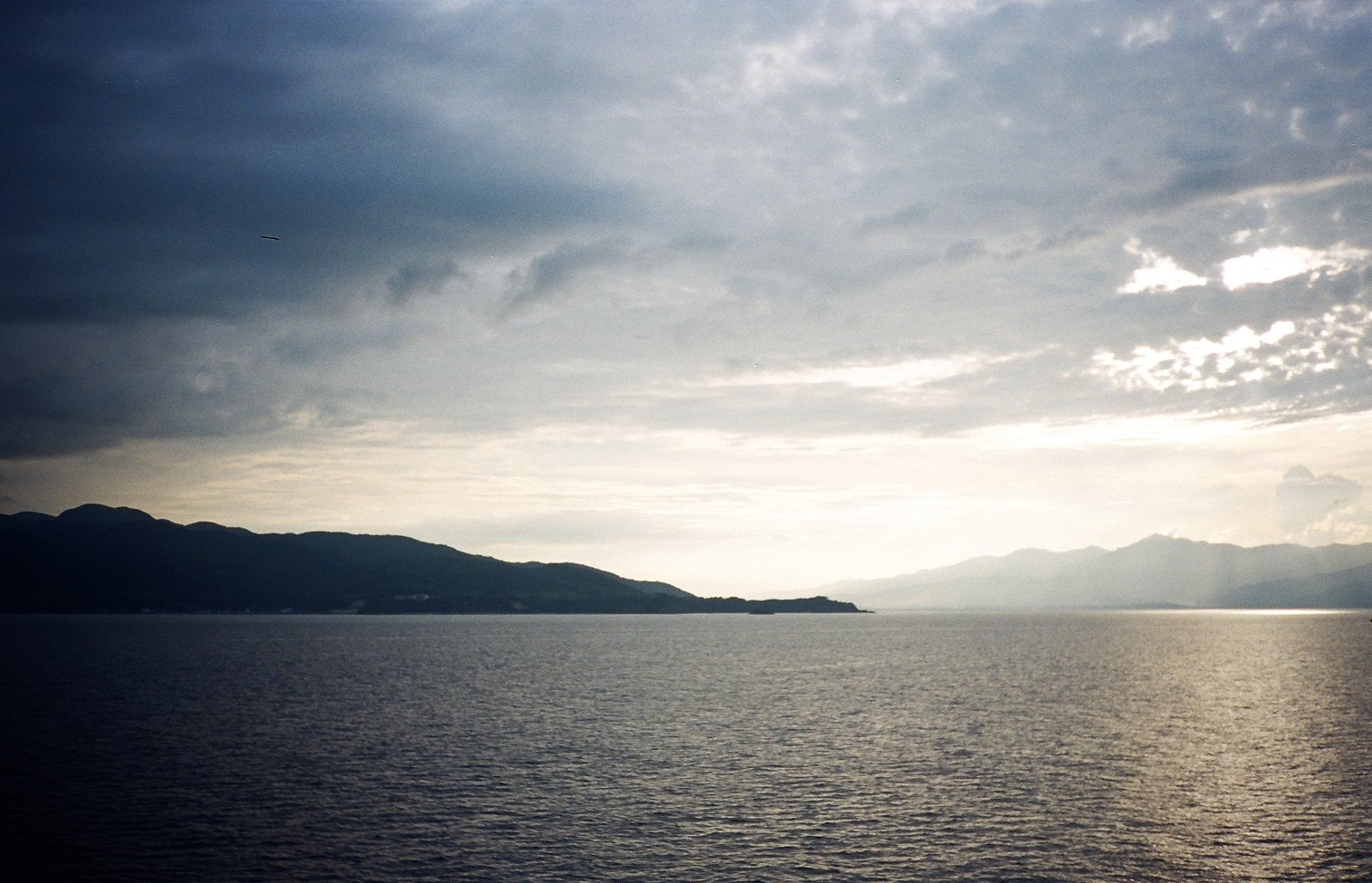
Sado Island

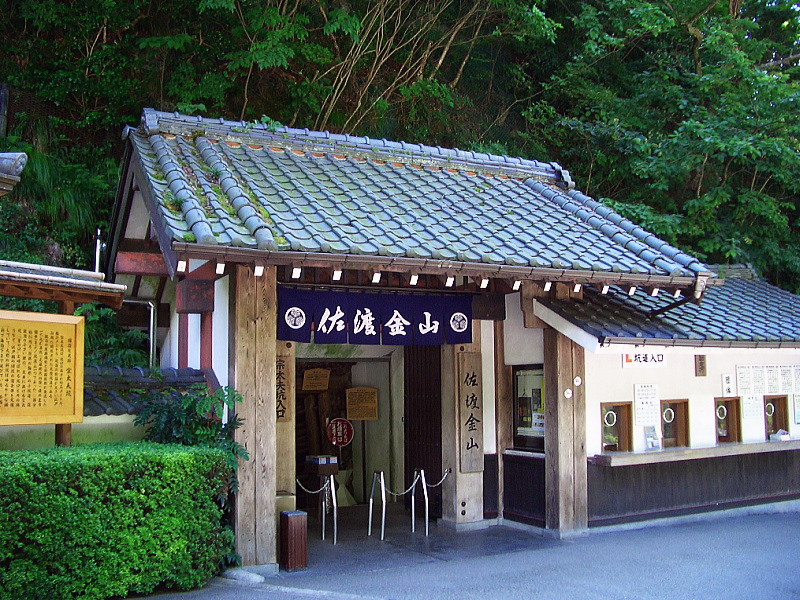
Entrance to Sado Gold Mines, now closed and a tourist attraction

== General ==
"Okesa' or "Okesabushi" is a style of the Japanese folk songs that is said to have originated in Amakusa City, Kumamoto Prefecture. They typically describe the dialog between a man and a woman in love, and were sung there when the seamen drank sake together. These songs were brought to Sado Island by these seamen who worked on the Japan Sea route of sea transportation.

Sado Okesa was sung in various versions in a few villages of Sado Island. During the latter half of the Meiji period, it already was a favorite song of those who worked in the famous gold mines of Aikawa on Sado Island.

This song became nationally famous in 1921 when it was broadcast in All Japan Folk Song Festival. It is now also a favorite Obon festival dance music for the people in Niigata Prefecture and its neighboring prefectures.

== Lyrics ==
One of the various versions of the lyrics goes:

- In Japanese
  1. 佐渡へ（アリャサ）、佐渡へ～（アリャアリャアリャサ） 佐渡へと草木もなびくよ。（アリャアリャアリャサ） 佐渡は居良いか、住み良いか。（アリャアリャアリャサ）
  2. 来いと（アリャサ）、来いと～（アリャアリャアリャサ）、来いと言うたとて、行かりょか佐渡へ。（アリャアリャアリャサ） 佐渡は四十九里、波の上～。（アリャアリャアリャサ）
  3. 佐渡と（アリャサ）、佐渡と～（アリャアリャアリャサ）、佐渡と出雲崎ャ棹さしゃ届くよ。 （アリャアリャアリャサ）、なぜに届かぬ、わが想い（アリャアリャアリャサ）
  4. ．．．
- In Romanized Japanese
  1. Sado e (Arya-sa!), Sado e-e (Arya-arya-arya-sa!), Sado e to kusaki mo nabiku yo! (Arya-arya-arya-sa!) Sado wa iyoi ka, (Arya-arya-arya-sa!), sumi yoi ka? (Arya-arya-arya-sa!)
  2. Koi to (Arya-sa), koi to-o (Arya-arya-arya-sa!), koi to iu ta tote, yukaaryo ka Sado e! (Arya-arya-arya-sa!) Sado wa shijuku ri, nami no ue. (Arya-arya-arya-sa!)
  3. Sado to-o (Arya-sa), Sado to-o (Arya-arya-arya-sa!), Sado to Izumozak(i)-ya sao sasha todoku yo! (Arya-arya-arya-sa!) Naze ni todokanu, waga omoi? (Arya-arya-arya-sa!)
  4. ...
- Translated into English
  1. Toward Sado, toward Sado, even the tree leaves and grasses are blown by the wind. Is Sado such a nice place to live?
  2. To come, to come you tell me, but I cannot go there easily. Sado is away from here 49 ri, over the sea waves.
  3. From Sado, from Sado, I can reach Izumozaki on the mainland by rowing a boat. But why and why cannot I reach your tender heart?
  4. ...

== See also ==
- Sado Island
- Japanese folk music
