= Akira Miyoshi =

Japanese composer

- Born: January 10, 1933; Tokyo, Japan
- Died: October 4, 2013 (aged 80); Tokyo, Japan
- Other name: 三善 晃
- Occupation: composer

Akira Miyoshi (三善 晃; January 10, 1933 – 4 October 2013) was a Japanese composer.

== Biography ==
Miyoshi was born in Suginami, Tokyo. He was a child prodigy on the piano, studying with Kozaburo Hirai and Tomojiro Ikenouchi. He studied French literature at the University of Tokyo, and then studied composition with Henri Challan and Raymond Gallois-Montbrun at the Paris Conservatory from 1955 to 1957. He was very influenced by Henri Dutilleux. He returned to Japan in 1957 and graduated from the University of Tokyo in 1960. In 1965, he became a professor at the Toho Gakuen School of Music. In 1996, Miyoshi was awarded the Officier de l’Ordre des Arts et des Lettres from the French Government. In 1999, he received the 31st Suntory Music Award. He received the Otaka prize six times for his compositions.

== Works ==
=== Orchestral ===
- 1960 Trois mouvements symphoniques – (Kôkyô sanshô)
- 1962 Concerto for piano and orchestra
- 1964 Duel for soprano and orchestra
- 1964 Concerto for Orchestra
- 1965 Concerto for violin and orchestra
- 1969 Concerto for marimba and string ensemble
- 1969 Odes métamorphosées
- 1970 Festival Overture
- 1970 Requiem for mixed choir and orchestra
- 1974 Concerto for cello and orchestra
- 1978 Noesis
- 1979 Psaume for mixed choir and orchestra
- 1982 En-Soi Lointain
- 1984 Kyômon for children's choir and orchestra
- 1988 Litania pour Fuji
- 1991 Création sonore
- 1991 Etoiles à cordes
- 1995 Dispersion de l'été
- 1996 Étoile à échos for cello and orchestra
- 1997 Fruits de brume
- 1998 Chanson terminale: Effeuillage des Vagues

=== Works for wind orchestra ===
- 1972 Sapporo Olympic Fanfare
- 1987 Subliminal Festa – (Secret Rites)
- 1990 Stars Atlanpic '96
- 1991 Cross-By March
- 2000 Millennium Fanfare
- 2002 West Wind (timpani concerto)

=== Chamber music ===
- 1954 Violin Sonata
- 1955 Sonata for flute, cello and piano
- 1962 String Quartet No. 1
- 1967 String Quartet No. 2
- 1969 Huit poèmes for flute octet
- 1973 Nocturne for flute, clarinet, marimba, double bass and percussion
- 1975 Litania for double bass and percussion
- 1979 Hommage for flute, violin and piano
- 1980 Ixtacchihuatl for percussion ensemble
- 1982 Rêve colorie for two clarinets
- 1985 Message Sonore for flute, clarinet, marimba, double bass and percussion
- 1987 C6H for cello
- 1989 Ombre Scintillante for flute and harp
- 1989 Perspective en Spirale for clarinet and piano
- 1990 5 Esquisses for tuba and marimba
- 1992 String Quartet No. 3: Constellation Noire

=== Music for piano ===
- 1958 Piano Sonata
- 1960 Suite In Such Time
- 1973 Chaînes Prelude for piano
- 1980 En vers for piano
- 1981 A Diary of the Sea (28 pieces)
- 1984 Phenomene sonore I for two pianos
- 1985 Cahier sonore for four-hand piano
- 1995 Phenomene sonore II for two pianos
- 1998 Pour le piano – mouvement circulaire et croisé

=== Music for guitar ===
- 1974 Protase "de loin à rien" for two guitars
- 1975 Epitase
- 1985 5 Poèmes
- 1989 Constellation Noire for guitar and string quartet

=== Music for percussion ===
- 1962 Conversation – Suite for marimba
  1. Tender Talk
  2. So Nice It Was...Repeatedly
  3. Lingering Chagrin
  4. Again The Hazy Answer!
  5. A Lame Excuse
- 1965 Torse III for marimba
  1. These
  2. Chant
  3. Commentaire
  4. Synthese
- 1977 Étude Concertante for 2 marimbas
- 1987 Rin-sai for marimba solo and six percussion players
- 1991 Ripple for marimba solo
- 2001 Prelude Etudes for marimba

=== Music for traditional Japanese instruments ===
- 1972 Torse IV for shakuhachi, 2 koto, 17-gen and string quartet
- 1986 Ryusho Kyoku Suifu for shakuhachi, 2 koto und 17-gen
- 1994 Gikyoku for Japanese instruments

=== Songs ===
- 1962 En blanc for soprano and piano
- 1962 Sei sanryoh hari for soprano and piano
- 1991 Koeru Kage ni for soprano and piano

=== Choral music ===
- 1962 Three Lyrics (Mittsu no Jojoh) for women's choir and piano
- 1962 To my married Daughter for mixed choir
- 1966 Four Seasons for mixed choir
- 1968 Five Pictures for Children for mixed choir and piano
  1. The weathercock
  2. The trumpet-shell
  3. "Yajiro-be" – A balancing toy
  4. The sand-glass
  5. A top of acorn
- 1970 Ohson fuki (Ohson didn't come back) for men's choir and piano
- 1971 Four Autumn Songs for women's choir and piano
- 1972 Odeko no koitsu for children's choir and piano
- 1973 5 Japanese Folksongs for mixed choir
  1. Awa odori
  2. Sado Okesa
  3. Kiso bushi
  4. Soran bushi
  5. Itsuki no komoriuta
- 1973 Otewanmiso no uta for mixed choir
- 1975 Hengetan'ei for mixed choir, shakuhachi, percussion instrument and 17-gen
- 1976 Kitsune-no-uta (Song of Fox) for children's choir, speaker, and piano
- 1978 Klee no ehon dai1shū (Klee's Picture book No.1) for mixed choir and guitar
- 1979 Klee no ehon dai2shū (Klee's Picture book No.2) for men's choir
- 1982 Norainu Doji for women's choir and piano
- 1983 Ballades to the Earth for mixed choir
- 1983 Poems of Animals for mixed choir and piano
- 1984 Poems of Animals for women's choir and piano
- 1984 Collection of songs "Died in the Country" for mixed choir and two pianos
- 1985 Letters To God for children's choir and marimba
- 1987 Umi (The Sea) for mixed choir and two pianos
- 1991 Yamagara Diary for children's choir, sanukite and marimba
- 1992 Asakura Sanka for speaker, mixed choir, Japanese flute and Taiko
- 1996 Kamuy no kaze (Wind of Kamuy) for mixed choir and piano
- 2007 The Day - August 6 for mixed choir and piano

=== Stage works ===
Incomplete list:

- 1959 Ondine, opera
- 1999 Faraway Sail, opera

=== Anime music ===
- Anne of Green Gables

=== Books and writings ===
- Akira Miyoshi: The Silent Beat of Japanese Music, in Japanese Essences (Japan as I see it – 3) Shichi Yamamoto, Kenichi Fukui et al., Tokyo. 1985.
- Yoko Narasaki: Toru Takemitsu to Akira Miyoshi no Sakkyoku Yoshiki (The Style of Composition of Toru Takemitsu and Akira Miyoshi). Tokyo: Ongaku no Tomosha, 1994.
