= In the Seven Woods =

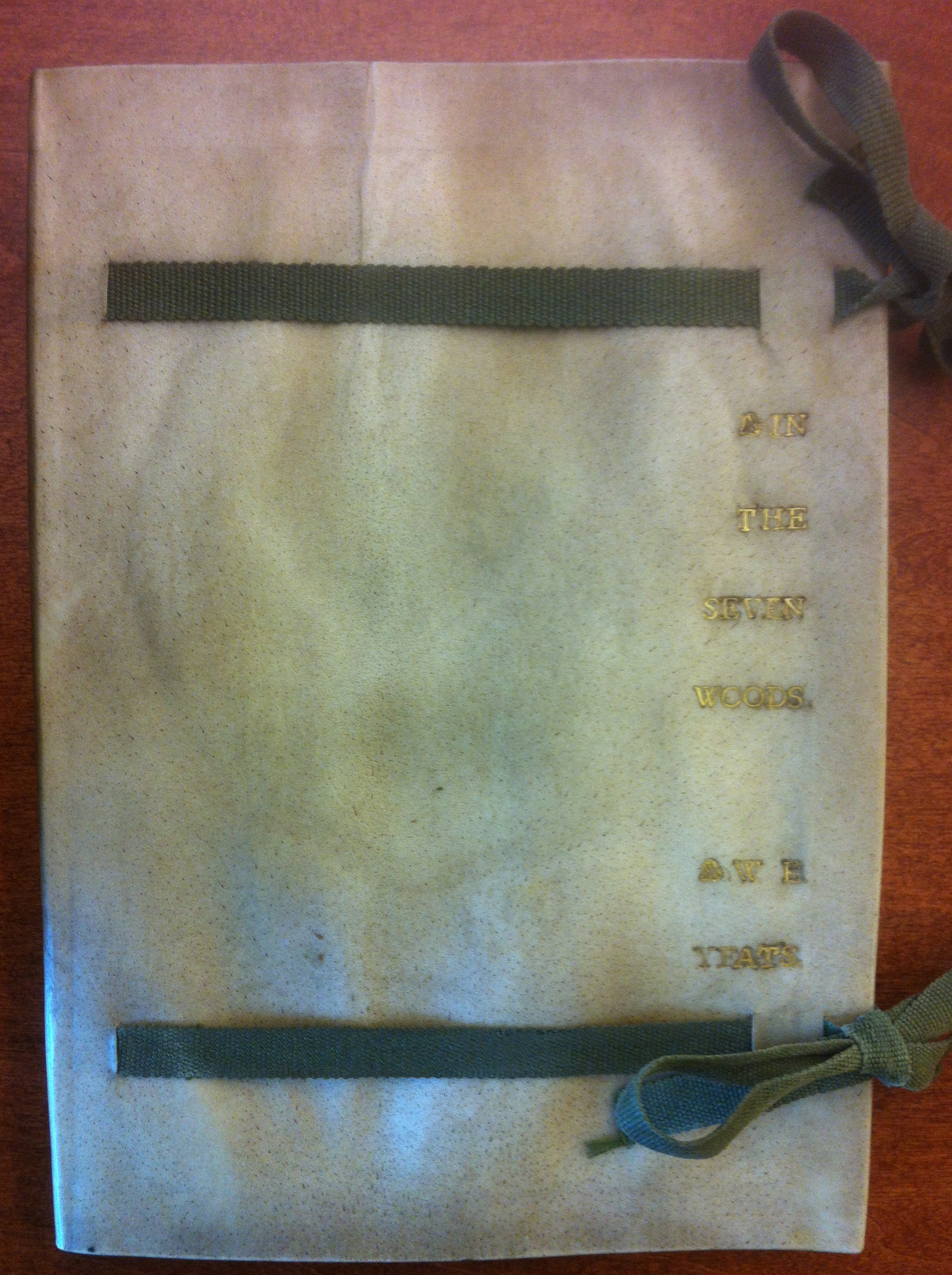
Limited First Edition, In the Seven Woods by W. B. Yeats

In the Seven Woods: Being Poems Chiefly of the Irish Heroic Age is a volume of poems by W. B. Yeats, published in 1903 by Elizabeth Yeats's Dun Emer Press, the first edited by this publishing house.

Dun Emer published two editions of the book in 1903. The more expensive collection was published on Dutch and Irish paper and is bound with a vellum cover with Irish linen ties (see image).

This is the first book of Yeats's "middle period," in which he eschewed his previous Romantic ideals and preference for pre-Raphaelite imagery, in favor of a more spare style and an anti-romantic poetic stance similar to that of Walter Savage Landor.

The poem "Adam's Curse", however, continues to reflect the old ideals. This is also the most popular and frequently anthologized of the poems from this volume.

The volume includes the play "On Baile's Strand: A Play".

== "In The Seven Woods" ==
This is the opening poem of the book:

I have heard the pigeons of the Seven Woods
Make their faint thunder, and the garden bees
Hum in the lime-tree flowers; and put away
The unavailing outcries and the old bitterness
That empty the heart. I have forgot awhile
Tara uprooted, and new commonness
Upon the throne and crying about the streets
And hanging its paper flowers from post to post,
Because it is alone of all things happy.
I am contented, for I know that Quiet
Wanders laughing and eating her wild heart
Among pigeons and bees, while that Great Archer,
Who but awaits His hour to shoot, still hangs
A cloudy quiver over Pairc-na-lee.

August, 1902.

== Index ==
- Title Page
- "In the Seven Woods"
- "The Old Age of Queen Maeve"
- "Baile and Ailinn"
- "The Arrow"
- "The Folly of Being Comforted"
- "The Withering of the Boughs"
- "Adam's Curse"
- "The Song of Red Hanrahan"
- "The Old Men Admiring Themselves in the Water"
- "Under the Moon"
- "The Players Ask for a Blessing in the Psalteries and Themselves"
- "The Rider From the North"
- Comment by Yeats
- "On Baile's Strand: A Play"
- Advertisements (in the cheaper version)

The collection was reprinted in 1906 in "Poems, 1899-1905" with two additions. "Old Memory" and "Never Give all the Heart" appear directly after "The Folly of being Comforted".

== Comment by W. B. Yeats ==
I made some of these poems walking about among the Seven Woods, before the big wind of nineteen hundred and three blew down so many trees, & troubled the wild creatures, & changed the look of things; and I thought out there a good part of the play which follows. The first shape of it came to me in a dream, but it changed much in the making, foreshadowing, it may be, a change that may bring a less dream-burdened will into my verses. I never re-wrote anything so many times; for at first I could not make these wills that stream into mere life poetical. But now I hope to do easily much more of the kind, and that our new Irish players will find the buskin and the sock.

== Colophon ==
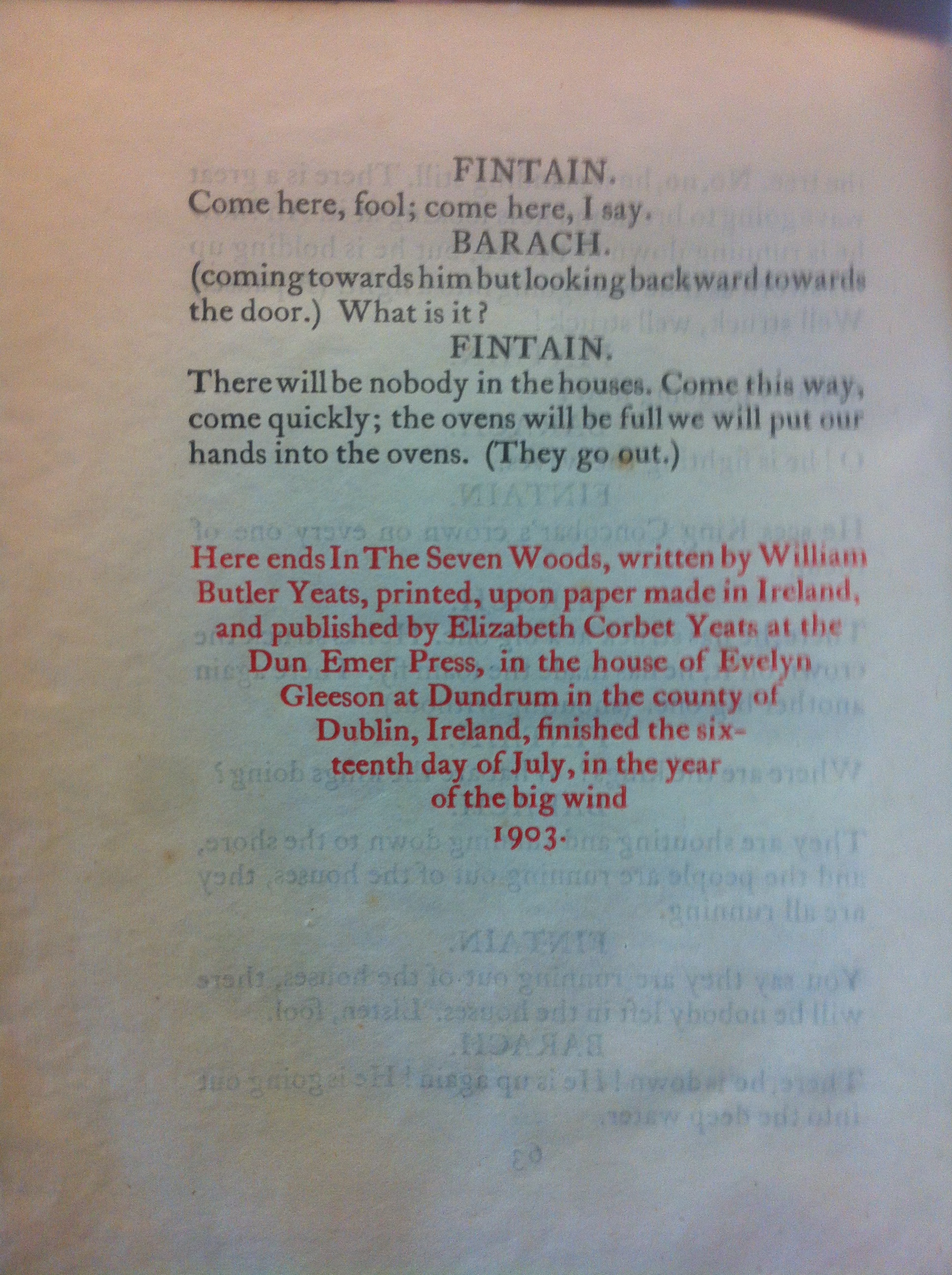
Colophon, In The Seven Woods (limited first edition)

Here ends In the Seven Woods, written by William Butler Yeats, printed, upon paper made in Ireland, and published by Elizabeth Corbet Yeats at the Dun Emer Press, in the house of Evelyn Gleeson at Dundrum in the county of Dublin, Ireland, finished the sixteenth day of July in the year of the big wind 1903.
