= Hisajo Sugita =

Japanese poet (1890–1946)

Hisajo Sugita (杉田 久女, Sugita Hisajo; May 30, 1890 – January 21, 1946) was a Japanese poet specializing in haiku.

Alongside Kana Hasegawa and Shizunojo Takeshita, she was one of the first women to produce modern haiku. She is held as an equal to her male contemporaries, and her work is known for its gorgeous phrasing.

She had a difficult home life and a turbulent relationship with her mentor, the poet Kyoshi Takahama. Her tragic life often became the source material for her work.

== Biography ==
=== Early life ===
Hisajo Sugita was born in Kagoshima City, in Japan's Kagoshima Prefecture, in 1890. Her birth name was Hisa, not Hisajo. She was the third daughter of Renzo Akahori, the minister of finance, and his wife, Sayo. Her father was frequently transferred to different places for work, so before she turned 12 years old, Sugita had lived in Naha, Okinawa; Chiayi, Taiwan; and Taipei. She graduated from Tokyo Women's Higher Normal School (now Ochanomizu University High School) in 1908.

In 1909, she married Udai Sugita, an art teacher and painter. Hisajo said she had always dreamed of marrying a painter. The couple moved to Kokura in Fukuoka Prefecture (now Kitakyushu), where her husband had been hired to teach.

In 1911, she gave birth to her first daughter, Masako. Five years later, her second daughter, Mitsuko, was born.

=== Haiku career and turbulent home life ===
Sugita's older brother, Gessen Akahori, who was a haiku poet, came to stay with her in 1917. It was then that he introduced her to writing haiku.

Previously, Sugita had aimed to become a novelist, but she became fascinated with the haiku form. She began to write for the Japanese literary magazine Hototogisu, with her first poem debuting in the magazine in 1917. In May of that year, she met Kyoshi Takahama at a gathering of haiku poets hosted by Misako Ijima. By that time, her husband had stopped producing art, and she was disappointed by her life with him. Instead, she became an ardent admirer of Takahama, and he became her mentor. Rumors of an affair swirled.

In 1920, as Sugita began to develop kidney disease, she also began to talk of divorce. But her husband refused to agree to it. He blamed the family discord on her focus on her work, and she temporarily stopped writing haikus.

In 1922, the couple were baptized and became Christians.

Eventually Sugita resumed her work, and in 1930 she won a national prize for scenic haiku. In 1932, she founded the women-only haiku magazine Hanagoromo, which ran for five issues.

Sugita was desperate to publish her own book of poetry. She wrote again and again to Takahama, begging him to write the preface for it, even visiting Tokyo to make a personal appeal, but eventually she was forced to shelve the project. In 1936, for unknown reasons, she was kicked out of the Hototogisu literary community alongside Sojo Hino and Zenjido Yoshioka. At this point, she found herself unable to focus on her work and fell into a long depression.

She returned to writing in 1939, putting a more autobiographical slant on her poems.

=== Death and legacy ===
After the end of World War II, in October 1945, Sugita was admitted to a hospital in Fukuoka due to nutritional deficits, as food shortages had plagued the country. On January 21, 1946, she died of a combination of malnutrition and the kidney disease she had long lived with. She was 56 years old. She was buried in the Sugita family graveyard in Obara Village in Aichi Prefecture (now a part of Toyota City), and in 1957 some of her ashes were brought to the Akahori family cemetery in Matsumoto, Nagano.

She did not live to see the publication of her long-awaited poetry collection, which her daughter Masako Ishi, who had become a poet herself, released in 1952.
