= Masanobu Deme =

Japanese film director (1932–2016)

Masanobu Deme 出目昌伸
- Born: 2 October 1932; Higashiōmi, Shiga, Japan
- Died: 13 March 2016 (aged 83); Tokyo
- Occupation: film director

Masanobu Deme (出目昌伸, Deme Masanobu; 2 October 1932 – 13 March 2016) was a Japanese film director.

== Career ==
Born in Shiga Prefecture, Deme graduated from Waseda University before joining the Tōhō studio in 1957. After serving as an assistant director under such directors as Akira Kurosawa, Shūe Matsubayashi, Hiromichi Horikawa, and Kengo Furusawa, he made his directorial debut in 1968 with Toshigoro and earned a New Directors Citation from the Directors Guild of Japan in 1969 for his unusual youth film Oretachi no kōya. He also directed over 80 dramas on television.

He died on 13 March 2016 of pancreatic cancer in a Tokyo hospital.

== Selected filmography ==
- Toshigoro (年ごろ) (1968)
- Oretachi no kōya (俺たちの荒野, Oretachi no kōya) (1969)
- Long Journey into Love (1973)
- Station to Heaven (天国の駅, Tengoku no eki) (1984)
- The Meridian In A Mist (霧の子午線, Kiri no Shigosen) (1996)
- Baruto no Gakuen (バルトの楽園) (2006)
