= Hototogisu (magazine) =

Japanese literary magazine focusing on haiku

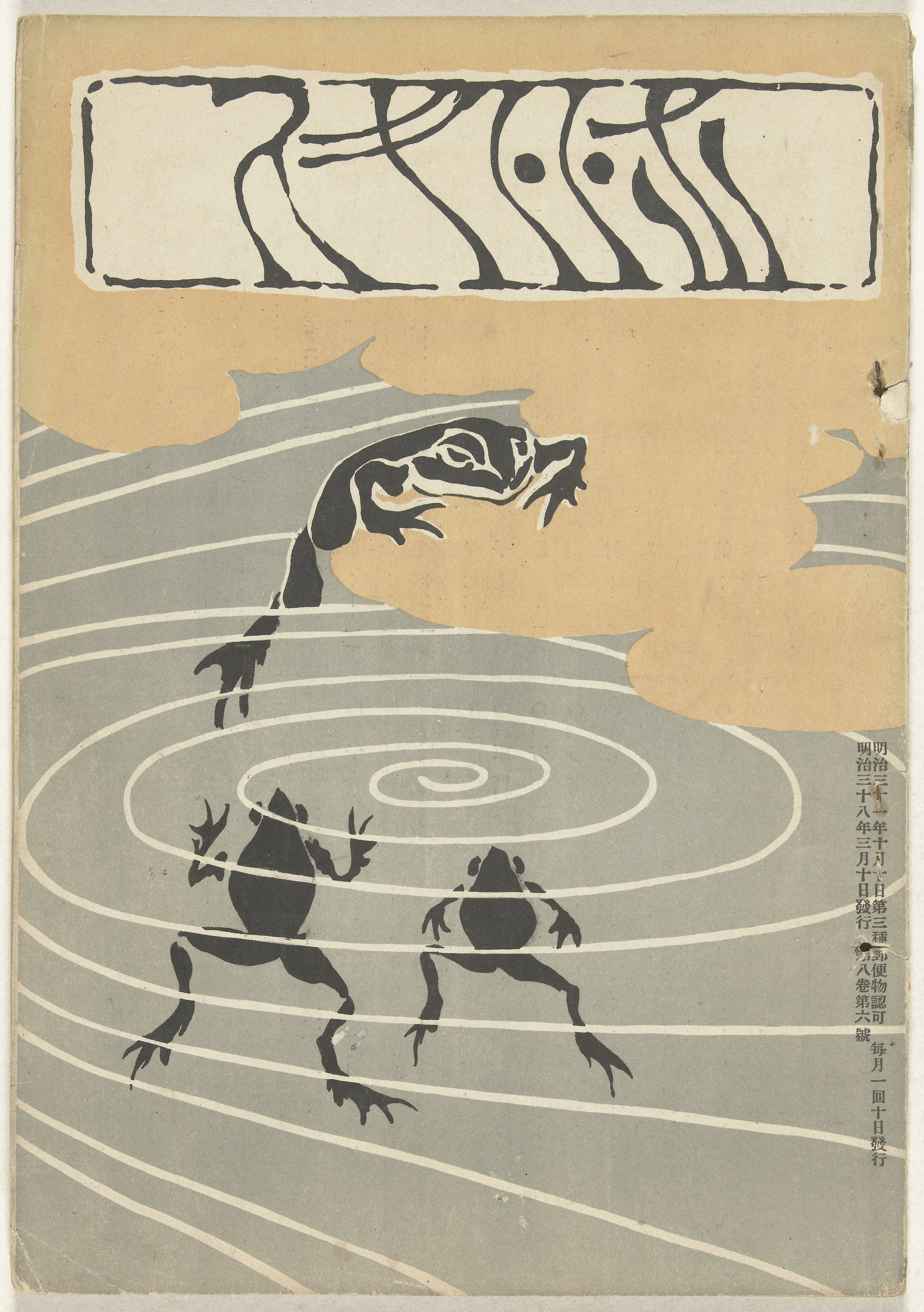
Front of Hototogisu, 1905 March Edition

Hototogisu (ホトトギス, "lesser cuckoo") is a Japanese literary magazine focusing primarily on haiku. Founded in 1897, it was responsible for the spread of modern haiku among the Japanese public and is now Japan's most prestigious and long-lived haiku periodical.

== History ==
Hototogisu was founded in 1897 in Matsuyama by Yanagihara Kyokudō, who edited it under the direction of Masaoka Shiki. It soon became the leading forum for Shiki's Nippon school of haiku. The following year, the magazine's headquarters moved to Tokyo, and its editorship was taken over by Takahama Kyoshi. At the same time, the magazine's scope was expanded to include tanka and haibun as well as haiku, and Shiki began publishing essays in his shaseibun ("sketch from life") prose style. It had established itself as Japan's leading haiku magazine by this time, and the first Tokyo edition sold out on its first day.

Following Shiki's death in 1902, the magazine's focus shifted to the fiction of modernist writers such as Natsume Sōseki, but in 1912, Kyoshi once again began including haiku.

In 1916, Kyoshi initiated the "Kitchen Miscellanies" column in Hototogisu to promote the writings of women haiku poets such as Hisajo Sugita.

When Kyoshi died in 1959, editorship passed to his son Toshio. Teiko Inahata (1931–2022), Kyoshi's granddaughter, was editor from 1979 until 2013. The current editor is Kotaro Inahata.

== Notable contributors ==
- Dakotsu Iida
- Takahama Kyoshi
- Takashi Matsumoto
- Yaeko Nogami
- Itō Sachio
- Sokotsu Samukawa
- Natsume Sōseki
- Masaoka Shiki
- Murakami Kijo
