= Kyoshi Takahama =

Japanese writer

- 高浜 虚子
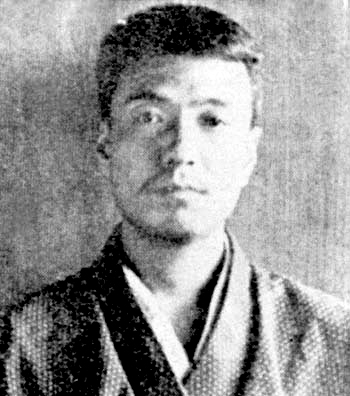
- Born: 22 February 1874; Matsuyama, Japan
- Died: 8 April 1959 (aged 85); Kamakura, Kanagawa, Japan
- Occupation: Writer
- Writing career
- Genre: Literary occupation

Kyoshi Takahama (高浜 虚子, Takahama Kyoshi; 22 February 1874 – 8 April 1959) was a Japanese poet active during the Shōwa period of Japan. His real name was Takahama Kiyoshi (高浜清); Kyoshi was a pen name given to him by his mentor, Masaoka Shiki.

== Early life ==
Kyoshi was born in what is now the city of Matsuyama, Ehime Prefecture; his father, Ikenouchi Masatada, was a former samurai and fencing master and was also a fan of the traditional noh drama. However, with the Meiji Restoration, he lost his official posts and retired as a farmer. Kyoshi grew up in this rural environment, which influenced his affinity with nature. At age nine he inherited from his grandmother's family, and took her surname of Takahama. He became acquainted with Masaoka Shiki via a classmate, Kawahigashi Hekigoto.

Ignoring Shiki's advice, Kyoshi quit school in 1894, and went to Tokyo to study Edo period Japanese literature. In 1895, he enrolled in the Tōkyō Senmon Gakkō (present-day Waseda University), but soon left the university for a job as an editor and literary criticism for the literary magazine Nihonjin. While working, he also submitted variants on haiku poetry, experimenting with irregular numbers of syllables. He married in 1897.

His descendants include his son, the composer, Tomojiro Ikenouchi and great-granddaughter and cellist, Kristina Reiko Cooper.

== Literary career ==
In 1898, Kyoshi came to manage the haiku magazine Hototogisu, which had been previously edited by Shiki, and moved the headquarters of the magazine from Matsuyama to Tokyo. In Hototogisu, he kept with the traditional style of haiku, as opposed to the new trend having been developed in the Hekigo school, which did not follow the traditional pattern of 17 syllables. Kyoshi attached importance to the symbolic function of the kigo (season word), and he tried to exclude the more modern trend towards season-less haiku completely. While editing Hototogisu, he also expanded its scope to include waka poems and prose, so that it became a general literary magazine. This was where Natsume Sōseki's Wagahai wa Neko de aru ("I Am a Cat") was first published, and Kyoshi contributed his own verses and short stories. These stories were collected into an anthology Keito ("Cockscomb", 1908), with a foreword by Natsume Sōseki, who described the contents as "leisurely tales".

In 1908, Kyoshi began a full-length novel, Haikaishi ("The Haiku Master"), which appeared in newspapers in serialized form. This was followed by Bonjin ("An Ordinary Person", 1909), and Chōsen ("Korea", 1912).

After 1912, he renewed his interest in haiku, and published a commentary on haiku composition, Susumubeki haiku no michi ("The Path Haiku Ought to Take", 1915–1917). However, he continued to write short stories, edit Hototogisu, and wrote another novel, Futatsu Kaki ("Two Persimmons", 1915). In addition, he began to show an interest in traditional Noh theatre, writing some new plays himself.

Kyoshi wrote 40,000 to 50,000 haiku in his lifetime, which appeared in anthologies such as Kyoshi-kushū and Gohyaku-ku. His major postwar novel was Niji ("Rainbow", 1947).

In 1954, he was awarded the Order of Culture by the Japanese government. As editor of Hototogisu, Kyoshi was instrumental in bringing many new writers and poets into the literary world, including Mizuhara Shuoshi, Yamaguchi Seishi and Takano Suju. He also encouraged his second daughter Hoshino Tatsuko to publish her own haiku magazine, Tamamo.

Kyoshi moved to Kamakura in 1910 for his children's health and a fresh start for himself, and lived there for nearly 50 years until his death. His grave is at the temple of Jufuku-ji in Kamakura. He was posthumously awarded the Order of the Sacred Treasure, 1st class, by the Japanese government.

== See also ==
- Japanese literature
- List of Japanese authors
