= Wakashū =

Historical Japanese term for adolescent boys

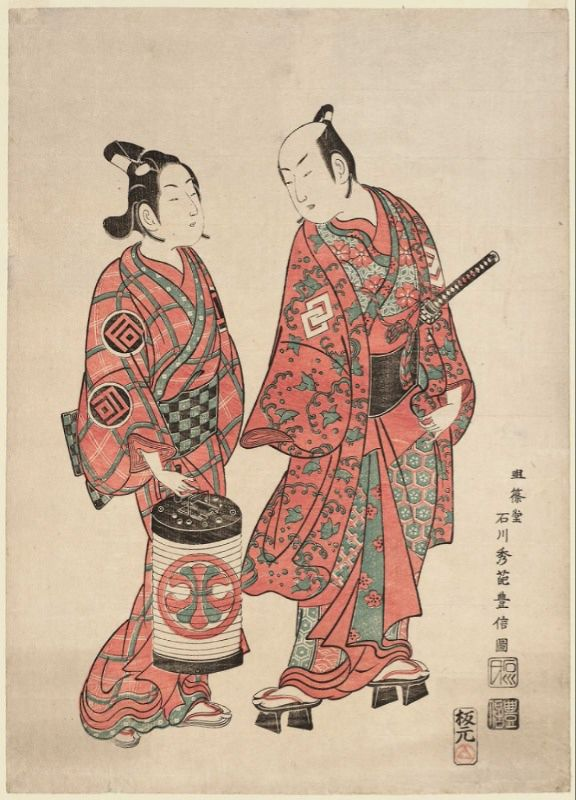
Woodblock print by Ishikawa Toyonobu, c. 1740, showing two actors portraying a wakashū (left) and an adult man (right). Note the difference in hairstyle.

Wakashū (若衆, lit. 'young person', although never used for girls) is a historical Japanese term indicating an adolescent boy, used particularly during the Edo period (1603–1867). Wakashū status was indicated by haircut.

== Appearance and ceremonies ==
Wakashū properly referred to a boy between the ages at which his head was partially shaven (maegami) (about 7–17 years of age), at which point a boy exited early childhood and could begin formal education, apprenticeship, or employment outside the home, and the genpuku coming of age ceremony (mid-teens through early 20s), which marked the transition to adulthood.

During this period, the wakashū wore a distinctive hairstyle, with a small shaved portion at the crown of the head and long forelocks at front and sides, and typically wore kimono with open sleeves (wakiake); boys from wealthier families could wear furisode. After the coming of age ceremony, the forelocks were shaved off, giving the adult male hairstyle (chonmage), and the boy assumed the adult male style of kimono with rounded sleeves. Although any person would be clearly classified as a child, wakashū or adult, the timing of both boundaries during the wakashū period were relatively flexible, giving families and patrons the ability to accommodate the development and circumstances of the individual boy.

== Sexuality ==
In Edo-period Japan, adolescent boys were considered as suitable objects of erotic desire for young women, older women, and older men (as long as the latter played an active sexual role). Age was an important, but not crucial aspect of wakashū. Thus, older men could sometimes adopt the appearance and manners of wakashū. This was the case particularly for male prostitutes, who would not be considered as a suitable object of homoerotic desire for older men (wakashūdo or shūdo) after reaching adulthood. In 1685, the shogunate reportedly cracked down on the so-called o-wakashū (senior youths) who delayed their coming-of-age ceremony until their middle 20s. One of the stories in The Great Mirror of Male Love by Ihara Saikaku features a samurai wakashū in his 60s.

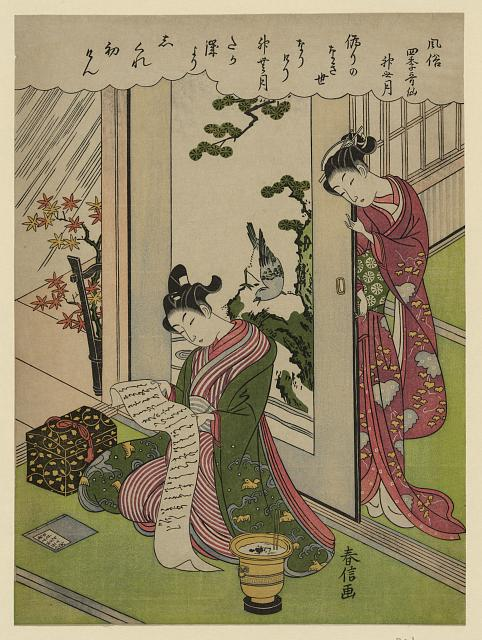
A wakashū (seated) and his female companion in elegant autumn surroundings. Note furisode sleeves worn by both. Suzuki Harunobu, polychrome woodblock print, c. 1770

== In the arts ==
Shudo (lit. 'the way of boy love') was associated both with erotic discernment (particularly among samurai) and with artistic refinement. In his book The Aesthetics of Boy Love Taruho Inagaki writes that only "members of a privileged class can understand the delights of boy love". The characteristic beauty of wakashū, which lasted only a short time, was compared to cherry blossoms. The cult of youthful male beauty in Japanese literature may be traced as far back as the 11th-century classic The Tale of Genji, whose protagonist is described as "such an attractive figure that the other men felt a desire to see him as a woman".

Wakashū were prominently featured in Edo-period woodcuts, where they are often distinguishable from the female beauties in the same pictures only by a sword or the shaved spot on the crown of their head. In erotic prints (shunga), they are often depicted as more feminine than their female partners. In some wakashū woodcuts, it is unclear whether the characters shown are adolescent boys or female prostitutes posing as wakashū to excite their clients.

Prostitution and acting were closely linked in early kabuki theater. Female actors were banned from kabuki in 1629 in an effort to crack down on prostitution, and the roles of women and young boys began to be performed by wakashū. However, since the sexual favors of wakashū were no less in demand, they were also banned from the stage in 1652, and these roles were taken over by adult onnagata actors or wakashū-gata actors specializing in adolescent male roles.

== Obsolescence ==
In the Meiji period (1868–1912), the term became obsolete; the first meanings were replaced by the new term shōnen, and the last by the related construction bishōnen ("beautiful boy").

== See also ==
- Bacha bazi
- Catamite
- Greek love
- History of human sexuality
- Homoeroticism
- Homosexuality in ancient Greece
- Homosexuality in ancient Rome
- Homosexuality in China
- Homosexuality in India
- Homosexuality in Japan § Pre-Meiji Japan
- Kagema
- Kagemajaya
- Pederasty in ancient Greece
- Pederasty
- Shotacon
