= Ukiyo-zōshi =

Japanese literary genre

Ukiyo-zōshi (浮世草子; "books of the floating world") is the first major genre of popular Japanese fiction, written between the 1680s and 1770s in Kyoto and Osaka. Ukiyo-zōshi literature developed from the broader genre of kana-zōshi, books written in the katakana vernacular for enjoyment, and was initially classified as kana-zōshi. The term "ukiyo-zōshi" first appeared in 1710 in reference to amorous or erotic works, but the term later came to refer to literature that encompassed a variety of subjects and aspects of life during the Edo period with the most common being that of the ordinary townsperson. Books of this genre included ukiyo-e illustrations often made by the most prominent artists at the time. The most prominent author of ukiyo-zōshi was Ihara Saikaku, whose works were not regarded as high literature at the time, but became popular and were key to the development and spread of the new genre. Saikaku was preceded by and worked at the same time as many other authors such as Shogetsudo Fukaku and Ejima Kiseki, all of which helped to shape ukiyo-zōshi and inspire future genres. Ukiyo-zōshi continued until the end of the eighteenth century, but its quality steadily declined. Overall, the genre lived for less than a century and died from conventionalization as well as a lack of new ideas for stories.

== Characteristics ==
By the time the ukiyo-zōshi genre first appeared, the commercial publishing industry had been fully developed. Ukiyo-zōshi books were published at a fixed size and length, and it was around this time that literature first began to be published for profit. For these reasons, prose literature, including ukiyo-zōshi, tended to be of low quality. Nevertheless, many ukiyo-zōshi works, particularly those of Saikaku, feature sophisticated literary techniques, structures, and insight into the lives and personalities of the characters.

Ukiyo-zōshi literature was considered popular literature and was written in the kana-based vernacular language. In contrast, elite literature, such as kanbun, was written in classical Chinese or classical Japanese and typically focused on traditional aristocratic topics, such as love and nature. The themes and plots of ukiyo-zōshi were opposite of popular literature in older centers in Japan, as those readers mainly consisted of ronin and samurai. The initial themes preceded Saikaku's by a year, and thus Saikaku was familiar with them before writing his own novels.

Ukiyo-zōshi covered a variety of subjects, many of which were considered vulgar or inappropriate for elite literature. A prime example is the kōshoku-mono subgenre, which consisted of erotic works centered on the pleasure quarters. The other subgenres of ukiyo-zōshi are chōnin-mono, which dealt with the lives of townspeople; setsuwa-mono, or tales of the strange or curious; and buke-mono, which focused on samurai. Most ukiyo-zōshi works fell into one of these subgenres and were aimed at a particular readership.

One important characteristic of ukiyo-zōshi is its intense realism. Since late kana-zōshi literature, a shift towards commoner literature and realism had been apparent, but it was not until ukiyo-zōshi that Japanese prose literature approached true realism. Ukiyo-zōshi is markedly less sentimental and reveals a more objective and cynical perspective. For example, many of Saikaku's stories end tragically and are written in a detached, ironic tone. Richard Lane says ukiyo-zōshi, "resembles early realistic novels in the West.”

== Initial authors and Saikaku's contemporaries ==
=== Nishimura Ishiroemon ===
Nishimura Ishiroemon was a Kyoto book publisher and one of the most prominent authors in the genres preceding ukiyo-zōshi. Over twenty novels were written and published by Ishiroemon in the 1680s. In his later works, he would copy the outline of Saikaku's works while keeping the storyline as traditional kana-zōshi. Main works include: Hana no nagori (A Remembrance of Blossoms, 1684), a known copy of Uramino-suke, a novel by Saikaku; and Koshoku sandai otoko (The Love Rogue in the Third Generation, 1686), his novel acting as a sequel to Saikaku's two books with similar titles.

=== Ishikawa Ryusen (Tomonobu) ===
Under the pen name Tomonobu, Ishikawa Ryusen was the "first important novelist of Edo" and credited with writing the first ukiyo-zōshi according to Richard Lane. Ryusen gained notoriety as a famed ukiyo-e painter from the renowned Moronobu School. His most notable works are Koshoku Edo murasaki (A Love-Tale of the Purple of Edo, 1686), written in Ryusen's unique style and encompassing themes of samurai vengeance, courtesan love, and young boy love; as well as the earliest surviving ukiyo-zōshi according to Richard Lane, Shitaya katsura otoko (The Fair Young Man of Shitaya, 1684), whose story follows Edoite, Gompachi, and his elopement to Oshun. Conflict occurs with the initial refusal of marriage by Oshun's father, but the couple soon earn his respect and eventually his pardon for running off together. The plot line happens to be a rarity, as elopement usually did not have a happy end in feudal Japanese literature. This work, as well as other amorous literature, drew subject matter from the Courtesan Critiques and guides to the pleasure quarters that became popular in the 1640s and 1650s.

=== Shogetsudo Fukaku ===
Considered the "most important Edo novelist of the early period," to Richard Lane, Fukaku started as a haikai poet before writing his first novel, Iro no someginu (Dyed Garments of Love), in 1687. This full-length novel was more popular in Edo, modern day Tokyo, while short stories were more popular in the older cultural regions of Kyoto and Osaka. The novel follows a boy who accidentally kills a priest, who happens to be his lover. In an unfortunate turn of events, the courtesan he falls in love with commits suicide and the protagonist turns himself in to the authorities immediately after so that he too can die. The book is well known for its illustrations which were made by the seventeen year old artist, Torri Kiyonobu, who was skilled in painting ukiyo-e themes with Fukaku's story being no exception. Fukaku only has two other surviving works, one of which is Koshoku someshitaji (Ready for Love's Dye, 1691) which follows Kinshiro, a Kyoto merchant, who falls in love with sequentially with Hanamurasaki, a courtesan, and then the young maiden, Omatsu.

== Authors following Saikaku ==
=== Nishizawa Ippu ===
Nishizawa Ippu writings appeared in the Kyoto-Osaka area after Saikaku's death. He wrote a total of twenty novels between 1698 and 1718 and quickly rose to popularity as he filled the void in literature which Saikaku left. Main works include: Shinshiki gokansho (New Tales of Love, in Five Parts, 1698), which mimicked Saikaku's novel, Five Women in Love, as it consisted of five novelettes which centered around tragic love stories; and Gozen Gikeiki (A New Gikeiki for His Lordship, 1700), which was a fictional parody of fourteenth century life of a man named Yoshitsune and his search for his mother and sister, both of which were courtesans.

=== Hojo Dansui ===
Saikaku's only pupil, Hojo Dansui started his career as a haikai poet, like Saikaku, and edited and published Saikaku's works after his death. His most notable work was Nihon shin-eitaigura (Japan's New Treasury for the Ages, 1713). This fictional novel takes place in Osaka and acts as a sequel to Saikaku's work while focusing on didacticism.

=== Lesser writers ===
==== Aoki Rosui ====
Originally from Kyoto, Aoki Rosui started as a haikai poet, but expanded his writing skills and focused on telling supernatural tales. His most notable work is Otogi hyaku monogatari (One Hundred Ghost Tales for Children), which is written in the kana-zōshi tradition.

==== Nishiki Bunryu ====
A joruri dramatist from Osaka, Nishiki Bunryu wrote novels from 1699 to 1706. His most notable work was Karanashi daimon yashiki (The Flower-Seal on the Mansion Gate, 1705), which consists of multiple stories of townsmen, similar to some of Saikaku's works. The novel focuses on millionaire Yodoya Tatsugoro from Osaka, who lost all of his property to the government and now wanders the streets in anger.

==== Miyako no Nishiki ====
Miyako no Nishiki's real name was Shishido Yoichi and he lived from 1675 to 1710. Born a samurai, Nishiki was trained in the Chinese and Japanese classics, but became disowned due to dissipation. From 1700 to 1703, he lived in Kyoto where he became a novel-writer, subsequently writing eight novels. His most quoted work is Genroku taiheiki (The Epic of Genroku, 1702), which is a collection of critiques against various groups of people. Another notable work is Okitsu shiranami (Thieves in the Offing, 1702), a collection of famous tales of robbers of past and present. To continue earning riches, he traveled to Edo. Unfortunately, he was mistaken as a ronin, arrested, and consequently banished to Satsuma Province. He was later pardoned but the banishment left his career in shambles.

=== Ejima Kiseki ===
Born in 1667, Ejima Kiseki did most of the actual writing for the original books published in the Hachimonjiya bookshop. However, all of his works were taken by and labeled as Hacimonjiya Jisho's for many years. This deeply upset Kiseki and led him to spend almost the entirety of his inheritance in the gay pleasure quarters of Kyoto. At the age of thirty-two, Kiseki turned to novel writing to make a living and earn back the money he had lost in the gay quarters. In 1711, Kiseki started his own publishing shop and broke off from Hachimonjiya because of the continued robbery of proper writing credit by Jisho and in an attempt to make more money. Unfortunately for Kiseki, his business failed, forcing him to return to Jisho in 1718. In a turn of events, Jisho agreed to credit Kiseki as a co-author on future works which encouraged Kiseki to stay at Hachimonjiya.

Influenced by Saikaku and the gay quarters, Kiseki focused on writing and created a new form of the ukiyo-zōshi. However, this new style was inherently influenced by Kiseki's own shallow and flawed nature, making his new works pale in comparison to the detail of Saikaku. Despite its superficial roots, Kiseki's new style was able to capture as much interest as Saikaku's works because of its clever plotting even though it lacked style and depth. Kiseki would also often plagiarize Saikaku, but his use of the plagiarized pieces were so skillful that it was difficult to distinguish them in his work. Enjima Kiseki died in 1736 and with him, his new style of ukiyo-zōshi. By the mid-eighteenth century, Edo had become the center of literary activity, and while ukiyo-zōshi continued to be produced until around the 1770s, the genre became stagnant after Kiseki's death and slowly declined.

Notable works Include:

- Keisei iro-jamisen (The Courtesan's Samisen of Love, 1701), his first novel which combined techniques of Saikaku's love novels and Courtesan Critiques, a form derived from Actor Critiques, set the form for his following works. The novel takes place in five different regions with one region being discussed in each of the five novels: Kyoto, Osaka, Edo, seaports, and the lesser cities of Japan. It starts with Saiken, a chart of courtesans and houses in quarters which include their ranks, price, and other related details. Each of the five books contain four to six short stories about famous courtesans in the area. The courtesan's actual names are included, but the stories they star in are entirely fiction.
- Furyu kyoku-jamisen (Stylish Virtuosities on the Samisen, 1706), a story in which an elderly actor and courtesan explain their adventures together and their love story to the reader.
- Keisei kintanki (Courtesans Must Keep Their Tempers, 1711), revolves around a controversial debate over which is superior: the love of a woman or the love of a young boy. The novel disrespects Buddhism by making it the subject of satire in which the reader could enjoy as Buddhism at this time period was a habit instead of a serious faith.
- Inyo Ise furyu (Stylish Love-tales of Ise, 1714), and its sequel Aikyo mukashi otoko (The Love Courtier of Old, 1714), are a retelling of the Tales of Ise in modern times. These novels are prime examples of Kiseki's ability to create interesting plots that capture the reader's attention.

==== Hachimonjiya ("Figure Eight") bookshop ====
Located in Kyoto, Hachimonjiya was known for their publications of joruri and kabuki playwrights in the late 1650s. During the 1680s, new management of Hachimonjiya Jisho led to an increase in status and distinction in the community, adding to its popularity and attracting more customers. In 1699, Hachimonjiya published Actor Critiques, which were pamphlets criticizing both the art of acting and actors themselves.

==== Kiseki's contemporaries ====
Notable contemporaries of Kiseki were: Ippu, Dansui, Getsujindo, Nagaido Kiyu, Jisho's son Kisho, and Jisho's grandson Zuisho. The last two most influential ukiyo-zōshi writers of this time were Tada Nanrei and Ueda Akinari.

===== Tada Nanrei =====
Tada Nanrei's most notable work is Kamakura shogei sode nikki (A Diary of Skills in Kamakura, 1743), which can be classified as a Character Book. The premise of the story is a group of daimyo taking turns telling each other humorous tales.

===== Ueda Akinari =====
According to Lane, "the last important ukiyo-zōshi was written by Akinari." An Osaka native, Ueda Akinari mainly wrote supernatural tales later in life, but at the age of thirty two he wrote his first books, two ukiyo-zōshi novels, under the pseudonym Wa Yakutaro. Main works include: Shodo kikimimi sekenzaru (All Kinds of Tales Heard in the World, 1766), fifteen unrelated humorous stories which took heavy inspiration from Saikaku's Tales from the Provinces as well as Character Books; and Seken tekake katagi (Types of Mistresses in This World, 1766) of the Character Book genre. This novel shares the difficulties of men in their affairs with women.

== Illustrations ==
Japanese literature uses imagery to convey moods of the characters as well as symbols critical to the story it is portraying. Japanese illustrations are unique as they have not only grown in popularity since they were first included in novels, but have survived the printing press which had to be adapted to include imagery. Through Edo-period illustrations, it is possible to see the manners, attitudes, and customs of the Japanese at this time. The near perfection of woodblock printing made recreating illustrations easier and faster, thus allowing the spread of visual imagery to intensify. In ukiyo-zōshi, the primary style of illustration used is that of ukiyo-e, imagery of "the floating dream world." This style itself developed from its less sophisticated predecessor, kanazōshi, which depicted realism. Ukiyo-e illustrations emitted romantic and sensual emotions that were inspired by the love affairs of courtesans and their lovers in the nineteenth century. The ninjōbon school of novel-writing used ukiyo-e paintings as the basis for the love stories, and the artists and writers developed their genres together, forming one of the most iconic styles of Japanese literature and art. The peak of this use of ukiyo-e illustrations with ukiyo-zōshi writing is a reedition of The Love Rogue by Hishikawa Moronobu, as well as its later adaption as a picture book in 1686.

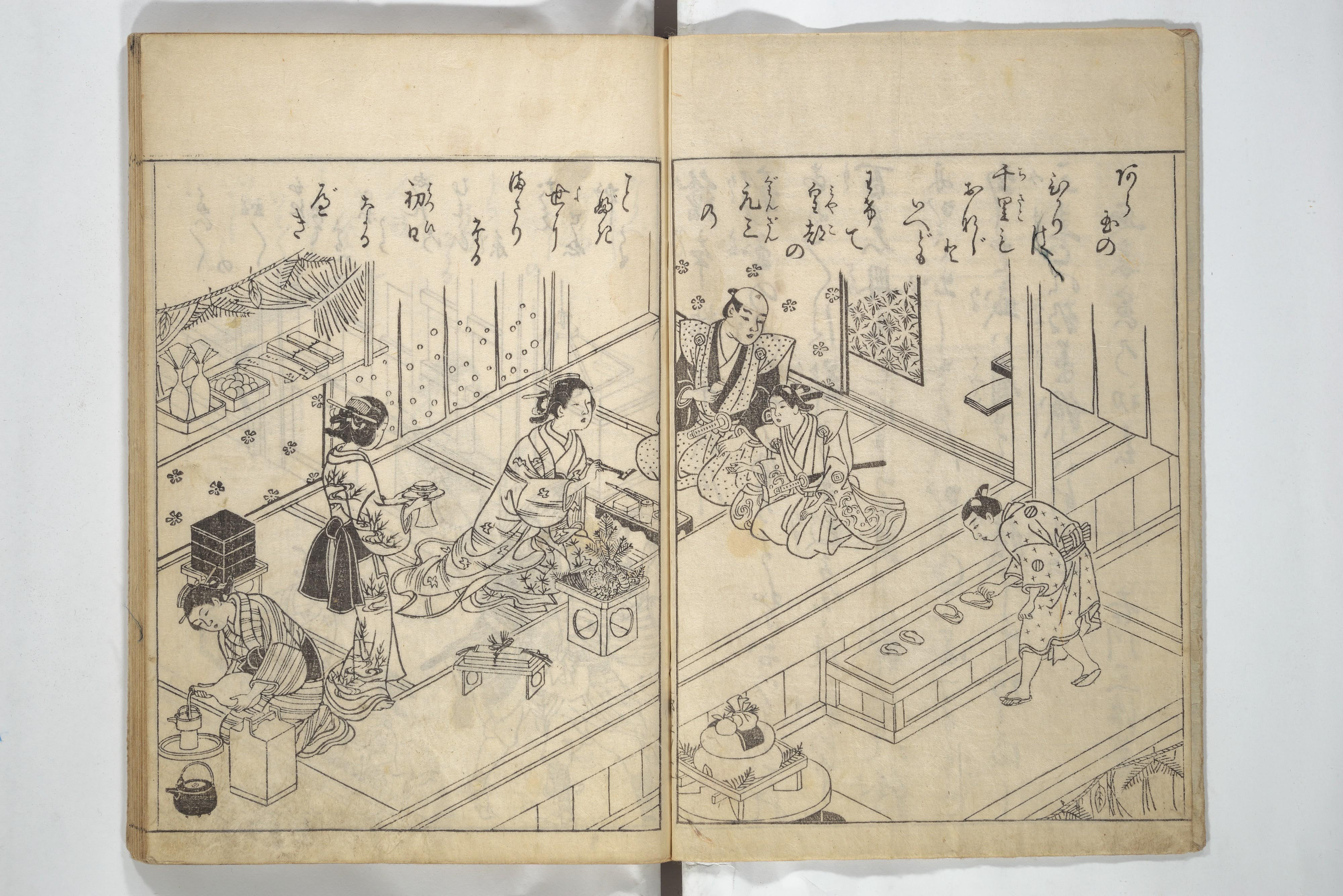
An illustration from a popular ukiyo-zōshi novel by Nishikawa Sukenobu

Ukiyo-e illustrations in ukiyo-zōshi books were able to give the author less work in terms of describing character appearances and background details while giving the illustrator creative leeway to fill in those gaps of description through included artwork. Unlike kibyoshi books which would cram text along the outlines of the illustrations later in the eighteenth century, ukiyo-zōshi novels had designated pages for artwork and kept the text and art separate. Unlike other genres besides kibyoshi, ukiyo-zōshi illustrations’ main purpose was to add visual beauty to the novel. A balance between art, writing, printing, prose, and engraving had to be struck to create the ukiyo-zōshi, with one person filling all of those roles much of the time. Notable works that Howard Hibbett addresses as striking a precise balance are: Kōshoku ichidai otoko (The Man Who Spent His Life In Love, 1682); and Kōshoku ichidai onna (The Woman Who Spent Her Life In Love, 1686). Not only do these works of Saikaku create a balance between illustration and writing, but they also inspired many future ukiyo-zōshi works, especially Kōshoku ichidai otoko. Its use of haikai poetry and allusions to the popular guidebooks of the day made this novel a hit and a major source for book pirates. These novels also created rivalries among competing authors as each tried to create their own visual adventure through the use of illustration. Ukiyo-e illustrations helped bring to life the descriptive nature of the ukiyo-zōshi novel.

=== Yoshida Hambei ===
Yoshida Hambei was the main illustrator of Ihara Saikaku's books and was a renowned ukiyo-e artist. It is estimated that he was active between the 1660s and 1690s, during that time he produced over half of the illustrations for Saikaku's works as well as many other ukiyo-zōshi novels. He was popular in the older districts of Kyoto and Osaka and his style and art rivaled that of the renowned Moronobu School in Edo. His art reinforced descriptive details elegantly in their matching texts as well as depicted narrative progression in the plot.

== Following genres and subgenres ==
=== Epistolary novels ===
A new form of literature started to rise which was still kana-zōshi but had new characteristics of the life of the average modern man. This genre developed during Saikaku's rise to fame. Works include: Shikiyoku toshi hakke (The Year's Divination of Love, 1688), a collection of love letters to a hero, all of which are declined; Koshoku fumi denju (The Tradition of Love Letters, 1699), a collection of five love affairs through letters. This was heavily influenced by Saikaku's love stories and earlier romances and continued through the eighteenth century because of its popularity. Real love letters were often based on this novel.

=== Katagimono (character books) ===
A new genre created by Kiseki. The core theme of this genre was to describe various groups of people through short stories which centered on specific themes, such as prodigal sons and poets. About fifteen people were included in each story who complimented the main theme. The creation of this genre can be attributed to Saikaku who wrote the prototype novel, Twenty Unfilials of Japan, but Kiseki is credited with fully developing it. Different types of people included are: actors, scholars, grandfathers, husbands, mothers-in-law, priests, physicians, and more.

Notable works Include:

- Seken musuko katagi (Types of Sons in This World, 1715), and Seken musume katagi (Types of Daughters in This World, 1717), are historical novels which was another genre of which Kiseki enjoyed writing. These books were based on kabuki and joruri dramas during Kiseki's time. They were the most popular genre of the time at Hachimonjiya.
- Kokusenya mincho taiheki (The Epic of Coxinga and the Ming Dynasty, 1717). The life of adventurer Coxinga who, two years prior, had starred in the drama Kokusenya kassen.
- Keisenya gundan (Courtesan-Coxinga Tales, 1717). Written by either Jisho or a ghost writer, this novel is similar to Saikaku's Love Rogue, about two hero's journey through the gay quarters and, according to Lane, was “one of the best novels published by Jisho.”
- Hyakusho seisuki (The Rise and Fall of the Peasantry, 1713). A Hachimonjiya book with an anonymous author, this novel is sympathetic to the peasants of Japanese society, a rarity in writing at the time. Its theme centered around peasant revolts and over-taxation of the government, a common occurrence. This novel stands out among its peers as it was not banned by the government, however it held little interest among readers.

=== Pornography ===
Because a common theme of ukiyo-zōshi was love and forbidden romance, pornography started to be produced in Edo where it flourished into a subgenre of its own. The most popular author and illustrator of pornographic novels was Torindo Chomaro, who created fourteen novels between 1695 and 1705. His most popular novel was Koshoku hitomoto susuki (A Leaf of Love's Grass, 1700), whose plot follows a samurai on a quest to seek revenge but ends up falling in love.

=== Picture-books ===
Picture-books were large scale adaptations of popular ukiyo-zōshi novels, often those with beautiful or notable imagery by well-known illustrators. The most notable picture-book is kyasha-otoko naskae no yujo (Fair Gallant and Faithful Courtesan, 1685), which is based on joruri drama, Nagoya Sanzoburo, which is about a Kyoto samurai who falls in love with Kazuraki, a courtesan, and successfully avenges his father's death by killing his murderer. It is possible that both the novel and the illustrations were done by Moronobu, but no one knows for sure.

== See also ==
- Ukiyo
- Ukiyo-e
- kana-zōshi
- Ihara Saikaku
