= Kanazōshi =

Type of printed Japanese book

Printed page of text from kanazōshi, published c. 1650

Kanazōshi (仮名草子) describes a type of printed Japanese book that was produced primarily in Kyoto between 1600 and 1680. The term literally means “books written in kana” (kana being the phonetic Japanese syllabary that is simpler to read and write than kanji, or Chinese characters). The designation thus derives from the fact that the text of these books was written either entirely in kana or in a mixture of kana and kanji. Kanazōshi are considered to be a transitional genre, bridging the gap between medieval romances and the first high point of Edo period (1600-1868) literature, the ukiyozōshi composed by Ihara Saikaku (1642–93). The genre comprises an unlikely assortment of essays, stories, travel guides for famous places, military chronicles, religious writings, and critical pieces. Despite the lack of uniformity in content, kanazōshi are classified as a distinct genre primarily based on the fact that they were the first literary works to be printed and widely circulated in Japan. Scholars also maintain that kanazōshi are generally of higher literary quality and more realistic than medieval forms, such as the otogizōshi, that preceded them.

== Characteristics of Kanazōshi ==
Before the 1620s, the only books available in Japan were handwritten manuscripts. The printed kanazōshi were less expensive and more widely available than these earlier manuscripts. They are thus considered the first example of commercial literature produced in Japan. One should keep in mind, however, the comparatively limited nature of their popularity. The cost of a single volume was still prohibitive, costing roughly the equivalent of what a laborer could earn for two or three days of work (4000 of Japanese currency). Moreover, the books, because of their small print runs (often only a few hundred copies), rarely circulated beyond Kyoto, Osaka, and Edo, the publishing centers in premodern Japan.

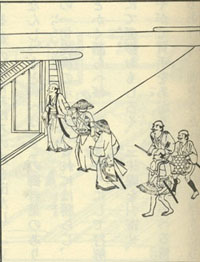
Illustration from Ukiyo Monogatari, showing patrons visiting the licensed prostitution quarter

Despite these limitations, the appearance of these books amounted to an important new trend in literary production. Closely tied to the rise of Japan's urban centers, the growing economic power of the chōnin (urban commoner) class, the improvement of literacy rates, and the advent of woodblock print technology, kanazōshi emerged as a new, distinctly plebeian form of literature. Its authors arose from the educated portion of the population, including scholars, Buddhist priests, courtiers, samurai and rōnin. But its readership consisted mostly of non-aristocratic residents of Japan's growing cities.

In contrast to otogizōshi and other forms of medieval Japanese tales, kanazōshi tended to be more realistic, with fewer supernatural or fantastic elements. Whether meant to entertain or inform, kanazōshi narratives conveyed more details about the characters and their setting, contained more natural dialogue, and showcased a more representative slice of life.

Although more skillfully written than otogizōshi, kanazōshi are considered less advanced in terms of structure and wordplay than the subsequent ukiyozōshi composed by Saikaku. Reflecting the tastes of their comparatively less sophisticated audience, kanazōshi often relied upon simple puns to generate humor. For instance, the term “hanatare”, which can mean both a runny nose or a drooping flower, is used to describe a young child with the family name of Fujiwara (wisteria field). This type of pun typifies the level of humor found in kanazōshi.

Each kanazōshi book consisted of between one and twelve slim volumes of twenty to thirty leaves each, with roughly one-fifth of the space devoted to illustrations. Book prices were principally determined by the number of volumes.

== Development of Kanazōshi ==
Scholars generally divide kanazōshi into two groups:

=== Early kanazōshi ===
Early kanazōshi were written mainly by the educated classes, including lesser samurai, courtiers, Buddhist priests, and scholars. Because these works were written by highly educated authors, they were often didactic, promoting moral behavior based on the previous generation’s sense of morality. The early kanazōshi are broken down into three categories: works meant to entertain, works meant to intellectually enlighten, and works written to educate people about practical matters. Kanazōshi which were written to entertain include war tales, romances and parodies of earlier classics such as Ise monogatari. Those written to promote intellectual growth mainly deal with reconciling the ideas of Buddhism, Shintoism and Confucianism. The more practical kanazōshi include travel guides, samples of well written love letters, and critiques of famous courtesans and kabuki actors.

=== Late kanazōshi ===
The late kanazōshi are those works which were written in the latter half of the 17th century. Unlike the early kanazōshi, the late kanazōshi were written mostly by commoners for a commoner readership. This shift in the social class of the authors is reflected in the fact that the protagonists in the later works are usually commoners. In addition, the language used in the later kanazōshi is more realistic, and male and female characters speak using structures that are specific to their gender. Many scholars believe that this shift towards realism paved the way for ukiyozōshi, a later genre which is partially defined by its intense realism.

== Representative Authors ==
Famous kanazōshi writers include Asai Ryōi (d. 1691) and Suzuki Shōsan (1579-1655). Main works include: Nise Monogatari (Tale of Falsehoods: A Parody of Tales of Ise), Shimizu monogatari (Tale of Shimizu), and Tōkaidō meishoki (Famous Sites on the Tokaido Highway). The most celebrated example of the genre is Ryōi’s Ukiyo monogatari (Tales of the Floating World, 1661), a comedic tale about a young man named Hyōtarō who gets himself into all kinds of trouble with gambling, prostitutes, and the like, and then learns valuable lessons about the proper way to live one’s life from town elders. One translation from Europe was distributed as kanazōshi – a three-volume edition of Aesop's Fables, from 1593, entitled Isopo Monogatari (伊曾保物語). This was the sole Western work to survive in later publication after the expulsion of Westerners from Japan.

== Printed Resources ==
- Lane, Richard (1957). "The Beginnings of The Modern Japanese Novel: Kana-zōshi, 1600-1682". Harvard Journal of Asiatic Studies. 20 (3/4): 644–701. doi:10.2307/2718366. JSTOR 2718366.
- Moretti, Laura (2010). "Kanazōshi Revisited: The Beginnings of Japanese Popular Literature in Print". Monumenta Nipponica. 65 (2): 297–356. doi:10.1353/mni.2010.0007. S2CID 162151559. Project MUSE 426304. [This article challenges the traditional view of kanazōshi and offers a new, alternative perspective on the subject]
- Fukasawa Akio 深沢秋男 and Kikuchi Shin’ichi 菊池真一, eds. Kanazōshi kenkyū bunken mokuroku 仮名草子研究文献目録. Osaka: Izumi Shoin, 2004. Updates available online at Kinsei Shoki Bungei Kenkyūkai 近世初期文芸研究会 Web site, http://www.ksskbg.com/kana/index.html%5B%5D. [a bibliography of Japanese studies about kanazōshi]
- Asakura Haruhiko 朝倉治彦, Fukasawa Akio 深沢秋男, et al. Kanazōshi shūsei 仮名草子集成. 46 vols. (to date). Tōkyōdō Shuppan, 1980–. (A collection of diplomatic transcriptions of kanazōshi).
