= Great Mirror =

Great Mirror may refer to:

- Speculum Maius, a 13th-century encyclopedia
- The Great Mirror of Male Love
- Ōkagami, a Japanese historical tale
