= Chōnindō =

Type of Japanese culture

Chōnindō (町人道, chōnin-dō) emerged as a way of life of the chōnin (町人; townsman, merchant, tradesman, trading class) during the Edo period of Japanese history. It was a distinct culture that arose in cities such as Osaka, Kyoto, and Edo. It encouraged aspiration to bushidō (way of the warrior) qualities—diligence, honesty, honor, loyalty, and frugality—while blending Shinto, Neo-Confucian, and Buddhist beliefs. Study of mathematics, astronomy, cartography, engineering, and medicine were also encouraged. Emphasis was placed on quality of workmanship, especially in the arts. For the first time, urban populations had the means and leisure time to support a new mass culture. Their search for enjoyment became known as ukiyo (the floating world), an ideal world of fashion and popular entertainment. Professional female entertainers (geisha), music, popular stories, Kabuki and bunraku (puppet theater), poetry, a rich literature, and art, exemplified by beautiful woodblock prints (known as ukiyo-e), were all part of this flowering of culture. Literature also flourished with the talented examples of the playwright Chikamatsu Monzaemon (1653–1724) and the haiku poet, essayist, and travel writer Matsuo Bashō (1644–1694).
