= Asai Ryōi =

Buddhist priest and writer

Asai Ryōi (浅井 了意; c. 1612 – January 29, 1691) was a Japanese writer in the early Edo period. A Shin Buddhist priest who was at one time head of a Kyoto temple, he is held to be one of the finest writers of Kanazōshi. Kanazōshi was a form of popular literature that was written with little or no kanji, thus accessible to many. Though it spanned many genres, a common theme in Kanazōshi works was the celebration of contemporary urban life. Asai Ryōi's work in particular turned traditional Buddhist teaching on its head in an expression of urban ideals.

== Ukiyo Monogatari ==
Tales of the Floating World (浮世物語, Ukiyo Monogatari; 1666) is widely considered the first work to revel in the difference between Buddhist ukiyo and Edo period ukiyo. Ukiyo was the concept that life is transitory and nothing worldly lasts forever. While the earlier Buddhist teaching concluded that one must therefore put one's energy into lasting spiritual matters that would continue to benefit one in the next life, urban Edo period ideals were more epicurean, and encouraged one to enjoy the pleasures of life as if each day were your last.

The hero of the piece, Ukiyobō, is a Buddhist priest who learns enough from a life of debauchery, gambling and general pleasure-seeking to gain enlightenment under the later guidance of his elders. The seriousness of the samurai is satirized and the liveliness of the townsman lauded.

== Otogi Bōko ==
Hand Puppets (御伽婢子, Otogi Bōko; 1666) is an adaptation of the more spectacular tales from a Chinese Book of moralistic short stories, Jiandeng Xinhua (New Tales Under the Lamplight). The stories are changed to reflect contemporary urban life. For example, in "The Peony Lantern", the original tale's protagonist dies horribly as a result of giving in to sexual pleasure with the spirit of a dead girl—the moral message is the need to accept impermanence and not be consumed by worldly desires. In Ryōi's version the protagonist almost saves himself from such a fate, but in the end chooses to die in his ghostly lover's arms rather than die pining for her—a celebration of real human emotions. The stories in Otogi Bōko fulfilled a thirst for supernatural tales and expressed the dichotomy between social obligations, or giri, and the reality of the human experience.

== See also ==
- Augustine of Hippo
- Chōnin
- Botan Dōrō
- Kanazōshi
- Ukiyo
