= The Life of Oharu =

1952 film by Kenji Mizoguchi

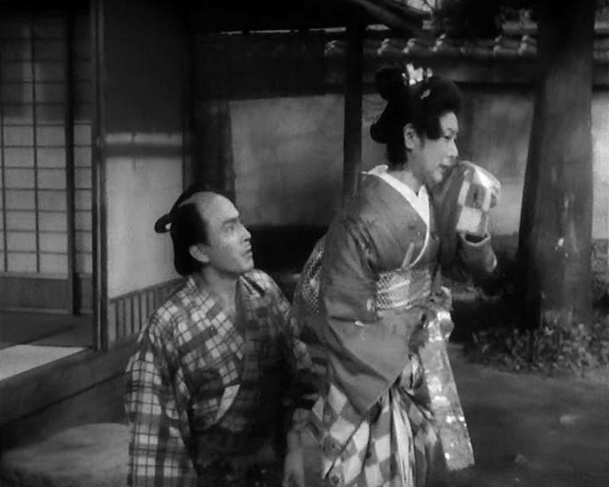
- Directed by: Kenji Mizoguchi
- Screenplay by: Kenji Mizoguchi; Yoshikata Yoda
- Based on: The Life of an Amorous Woman; 1686 stories by Saikaku Ihara
- Produced by: Hideo Koi; Kenji Mizoguchi
- Starring: Kinuyo Tanaka; Toshiro Mifune; Hisako Yamane; Jūkichi Uno; Ichirō Sugai; Eitarō Shindō; Eijirō Yanagi
- Cinematography: Yoshimi Hirano
- Edited by: Toshio Gotō
- Music by: Ichirō Saitō
- Production companies: Shintoho; Koi Production
- Distributed by: Shintoho
- Release date: 17 April 1952 (Japan)
- Running time: 136 minutes
- Country: Japan
- Language: Japanese

The Life of Oharu (西鶴一代女, Saikaku ichidai onna; lit. "Saikaku: Life of a woman") is a 1952 Japanese historical drama film directed by Kenji Mizoguchi. The screenplay by Yoshikata Yoda is based on various stories from Saikaku Ihara's 1686 work The Life of an Amorous Woman. Kinuyo Tanaka stars as Oharu, a one-time concubine of a daimyō (and mother of a later daimyō) who struggles to escape the stigma of having been forced into prostitution by her father. It has received critical acclaim and is considered one of Mizoguchi's best films.

== Plot ==
The story opens on Oharu, a struggling, 50-year-old prostitute. While taking shelter in a temple, she looks at a vast collection of statues of Arhats, whose faces remind her of the events of her life.

As a young woman in a noble family, the daughter of a samurai, she is courted by a neighboring Lord's retainer, Katsunosuke, and runs away with him. They are caught, and as a result (due to their class difference) he is executed and her family banished from court. Oharu attempts suicide but fails. Sometime later, a messenger from the local Lord visits her village in search of a mistress for the Lord. After an exhaustive search, Oharu is found to meet every criterion and is sold to Lord Matsudaira with the hope she will bear him a son. She does, but then, with her purpose served, is sent home with minimal compensation to the dismay of her father, who has worked up quite a debt in the meantime. He sends her to be a courtesan in the pleasure district, but there, too, she fails and is again sent home.

Oharu goes to serve the family of a woman who must hide the fact that she is bald from her husband. When Oharu's past as a courtesan becomes known, the woman's husband hopes to take advantage of her. His wife becomes jealous of Oharu and makes her chop off her hair, but Oharu retaliates, revealing the woman's secret. She again must leave—this time she marries a fan maker who is killed shortly after during a robbery. She attempts to become a nun, but Oharu is thrown out after being caught naked with a man seeking reimbursement for an unauthorized gift (it is made clear this is rape by Oharu's claims and distraught demeanor). She is thrown out of the temple, becomes a prostitute, but fails even at that.

The narrative finally returns to the opening scene, in the temple full of statues. Oharu collapses. When she awakens, her mother is by her bedside, having heard a rumor as to where Oharu was living. She learns that her father has died, and that so too has Lord Matsudaira. Oharu's son is now the young Lord, and is searching for his mother. Hoping to meet him and live in his palace, she returns to the Lord's house, only to be chastised for the "shameful" events of her life after her banishment from the palace so long ago. To keep her past a secret, she is to be imprisoned within the compounds, never to leave, but also never to be with her son. The young lord does deign to grant her the one-time privilege of looking upon him as he walks by. She chases after him through the compound, is herself pursued by his guards, and in the confusion, ends up escaping to pass the rest of her life as a wandering nun, begging for alms at every doorstep.

== Cast ==
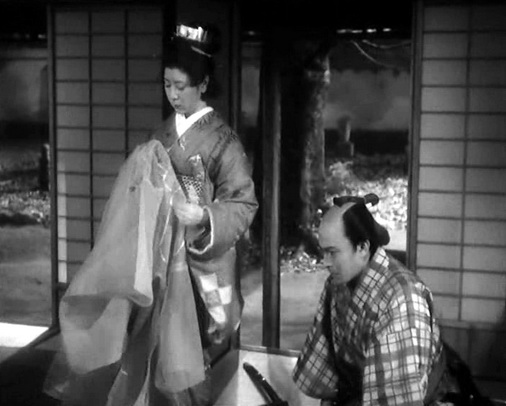
Toshiro Mifune as page Katsunosuke

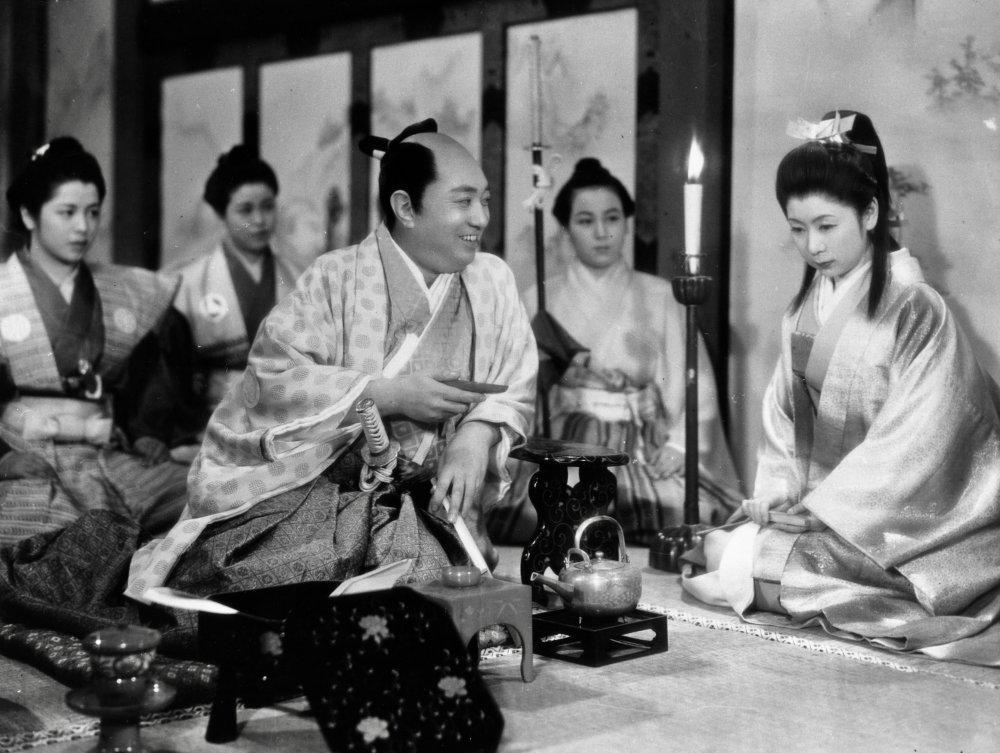
Oharu and fictional daimyō lord Harutaka Matsudaira (Toshiaki Konoe)

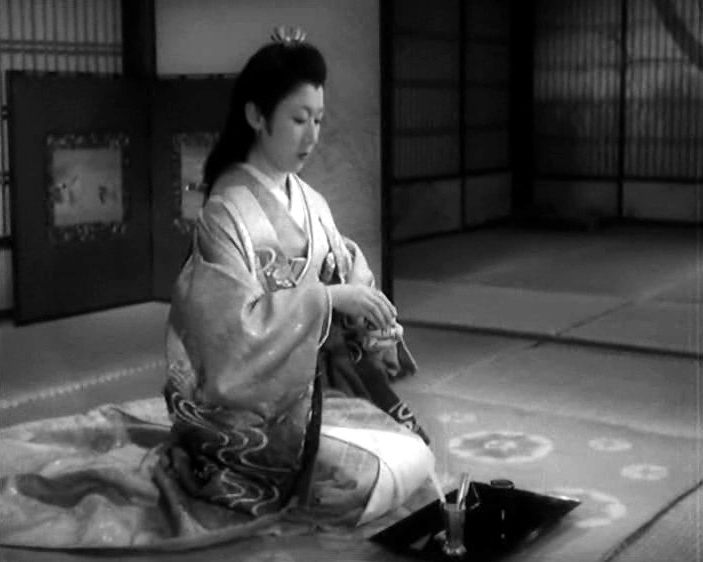
Hisako Yamane as Lady Matsudaira

- Kinuyo Tanaka as Oharu – the protagonist whose bad luck and misfortune lead to various struggles in life.
- Toshiro Mifune as Katsunosuke – a page who courted Oharu and they fell into a forbidden love. He is beheaded once their relationship is discovered.
- Hisako Yamane as Lady Matsudaira – the wife of Harutaka Matsudaira who, because of her jealousy of her husband's love for Oharu, banishes her.
- Jūkichi Uno as Yakichi Ogiya – he was a respected fan maker who married Oharu, however, he is tragically murdered shortly into their marriage.
- Ichirō Sugai as Shinzaemon, Oharu's father – Oharu's father was consumed by desire for money and social status. His misjudgments about Oharu caused much of her downfall.
- Eitarō Shindō as Kahe Sasaya
- Eijirō Yanagi as the forger
- Masao Shimizu as Kikuoji
- Daisuke Katō as Tasaburo Hishiya
- Akira Oizumi as Fumikichi, Sasaya's friend.
- Toranosuke Ogawa as Yoshioka
- Tsukie Matsuura as Tomo, Oharu's mother – a kind character in the film; her mother tended to side with Oharu and did not wish to see her become a courtesan.
- Toshiaki Konoe as Lord Harutaka Matsudaira – he takes Oharu as a mistress in order to bear a child heir. Unfortunately for Oharu, he falls in love with Oharu and his wife's jealousy causes her dismissal.
- Kiyoko Tsuji as Landlady
- Kyoko Kusajima as Sodegaki
- Hiroshi Oizumi as manager Bunkichi
- Haruyo Ichikawa as Lady-in-waiting Iwabashi
- Yuriko Hamada as Otsubone Yoshioka
- Noriko Sengoku as Lady-in-waiting Sakurai
- Sadako Sawamura as Owasa
- Masao Mishima as Taisaburo Hishiya
- Chieko Higashiyama as Myokai, the old nun
- Takashi Shimura as old man
- Benkei Shiganoya as Jihei
- Komako Hara as Otsubone Kuzui

== Awards ==
The Life of Oharu received the International Prize at the 1952 Venice International Film Festival. Composer Ichirō Saitō received the 1952 Mainichi Film Award for The Life of Oharu, Inazuma, Mother and Himitsu.

== Reception and Legacy ==
On the review aggregator website Rotten Tomatoes, 100% of 13 critics' reviews are positive.

In a generally favorable 1964 review for The New York Times, A.H. Wieler wrote "As an evocation of a noble-ridden society that took unheeding toll of its lower castes, the film makes a sharp, if obvious point. But the basic sorry, slowly unfolded with the majestic solemnity of vignettes on silk screens, is as obvious and lachrymose as a soap opera." Roger Ebert of The Chicago-Sun Times gave The Life of Oharu four out of four stars and added the film to his Great Movies list in 2012, writing, "Mizoguchi won Western praise earlier than Ozu...but it was "Life of Oharu" that he considered his best film, perhaps because it drew from roots in his own life... Years from the rise of feminism in the West, the great directors of Japan were obsessed by the lives of women in their society. No woman in a Japanese film that I have seen is more tragic and unforgettable as Oharu."

Tom Dawson, reviewing for BBC, wrote of the film,"Both formally beautiful and unsentimentally compassionate, The Life of Oharu deserves to be seen and appreciated on the big screen." In a review for A.V. Club, Ignatiy Vishnevetsky praised the film, writing, "What makes the film an enduring masterpiece--and what makes Mizoguchi one of the 20th century's major artists--is its ability to move, creating unforced sympathy for its title character.

Mizoguchi's film was included in Kinema Junpo's 2009 "critics top 200" list and in the British Film Institute's 2020 "The best Japanese film of every year – from 1925 to now" list.
