= Kujiki =

Historical Japanese text

Kujiki (旧事紀), or Sendai Kuji Hongi (先代旧事本紀), is a historical Japanese text. It was generally believed to have been one of the earliest Japanese histories until the middle of the Edo period, when scholars such as Tokugawa Mitsukuni and Tada Yoshitoshi successfully contended that it was an imitation based on the Nihon Shoki, the Kojiki and the Kogo Shūi. Scholarship on the Kujiki generally considers it to contain some genuine elements, specifically that Book 5 preserves traditions of the Mononobe and Owari clans, and that Book 10 preserves the earlier historical record the Kokuzō Hongi.

Ten volumes in length, it covers the history of ancient Japan through Empress Suiko, third daughter of Emperor Kinmei. The preface is supposedly written by Soga no Umako (+626). While it includes many quotes from Kojiki (712) and Nihon Shoki (720), volumes five and ten contain unique materials. The overall composition is considered as having been compiled between 807 and 936.

The Kujiki contains 10 volumes, but there are 3 false documents also called Kujiki, produced in the Edo period: the 30 volumes Shirakawa edition, Shirakawahon Kujiki (白河本旧事紀) (kept by the Shirakawa Hakuou family), the 72 volumes Enpō edition, Enpōhon Sendai Kuji Hongi Taiseikyō (延宝本先代旧事本紀大成経) (discovered in 1679), and the 31 volumes Sazaki succession edition, Sazaki Denhon Sendai Kuji Hongi Taiseikyō (鷦鷯伝本先代旧事本紀大成経).

The only complete English translation of the Kujiki was made in 2006 by John R. Bentley, who argued based on his examinations of extant manuscripts that the Kujiki was indeed written in the early eighth century CE, before the Kogo Shūi, and as part of the same historiographical movement that produced the Nihon Shoki and the Kojiki. Bentley took the preface, which attributes the work to the early-7th century statesman Prince Shōtoku, to be a later interpolation. In a review for Monumenta Nipponica, Mark Teeuwen criticized Bentley's methodology.

== Kokuzo Hongi ==
Record of the Provincial governors (国造本紀, Kokuzō Hongi) is the tenth volume of the Kujiki
