= Kagema =

Historical term for some male sex workers in Japan

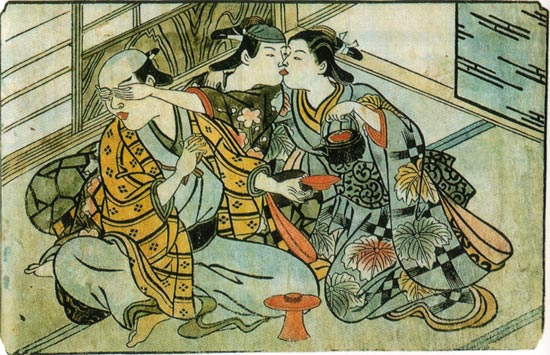
A man cavorts with a wakashū (probably a kagema) and a female sex worker. The wakashū (wearing headscarf) sneaks a kiss from the lady behind his patron's back. Nishikawa Sukenobu, c. 1716–1735. Hand-colored shunga print.

Kagema (陰間) is a Japanese term for historical young male prostitutes. Kagema were often passed off as apprentice kabuki actors (who often engaged in prostitution themselves on the side) and catered to a mixed male and female clientele. For male clients, the preferred service was anal sex, with the client taking the penetrative role; homosexual fellatio is almost unmentioned in Edo period (1603–1867) documents.

Kagema who were not affiliated with an actual kabuki theatre could be hired through male brothels or teahouses specializing in kagema. Such institutions were known as kagemajaya (陰間茶屋, lit. 'kagema teahouse'). Kagema typically charged more than female prostitutes of equivalent status, and experienced healthy trade into the mid-19th century, despite increasing legal restrictions that attempted to contain prostitutes (both male and female) in specified urban areas and to dissuade class-spanning relationships, which were viewed as potentially disruptive to traditional social organization.

Many such prostitutes, as well as many young kabuki actors, were indentured servants sold as children to the brothel or theater, typically on a ten-year contract. Kagema could be presented as yarō (野郎, young men), wakashū (若衆, adolescent boys, about 10–18 years old) or as onnagata (女形, female impersonators).

This term also appears in modern Japanese homosexual slang.

== Gallery ==
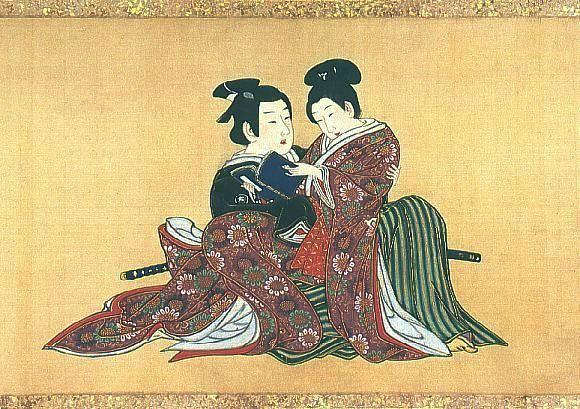
A kagema sits upon his elder patron's lap. Miyagawa Isshō, Spring Pastimes, 1750

== See also ==
- Catamite
- Greek love
- History of human sexuality
- Homosexuality in pre-Meiji Japan
- Kagemajaya (ja)
- Pederasty
- Wakashū

== Bibliography ==
- Bernard Faure "The Red Thread" 1998.
