= Nise Monogatari =

Nise Monogatari (仁勢物語, occasionally 似勢物語) is a Japanese kana-zōshi written in the early Edo period by an unknown author.

== Genre ==
Nise Monogatari is a work of the kana-zōshi genre.

It was written as a parody of the famous Heian period romantic poem tale the Ise Monogatari, specifically the rufubon (popular) text containing 125 short episodes.

== Authorship and date ==
The author of Nise Monogatari is unknown. The late-Edo period author Ryūtei Tanehiko speculated that it was the early Edo waka poet and Noh playwright Karasumaru Mitsuhiro, but modern scholars reject this theory.

It was written around 1639 (Kan'ei 16), and first printed around the end of the Kan'ei era in 1644. The illustrations included in the first printed edition are based on the Kan'ei 6 (1629) edition of the Ise Monogatari.

== Content ==
Unlike other parodies of classical works, such as Inu Makura (犬枕) and Inu Tsurezure (犬徒然), Nise Monogatari is a beat-for-beat parody of the content of Ise, with the setting changed from the sophisticated courtly world of the Heian aristocracy to the vulgar society of early modern Japan.

This work stands out from the other parodies specifically of Ise that appeared later (such as Okashi Otoko [おかし男], Kōshoku Ise Monogatari [好色伊勢物語], Shinjitsu Ise Monogatari [真実伊勢物語] and Nise Monogatari Tsūho-shō [仁勢物語通補抄]) in terms of the consistency of its humour.

It is centered around puns and humour, with the plot itself unremarkable and apparently not having been a concern for the author.

Given the stern reverence afforded the classics in the early Edo period, this work is of interest for the commoner's sensibility it applies to a particularly important literary classic.

== Textual tradition ==
The first edition was published around 1644 in two volumes, and saw several reprints in addition to new editions of the work being produced.

The work was also copied in manuscript form, such as the National Diet Archives copy in one volume, which provides useful historical data on the era in which manuscripts were still being copied by hand in Japan.

== Works cited ==
- Ogami, Shintarō (1983). "Nise Monogatari". Nihon Koten Bungaku Daijiten 日本古典文学大辞典 (in Japanese). Vol. 4. Tokyo: Iwanami Shoten. p. 601. OCLC 11917421.
