= The Life of an Amorous Woman =

1686 Japanese novel

- 1963 edition
- Author: Ihara Saikaku
- Original title: Kōshoku ichidai onna
- Translator: Ivan Morris
- Language: Japanese
- Publication date: 1686
- Publication place: Japan
- English publication date: 1963
- Media type: Print

The Life of an Amorous Woman (好色一代女, Kōshoku ichidai onna) is a Japanese short novel by Ihara Saikaku which depicts the ukiyo ("floating world") of Edo period Japan. It was first published in Osaka in 1686, consisting of six volumes each divided into four chapters. The Life of an Amorous Woman is written in the first person from the female protagonist's perspective, and shows, in contrast to Ihara's previous works, the darker and materialistic side of kōshoku ("passion").

== Plot ==
An elderly woman who lives in a hermitage tells her life to two men. She was born as the daughter of a family of court nobles, but lost her privileged status and fell through the ranks of both the nobility and the pleasure quarters, first as the mistress of a daimyō, then as a courtesan, and then finally as a common streetwalker. At each stage, the woman tried to free herself from the situations she found herself in, but was trapped by her own nature causing her to fail.

== Main character ==
The Life of an Amorous Woman is told by a first-person narrator, an old woman who reflects on her past in the form of a confession addressed to those who are willing to listen. She is successively wife, court lady, courtesan, priest's concubine, mistress of a feudal lord, and streetwalker. She is naturally beautiful and has experienced different encounters brought about by various identities throughout her life. However, her highly erotic nature causes her constant undoing.

== English translation ==
The Life of an Amorous Woman was published in English in 1963 as part of a collection of stories by Ihara, translated and edited by Ivan Morris.

== Adaptation ==
Kenji Mizoguchi adapted the novella for his 1952 film The Life of Oharu.
