= John Fox (writer) =

American novelist

John Fox (May 26, 1952 – August 14, 1990) was an American novelist and short-story writer. Fox was born in the Pelham Bay area of the Bronx and graduated from Cardinal Hayes High School and Lehman College.

Fox's only novel became famous and influential. The Boys on the Rock, detailed the coming out and falling in love of a gay teenage swimmer by the name of Billy Connors. The novel is set in the heady political atmosphere of 1968. The author Edmund White described the book as “Some of the brightest, funniest, most touching writing about adolescence...And if ever a book will give straight readers an exact sense of what it's like to grow up gay, surely The Boys on the Rock will".

According to his obituary in The New York Times, Fox died of AIDS in his Manhattan home in 1990, aged 38. He was survived by his parents, John Sr. and Joan, also of the Bronx; a brother, James, of Danbury, Connecticut; and a sister, Dorothy Schmidt of Malvern, Pennsylvania.
