= Tada Yoshitoshi =

Japanese kokugakusha

- 多田 義俊
- Born: 1698; Asada Domain, Settsu Province, Japan
- Died: October 12, 1750 (aged 51–52); Japan

Tada Yoshitoshi (多田 義俊; 1698-1750) was a Japanese samurai and scholar of kokugaku, known during his lifetime as an expert on ancient court ceremonial practices. He published ehon under the pen name Tada Nanrei (多田 南嶺), and also wrote under the names Shundō (春塘) and Shūsai (秋斎). His full official name was Tada Hyōbu Minamoto no Mitsuyasu (多田 兵部 源 満泰).

== Biography ==
Tada Yoshitoshi was born in 1698 to a gokenin family affiliated with Tada Shrine in Settsu Province. He was allegedly a descendant of the Heian period warrior-aristocrat Tada Mitsunaka.

He studied Chinese literature as well as the Suika Shinto of Yamazaki Ansai under Aoki Kazue (青木 主計) at Osaka. Tada subsequently became an active teacher of court ceremony and Shinto studies in that city. Later, he travelled to Kyoto to participate in research under the scholar Tsuboi Yoshichika. However, he was expelled by Tsuboi after publishing an essay in which he questioned the credibility of the Kuji Hongi.

Before his death, Tada gained as a disciple Kawamura Hidene of Owari Domain. He died on October 12, 1750.
