= The Boys on the Rock =

1984 novel by John Fox

- 1984 hardcover edition cover
- Author: John Fox
- Language: English
- Publisher: St Martins Press (hardcover); St Martins Griffin (paperback)
- Publication date: 1984 (hardcover); 1994 (paperback)
- Publication place: United States
- Pages: 146 pages (hardcover); 160 pages (paperback)
- ISBN: 0-312-09419-1
- OCLC: 10274692
- Dewey Decimal: 813/.54 Fic 19
- LC Class: PS3556.O934 B6 1984

The Boys on the Rock is a novel by John Fox, which follows the coming out and first love of a gay sixteen-year-old swimmer.

== Plot ==
Set in the Bronx against the historical backdrop of United States Senator Eugene McCarthy's unsuccessful bid to become the Democratic presidential candidate for the 1968 elections, the novel focuses on Connors's "rocky relationship that fared no better than McCarthy's campaign", in the words of critic Wayne Hoffman (author of the novel Hard), who described it in The Washington Post as a "classic".

== Reception ==
Kirkus Reviews called it "a slight first novel with an uneasy blend of graphic sex, a faux-naif Y A tone, and gay-pride preachiness." and found it "Occasionally sharp in its place/time specifics, but otherwise a juvenile debut–both punkily narcissistic and sloppily sentimental." while Trevor Sydney said that "Fox's only novel remains a compelling Bildungsroman."

== International influence ==
The Boys on the Rock has been described as "A watershed in the history of the translation of queer literature into Japanese...". Its translation "was subsequently followed by a large number of translations of novels about queer desire - more specifically about gay men in the West."

== Editions ==
1994 Stonewall Inn paperback edition

The popularity of Boys on the Rock is evidenced in the substantial quantity of editions to which it ran, having first been published in 1984 by St. Martin's Press in New York.

A Stonewall Inn paperback edition was published in 1994 by St. Martin Griffin.
