= The Great Mirror of Male Love =

1687 collection of homosexuality stories by Ihara Saikaku

The Great Mirror of Male Love (男色大鏡 Nanshoku Ōkagami), with the subtitle The Custom of Boy Love in Our Land (本朝若風俗 Honchō Waka Fūzoku) is a collection of homosexuality stories by Ihara Saikaku, published in 1687. The collection belongs to Ihara's floating world genre of Japanese literature (浮世草子 Ukiyo-zōshi), and contains eight sections; each section contains five chapters, making 40 chapters in total.

== Contents ==
The Great Mirror of Male Love has two parts: the first four sections (first 20 chapters) embody romantic relationships between warriors and monks; the next four sections center about the Kyoto-Osaka theatres, dealing with male loving stories about the kabuki actors. The stories are usually about homoerotic relationships between an adult male and an adolescent youth; the ethical constraints are very much like that of a man and a woman. In the first four sections, the samurai senior lovers are the image of manliness, supporter to the younger one, and the dominant role in sex. The young beloved boys are portrayed as beautiful, good students of the older samurai, and assume a submissive role in sex. From section 5 onward, the young kabuki actors are more like prostitutes to the older townsmen; however, recreational sex was a common practice in Edo period Japan, therefore the relationships between the townsmen and the kabuki actors are still considered romantic accounts.

=== Preface ===
Saikaku claimed that heaven and earth in Japanese mythology are bound in the same way that two male lovers are bound. Women managed to capture the attention of men since the creation of the world, he added, but they were no more than an amusement to retired old men, and there was no way that women can be worthy enough to be compared to handsome youth.

=== Section One ===
1. Love: The Contest Between Two Forces
2. The ABCs of Boy Love
3. Within the Fence: Pine, Maple, and a Willow Waist
4. Love Letter Sent in a Sea Bass
5. Implicated by His Diamond Crest

=== Section Two ===
1. A Sword His Only Memento
2. Though Bearing an Umbrella, he Was Rained Upon
3. His Head Shaved on the Path of Dreams
4. Aloeswood Boy of the East
5. Nightingale in the Snow

=== Section Three ===
1. Grudge Provoked by a Sedge Hat
2. Tortured to Death with Snow on His Sleeve
3. The Sword That Survived Love's Flames
4. The Sickbed No Medicine Could Cure
5. He Fell in Love When the Mountain Rose Was in Bloom

=== Section Four ===
1. Drowned by Love in Winecups of Pearl Nautilus Shells
2. The Boy who Sacrificed His Life in the Robes of His Lover
3. They Waited Three Years to Die
4. Two Old Cherry Trees Still in Bloom
5. Handsome Youths having Fun Cause Trouble for a Temple

=== Section Five ===
1. Tears in a Paper Shop
2. He Pleaded for His Life at Mitsudera Hachiman
3. Love's Flame Kindled by a Flint Seller
4. Visiting from Edo, Suddenly a Monk
5. Voting Picture of Kichiya Riding a Horse

=== Section Six ===
1. A Huge Winecup Overflowing with Love
2. Kozakura's Figure: Grafted Branches of a Cherry Tree
3. The Man Who Resented Another's Shouts
4. A Secret Visit Leads to the Wrong Bed
5. A Terrible Shame He Never Performed in the Capital

=== Section Seven ===
1. Fireflies Also Work Their Asses at Night
2. An Onnagata's Tosa Diary
3. An Unworn Robe to Remember Him by
4. Bamboo Clappers Strike the Hateful Number
5. Nails Hammered into an Amateur Painting

=== Section Eight ===
1. A Verse Sung by a Goblin with a Beautiful Voice
2. Siamese Roosters and the Reluctant Farewell
3. Loved by a Man in a Box
4. The Koyama Barrier Keeper
5. Who Wears the Incense Graph Dyed in Her Heart?

== Reception ==
The first release of The Great Mirror of Male Love was on the New Year Eve of 1687. The book was expected to be the best-seller of the year.

=== Translation ===
The first English translation of The Great Mirror of Male Love was by Paul Gordon Schalow. Schalow explained that there were two types of audiences for this collection: connoisseurs of boys (常人好き) and woman-haters (女嫌い). The former would be equivalent to bisexual in modern conception, and the latter would be equivalent to homosexual. Ihara structured the collection around the homosexual ethos of woman-hating, thus explaining the misogynist tone of the original work, which initially caused Schalow's translation to be offensive to women readers. Schalow purposely avoided using cultural phrases such as heterosexual, gay, or lesbian etc.
