= Ukiyo =

Urban cultural lifestyle of Edo Japan (1600–1867)

Onnayu (Ladies' Bath), a colored ukiyo-e print by Torii Kiyonaga (1752–1815) depicting a male sansuke (upper left corner) attending on women at a public bathhouse

Ukiyo (浮世, 'floating/fleeting/transient world') is the Japanese term used to describe the urban lifestyle and culture of Edo period Japan (1600–1867), especially its pleasure-seeking aspects.

== Ukiyo culture ==
Ukiyo culture developed in Yoshiwara, the licensed red-light district of Edo (modern-day Tokyo), the site of many brothels frequented by Japan's growing middle class. A prominent author of the ukiyo genre was Ihara Saikaku, who wrote The Life of an Amorous Woman. Ukiyo culture also arose in other cities, such as Osaka and Kyoto.

This middle class, newly rich merchants known as chōnin, were unable to move up the social ladder due to the segregated class system imposed by the Tokugawa shogunate during the Edo period. As commerce was regarded as morally deficient and the pursuit of wealth a sign of spiritual weakness, the chōnin were legally defined as the lowest class of four, below warriors, farmers and artisans. Due to being economically powerful but socially confined, they devoted themselves to conspicuous consumption, arts and culture.

The term "ukiyo" in medieval Japan was associated with Buddhism and meant "this transient, unreliable world". When written as 浮世 meaning "the floating world", is also an ironic, homophonous allusion to the earlier Buddhist term ukiyo (憂き世, "sorrowful world"), referring to the earthly plane of death and rebirth from which Buddhists sought release.

In its modern usage, the term ukiyo is used to refer to a state of mind emphasising living in the moment, detached from the difficulties of life.

== In arts ==
The famous Japanese woodblock prints known as ukiyo-e, or "pictures of the floating world", had their origins in these districts, and often depicted scenes of the floating world itself such as geisha, kabuki actors, sumo wrestlers, samurai, merchants, and prostitutes.

== See also ==
- Demimonde
- Iki
