= Ihara Saikaku =

17th century Japanese poet

Ihara Saikaku 井原 西鶴
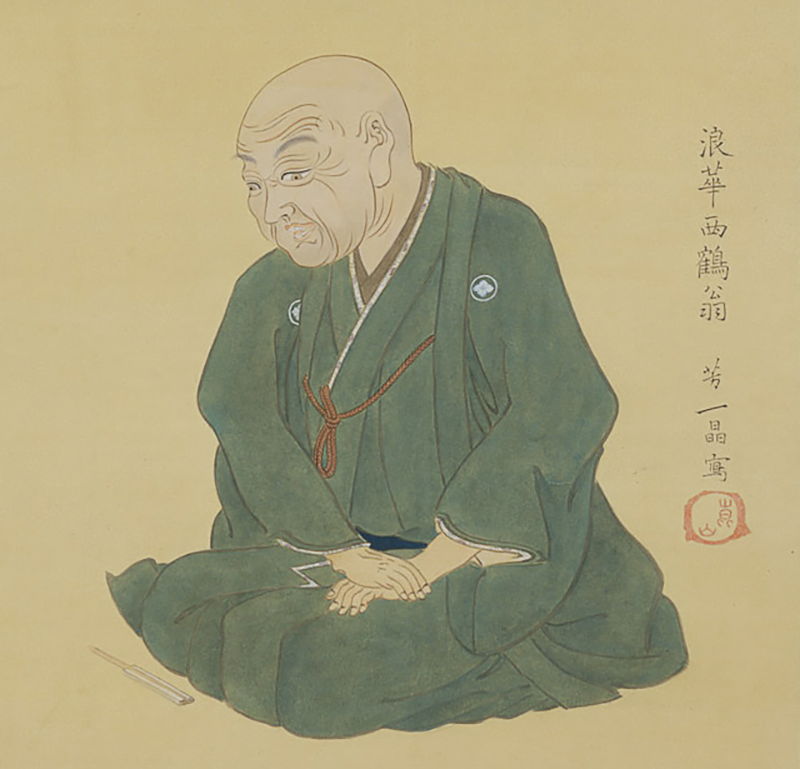
- Portrait of Ihara Saikaku
- Born: Hirayama Togo (平山藤五); 1642; Osaka, Japan
- Died: September 9, 1693 (aged 50–51); Osaka, Japan
- Occupation: Writer
- Writing career
- Genres: Poetry, Fiction
- Movement: Ukiyo-zōshi

Ihara Saikaku (井原 西鶴; Japanese pronunciation: [í.bä̀.ɾä̀ | ꜜsä́ì.kä̀.kɯ̈̀, ì.bä́.ɾä́ sä́ì-]; 1642 – September 9, 1693)) was a Japanese poet and creator of the "floating world" genre of Japanese prose (ukiyo-zōshi).

His born name may have been Hirayama Tōgo (平山藤五), the son of a wealthy merchant in Osaka, and he first studied haikai poetry under a follower of Matsunaga Teitoku and later studied under Nishiyama Sōin of the Danrin school of poetry, which emphasized comic linked verse. Scholars have described numerous extraordinary feats of solo haikai composition at one sitting; most famously, over the course of a single day and night in 1677 Saikaku is known to have composed 1,600 haikai verses and an amazing 23,500 verses in a single day and night in 1684.

Later in life he began writing racy accounts of the financial and amorous affairs of the merchant class and the demimonde. These stories catered to the whims of the newly prominent merchant class, whose tastes of entertainment leaned toward the arts and pleasure districts.

== Biography ==
Ihara Saikaku was born in 1642 into a well-off merchant family in Osaka. From the age of fifteen he composed haikai no renga (linked verse). In 1662 at the age of twenty he became a haikai master. Under the pen name Ihara Kakuei, he began to establish himself as a popular haikai poet. By 1670 he had developed his own distinctive style, using colloquial language to depict contemporary chōnin life. During this time he owned and ran a medium-sized business in Osaka.

In 1673 he changed his pen name to Saikaku. However, the death of his dearly beloved wife in 1675 had an extremely profound impact on him. A few days after her death, in an act of grief and true love, Saikaku started to compose a thousand-verse haikai poem over twelve hours. When this work was published it was called Haikai Single Day Thousand Verse (Haikai Dokugin Ichinichi). It was the first time that Saikaku had attempted to compose such a lengthy piece of literature. The overall experience and success that Saikaku received from composing such a mammoth exercise has been credited with sparking the writer's interest in writing novels.

Shortly after his wife's death, the grief-stricken Saikaku decided to become a lay monk and began to travel all across Japan, thus leaving behind his three children (one of whom was blind) to be cared for by his extended family and his business by his employees. He started his travels after the death of his blind daughter.

In 1677 Saikaku returned to Osaka and had learned of the success his thousand-verse haikai poem had received. From then on he pursued a career as a professional writer. Initially Saikaku continued to produce haikai poetry, but by 1682 he had published The Life of an Amorous Man, the first of his many works of prose fiction.

As Saikaku's popularity and readership began to increase and expand across Japan, so did the amount of literature he published. When he died in 1693, at the age of fifty-one, Saikaku was one of the most popular writers of the entire Tokugawa period. At the time his work was never considered "high" literature because it had been aimed towards and popularised by the chōnin. Nevertheless, Saikaku's work is now celebrated for its significance in the development of Japanese fiction.

== Works ==
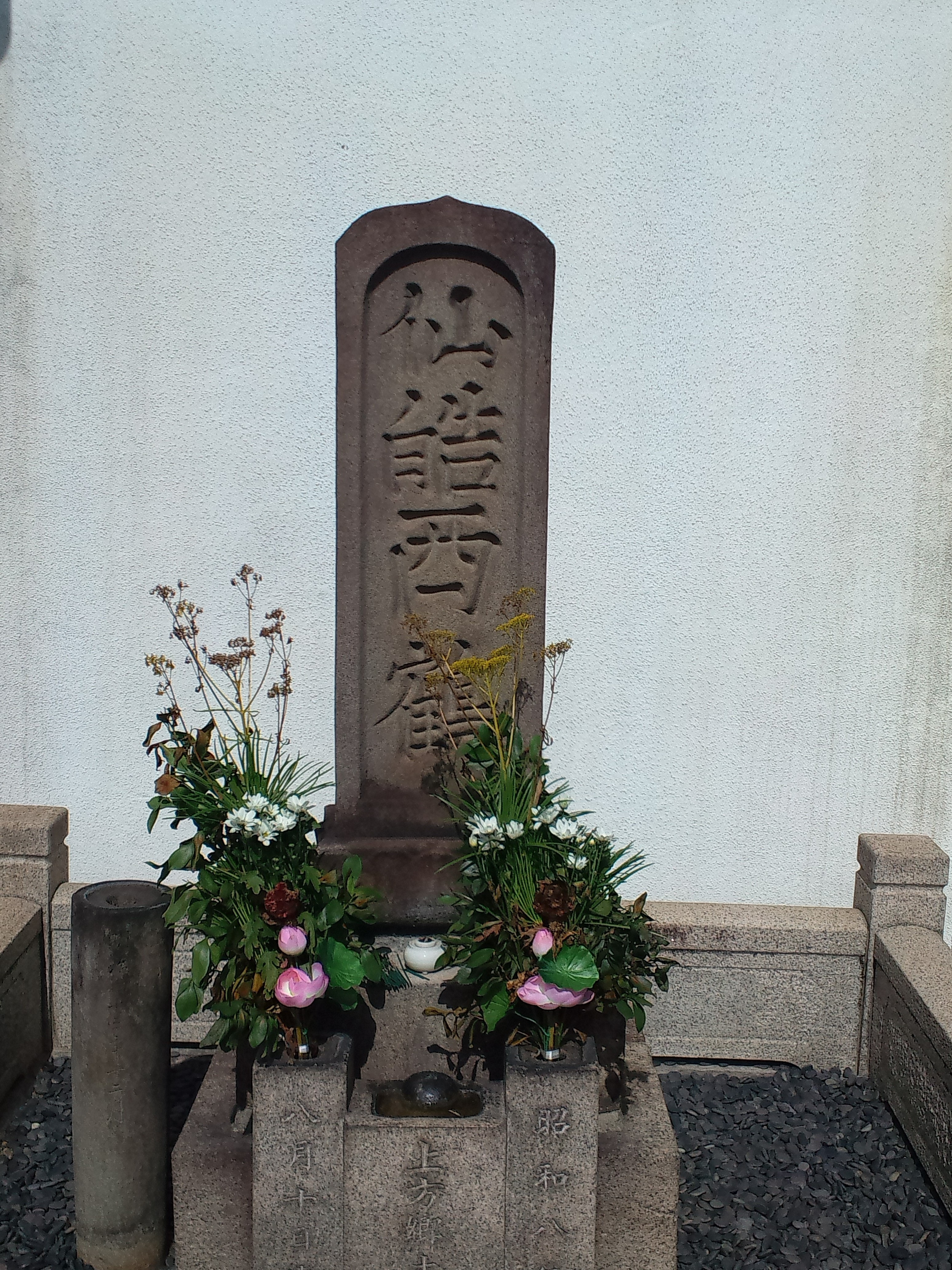
Tomb of Ihara Saikaku, in Seigan temple, Osaka.

=== Amorous or erotic stories ===
- The Life of an Amorous Man (好色一代男, Kōshoku Ichidai Otoko; 1682)
- The Great Mirror of Beauties: Son of an Amorous Man (好色二代男 諸艶大鏡, Kōshoku Nidai Otoko Shoen Okagami; 1684)
- Five Women Who Loved Love (好色五人女, Kōshoku Gonin Onna; 1685)
- The Life of an Amorous Woman (好色一代女, Kōshoku Ichidai Onna; 1686) (made into the 1952 movie The Life of Oharu by Kenji Mizoguchi)
- The Great Mirror of Male Love (The Encyclopedia of Male Love) (男色大鑑, Nanshoku Okagami; 1687)

=== Townspeople (chōnin) stories ===
- Twenty Cases of Unfilial Children (本朝二十不孝, Honchō Nijū Fukō; 1686)
- The Eternal Storehouse of Japan (日本永代蔵, Nippon Eitaigura; 1688)
- Reckonings that Carry Men Through the World or This Scheming World (世間胸算用, Seken Munesan'yō; 1692)

=== Warrior stories ===
- Transmission of The Way of the Warrior (武道伝来記, Budō Denraiki; 1687)
- Tales of Samurai Honor (武家義理物語, Buke Giri Monogatari; 1688)

== Sample prose ==
"Men take their misfortunes to heart, and keep them there. A gambler does not talk about his losses; the frequenter of brothels, who finds his favorite engaged by another, pretends to be just as well off without her; the professional street-brawler is quiet about the fights he has lost; and a merchant who speculates on goods will conceal the losses he may suffer. All act as one who steps on dog dung in the dark." —Ihara Saikaku, What the Seasons Brought to the Almanac-Maker (1686)

"In view of our years of intimacy, I am deeply hurt that you should hesitate to die with me. Lest it prove to be a barrier to my salvation in the next life, I decided to include in this final testament all of the grudges against you that have accumulated in me since we first met. First: I made my way at night to your distant residence a total of 327 times over the past three years. Not once did I fail to encounter trouble of some kind. To avoid detection by patrols making their nightly rounds, I disguised myself as a servant and hid my face behind my sleeve, or hobbled along with a cane and lantern dressed like a priest. No one knows the lengths I went to in order to meet you!" —Ihara Saikaku, Love Letter Sent in a Sea Bass (1687)

== Selected translations into English ==
- de Bary, William Theodore, Five Women Who Loved Love
- Mathers, E. Powys, Comrade Loves of the Samurai (a selection of stories by Ihara translated into English via French)
- Morris, Ivan, The Life of an Amorous Woman and Other Writings
- Schalow, Paul Gordon, The Great Mirror of Male Love
- Stubbs, David C. and Takatsuka, Masanori, This Scheming World

== See also ==
- Shudo
- The Great Mirror of Male Love
- Chōnin

== Sources ==
- Encyclopædia Britannica
