= Chikashi Koizumi =

Japanese tanka poet

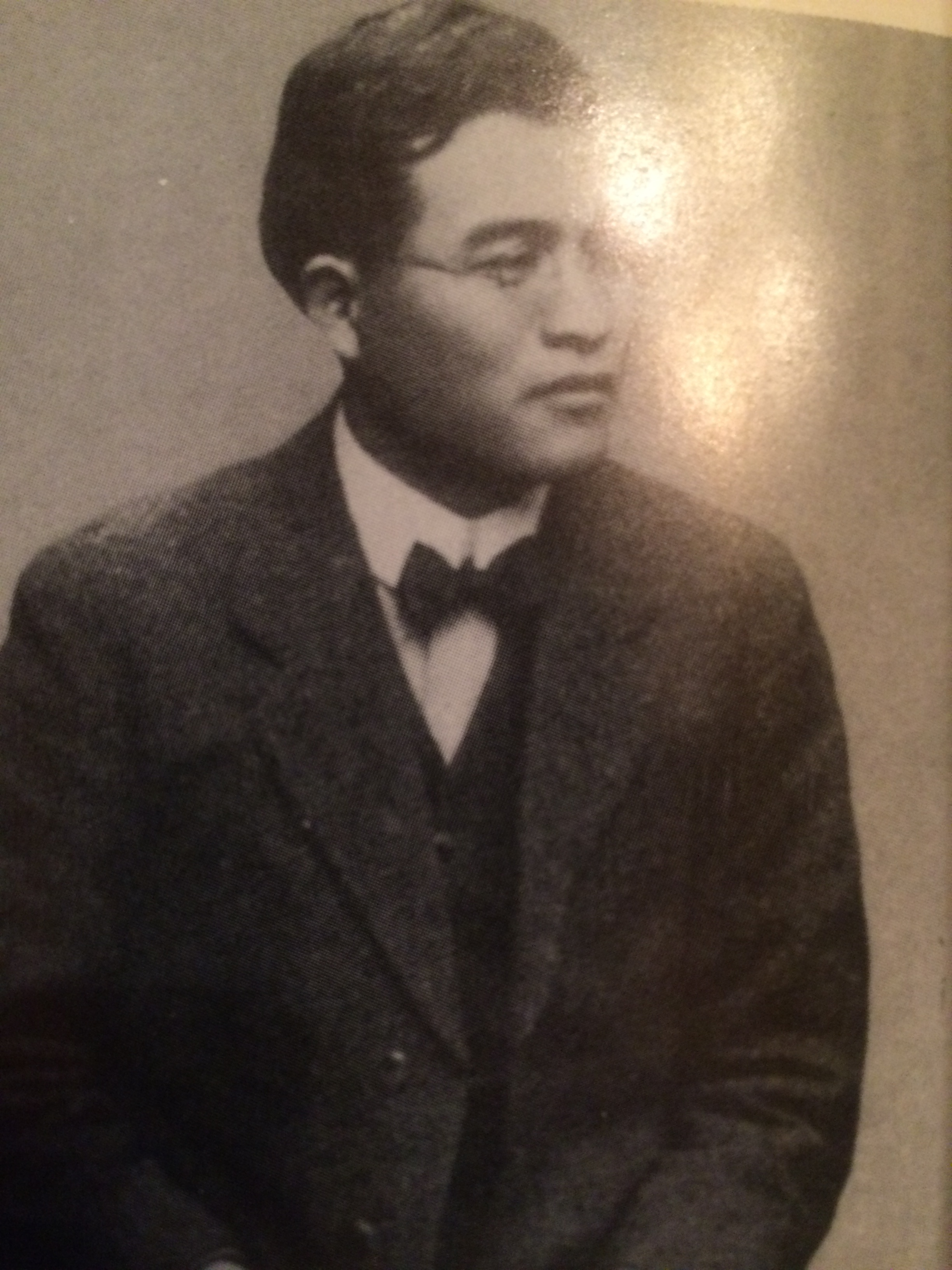
Chikashi Koizumi

Chikashi Koizumi (古泉 千樫 Koizumi Chikashi; 1886–1927) was a Japanese tanka poet. After initially working as a primary school teacher in his native Chiba Prefecture, he moved to Tokyo and became a full-time poet. He published in several prestigious poetry magazines, even helping to found both Araragi and Nikkō, before setting up his own poetic society, the Aogaki-kai, and taking on disciples. He died before the society's organ could see print.

== Biography ==
Chikashi Koizumi was born on 26 September 1886. He was born in Yoshio Village, Awa District (modern-day Kamogawa City), Chiba Prefecture.

His real name was Ikutarō Koizumi (古泉 幾太郎 Koizumi Ikutarō), and he also used the pseudonyms Kosai (沽哉), Suinansō-shunin (椎南荘主人) and Minooka-rōjin (蓑岡老人).

He graduated the Chiba Prefecture Teachers' Training Centre (千葉県教員講習所 Chiba-ken Kyōin Kōshū-sho), and for a time worked as a primary school teacher, before resigning in 1908 and moving to Tokyo.

He died on 11 August 1927.

== Writings ==
Koizumi published many of his early tanka poems in the Tokyo daily newspaper Yorozu Chōhō. When he was 17 he published a poem in Kokoro no Hana, and then in the tanka journal Ashibi (馬酔木).

He was a disciple of Itō Sachio. After moving to Tokyo in 1908, he helped found the important poetry magazine Araragi. He had a close working relationship with the poet Saitō Mokichi. In 1913 he co-authored Bareisho no Hana (馬鈴薯の花) with Kenkichi Nakamura.

In 1924, he joined Yūgure Maeda, Hakushū Kitahara, Toshiharu Kinoshita, Zenmaro Toki and others in forming a group to publish a new literary magazine, Nikkō, which was to be purely devoted to Modernism. The following year, he published a personal anthology, Kawa no Hotori (川のほとり). Other collections of his poetry include Okujō no Tsuchi (屋上の土), Seigyū-shū (青牛集), and Teibon Koizumi Chikashi Zenkashū (定本古泉千樫全歌集).

In 1926 he founded the Aogaki-kai (青垣会) and took on students, but before their poetry journal Aogaki could enter publication Koizumi himself died.

== Works cited ==
- Keene, Donald (1999) [1984]. A History of Japanese Literature, Vol. 4: Dawn to the West – Japanese Literature of the Modern Era (Poetry, Drama, Criticism) (paperback ed.). New York, NY: Columbia University Press. ISBN 978-0-231-11435-6.
- Motobayashi, Katsuo (2001). "Koizumi Chikashi" 古泉千樫. Encyclopedia Nipponica (in Japanese). Shogakukan.
- "Koizumi Chikashi" 古泉千樫. 20-Seiki Nihon Jinmei Jiten (in Japanese). Nichigai Associates. 2004.
