= Gogyōka =

Japanese poetry form

Gogyohka (Japanese: 五行歌) is a five-line, untitled, Japanese poetic form. Unlike tanka (57577 syllables), Gogyohka has no restrictions on line length.

Poets such as Kenji Miyazawa, Jun Ishiwara, Yūgure Maeda, Hakushu Kitahara, Toson Yashiro and Shinobu Orikuchi have written five-line poetry as free-style tankas since the Taishō period around the 1910s. However, they did not name the form.

In 1983, Enta Kusakabe named it Gogyohka (五行歌) and for the first time laid out the five rules of five-line poetry. He trademarked Gogyohka in Japan. The form of English Gogyohka is the same as that of free English tanka because both are untitled and are written in five free lines. As of 2018, at least five Gogyohka magazines existed: Gogyohka, Hamakaze, Minami no kaze, Sai and Kojimachi club.

== Five rules ==
Five rules of Gogyohka by Enta Kusakabe (1983).

- Gogyohka is a new form of short poem that is based on the ancient Japanese Tanka and Kodai kayo.
- Gogyohka has five lines, but exceptionally may have four or six.
- Each line of Gogyohka consists of one phrase with a line-break after each phrase or breath.
- Gogyohka has no restraint on numbers of words or syllables.
- The theme of Gogyohka is unrestricted.

== Sources ==
- Enta Kusakabe, Gogyōka o hajimeru hito no tameni, Shisei-sha(1997),ISBN 978-4882080329
- Enta Kusakabe, Matthew Lane, Gogyohka (Five-line Poetry), Shisei-sha (2006),ISBN 978-4882080817
- Peter Fiore, text messages: American Gogyohka Poetry, Mushroom Press(2009). ISBN 978-0615297880
- José Luis Vázquez (Author), Janeth Carolina Piña Alpuche (Editor), Editorial Dreamers(2016)
- Cat Ellington, Memoirs in Gogyohka: A Book of Short Poems and Memoirs, Quill Pen Ink Publishing (2019),ISBN 978-1733442121

== See also ==
- Japanese poetry
- Cinquain
- Limerick (poetry)
- Waka
