= Shintaishi =

Japanese poetry style

Shintaishi (新体詩) is a type of Japanese poetry. It specifically refers to poems written in classical Japanese in non-traditional forms (as opposed to the 5-7-5-7-7 waka and the 5-7-5 haiku) in the Meiji period. Notable practitioners of the form included Yuasa Banketsu and Ochiai Naobumi. It declined in popularity in the first two decades of the twentieth century, in favour of free-form poetry in a more vernacular form of Japanese.

== Etymology ==
Shintaishi (literally "new form poetry") has its origins in the Meiji period. It refers to poetry with a fixed form and written in classical Japanese. Early Japanese bilingual dictionaries of French and English generally translated the words poème and poem as shi (詩), but in the early Meiji period this word almost exclusively referred to kanshi (poetry in Classical Chinese). Toyama Masakazu and Ryōkichi Yatabe, as well as Inoue Tetsujirō in his preface to a verse by Longfellow, expressed the necessity that Meiji poetry be written in a new form unlike the classical styles of Japanese poetry. The word shintaishi is modeled on kotaishi ("old form poetry", the Japanese name for gushi) and kintaishi ("modern form poetry", the Japanese pronunciation of jintishi).

== Content ==
Shintaishi were meant to express emotions, concepts and so on that were seen as too "modern" to be addressed in traditional poetic forms such as haiku and waka.

== Examples ==
Early works in the shintaishi form include those included in Takeuchi Setsu's edited volume Shintai-shiika (新体詩歌) and Yamada Bimyō's edited volume Shintaishi-sen (新体詞選), both of which became bestsellers. Yuasa Banketsu's "Jūni no ishizuka" and Ochiai Naobumi's White Aster are usually taken as early representative examples of the form.

== Rise and fall ==
The form reached its zenith of popularity at the turn of the twentieth century, specifically the "Meiji 30s", or 1897 to 1906, in Japanese historiographic terms. In the following decade, however, under the influence of Naturalism and the vernacular free-form poetry movement (口語自由詩運動), it saw a decline and effectively disappeared.

== Works cited ==
- Keene, Donald (1999) [1984]. A History of Japanese Literature, Vol. 4: Dawn to the West – Japanese Literature of the Modern Era (Poetry, Drama, Criticism) (paperback ed.). New York, NY: Columbia University Press. ISBN 978-0-231-11435-6.
- Chiba, Sen'ichi (2001). "Shintaishi" 新体詩. Encyclopedia Nipponica (in Japanese). Shogakukan.
