= Utsubo Kubota =

- 窪田 空穂
- Born: June 8, 1877; Wada Village, Higashichikuma District, Nagano Prefecture, Japan
- Died: April 12, 1967 (aged 89)
- Occupation: poet
- Writing career
- Genre: tanka poetry
- Literary movement: Naturalism

Utsubo Kubota (窪田 空穂 Kubota Utsubo; 1877–1967) was a Japanese tanka poet. He also wrote poetry in other forms, as well as prose fiction and non-fiction critical and scholarly works on Japanese classical literature. He was a lecturer at Waseda University.

== Biography ==
Utsubo Kubota was born on 8 June 1877. He was born in Wada Village, Higashichikuma District (modern-day Matsumoto City), Nagano Prefecture. His real name was Tsūji Kubota (窪田 通治 Kubota Tsūji).

He graduated the School of Letters at the Tōkyō Senmon Gakkō (present-day Waseda University). After working as a reporter for various newspapers and magazines, he returned to Waseda to become a lecturer on literature.

He died on 12 April 1967.

== Writings ==
Kubota was a leading poet of the Japanese Naturalist school. He wrote many tanka, as well as poems of other forms such as the chōka.

He first came to the attention of the poet Tekkan Yosano for a tanka he published in the magazine Bunko in 1900. Early in his literary career he published shintaishi (poetry in modern forms) and tanka in Tekkan's important magazine Myōjō, but left after less than a year.

In 1905 he published the anthology Mahiruno (まひる野). It was also around this time that he took an interest in the philosophy of Naturalism and began writing prose fiction, researching classical Japanese literature, and engaging in literary criticism.

1911 saw the publication of his short story collection Rohen (炉辺).

In 1912 he published Utsubo Kashū (空穂歌集), with the intention of distancing himself from tanka, but he continued to write them throughout his career.

== Reception ==
Literary historian and critic Donald Keene wrote of Kubota that he "attained his greatest distinction as a poet relatively late in life", contrasting him in this sense to the poets associated with the magazine Myōjō. He went on to note that "[Kubota's] poetry often has a perfection of diction that defies translation, though his themes and imagery are less compelling" than other Naturalist poets.

== Works cited ==
- Keene, Donald (1999) [1984]. A History of Japanese Literature, Vol. 4: Dawn to the West – Japanese Literature of the Modern Era (Poetry, Drama, Criticism) (paperback ed.). New York, NY: Columbia University Press. ISBN 978-0-231-11435-6.
- Mukawa, Chūichi (1994). "Kubota Utsubo" 窪田空穂. Encyclopedia Nipponica (in Japanese). Shogakukan.
