= Osaburo Noguchi =

Executed Japanese murderer and suspected serial killer (1880-1908)

- 野口 男三郎
- Born: Osaburo Takebayashi; 1880; Osaka, Empire of Japan
- Died: July 2, 1908 (aged 27–28); Ichigaya Prison, Tokyo, Empire of Japan
- Cause of death: Execution by hanging
- Convictions: Murder; Forgery
- Penalty: Death

Details
- Victims: 1–3
- Span of crimes: 1902–1905
- Country: Japan
- State: Tokyo
- Date apprehended: May 29, 1905

Osaburo Noguchi (野口 男三郎, Noguchi Osaburō; né Takebayashi; 1880 – July 2, 1908) was a Japanese murderer and suspected serial killer who was convicted of killing a drug store owner in 1905 and was the prime suspect in two other murders dating back to 1902. Sentenced to death for the only murder he was convicted of, he was subsequently hanged at Ichigaya Prison.

== Early life ==
Osaburo Takebayashi was born in Osaka in 1880, the third son of industrialist Yutachibana Takebayashi. At a young age, he was sent to study at the prestigious Anglican private "Higher English School", and in April 1886, with the help of fellow alumnus Teizo Mataki and his mother Kiku, he moved to Tokyo, boarding at Ishikawa Chiyomatsu's house. It was said that his witty and meek personality earned him a high degree of trust from both his family and members of the boarding school staff. Circa September 1899, he had enrolled to study Russian at the Tokyo University of Foreign Languages.

Takebayashi was well-liked by neighbors, particularly by a woman named Sae, the sister of classical Chinese poet Neisai Noguchi. The two began dating, and Sae eventually managed to convince her brother to allow Takebayashi to move in with them in 1901. In July 1904, the couple had their first daughter, Kimiko. He would eventually change his surname to Noguchi, in order to honor his new relatives.

When he was arrested later, police interviewed Masujiro Honda, a missionary from St. Paul's Church in Tokyo who had been Noguchi's high school teacher. According to Honda, his student frequently complained of a poor memory and often skipped classes, and based on his recommendation, Noguchi enrolled at the Kodokan Judo Institute to improve his health. While he was considered very kind and pleasant towards a certain few, many considered him overly selfish and weak, and was unpopular amongst fellow students. For this reason, he was sent to Chiyomatsu's boarding house, where he would have him study giant salamanders.

=== Murder of Sosuke Kawai ===
Despite moving in his brother-in-law's house, Osaburo and Neisai's relationship was not good, as the former suspected that the latter did not trust him. Neisai, who suffered from leprosy, had to be treated constantly by Sae, which aroused fears in Osaburo that she might get infected as well. This, coupled with his desire to improve his relationship with his brother-in-law, prompted Noguchi to seek a cure for the disease. A contemporary superstition said that human flesh was an effective treatment for leprosy, with Noguchi deciding to kill a child in the neighborhood, harvest his flesh and give it to Neisai.

On March 27, 1902, after 10 PM, Noguchi accosted from behind 11-year-old Sosuke Kawai, who was on his way home from purchasing sugar, and then strangled him. He then dragged the body to a nearby vacant lot, took out a sword and stabbed the body in the face, before making a 18 cm incision on both buttocks. Noguchi then began stripping muscle tissue from the buttocks, which lasted roughly a minute. After collecting it, he then gouged out his victim's eyeballs using his fingers, before fleeing the scene.

Two days later, he bought a ceramic pot and a crucible at a store in Kinrokucho, then rented a rowing boat from a boat rental shop in Kobiko-cho, in the Kyobashi Ward. Noguchi then sailed out at sea, not far from the Hama-rikyū Gardens, where he ignited a fire with charcoal he had prepared beforehand, and boiled the muscle tissues. After returning to shore, he went to a shop in Hitotsugi and bought some chicken soup, in which he mixed the tissues and then gave it to his brother-in-law.

=== Diploma forgery ===
Around September 1902, Noguchi was forced to drop out from the Tokyo University of Foreign Studies after he had repeatedly failed his exams, but continued to claim to his wife that he was still studying there. In August 1903, he got a diploma paper from the Meiji Chamber of Commerce, and later had it forged to appear that he had earned a PhD in literature, as well as a diploma in German and economics. On September 1, he presented these forged diplomas and other documents to Neisai, and later sent them to his parents' house in Osaka.

=== Murder of Neisai Noguchi ===
In July 1904, Sae gave birth to the couple's first daughter, Kimiko. However, around December of that year, a dispute arose over a prenuptial agreement that stipulated restrictions on property disposal concerning Noguchi living with his brother-in-law, and so, he left the family.

On May 3, 1905, Noguchi, who had been living intermittently at acquaintances' houses, hoped to reunite with his common-law wife, but she sent him a letter that their daughter was now under custody of her brother, who loathed Osaburo. After careful consideration, Noguchi came to the conclusion that he would have to kill Neisai. He bought strychnine capsules at a pharmacy in Sanbacho and attempted to convince his wife to give them to her brother, pretending it was medicine, but failed. On May 11, around 11 PM, after making sure that other family members were sleeping, Noguchi went into the house and snuck into Neisai's bedroom. He then stuffed the capsule down his throat, and choked his incapacitated brother-in-law until he succumbed.

=== Murder of Tomigoro Tsuzuki ===
Following his brother-in-law's death, Noguchi begged his relatives to be accepted back into the family, but they categorically refused. Thinking that his lack of employment was a hindrance, Noguchi, fraudulently presenting himself as an interpreter for the family, attempted to travel to Manchuria. His lack of funds prevented him doing so, however, and he thusly approached Tomigoro Tsuzuki, a local drug store owner. Pretending to be deaf, Noguchi convinced the man to buy into a fictitious investment plan, and arranged to meet him at another location to discuss the details further.

On May 14, 1905, at around 2 PM, Tsuzuki withdrew a deposit of 350 yen from the bank account of his business partner and returned home. Three hours later, he was called by Noguchi to go to Yoyogi via the Tokyo Toden tram network. When he arrived, Noguchi lunged at him and strangled him to death. He then dumped the dead man's body in the nearby forest, where it was found not long after.

== Arrest and confessions ==
Soon after the discovery of Tsuzuki's corpse, officers from the Kojimachi Police Station immediately turned towards Osaburo Noguchi as a prime suspect, as he was known to frequent the drug stores in the area. Further inquiries also put him as a possible suspect in the brutal killing of Kawai three years ago, and due to this, he was arrested near Iidamachi Station on May 29, 1905. Following his arrest, they considered that he might also be responsible for the mysterious death of his brother-in-law.

Noguchi himself later admitted to all three murders and forging his diploma, all of which were used at his upcoming trial before the Tokyo District Court.

=== Trial, imprisonment and execution ===
On May 15, 1906, Osaburo Noguchi was convicted of the robbery-murder of Tomigoro Tsuzuki and forgery relating to his diploma, but acquitted in the other two murders due to lack of evidence. The later accomplishment was made thanks to his lawyer Takuzo Hanai, who convinced the judges that the police had likely tortured him into confessing, backed by him pointing out logical discrepancies in the confessions and testimonies provided by family members.

Noguchi was later sent to death row to await execution, where he proved to be unpopular with most other inmates, but had a brief correspondence with anarchist writer Ōsugi Sakae, who was visiting comrades in prison. On July 2, 1908, he was hanged at Ichigaya Prison.

== Aftermath ==
Contemporary newspapers wrote about the sensational murder of Kawai almost every day, which later resulted in Noguchi writing a poem and an enka parody of the popular song Beautiful Nature. The song, named "Osaburo no Uta", proved popular with the contemporary public.

In 1906, author Doppo Kunikida, who had been experiencing financial difficulties, published a confession letter written by Noguchi, describing how he had committed the crimes. Poet Utsubo Kubota later sold a similar letter to a colleague, which was later published in a newspaper.

== See also ==
- Capital punishment in Japan
- List of incidents of cannibalism

== Bibliography ==
- Tokuya Kojima (1934). 明治以降大事件の真相と判例 [The truth and precedents of major incidents since the Meiji Era] (in Japanese).
- Kogai Tanaka (1935). 猟奇医話 [Bizarre medical stories] (in Japanese).
- Hisako Kuroiwa (2007). 編集者国木田独步の時代 [Editor Doppo Kunikida's Era] (in Japanese). Kadokawa Sensho.
