= White Aster =

White aster is the common name of several species of plants formerly classified in Aster:

- White heath aster, Symphyotrichum ericoides (Formerly Aster ericoides)
  This is the species most commonly referred to as "white aster"
- Upland white aster, Solidago ptarmicoides (Formerly Aster ptarmicoides)
- Flat-topped white aster, Doellingeria umbellata (Formerly Aster umbellatus)
- Small white aster, Symphyotrichum racemosum (Formerly Aster racemosus)
  Frequently confused in cultivation (as Aster ericoides) with S. ericoides.
- White wood aster, Eurybia divaricata (Formerly Aster divaricatus)
- Tall or panicled white aster, Symphyotrichum lanceolatum (Formerly Aster lanceolatus)

== See also ==
- White Aster (Japanese poem)
