= Yūgure Maeda =

- 前田 夕暮
- Born: June 8, 1877; Minamiyana Village, Ōsumi District (modern-day Hadano City), Kanagawa Prefecture, Japan
- Died: April 12, 1967 (aged 89)
- Occupation: poet
- Writing career
- Genre: tanka poetry
- Literary movement: Naturalism

Yūgure Maeda (前田 夕暮 Maeda Yūgure; 1883–1951) was a Japanese tanka poet.

== Biography ==
Yūgure Maeda was born on 27 July 1883. He was born in Minamiyana Village, Ōsumi District (modern-day Hadano City), Kanagawa Prefecture. His real name was Yōzō Maeda (前田 洋造 Maeda Yōzō).

He dropped out of middle school without graduating. In 1904 he moved to Tokyo and became a student of the tanka poet Saishū Onoe.

He was noted as a representative poet of naturalism along with Bokusui Wakayama. He painted an era called the "Yugure / Bokusui era" in the history of literature. He founded Hakujitsu and published the tanka magazine "Poetry" every month. Rofu Miki, Bochō Yamamura, Mokichi Saito, Saisei Murou, Sakutaro Hagiwara, Kotaro Takamura and other poets and poets were given a place to play an active role and raised many poets. He contributed to the publication of the magazine "Nikko" and published many colloquial tanka and prose. He has never lived in Hadano again since he moved to Tokyo, but he loved Hadano deeply and wrote a lot about the scenery of his hometown and Tanzawa.

He died on 20 April 1951.

== Writings ==
Most of Maeda's early tanka compositions were submitted to a variety of literary magazines and were rejected without a second word. He was encouraged by Saishū Onoe, writer of a poetry column for the periodical Shinsei (新声), to keep up his efforts, however. Maeda and Bokusui Wakayama were among the first poets to join Onoe's Shazensō-sha (車前草社) when it was founded in 1905.

The poets of the Shazensō-sha were insistent of simplicity and clarity of expression, in opposition to the poets associated with important magazine Myōjō. Maeda was one of the most critical of what he saw as the excessive romanticism of the Myōjō poets.

In 1906, Maeda founded his own poetic society, the Hakujitsu-sha (白日社).

In 1924, he was joined by Hakushū Kitahara, Toshiharu Kinoshita, Chikashi Koizumi, Zenmaro Toki and others in forming a group to publish a new literary magazine, Nikkō, which was to be purely devoted to Modernism. He took his first aeroplane ride in 1929, inspiring him to write in a more colloquial fashion — he felt the experience could not be described in traditional language. He continued to write unconventional tanka for fifteen years after this.

Maeda was an exceptionally prolific poet, and more than 40,000 of his tanka survive, but he published very little of this during his lifetime.

Typical poetry 「木に花さき 君わが妻と ならむ日の 四月なかなか とほくもあるかな (Kinihanaskai kimiwagatumato naranhino shigatunakanaka to-kumoarukana)」 「はらしろき 巨口の魚を 背におひて しほかはくちを いゆくわかもの (Harashiroki kyokounouowo senioite shiokawakuchiwo iyukuwakamono)」 「出水川 あから濁りて ながれたり つちより虹は わきたちにけり (Demizugawa akaranigorite nagaretari tuchiyorinijiha wakitachinikeri)」 「すくすくと ゆふ空をさす ねぎのはな 傘さしてみる そのふとねぎを (Sukusukuto yu-zorawosasu neginohana kasasashitemiru sonohutonegiwo)」

== Monument ==
Maeda Yugure Birth Monument-It is quietly built in 2134 Minamiyana, Hadano City, Kanagawa Prefecture. In addition, there are 11 Maeda poems and monuments built in the city, such as "Sakuradote Kofun Park". The city holds the "Yugure Memorial Children's Tanka Tournament" every year.

== Reception ==
Literary historian and critic Donald Keene compared Kubota's poetry to that of Akiko Yosano, ironically one of the targets of Maeda's criticism.

== Works cited ==
- Ishimoto, Ryūichi (2001). "Maeda Yūgure" 前田夕暮. Encyclopedia Nipponica (in Japanese). Shogakukan.
- Keene, Donald (1999) [1984]. A History of Japanese Literature, Vol. 4: Dawn to the West – Japanese Literature of the Modern Era (Poetry, Drama, Criticism) (paperback ed.). New York, NY: Columbia University Press. ISBN 978-0-231-11435-6.
- "Maeda Yūgure" 前田夕暮. Nihon Jinmei Daijiten Plus (in Japanese). Kodansha. 2015.
- "Maeda Yūgure" 前田夕暮. World Encyclopedia (in Japanese). Heibonsha. 1998.
