= Gogyōshi =

Style of Japanese poetry

Gogyoshi (五行詩) is a style of Japanese poem that consists of a title and five lines. Japanese poet Tekkan Yosano published the original form of gogyoshi with specific syllable counts for each line in 1910, but few poets wrote in the style. In the 2000s, some Japanese poets began writing modern gogyoshi without syllabic restrictions, and modern gogyoshi have since been defined only by having five lines. Therefore, gogyoshi is considered the freest of Japanese poetic forms, as the poems do not have syllabic restrictions, specific line breaks, or a rhyme scheme. However, the style differs from other five-line forms, such as tanka and gogyohka, by the titling of its poems. Mariko Sumikura used gogyoshi as an English word for the first time in 2009. In 2018, Tarō Aizu proposed World Gogyoshi, which is written in two languages, English and each mother tongue, and he has been publishing the anthology of World Gogyoshi every year.

== World Gogyoshi ==
World Gogyoshi has seven rules by Taro Aizu.(December 25, 2019)

- 1. World Gogyoshi is based on Japanese Gogyoshi and English Pentastich.
- 2. World Gogyoshi has a title and the title is written in all capital letters.
- 3. World Gogyoshi is written in only five lines.
- 4. Each line of World Gogyoshi is written as brief as possible.
- 5. World Gogyoshi is written in both English and mother tongue.
- 6. The first letter of each line is written in a capital letter.
- 7. The purpose of World Gogyoshi is World Friendship.

== Sources ==
- Mariko Sumikura, Yume tsumugu hito, Chikurinkan (2009), ISBN 978-4-86000-169-8 C0092
- Mariko Sumikura, Ai matou hito, Chikurinkan (2010), ISBN 978-4-86000-195-7 C0092
- Mariko Sumikura Hikari Oru Hito, Chikurinkan (2010), ISBN 978-4-86000-188-9 C0092
- Mariko Sumikura, Tsuchi daku masurao, Chikurinkan (2011), ISBN 978-4860002114
- Kaoru Tanaka, Fragrant Winds, Kunpuan(2009)
- Taro Aizu, The Lovely Earth, Lulu Press(2011), ISBN 978-1-257-83916-2
- Taro Aizu, La Terre Précieuse, Lulu Press(2011), ISBN 978-1-257-90090-9
- Taro Aizu,わが福島 My Fukushima Mon Fukushima, Fueisya (2014), ISBN 978-4434191862
- Steve Wilkinson, Ripples on the Pond: a tanshi collection, CreateSpace Independent Publishing Platform(2015), ISBN 978-1515183013
- Steve Wilkinson, The Bamboo Hut Autumn 2015: A journal of tanshi, CreateSpace Independent Publishing Platform (2015), ISBN 978-1517236106
- Atunis Galaxy Anthology – 2018
- Taro Aizu, Sigma Sathish, Niladri Mahajan, The First Anthology of World Gogyoshi 2019, Independently published (April, 2019)ISBN 978-1092712026
- Taro Aizu, The Second Anthology Of World Gogyoshi 2020, Independently published (December, 2019)ISBN 978-1678301132
- Taro Aizu, The Third Anthology Of World Gogyoshi 2021, Independently published (December, 2020)ISBN 979-8587268999
- Taro Aizu, The Fourth Anthology of World Gogyoshi 2022, Poetry Planet Book Publishing House(January,2022)ISBN 978-6214701681
- Taro Aizu, 世界五行詩集 いとしい地球よ3 World Gogyoshi The Lovely Earth 3 Yubunsya, 2022 ISBN 978-4910433318
- Taro Aizu, The Fifth Anthology of World Gogyoshi 2023, Poetry Planet Book Publishing House(December,2022)ISBN 978-6214704248
- Taro Aizu, What's World Gogyoshi?The Guideline for World Gogyoshi, Poetry Planet Book Publishing House(September,2023)ISBN 978-6214707072
- Taro Aizu, The Sixth Anthology of World Gogyoshi 2024, Poetry Planet Book Publishing House(July 2024)ISBN 978-6214951369
- Taro Aizu, The 7th Anthology of World Gogyoshi 2025, Poetry Planet Book Publishing House(August 2025)ISBN 978-6214955220

== See also ==
- Japanese poetry
- Cinquain
- Limerick (poetry)
