= Tetsugaku-jii =

Japanese glossary

Tetsugaku Jii (Japanese: 哲学字彙, Hepburn: Tetsugakujii; lit. 'Philosophical Dictionary') was a Japanese glossary of academic terminology first published and compiled by Inoue Tetsujirō in 1881. Revised and expanded editions were later published under the titles Kaitei Zōho Tetsugaku Jii (改訂増補 哲学字彙, Kaiteizōho Tetsugakujii; lit. 'Revised and Expanded Philosophical Dictionary') and Ei-Doku-Futsu-Wa Tetsugaku Jii (英独仏和 哲学字彙, Eidokufutsuwa Tetsugakujii; lit. 'English-German-French-Japanese Philosophical Dictionary').

The work is regarded as an important historical source not only for the history of Japanese philosophy, but also for the broader history of modern Japanese and Sino-Japanese translated terminology. The book contributed to the widespread adoption of such terms as philosophy (哲学, tetsugaku), science (科学, kagaku), metaphysics (形而上学, keijijōgaku), religion (宗教, shūkyō), universal (普遍, fuhen), will (意志, ishi), absolute (絶対, zettai), and contract (契約, keiyaku). Its influence extended beyond Japanese to other languages, including Chinese.

== History ==
Tetsugaku Jii was compiled in order to standardize the various Sino-Japanese translated terms that had proliferated during the early Meiji period. The editors of Tetsugaku Jii insclude Inoue Tetsujirō, Wadagaki Kenzō, Kōdera Shinsaku, and Nagao Ariga, along with several unnamed collaborators. The central figure in the project was Inoue. The foundation of the work was the list of headwords in Vocabulary of Philosophy, Mental, Moral, and Metaphysical by the 19th-century British philosopher William Fleming. The first edition of Fleming’s work was published in 1857, although the specific edition used as the basis for Tetsugaku Jii is unknown. Additional headwords not found in Fleming’s dictionary were also included. The first edition of Tetsugaku Jii was published in 1881 by University of Tokyo. After the remaining copies of the first edition were exhausted, a revised and expanded edition, Kaitei Zōho Tetsugaku Jii, was published in 1884 by the Tokyo National Museum. In January 1912, Ei-Doku-Futsu-Wa Tetsugaku Jii was published by Maruzen, edited by Inoue together with Nakashima Rikizō and Motora Yūjirō. This edition was reprinted in 1921.

== Contents ==
For each headword, one or more translated terms are listed. Definitions are not provided.

The headwords are not limited to philosophy, but encompass terminology from the humanities, social sciences, and natural sciences as a whole. The total number of entries reached 1,952 in the first edition and 2,723 in the English-German-French-Japanese edition. The headwords are primarily in English, although Latin phrases and terms from other languages occasionally appear. As its title indicates, the English-German-French-Japanese Philosophical Vocabulary edition also includes equivalents in German and French. Some translated terms had already been coined by earlier scholars, while others were newly created in the work itself. In the latter case, the source or rationale for the translation was usually indicated in a note introduced by the phrase ango (“editorial note”), following the style of the classical Chinese expression “按…”. In some cases, the field of study was also indicated in parentheses after the translation.

The first edition and the revised and expanded edition included as an appendix Seikoku Onpu (“Qing Chinese Phonetic Glosses”), based on J. G. Bridgman’s Chinese Chrestomathy in the Canton Dialect. It is presumed that this appendix was used in the Meiji period to decipher transliterated proper names rendered according to Chinese pronunciation.

The revised and expanded edition also included as an appendix Bonkan Taiyaku Buppōgosū, based on E. J. Eitel’s A Sanskrit-Chinese Dictionary.

== Notable Translations from the First Edition ==
Headword	Translation(s) in Tetsugaku Jii	Current Main Translation(s)	Notes / References
Aesthetics	美妙学	美学	
Absolute	絶対、純全、専制	絶対	An editorial note is attached to 「絶対」.
Abstract	抽象、虚形、形而上	抽象	An editorial note is attached to 「形而上」.
A priori	先天	アプリオリ	Includes an editorial note.
A posteriori	後天	アポステリオリ	Includes an editorial note.
Atom	微分子	原子	
Category	範疇	範疇、カテゴリー	Includes an editorial note.
Cognition	認識	認識	
Common sense	常識	常識、コモン・センス	
Concept	概念	概念	
Constitution	憲法	憲法	
Contract	契約	契約	
Contradiction	乖角、背戻、矛盾、背馳、忤逆、枘鑿、反言対	矛盾	
Cosmos	世界	コスモス、宇宙	
Criticism	批評	批評	
Deduction	演繹法	演繹法	Includes an editorial note.
Definition	定義	定義	
Economic	家政、理財学	経済学	
Epistemology	致知学	認識論	
Ethics	倫理学	倫理学	Includes an editorial note.
Fallacy	虚偽	虚偽、誤謬	
Hallucination	幻想	幻覚	
Human nature	性、本性	人間の本性	An editorial note is attached to 「性」.
Idea	観念	観念	
Ideal	理想	理想	
Idealism	唯心論	唯心論	Includes an editorial note.
Identity	同一	同一性	
Induction	帰納法	帰納法	Includes an editorial note.
Jurisprudence	法理学	法学	
Logic	論法	論法、論理, etc.	
Materialism	唯物論	唯物論	Includes an editorial note.
Metaphysics	形而上学	形而上学	Includes an editorial note.
Miracle	霊恠、神跡	奇跡	「奇跡」 first appeared in English-German-French-Japanese Philosophical Dictionary.
Nature	本性、資質、天理、造化、宇宙、洪鈞、万有	本性、自然, etc.	
Natural philosophy	物理学	自然哲学	
Nirvana	涅槃	涅槃	Sanskrit term.
Objective	客観的	客観的	
Paradox	逆説	逆説、パラドックス	
Petitio principii	匿証佯争	論点先取	
Phenomenon	現象	現象	
Philosophy	哲学	哲学	In other headwords, it is also translated as 「理学」.
Physics	物理学	物理学	
Political philosophy	政理学	政治哲学	
Political science	政理学	政治学	
Premise	前提	前提	
Proposition	命題	命題	
Religion	宗教	宗教	
Reason	道理、理性	道理、理性, etc.	
Reasoning	推論	推論	
Revolution	革命、顚覆	革命	Includes an editorial note.
Rhetoric	修辞	修辞	
Science	理学、科学	科学	
Society	社会	社会	
Sociology	世態学	社会学	
Subjective	主観的	主観的	
Substance	本質、太極	実体	An editorial note is attached to 「太極」. 「実体」 was also assigned to several other headwords.
Trinity	三位一体	三位一体	Includes an editorial note.
Truth	真理、真実	真理、真実、真	
Universal	一統、普遍、全称	普遍、全称	
Universe	宇宙	宇宙	
Utilitarianism	功利学	功利主義	
Vernunft	理性	理性	German term.
Verstand	悟性	悟性	German term.
Virtue	徳	徳	
Will	意志	意志	
World	世界、人間、寰宇、乾坤	世界	

== See Also ==
- Zihui
- Eiwa taiyaku shūchin jisho
- Wasei-kango

== Works Referenced ==
=== Books ===
- Chen, Liwei (2001), The Formation and Development of Japanese-Created Sino-Japanese Vocabulary, Tokyo: Kyūko Shoin
- Tobita, Yoshifumi (1979), Comprehensive Index of Translated Terms in Tetsugaku Jii, Tokyo: Kasama Shoin, p. “About Tetsugaku Jii”

=== Articles ===
- Hazama, Naoki (2013), On the Historical Significance of Nakae Chōmin’s Min’yaku Yakukai: A History of the Formation of the “Modern East Asian Civilizational Sphere” — Intellectual History Section, Institute for Research in Humanities, Kyoto University, Center for Contemporary Chinese Studies
- Endō, Tomoo (1995), A Study of the Degree of Correspondence among Translation Terms in the English-Japanese Pocket Dictionary, Hyakkugaku Renkan, and Tetsugaku Jii, Japan Society for the History of English Studies
- Sanada, Haruko (2007), Inoue Tetsujirō’s Study in Europe and the Multilingual Notation in the Third Edition of Tetsugaku Jii, Saitama Gakuen University
- Zhu, Jingwei (2001), On the Additional Translated Terms in the Second and Third Editions of Tetsugaku Jii, Kokusho Kankōkai
- Zhu, Jingwei (2002), The Formation of Modern Philosophical Terminology in the Meiji Period: An Examination through Philosophical Dictionaries, National Institute for Japanese Language and Linguistics
- Sang, Bing (2013), The Origins of Modern “Chinese Philosophy”, Institute for Research in Humanities, Kyoto University, Center for Contemporary Chinese Studies
- Takano, Shigeo (2004), Japanese-Created Sino-Japanese Vocabulary in Tetsugaku Jii: Methods of Morpheme Formation and Word Coinage
- Miura, Kunio (1995), Translation Terms and Chinese Thought: Reading Tetsugaku Jii, Osaka City University

== Bibliography ==
Tetsugaku Jii: With Qing Chinese Phonetic Glosses (Japanese: 哲学字彙 附清国音符). Published by the Three Faculties of University of Tokyo, 1881 (Meiji 14). ndldm:752942

  - Tetsugaku Jii. Meicho Fukyūkai, 1980.
  - Tetsugaku Jii. Heibonsha, “Reprint Series of Modern Japanese Literature (On-Demand Edition),” vol. 241, 2015. ISBN 9784256902417
  - "Tetsugaku Jii". National Institute for Japanese Language and Linguistics; transcription by the laboratory of Okajima Akihiro, Graduate School of Letters, Osaka University. 2016.

Revised and Expanded Tetsugaku Jii (Japanese: 改訂増補 哲学字彙). Published by Tōyōkan, 1884 (Meiji 17). ndldm:994560

  - Revised and Expanded Tetsugaku Jii. Meicho Fukyūkai, 1980.
  - Revised and Expanded Tetsugaku Jii. Heibonsha, “Reprint Series of Modern Japanese Literature (On-Demand Edition),” vol. 242, 2015. ISBN 9784256902424

English-German-French-Japanese Philosophical Vocabulary (Japanese: 英独仏和 哲学字彙). Published by Maruzen, 1912 (Meiji 45). ndldm:752943

  - English-German-French-Japanese Philosophical Vocabulary. Meicho Fukyūkai, 1980.
  - English-German-French-Japanese Philosophical Vocabulary. Heibonsha, “Reprint Series of Modern Japanese Literature (On-Demand Edition),” vol. 243, 2015. ISBN 9784256902431

Tobita Yoshifumi, Comprehensive Index of Translated Terms in Tetsugaku Jii. Kasama Shoin, “Kasama Index Series,” 1979. ISBN 9784305200723 Tobita Yoshifumi and Kotoya Sayaka, Comprehensive Index of Translated Terms in the Revised and Expanded Tetsugaku Jii. Minato no Hito, 2005. ISBN 9784896291339
