= Seihaku Irako =

Japanese physician and poet (1877–1946)

Seihaku Irako (伊良子清白, Irako Seihaku, 1877–1946) was a Japanese physician and poet, known mainly for his poems in the modern waka style. Irako was born in Tottori Prefecture. His collection Kujaku-bune (The Peacock Boat), published in 1906 and 1929, is his best-known work.
