= Tatsunosuke =

- Gender: Male

Origin
- Origin: Japanese
- Meaning: Different meanings depending on the kanji used

Tatsunosuke (written: 達之助, 達之輔 or 辰之助) is a masculine Japanese given name. Notable people with the name include:

- Tatsunosuke Hori (堀 達之助; 1823–1892), Japanese translator and writer
- Tatsunosuke Kanda (神田 辰之助; 1893–1943), Japanese shogi player
- Tatsunosuke Takasaki (高碕 達之助; 1885–1964), Japanese businessman and politician
- Tatsunosuke Yamazaki (山崎 達之輔; 1880–1948), Japanese politician
