= Suiko Sugiura =

Japanese poet

- 杉浦翠子
- Born: Midori Iwasaki; 17 May 1885 near Kawagoe, Saitama Prefecture
- Died: 16 February 1960 (aged 74)
- Other names: Sugiura Midoriko, Sugiura Suiko
- Occupations: Poet, novelist, editor
- Spouse: Hisui Sugiura
- Relatives: Momosuke Fukuzawa (brother)

Suiko Sugiura (17 May 1885 – 16 February 1960) (or 杉浦翠子 in Japanese, すぎうら すいこ in kana), born Midori Iwasaki, was a Japanese poet.

== Early life ==
Midori Iwasaki was born near Kawagoe, Saitama Prefecture, the daughter of Kiichi Iwasaki and Sada. Both of her parents died when she was a young girl; she was raised by her grandmother, and then in her older sister's household in Tokyo. She attended Joshibi University of Art and Design. One of her brothers was the businessman Momosuke Fukuzawa.

== Career ==
Sugiura was a poet in Tokyo, in the tanka style (short poems). She was involved in the Araragi school of poets associated with the magazine of that name. She published several collections of her work, and launched a monthly poetry magazine in 1933; one poet she promoted was Shinoe Shōda. She also published at least two novels. She also collaborated with her artist husband on some projects.

== Publications ==
- Sōsaku kanashiki utabito no mure (1927)
- Asa no kokyū (1928)

== Personal life ==
In 1904 Iwasaki married artist Hisui Sugiura. She died in 1960, at the age of 74. Photographs, portraits, letters, and other materials related to Sugiura were included in "Sugiura Hisui: Epoch-making Modern Design", a 2021 exhibit about her husband at the Tobacco and Salt Museum in Tokyo, also shown in 2022 at the Shizuoka City Museum of Art.
