= Nobutsuna Sasaki =

Japanese tanka poet and scholar

- 佐佐木 信綱
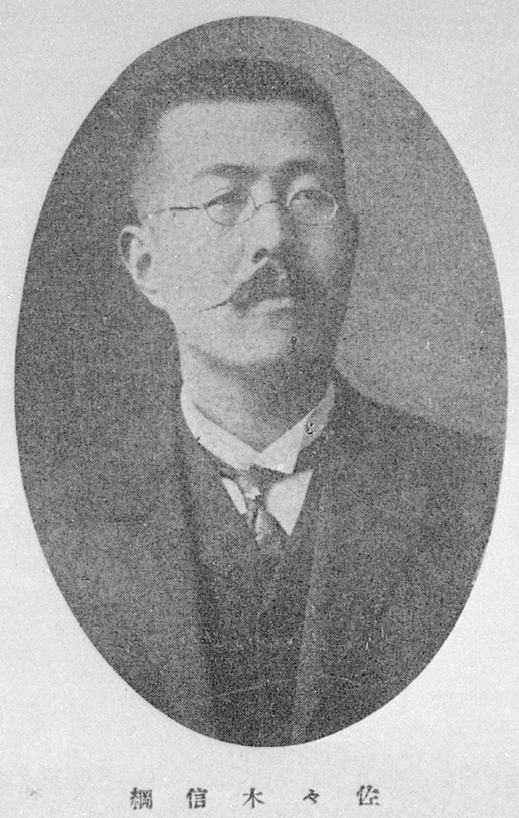
- Sasaki in the mid-1930s
- Born: 8 July 1872; Suzuka, Mie Prefecture, Japan
- Died: 2 December 1963 (aged 91); Kamakura, Kanagawa, Japan
- Resting place: Yanaka Cemetery, Tokyo
- Education: Tokyo Imperial University
- Occupations: Japanese poet and literary scholar
- Writing career
- Language: Japanese
- Genre: tanka poetry
- Notable awards: Order of Culture (1937)
- Literary movement: Chikuhakukai

Nobutsuna Sasaki (佐佐木／佐々木 信綱, Sasaki Nobutsuna; Japanese pronunciation: [sa.sa.kʲi (|) no.bɯꜜ.tsɯ.na], 8 July 1872 – 2 December 1963) was a tanka poet and scholar of the Nara and Heian periods of Japanese literature. He was active during the Shōwa period of Japan.

== Early life ==
Sasaki was born in what is now part of Suzuka city, Mie prefecture. He was considered a child prodigy, and his father, Sasaki Hirotsuna, taught him the basics of poetry composition and encouraged him to memorize classical tanka verses. After graduation from the Classics Department of Tokyo Imperial University, he followed his father's wish and decided to devote his life to waka poetry, both by researching old verses and by composing new verses himself.

== Literary career ==
In 1894 Sasaki published a lengthy patriotic poem Shina seibatsu no Uta (“The Song of the Conquest of China”), on the occasion of the start of the First Sino-Japanese War. The poem was extremely popular, and one of its lyrics comparing falling cherry blossoms to Japanese soldiers falling in battle for the emperor became a common symbolic phrase through the end of World War II. Sasaki founded a literary society called the Chikuhakukai (from his father's pen-name), which published a literary journal, Kokoro no Hana (“Flower of the Heart”) from 1898. Using the journal as a medium, he was able to popularize his own philosophy of waka, publish his research on the history and development of Japanese poetry, and to nurturing a next generation of poets. Among his many disciples were Kawada Jun, Kinoshita Rigen and Katayama Hiroko. The magazine is still in existence today as Japan's oldest poetry monthly.

In 1902, Sasaki made a visit to China, travelling up the Yangtze River and visiting Hangzhou and Suzhou.

Although some of his earliest works were influenced by Mori Ōgai, together with Masaoka Shiki and Yosano Tekkan, Sasaki took part in a movement to revolutionize tanka and brought out his first tanka anthology, Omoigusa (“Grasses of Thoughts”), in 1903. He eventually published an additional eleven collections of tanka, which included Shingetsu (“New Moon”, 1912), Toyohata gumo (“Clouds Streaming in the Wind”, 1929), and Yama to mizu to (“Mountains and Water”, 1951). In recognition of these efforts, Sasaki was offered the post of lecturer at Tokyo Imperial University in 1905, and was officially commissioned by the Ministry of Education to work on a modern commentary to the Man'yōshū . Sasaki worked together with his father on these efforts, and published a comprehensive survey of medieval waka (Wakashi no kenkyu, “Studies in Japanese Poetry”, 1915). He later led a team of scholars which published a concordance of the Man'yōshū (“Kohan Man'yōshū”, 1924–1925), which is the accepted basis for modern Man'yōshū studies.

In 1934, Sasaki was made a member of the prestigious Imperial Academy. He was the first person to be awarded the Order of Culture by the Japanese government in 1937 and also became a member of the Japan Art Academy that year. He was subsequently appointed purveyor of poetry to the Imperial Family, and a judge at the annual Utakai Hajime poetry reading contests. He was also a tutor to Empress Teimei and other members of the imperial household on the composition of poetry.

Sasaki relocated from Tokyo to Kamakura, Kanagawa prefecture in 1921, where he lived to his death in 1963. He also maintained a residence at Atami, Shizuoka, a hot spring resort further down the coast.

Sasaki's grave is at the Yanaka Cemetery, in Tokyo. Following his death, a memorial museum containing some of his manuscripts was built on the site of his former home in Suzuka city, Mie prefecture, and the summer home he maintained in Atami, Shizuoka has also been preserved by the local governments.

== See also ==
- Japanese literature
- Japanese poetry
- List of Japanese authors
