= Cinquain =

Class of poetic forms

Cinquain (/ˈsɪŋkeɪn/ SING-kayn) is a class of poetic forms that employ a 5-line pattern. Earlier used to describe any five-line form, it now refers to one of several forms that are defined by specific rules and guidelines.

== American cinquain ==
The modern form, known as American cinquain is inspired by Japanese haiku and tanka and is akin in spirit to that of the Imagists.

In her 1915 collection titled Verse, published a year after her death, Adelaide Crapsey included 28 cinquains. Crapsey's American Cinquain form developed in two stages. The first, fundamental form is a stanza of five lines of accentual verse, in which the lines comprise, in order, 1, 2, 3, 4, and 1 stresses. Then Crapsey decided to make the criterion a stanza of five lines of accentual-syllabic verse, in which the lines comprise, in order, 1, 2, 3, 4, and 1 stresses and 2, 4, 6, 8, and 2 syllables. Iambic feet were meant to be the standard for the cinquain, which made the dual criteria match perfectly. Some resource materials define classic cinquains as solely iambic, but that is not necessarily so. In contrast to the Eastern forms upon which she based them, Crapsey always titled her cinquains, effectively utilizing the title as a sixth line. Crapsey's cinquain depends on strict structure and intense physical imagery to communicate a mood or feeling.

The form is illustrated by Crapsey's "November Night":

Listen...
With faint dry sound,
Like steps of passing ghosts,
The leaves, frost-crisp'd, break from the trees
And fall.

The Scottish poet William Soutar also wrote over one hundred American cinquains (he labelled them "epigrams") between 1933 and 1940.

== Cinquain variations ==
The Crapsey cinquain has subsequently seen a number of variations by modern poets, including:

Variation	Description
Reverse cinquain	a form with one 5-line stanza in a syllabic pattern of two, eight, six, four, two.
Mirror cinquain	a form with two 5-line stanzas consisting of a cinquain followed by a reverse cinquain.
Butterfly cinquain	a nine-line syllabic form with the pattern two, four, six, eight, two, eight, six, four, two.
Crown cinquain	a sequence of five cinquain stanzas functioning to construct one larger poem.
Garland cinquain	a series of six cinquains in which the last is formed of lines from the preceding five, typically line one from stanza one, line two from stanza two, and so on.

== Didactic cinquain ==
The didactic cinquain is closely related to the Crapsey cinquain. It is an informal cinquain widely taught in elementary schools and has been featured in, and popularized by, children's media resources, including Junie B. Jones and PBS Kids. This form is also embraced by young adults and older poets for its expressive simplicity. The prescriptions of this type of cinquain refer to word count, not syllables and stresses. Ordinarily, the first line is a one-word title, the subject of the poem; the second line is a pair of adjectives describing that title; the third line is a three-word phrase that gives more information about the subject (often a list of three gerunds); the fourth line consists of four words describing feelings related to that subject; and the fifth line is a single word synonym or other reference for the subject from line one.
For example:

Snow
Silent, white
Dancing, falling, drifting
Covering everything it touches
Blanket

== Other cinquains ==
Form	Description
Tetractys	is a five-line poem of 20 syllables with a title, arranged in the following order: 1, 2, 3, 4, 10, with each line standing as a phrase on its own. It can be inverted, doubled, etc. and was created by English poet Ray Stebbings.
Lanterne	is an untitled five-line quintain verse with a syllabic pattern of 1, 2, 3, 4, 1. Each line is usually able to stand on its own.

== See also ==
- Quintain (poetry)
- Elevenie
- Gogyōshi
- Poetry
