= Lanterne (poem) =

A lanterne is a cinquain form of poetry, in which the first line has one syllable and each subsequent line increases in length by one syllable, except for the final line that concludes the poem with one syllable. Its name derives from the lantern shape that appears when the poem is aligned to the center of the page.

Each line of the lanterne is able to stand on its own, and while the poem may or may not be given a title, the title of a lanterne sometimes functions as an integral part of the poem, working as a 'sixth' line.

== See also ==
Concrete Poetry / i.e. Shape poems
