= Elevenie =

An elevenie (German Elfchen – Elf "eleven" and -chen as diminutive suffix to indicate diminutive size and endearment) is a short poem with a given pattern. It contains eleven words which are arranged in a specified order over five rows. Each row has a requirement that can vary.

== Structure ==
The typical structure of an elevenie is as follows:

Row	Words	Content
1	1	A thought, an object, a colour, a smell or the like
2	2	What does the word from the first row do?
3	3	Where or how is the word of row 1?
4	4	What do you mean?
5	1	Conclusion: What results from all this? What is the outcome?

== Use in education ==
The elevenie is mostly taught in primary school, but also in secondary school as well as in language teaching, including German as a Second Language, and religious education. The pedagogical objective of the elevenie is to develop creativity and communication through writing poetry, and for best results it is taught in a playful, interactive way. It is also used as an alternative to brainstorming to introduce a new topic or facilitate discussion.

== Examples ==
Spätsommer
Goldenes Licht
Sonne verströmt Wärme
Fülle der Früchte lockt
Dankbarkeit

Reife
Sommerliches Nachklingen
Herbst naht unaufhaltsam
Mein Leben schwingt mit
Öffnung

Stille
Intensives Da-Sein
Erde duftet herb
Höhepunkt des Jahres schwindet
Sehnsucht

Late-Summer
Golden light
Sun exudes warmth
Wealth of fruits tempts
Gratitude

Ripening
Summer resounds
Autumn approaches inexorably
My life hums along
Opening

Silence
Intensive presence
Earth's tart scents
The year's peak ebbs
Desire

The three elevenies together can be seen as a poem, with each elevenie a verse in the larger poem.

== Literature ==
- P. Hiebel, C. Stopfel: Elf Wörter brauchst Du nur. In: Grundschulmagazin. (3) 1998.
- I. Weigel: Motivierende Schreibanlässe im zweiten und dritten Schuljahr. In: L. Blumenstock, E. Renner (Hrsg.): Freies und angeleitetes Schreiben. 4th edition, Basel 1996.
- U. Marbot, Pfr. S. Stucki: Mit Freude schreiben – Tag für Tag. 2012. (Content: Examples of elevenies and writing guidelines)

== See also ==
- Cinquain
- Haiku
