= Inoue Tetsujirō =

Japanese philosopher, poet and educator

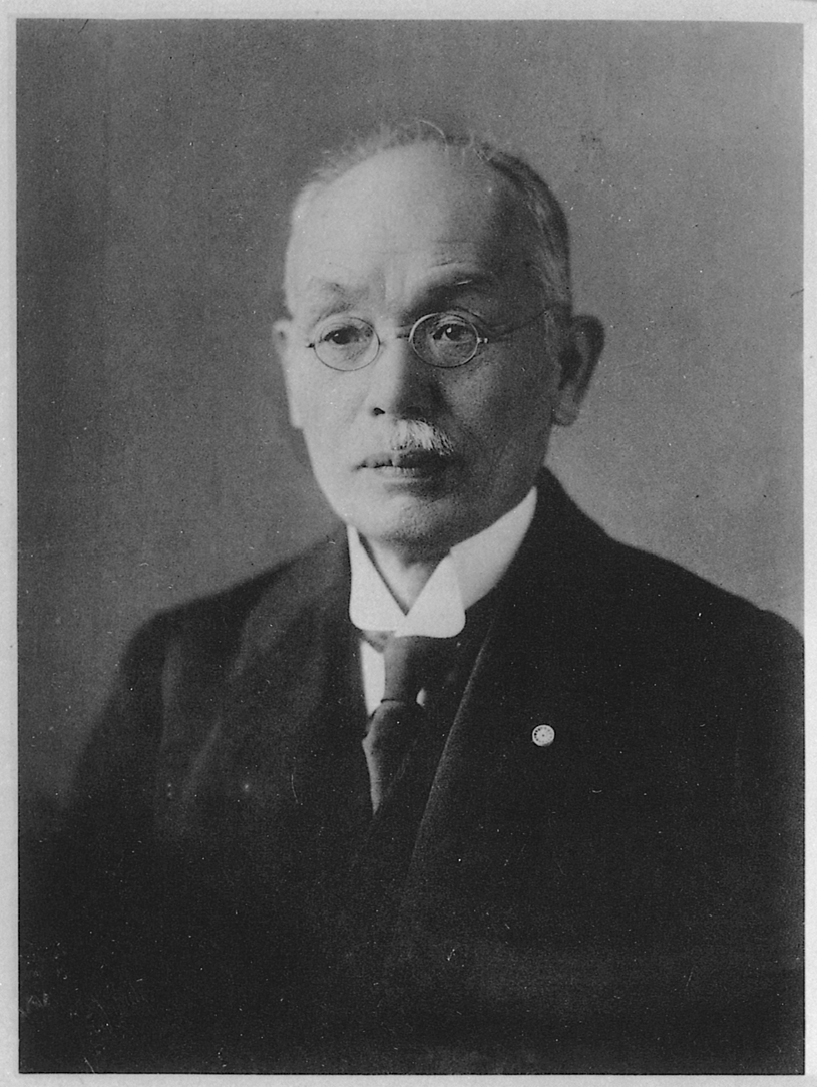
- Born: February 1, 1855; Fukuoka, Japan
- Died: November 7, 1944 (aged 89)
- Occupation: Philosopher

Inoue Tetsujirō (井上 哲次郎; February 1, 1855 – December 7, 1944) was a Japanese philosopher, poet and educator. He is known for introducing Western philosophy in Japan and for being a pioneer in Eastern philosophy. He became the first Japanese professor of philosophy at Tokyo Imperial University, and also served as the 2nd President of Daito Bunka Academy.

He condemned Christianity as fundamentally incompatible with the theocratic, polytheistic Japanese polity and thus considered its followers "inherently disloyal" to Japan. He compiled A Dictionary of Philosophy (哲学字彙, Tetsugaku jii), which was first published in 1881, again in 1884, and finally in 1912.

== Biography ==
Inoue was born on February 1, 1855, in Dazaifu, Chikuzen Province (present-day Dazaifu, Fukuoka Prefecture), the third son of physician Funakoshi Shuntatsu.

After moving to Hakata to study English in 1868, he studied Western studies at Kōunkan in Nagasaki. An outstanding student, he was sent to Kaisei Academy in Tokyo in 1875, after which he proceeded to Tokyo Imperial University to study philosophy. In 1878, he was adopted by Inoue Tetsuei. After graduating from Tokyo Imperial University in 1880, he composed Chinese poems, one of which inspired the composition of the poem White Aster by Ochiai Naobumi.

He helped introduce Western philosophy in Japan and became the first Japanese professor of philosophy at Tokyo Imperial University. He was also a pioneer in Eastern philosophy.

He was also a member of the International Education Movement. He wrote a commentary on Japan's Imperial Rescript on Education, wherein he encouraged the Japanese people to support the state and imperialism. Inoue's support of imperialism established him as opposed to the ideas of other proponents of International Education, such as Shimonaka Yasaburo, Noguchi Entaro, and Izumi Tetsu.

Inoue was the most prolific and prominent promoter of bushido ideology in Japan before 1945, authoring dozens of works and giving hundreds of lectures on the subject over almost half a century.

== See also ==
- Aizawa Seishisai, who was similarly distrustful of Christian converts
