= Hisui Sugiura =

Japanese graphic designer

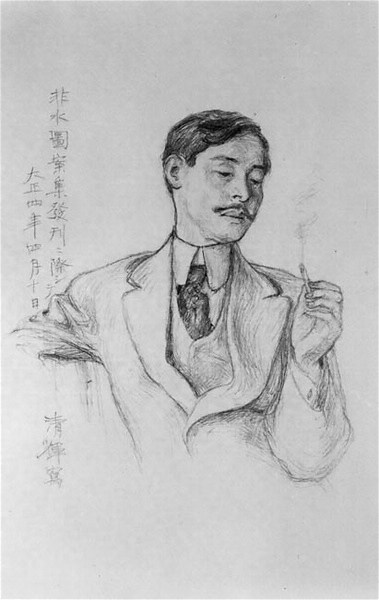
Sugiura Hisui, by Kuroda Seiki, National Museum of Modern Art, Tokyo

Hisui Sugiura (杉浦 非水, Sugiura Hisui; May 15, 1876 – August 18, 1965) was a Japanese graphic designer who was a pioneer of modern Japanese graphic design. He is considered a Japanese modernist designer.

== Early life and education ==
Sugiura was born in Matsuyama City, Ehime Prefecture in 1876. He graduated from the Japanese-style painting department of Tokyo School of Art, which is the present Tokyo University of the Arts, in 1901.

At first, Sugiura was aiming to become a Japanese-style painter and he studied under Matsuura Ganki, a Japanese style painter of the Shijō school. He went to Tokyo in 1897. Afterward, he studied under Kawabata Gyokusho. He entered the Japanese-style painting department of Tokyo School of Art. He learned the western-style painting and the European-style design from Kuroda Seiki while he was attending the Tokyo School of Art.

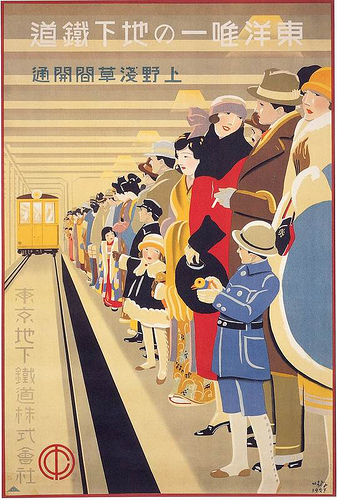
Tokyo Subway poster (1927) by Sugiura Hisui

== Professional life ==
After he graduated from the school, Sugiura became a designer and worked for the Osaka Sanwa print shop, assuming the position of design chief. However, the company's design department closed the next year.

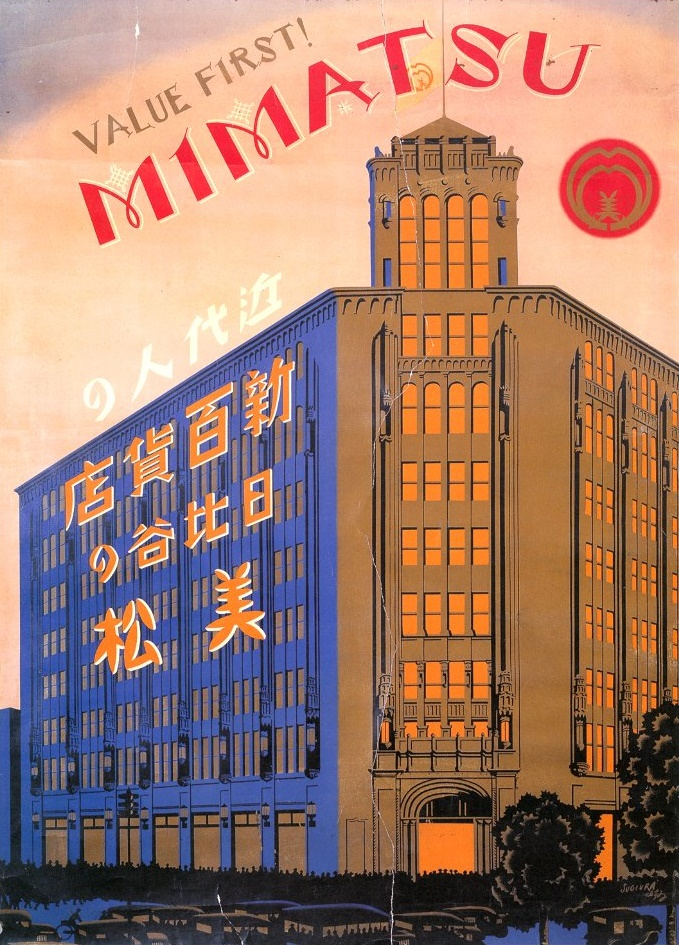
Mimatsu department store poster (1931), by Hisui Sugiura

Sugiura went to Shimane as a junior high school teacher in 1904, then went to Tokyo again the following year and began working for the Tokyo Chuo Shinbun. In 1908 he became a non-regular employee designer in the Mitsukoshi dry goods shop, taking charge of the cover of Mitsukoshi Times. He became the store's design chief in 1910 and so he left the newspaper company. The magazine Mitsukoshi began to be published in 1911. An exhibition of his works opened in 1912, at the Hibiya Park library. He became a lecturer of the design department of Nihon Bijutsu Gakko (Japan School of Art), as well as adviser to Calpis Co. (manufacturer of the beverage Calpis) in 1921.

Sugiura, soon after, went to Europe to study modern graphic design, from 1922 to 1924, and took inspiration from posters by Alphonse Mucha and Eugène Grasset, among others. Having returned to Japan, he formed "Hichininsha," a group to study posters, in 1926. He designed the poster of the Tokyo Metro Ginza Line opening to traffic in 1927. Many believe that Sugiura's works during this time period guided the early stages of Japanese commercial design.

Sugiura took the position of design department chief of the Imperial School of Fine Arts (now known as Musashino Art University) in 1929. Sugiura, in 1935, became one of the founders of the Tama Teikoku Bijutsu Gakko (now known as Tama Art University).

== Personal life and legacy ==
Sugiura Hisui's wife, Sugiura Suiko (d. 1960), was a poet.

Sugiura Hisui died in 1965. Many of his works are held at the National Museum of Modern Art, Tokyo and The Museum of Art, Ehime. An exhibit of his works toured in Japan in 2021 and 2022.

== Works ==
- Mitsukoshi Poster (angel design) (1915)
- Album of 100 Flowers (1920, also known as Picture Study of Japanese Flowering Plants)
- Tokyo Underground Railway (present Tokyo Metro Ginza Line Ueno-Asakusa section) opening advertisement poster (1927)
- the 3rd Exhibition of "Hichininsha" poster (1928)
- Hisui Sōsaku Zuan (1930)
- Package design of cigarette 'Hibiki' (1932)
- Package design of cigarette 'Hikari' (1936)

== Awards ==
- Japan Art Academy Imperial Award (1955)
- Medals of Honor (Japan) with Purple Ribbon (1958)
