= Akiko Baba =

Japanese tanka poet and literary critic

- 馬場 あき子
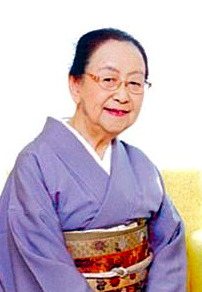
- Akiko Baba
- Born: 28 January 1928 (age 98); Tokyo, Japan
- Writing career
- Pen name: 馬場 あき子

Akiko Baba (馬場 あき子, Baba Akiko) (born January 28, 1928) is a Japanese tanka poet and literary critic. Her real name is Akiko Iwata (岩田 暁子, Iwata Akiko).

== Overviews ==
She also has an interest in Noh drama, and her works have been performed at the National Theatre of Japan. Heavenly Maiden Tanka is a collection of her poems translated by Hatsue Kawamura and Jane Reichhold. She has won a number of prizes, including the 45th Yomiuri Prize and the Asahi Prize.
