= Araragi (magazine) =

Japanese literary magazine

Araragi (アララギ) was a Japanese literary magazine active from 1908 to 1997.

== History and profile ==
Araragi was established by Itō Sachio in 1908. He was also the editor of the magazine until his death in 1913. Shimagi Akahiko was the next editor of the magazine.

it was a leading magazine of tanka (short poems). A group of poets who contributed to the magazine has come to be known as the Araragi school.

Originally, under the over-all direction of Itō, Chikashi Koizumi, Mokichi Saitō, Jun Ishiwara and others took turns as editors. Under Koizumi, a pattern of delayed or missing issues ensued, and in 1912 a schism with Saitō and others deepened, exacerbating the problem of erratic publication. Saitō complained of the wretched condition to Shimaki Akahito, who became exasperated enough to travel from Nagano Prefecture to Tokyo, and the legal responsibility for editing temporarily passed from Koizumi to Saitō. In June 1914, thanks to close connections between Shimaki and Shigeo Iwanami, Iwanami Shoten began handling sales and distribution. In February 1915 Shimaki became the editor and publisher, and a formal sales relationship with Iwanami Shoten was established on March 1. Shimaki kept the accounts in order, started a buying club for artwork by a member of the group, the painter Hirafuku Hyakusui, and worked to expand membership. Saitō’s first collection of tanka, Shakkō ("Red Light") was a sensation and example of new trends in tanka, boosting the reputation of Araragi and increasing the number of copies printed. Shimaki's students such as Kohei Tsuchida and Juztō Kagoshima inherited his strict "drawing from nature" style, but this tended towards narrow formalism, resulting in Koizumi, Ishiwara, Shinobu Orikuchi and others withdrawing from Araragi and founding Nikkō in 1924, together with Hakushū Kitahara, Yūgure Maeda, and others.

In the postwar period, Araragi continued to publish, and was shut down in December 1997.

There are four successors to Araragi: Miyoshi Koichi, who published Araragi from 1993 until it ceased publication, began publishing Seinan (青南); other editors and contributors formed groups to publish Shin Araragi, Tanka 21st Century, and Araragi Ha.
