= Machi Tawara =

Japanese writer (born 1962)

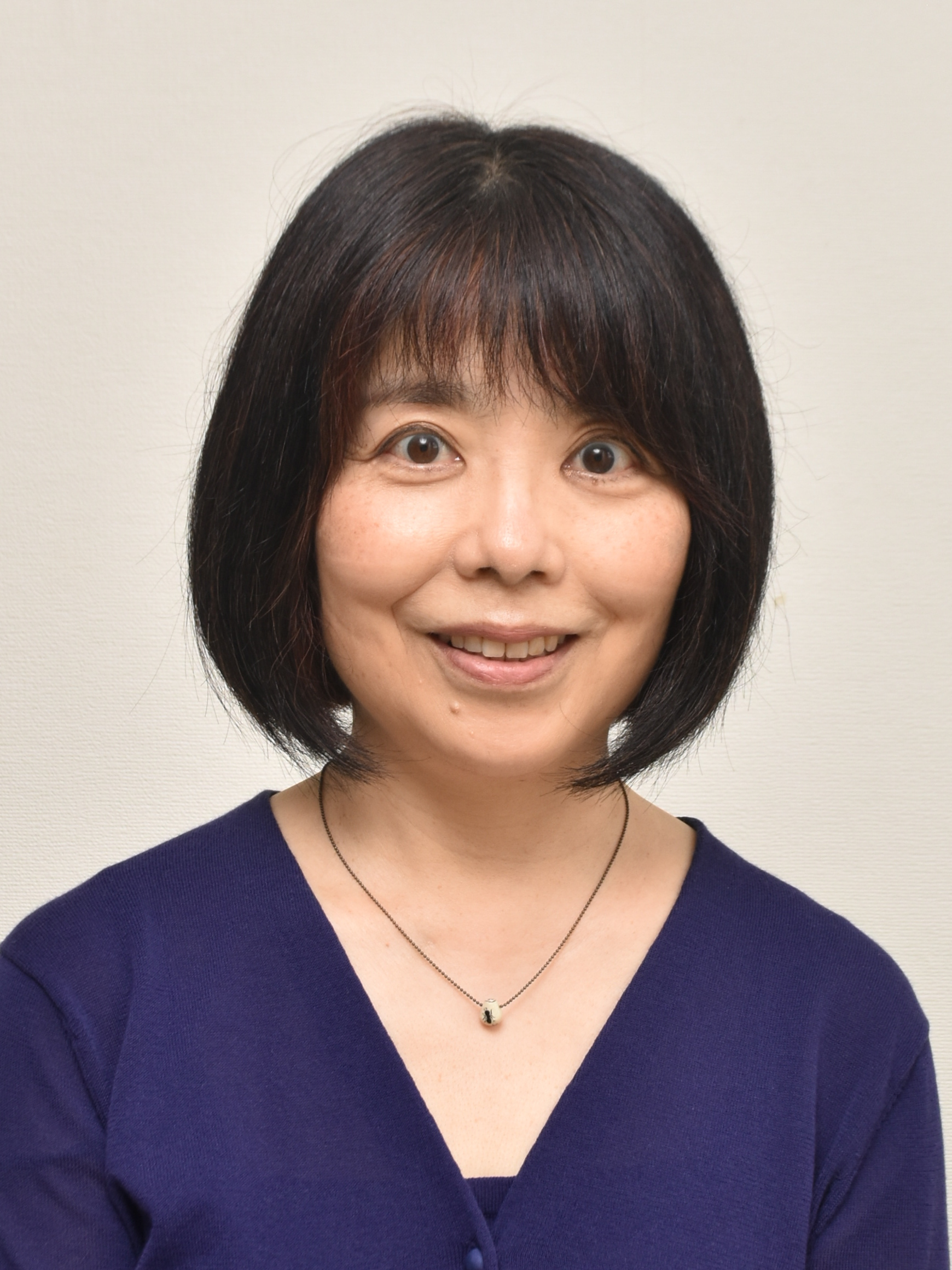
Image of Machi Tawara

Machi Tawara (俵万智, Tawara Machi; born December 31, 1962) is a contemporary Japanese writer, translator and poet.

Tawara is most famous as a contemporary poet. She is credited with revitalizing the tanka for modern Japanese audiences. Her skill as a translator consist of translating classical Japanese into modern Japanese, for example books such as the Man'yōshū and the Taketori Monogatari.

== Biography ==
She was born in 1962 in Osaka Prefecture, and moved to Fukui Prefecture when she was 14 years old. In 1981, she graduated from Waseda University with a degree in Japanese literature. Under the influence of the poet Sasaki Yukitsuna, she began to write tanka. After graduation, Tawara began teaching at Kanagawa Prefecture's Hashimoto High School, and she taught there until 1989.

She wrote a 50 poem sequence, August Morning (八月の朝), which received the 32nd Kadokawa Tanka Prize. She combined this collection with other small groups of tanka to release her first major collection of poems, Salad Anniversary (サラダ記念日) in 1987. It became a bestseller, selling well over 2.6 million copies. This collection went on to receive the 32nd Modern Japanese Poets Association Award.

Salad Anniversary started a phenomenon known as "salad phenomenon", comparable to "bananamania" (coined for the phenomenon caused by the first major book of Banana Yoshimoto). Tawara became a celebrity, and hosted television and radio shows where she extolled the virtues of tanka, and encouraged everyone to write them. She eventually released a collection of tanka sent to her by her fans, edited and selected by her.

Tawara's popularity is mainly intertwined with her skill with tanka. She deftly combines modern Japanese subjects with classical poetic forms and grammatical constructions, which both hearken back to the classical days but also makes the tanka more accessible to Japan's modern youth. Also, as opposed to the tanka of the classical era, Tawara's poems possess a lighter attitude and a crisp tone, as well as a universality that helps to make her poetry understood by all.

== Major works ==
- Salad Anniversary (サラダ記念日) [1987]
  - Salad Anniversary, trans. Jack Stamm. Tokyo: Kawade Shobo Shinsha, 1988
  - Salad Anniversary, trans. Juliet Winters Carpenter. Kodansha America, 1990. ISBN 0-87011-920-6.
- The Palm of the Wind's Hand (かぜのてのひら) [1991]
- Chocolate Revolution (チョコレート革命) [1997]

== Honors ==
- Medal with Purple Ribbon (2023)
