= Zenmaro Toki =

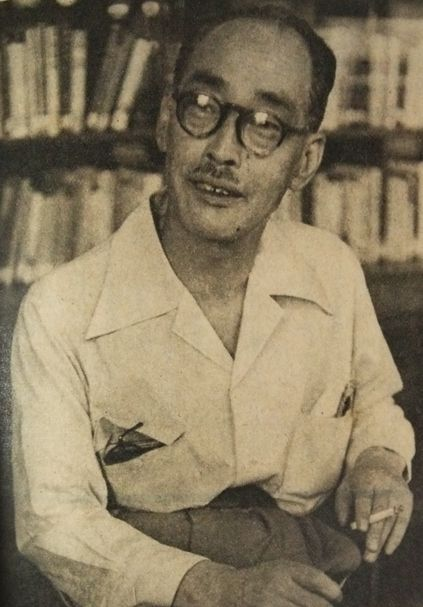
Toki Zenmaro

Zenmaro Toki (土岐 善麿 Toki Zenmaro; June 8, 1885 – April 15, 1980) was a Japanese Naturalist tanka poet. After initially taking up tanka in his teens, he studied under Kun'en Kaneko, and when in attendance at Waseda University he socialized with other notable Naturalist poets such as Bokusui Wakayama. Later, he earned the respect of the famous poet Takuboku Ishikawa, with whom he corresponded until the latter's death in 1912.

== Biography ==
Zenmaro Toki was born in 1885. He was born in Tokyo.

He first took up tanka composition in middle school. He became a disciple of Kun'en Kaneko, a minor poet who had studied under Ochiai Naobumi and who, according to historian and critic Donald Keene, never fulfilled his early potential. Kun'en experimented with just about every tanka school, and the characteristic that critics have traditionally associated with him is his having been a "city poet". This was likely a characteristic that attracted Zenmaro to him, as the two shared little else in common.

Zenmaro attended Waseda University, where he fraternized with Bokusui Wakayama and other poets. He also studied European literature extensively. Upon graduation, he found work as a journalist. His talent as a poet first garnered attention in 1910 when he published Nakiwarai ("Smiling Through the Tears"), a collection of 143 poems written entirely in roman letters, in three-line stanzas. Takuboku Ishikawa praised this work as being unlike that of any other tanka poet of the day; although the poems were written in classical Japanese, their subject-matter was drawn from everyday life in a manner typical of the Naturalist poets. The three-line form Zenmaro's collection pioneered was soon thereafter adopted by Takuboku.

He adopted mild socialist tendencies in the 1910s, and when, in the 1930s, the militarist government began to crack down heavily on left-wing literature, he shifted over to writing scholarly works rather than producing propaganda.

He wrote for the Asahi Shimbun from 1918 to 1940.

Zenmaro died in 1980.

== Works cited ==
- Keene, Donald (1999) [1984]. A History of Japanese Literature, Vol. 4: Dawn to the West – Japanese Literature of the Modern Era (Poetry, Drama, Criticism) (paperback ed.). New York, NY: Columbia University Press. ISBN 978-0-231-11435-6.
