= Eiwa taiyaku shūchin jisho =

First English-Japanese dictionary in Japan

Pocket Dictionary of the English and Japanese Language
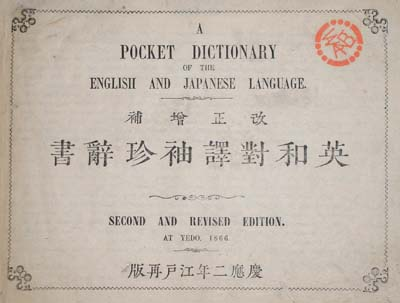
- Author: Tatsunosuke Hori
- Language: Japanese
- Publisher: Bansho Shirabesho
- Publication date: 1862
- Publication place: Japan

Eiwa-Taiyaku-Shuchin-Jisho (Japanese: 英和対訳袖珍辞書 lit. 'Pocket Dictionary of the English and Japanese Language'), was the first English-Japanese dictionary in Japan, edited by Tatsunosuke Hori in 1862 and published by the Bansho Shirabesho (Institute for the Study of Barbarian Books).

It was created by translating the Dutch items of H. Picard's A New Pocket Dictionary of the English-Dutch and Dutch-English Languages into Japanese.

The significance of this dictionary for the rapid modernization/industrialization of Japan during the Meiji era is discussed in "Codification, Technology Absorption, and the Globalization of the Industrial Revolution": "This project was the first step in what would become a massive government effort to codify and absorb Western science."

Juhasz et al. analyze historical Japanese library holdings to demonstrate that "Between 1600 and 1860, the number of technical books in Japanese grew by 1.6 percent per year. The rate almost sextupled to 8.8 percent per year between 1870 and 1900, starting just as staff at the bakufu’s Institute for Barbarian Books produced the 1862 and 1871 English-Japanese dictionaries" (the first and second edition of Eiwa taiyaku shūchin jisho).

Takayanagi notes "The Eiwa taiyaku shūchin jisho...ushered in the age of English studies" (in Japan).
