= White Aster (poem) =

White Aster (孝女白菊の歌, Kōjo Shiragiku no Uta) is the title of an 1889 epic Japanese poem by Ochiai Naobumi, who was inspired by Chinese-language poems composed by Inoue Tetsujirō.

== Story ==
The epic tells the story of White Aster, a maiden who was so named because she was found in a clump of white asters. She goes on a journey in search of her father, who has gone hunting and whose whereabouts are unclear. She is captured by robbers, but is rescued by her older brother, who had left home and became a priest. Subsequently, she attempts suicide by drowning as a result of a conflict that had her torn between her sense of obligation to the old man who had treated her so kindly and the last will of her mother, who wanted her to marry her brother (the two not being related by blood). Thereafter, she is reunited with her brother, and when the two return home together, they find that their father is already back, safe and sound.

== History ==
Inoue Tetsujiro, the original writer, wrote that he graduated from Tokyo Imperial University in 1880 and wanted to study in Europe, but was unable to go. Suffering from smouldering discontent, he wrote many poems. He happened to compose a story of White Aster, and made it a long story of Chinese-language poems. Naofumi Ochiai rewrote it in new style Japanese language poems in 1888 and 1889 and published it in the Toyo Gakkai Zasshi (Oriental Association Journal). This was accepted in young people throughout Japan and it was translated into German by Karl Florenz in 1895 under the name Weissaster and into English by Arthur Lloyd under the name White Aster in 1898.

== Opening lines ==
Chinese Text:

孝女白菊詩 井上巽軒

阿蘇山下荒村晩 夕陽欲沈鳥争返
無辺落木如雨繁 隔水何処鐘声遠
此時少女待阿爺 出門小立空悲嗟
髷髪如雲風中乱 嬌顔春浅美於花
阿爺一朝衝寒起 蘆花風外渡野水
暁月影野昏廟西 遥遥去入深山裏
不知猶為遊猟不 数日不帰何処留

Japanese:

孝女白菊の歌 落合直文
阿蘇の山里秋ふけて、眺めさびしき夕まぐれ
いずこの寺の鐘ならむ、諸行無常とつげわたる
をりしもひとり門を出て、父を待つなる少女あり
年は十四の春あさく、色香ふくめるそのさまは
梅かさくらかわからねども、末たのもしく見えにけり
父は先つ日遊猟（かり）にいで、今猶おとずれなしとかや
軒に落ちくる木の葉にも、かけひの水のひびきにも
父やかへるとうたがわれ、夜な夜なねむるひまもなし
わきて雨ふるさ夜中は、庭の芭蕉の音しげく、
鳴くなる虫のこえごえに、いとどあわれを添えにけり

Rough Translation:

In a remote and deserted village of Mt. Aso, the sun is setting and crying birds are going to their beds
There are some trees which are down, wet with water, In the rain, one hears the bells of a temple from far away
At the gate of a house, a maiden of about 14 is waiting, for her father who had gone hunting for animals
She is too young, but her face reminds one of a beautiful flower
Her hairs are disheveled by wind, she had been sleepless for days thinking of her father

== The response in Kumamoto ==
In September 1958, Shigeyoshi Matsumae established a monument to Shiragiku near Sugaru Falls, in Minamiaso, Kumamoto inspired by the view in Aso. This place has no special relation with Shiragiku. In 1951, Seishi Araki of Kumamoto wrote about Shiragiku in a book Legends of Aso. Mamoru Uchida and Seishi Araki were of the view that although this story of Shiragiku was a fiction, the monument and a temple which was said related to Shiragiku will serve as a tourist attraction. This story has become as one of the stories played by Satsuma biwa.
