= Kinoshita Rigen =

Japanese author

- 木下 利玄
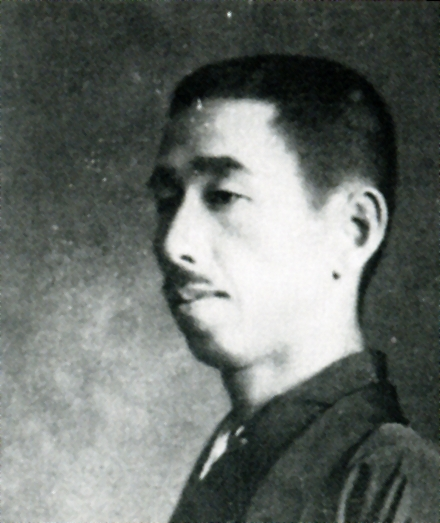
- Kinoshita Rigen
- Born: 1 January 1886; Okayama, Japan
- Died: 15 February 1925 (aged 39); Kamakura, Kanagawa, Japan
- Resting place: Yanaka Cemetery, Tokyo; Daiko-ji, Okayama
- Education: Tokyo Imperial University
- Occupation: Writer
- Writing career
- Language: Japanese
- Genre: tanka poetry

Kinoshita Rigen (木下 利玄; January 1, 1886 – February 15, 1925) was the pen-name of Japanese author Viscount Kinoshita Toshiharu, noted for his tanka poetry, active in Meiji and Taishō period Japan.

== Early life ==
Kinoshita was born in Ashimori Village, Kayo District, Okayama Prefecture (present-day Ashimori neighborhood of Kita-ku, Okayama). He was the second son of Toshinaga, the younger brother of Kinoshita Toshiyasu, the 13th and last daimyō of the 25,000koku Ashimori han. The Kinoshita clan was a direct lineal descendant of a brother-in-law of Toyotomi Hideyoshi. In 1891, at the age of 5, upon the death of his uncle Toshiyasu, he became the adopted heir of the main Kinoshita lineage and was sent to Tokyo to inherit the title of viscount (shishaku) under the kazoku peerage system. Kinoshita attended the Gakushūin Peers' School, where he was a classmate of Mushanokōji Saneatsu. He subsequently graduated from the Literature Department of Tokyo Imperial University, where his classmates included Shiga Naoya, and he was a student of the poet Sasaki Nobutsuna, joining Sasaki's "Chikuhakukai" literary circle.

== Literary career ==
Kinoshita was a co-founder of the Shirakabaha ("White Birch") Society, along with Shiga Naoya and Mushanokōji Saneatsu in 1910. He contributed extensively to the society's literary magazine, with elegant tanka verses, written in an easy-to-understand colloquial language. Kinoshita married a fellow student, Yokoo Teruko, in 1911, the same year that he graduated, and had a son the following year. However, his son soon died; Kinoshita would father two more sons and one daughter, but only the third son survived. From 1912-1916, Kinoshita taught at a junior high school in the Mejiro neighborhood of Tokyo. He resigned his teaching post in 1916 to devote his efforts to poetry. In 1922, was diagnosed with pulmonary tuberculosis and became bedridden, although it is likely that he had started to experience symptoms of the disease several years earlier, as he had relocated to Kamakura, Kanagawa Prefecture in 1919, as the sea air had a reputation for being good for lung disorders, and which was a favorite residence for many of the Shirakaba authors. In 1924, he joined the staff of Nikkō, a literary magazine opposed to the Araragi movement. In 1925, his illness became critical, and he died on February 15 at his home in Kamakura at the age of 39. His ashes were divided between the Kinoshita family temple of Daikō-ji in Okayama and Yanaka Cemetery in Tokyo. His third son, Toshifuku, inherited the peerage title.

Kinoshita published numerous anthologies of his verses, including Kogyoku ("Red Ball", 1919) and Ichiro ("One Alley", 1924).

== Kinoshita Rigen birthplace ==
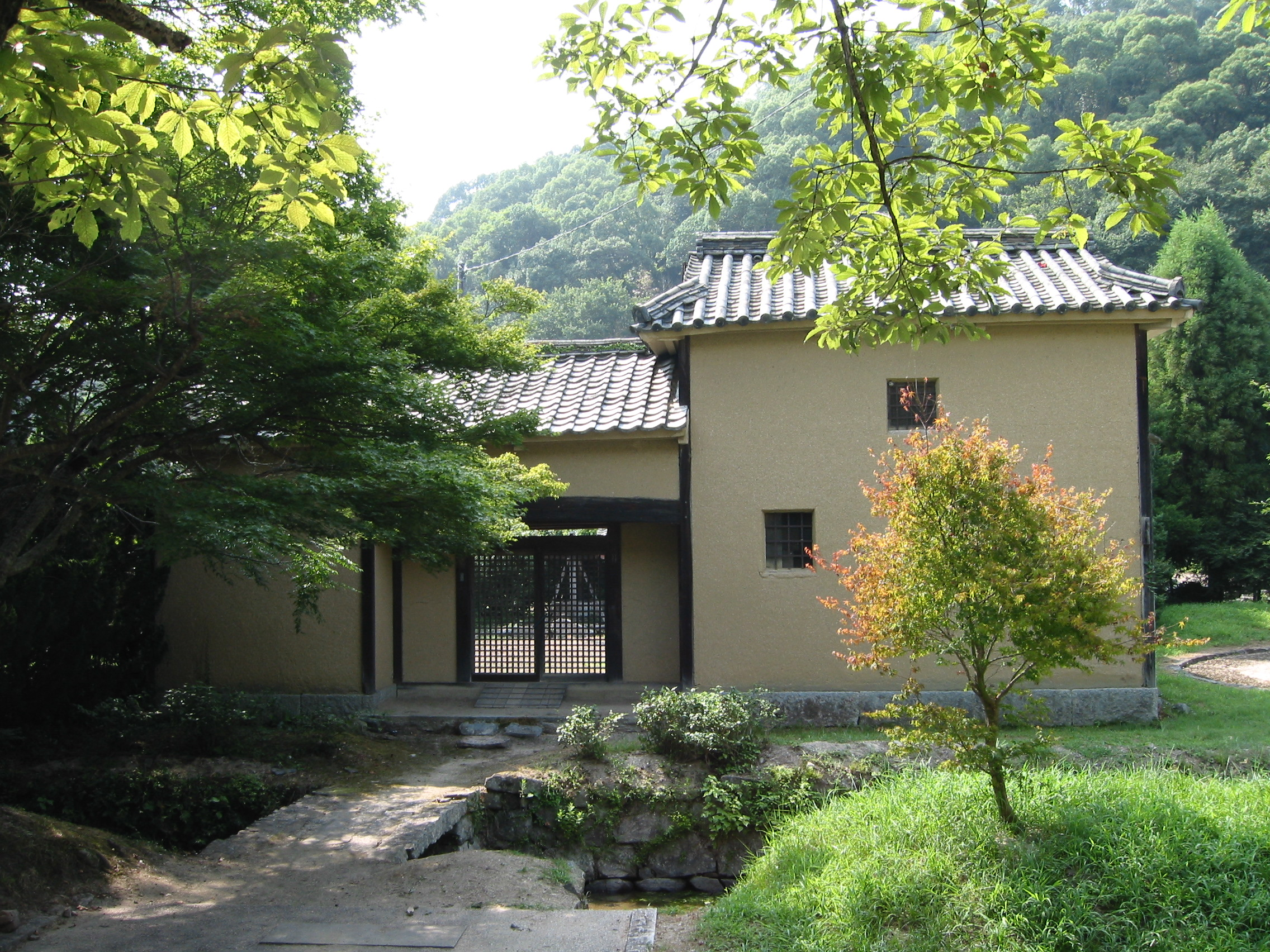
Kinoshita Rigen birth house

The house where Kinoshita Rigen was born still exists, and is preserved as an Okayama Prefecture Historic Site. The house is a single-story building with a hipped roof and tiled roof, surrounded by an eaves, and has a two-bay entrance hall with a raised platform at the front. It is located at the eastern edge of the former jin'ya of Ashimori Domain, adjacent to the Chikamizu Omizu Garden. A simple garden faces the upper-level drawing room, and the exterior is not particularly large, but another hipped roof extends from the center of the rear, and the house is quite spacious towards the back. Inside the storehouse to the right of the entrance, valuable documents such as the letters of appointment of Toyotomi Hideyoshi and Hidetsugu as regents, and documents written by Hideyoshi himself, were discovered.

== See also ==
- Japanese literature
- List of Japanese authors
