= Tatsunosuke Hori =

Japanese interpreter and translator (1823–1892)

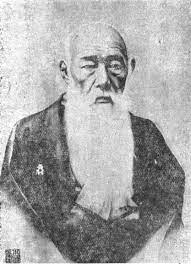

Hori Tatsunosuke (Japanese: 堀 達之助; 1823 – 1892) was a Japanese interpreter and translator of Dutch and English during the Edo period. Although he initially came from a line of Dutch translators, he was later able to learn English.

== Biography ==
Born in Nagasaki, he was the son of a Dutch translator.

He was the translator of Commodore James Biddle's 1846 letter at Uraga Channel. He was also present at Commodore Perry's arrival at Uraga on July 8, 1853, and served as an official interpreter. He told Perry in English "I can speak Dutch" and later began a conversation in Dutch with Anton L. C. Portman who could speak Dutch on Perry's ship. He was able to convince the Americans to allow him and Nakajima Saburōsuke (1821–1869), an officer of the Uraga magistracy, to board the USS Susquehanna, on which they delivered the order that all foreign ships were to be expelled from Japanese ports. He later went on to found an English-teaching school and published a manual on learning English.

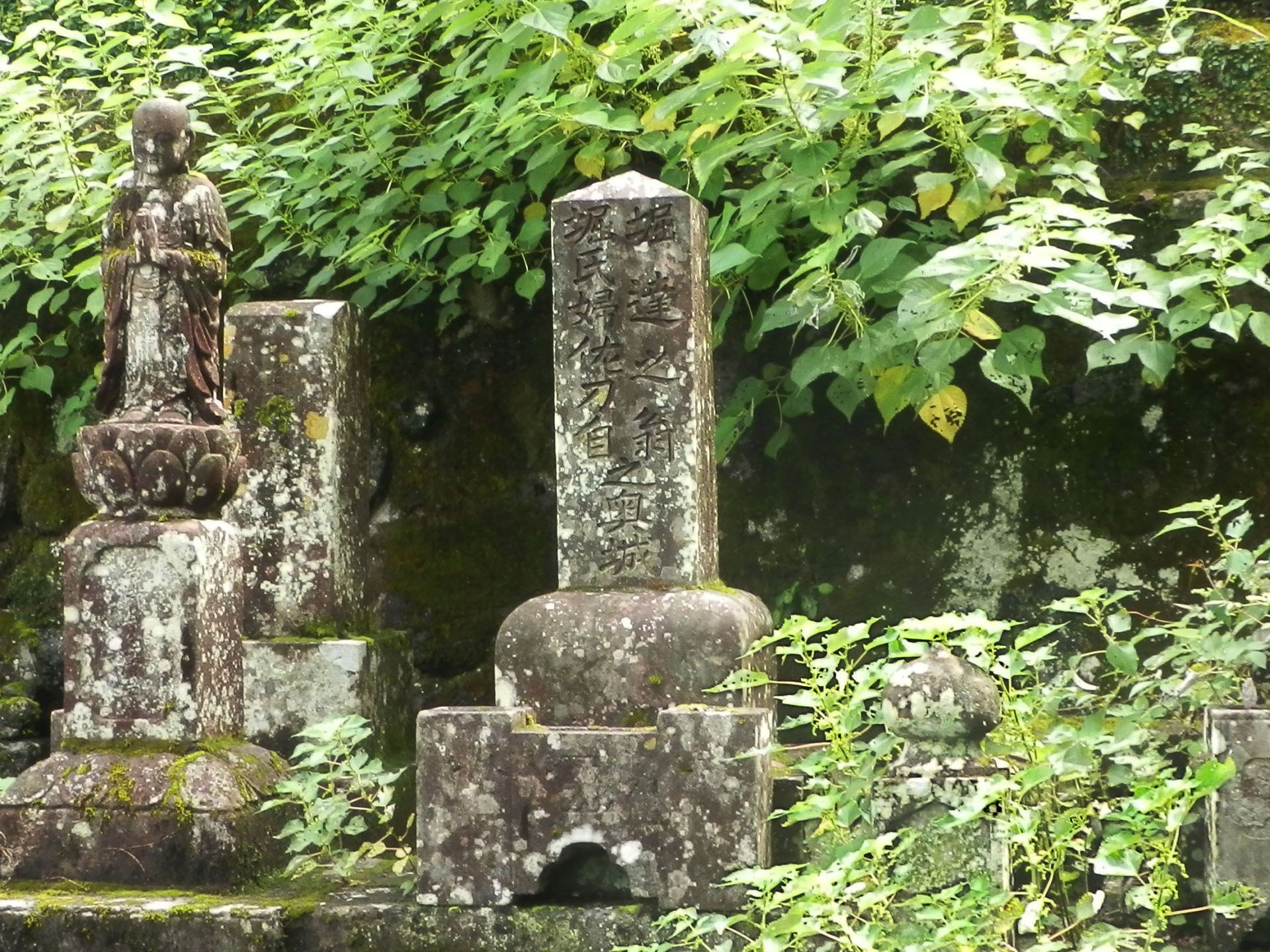

When the American Lieutenant John Rodgers of the USS Vincennes landed at the port of Shimoda on 13 May 1855, Hori assisted in mediating the negotiations between Rodgers and Shimoda's governors. He had been learning English with the help of a Webster's dictionary which had been donated by the Perry expedition.

In 1862, Hori and others finished compiling the Eiwa taiyaku shūchin jisho (英和対訳袖珍辞書), an English pocket dictionary that was one of the most widely used from the later Edo period into the early Meiji period. This dictionary's creation had been requested by the government, and was the second English dictionary overall but the first to be organised according to modern criteria. This dictionary has been credited as ushering in "the age of English studies" and consequently leading to a decline in importance in Dutch studies. That being said, it is known that this dictionary took heavy influence from H. Picard's A New Pocket Dictionary of English-Dutch and Dutch-English Languages from 1857.

Hori later became the first English professor at what would later become Tokyo Imperial University.

Hori died in 1892.
