= Mokichi Saitō =

Japanese poet (1882–1953)

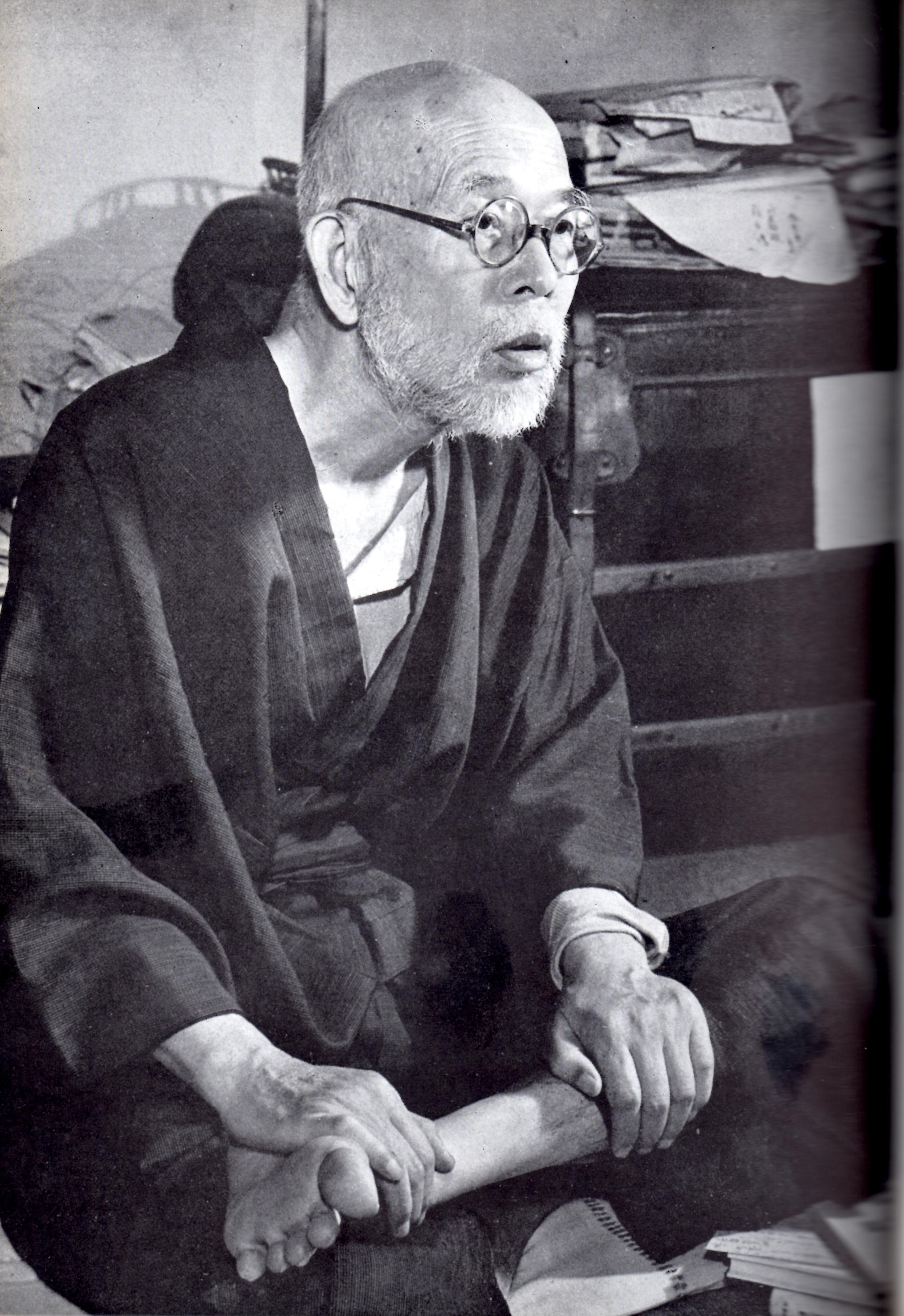
- Mokichi Saitō, c. 1952
- Born: May 14, 1882; Minamimurayama-gun, Yamagata Prefecture, Japan
- Died: February 25, 1953 (aged 70); Daikyocho, Shinjuku, Tokyo, Japan
- Education: Tokyo Imperial University
- Occupations: Waka poet, essayist, psychiatrist
- Children: Shigeta Saitō Morio Kita
- Relatives: Yuka Saitō (granddaughter)
- Writing career
- Notable work: Red lights (1913)
- Notable awards: Japan Academy Prize (1940); Order of Culture (1951)

Mokichi Saitō (斎藤 茂吉, Saitō Mokichi; Japanese pronunciation: [sai.toː (|) mo.kʲi̥.tɕi], May 14, 1882 – February 25, 1953) was a Japanese poet of the Taishō period, a member of the Araragi school of tanka, and a psychiatrist.

Mokichi was born in the village of Kanakame, now part of Kaminoyama, Yamagata in 1882. He attended Tokyo Imperial University Medical School and, upon graduation in 1911, joined the staff of Sugamo Hospital (present-day Tokyo Metropolitan Matsuzawa Hospital) where he began his study of psychiatry. He later directed Aoyama Hospital, a psychiatric facility.

Mokichi studied tanka under Itō Sachio, a disciple of Masaoka Shiki and leader, after his master's death, of the Negishi Tanka Society; Sachio also edited the society's official journal Ashibi. This magazine, due to Sachio's increasing commitment to other literary activities, was subsequently replaced by Araragi in 1908. The publication in 1913 of Mokichi's first collection of tanka, Shakkō ("Red Light") was an immediate sensation with the broader public. The first edition collected the poet's work from the years 1905-1913 and included 50 tanka sequences (rensaku), with the autobiographical "My Mother is Dying" (死にたまふ母, Shinitamafuhaha) being perhaps the most celebrated sequence in the book.

Mokichi's career as a poet spanned almost 50 years. At the time of his death at the age of 70, he had published seventeen poetry collections which include "14,200 or so poems," the collected works being overwhelmingly devoted to tanka. In 1950 he received the inaugural Yomiuri Prize for poetry. He received the Order of Culture in 1951.

Mokichi was the family doctor of author Ryūnosuke Akutagawa and may have unknowingly played an indirect role in the latter's suicide. He also wrote philological essays on waka of Kakinomoto no Hitomaro and of Minamoto no Sanetomo.
