= Itō Sachio =

Japanese writer (1864–1913)

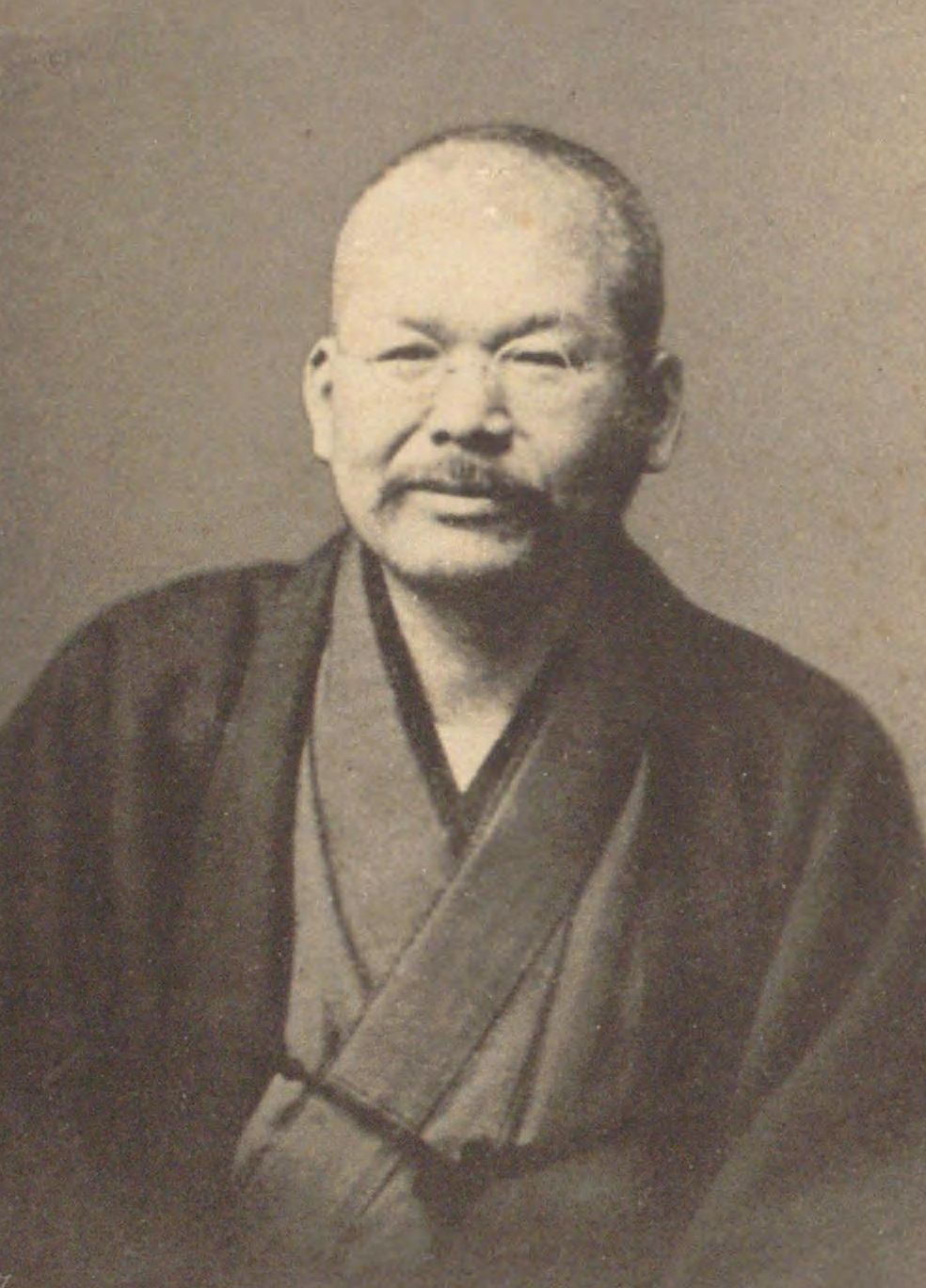
- Itō Sachio
- Born: 18 September 1864; Sanmu, Chiba, Japan
- Died: 30 July 1913 (aged 48); Tokyo, Japan
- Occupation: Writer
- Writing career
- Genre: poetry

Itō Sachio (伊藤 左千夫; 18 September 1864 - 30 July 1913) was the pen-name of Itō Kōjirō (伊藤 幸次郎), a Japanese tanka poet and novelist active during the Meiji period of Japan.

== Biography ==
Itō was born in what is now Sanmu city, Chiba prefecture, as the younger son to a farming family. He attended the Meiji Hōritsu gakko (the predecessor of Meiji University), but left without graduating.

His interest in poetry led him to visit the famous author Masaoka Shiki, who accepted him as a student. Itō established the literary magazine Araragi in 1903, and served as its editor until 1908. During this time, he published his poems, literary criticism and studies on the Man'yōshū. He published a sentimental love story, Nogiku no Haka ("The Wild Daisy", 1906) in the literary magazine Hototogisu. The story became a popular classic, and was made into movies in 1955, 1966 and in 1981.

Itō came to be regarded as Masaoka Shiki's closest disciple with the posthumous publication of his tanka anthology Sachio Kashū in 1920. His own disciples included Saitō Mokichi and Tsuchiya Bunmei.

In addition to his literary career, Itō was also an amateur master of the Japanese tea ceremony. He died of a cerebral hemorrhage.

== See also ==
- Japanese literature
- List of Japanese authors
