= Ochiai Naobumi =

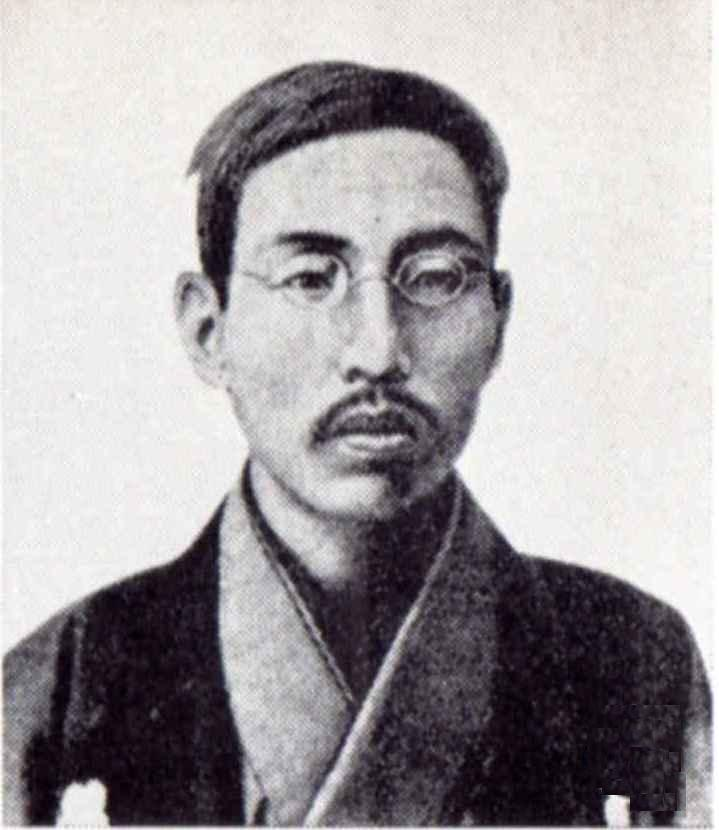
- Born: December 16, 1861; Miyagi, Japan
- Died: December 16, 1903 (aged 42)
- Occupations: Scholar of Japanese literature, tanka poet
- Relatives: Brother: Ayukai Fusanoshin(Historian, Orientalist)

Ochiai Naobumi (落合 直文; 16 December 1861 – 16 December 1903) was a Japanese tanka poet and scholar of Japanese literature of the Meiji Era. He was born as Ayukai Morimitsu and was the biological elder brother of the Korean scholar Ayukai Fusanoshin.

== Biography ==
Ochiai was born in what was then Motoyoshi County, Mutsu Province, as the second son to Ayukai Tarō Tairamorifusa (鮎貝太朗平盛房), a high-ranking retainer of the Sendai Domain. From the ages 11 to 13, he studied, among other things, kangaku (Chinese studies), at the Sendai Private School (仙台私塾), and in 1874 was adopted by the kokugaku scholar Ochiai Naoaki (落合直亮). His adopted father's research took him to Ise, where he studied in the Jingū Kyōin (神宮教院; later to become Kogakkan University).

In 1881, he moved to Tokyo, and the following year entered the School of Literature at Tokyo Imperial University. In 1884 he dropped out, and began three years of military service.

From 1889 onward, he taught at various academic institutions including Dai-ichi Kōtō Chūgakkō (第一高等中学校) and the Tōkyō Senmon Gakkō (the predecessor to modern Waseda University). One of his students at the Dai-ichi Kōtō Chūgakkō was the tanka poet and calligrapher Saishū Onoe.

In 1889, he joined Mori Ōgai in forming the literary society Shinsei Sha (新声社), and in August of that year they jointly translated and published the poetry anthology Omokage (於母影) which was to have a significant impact on contemporary Japanese poetry.

In 1893, he formed another literary society, the Asaka Society (浅香社, Asaka-sha).

== Legacy ==
Donald Keene called him "[t]he first distinctively new poet of the Meiji period" but commented that while he attempted to update tanka for the modern era, his attempts were "halfhearted". (Keene 1999, p. 12)

The Ochiai Naobumi National Tanka Contest (落合直文全国短歌大会, Ochiai Naobumi Zenkoku Tanka Taikai) is named after him.
