= Tanka =

Genre of classical Japanese poetry

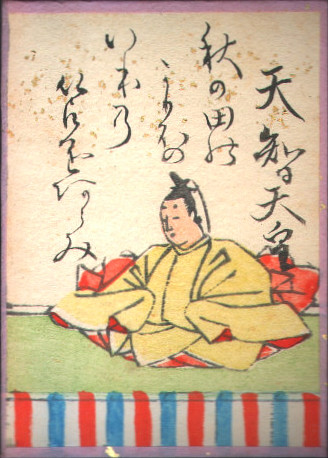
A poetry card from the card game version of the Ogura Hyakunin Isshu, a compilation of tanka

Tanka (短歌; "short poem") is a genre of classical Japanese poetry and one of the major genres of Japanese literature.

== Etymology ==
Originally, in the time of the influential poetry anthology Man'yōshū (latter half of the eighth century AD), the term tanka was used to distinguish "short poems" from the longer chōka (長歌; "long poems"). In the ninth and tenth centuries, however, notably with the compilation of the Kokinshū, the short poem became the dominant form of poetry in Japan, and the originally general word waka (和歌; "Japanese poem") became the standard name for this form. Japanese poet and critic Masaoka Shiki revived the term tanka in the early twentieth century for his statement that waka should be renewed and modernized. Haiku is also a term of his invention, used for his revision of standalone Hokku, with the same idea.

== Form ==
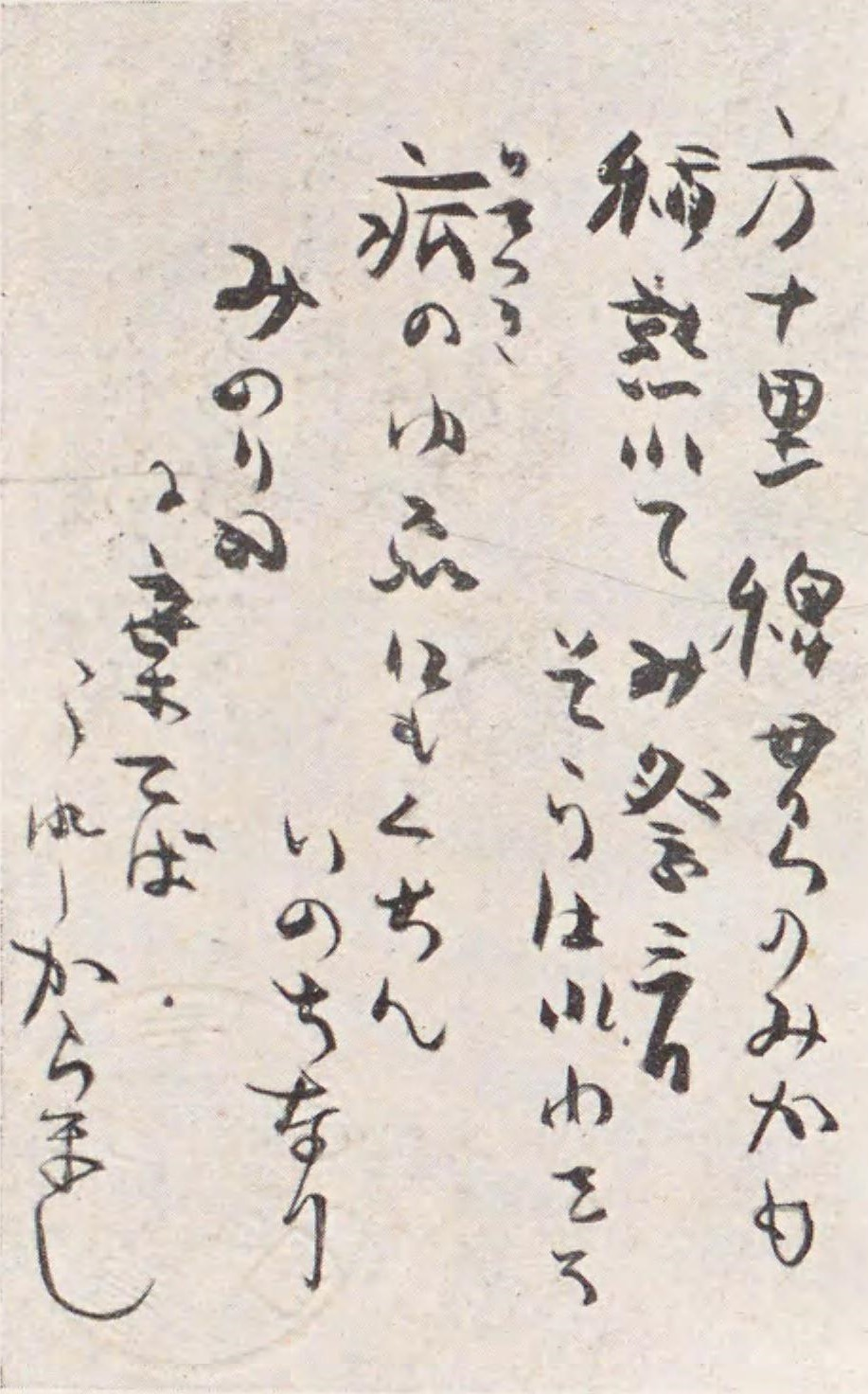
Last tanka poems by Miyazawa Kenji wrote in September of 1933 before his death. It reads: Within these ten square miles: is this in Hinuki alone? The rice ripe and for three festival days the whole sky clear Because of an illness, crumbling, this life— if I could give it for the dharma how glad I would be

Tanka consists of five units (often treated as separate lines when romanized or translated) usually with the following pattern of on (often treated as, roughly, the number of syllables per unit or line):

5-7-5-7-7.

The 5-7-5 is called the kami-no-ku (上の句; "upper phrase"), and the 7-7 is called the shimo-no-ku (下の句; "lower phrase"). Sometimes the distinction between Waka and Tanka are drawn on where the division is placed, either after the first couplet or after the first tercet, but sources disagree. Even in early classical compilations of these poems, such as the Ogura Hyakunin Isshu, the form is often broken to suit the poet's preferences.

While kami-no-ku and shimo-no-ku tend to make a pair, some devices can be used to undermine the rules of the pair. Certain rules allow a tanka to either exceed the syllable count or have it run short. Tanka that run long are called ji-amari, following a count of 5-7-5-8-7, and the form that runs short is called ji-tarazu, with 5-7-5-7-6 syllables. Tanka are also able to change the standard form of the rhyming as well. Ku-ware (splitting) is when a tanka looks like 5-7-5-9-5. Ku-matagari (straddling) is when the tanka looks like 8-4-5-7-7. The last two forms are able to function as a fermata or syncopation of music. This flexibility allows for changes in rhythm.

== History ==
=== Modern ===
During the Kojiki and Nihonshoki periods the tanka retained a well defined form, but the history of the mutations of the tanka itself forms an important chapter in haiku history, until the modern revival of tanka began with several poets who began to publish literary magazines, gathering their friends and disciples as contributors.

Yosano Tekkan and the poets that were associated with his Myōjō magazine were one example, but that magazine was fairly short-lived (Feb. 1900 – Nov. 1908). Contributors included Ishikawa Takuboku and Hō Shō, a young high school student, later known as Yosano Akiko. In 1980 the New York Times published a representative work by Ishikawa:

東海の
小島の磯の
白砂に
われ泣きぬれて
蟹とたわむる

Tōkai no
kojima no iso no
shirasuna ni
ware naki nurete
kani to tawamuru

In the Eastern Sea,
Of the beach of a small island,
On the white sand.
I, my face streaked with tears,
Am playing with a crab

Masaoka Shiki's (1867–1902) poems and writing (as well as the work of his friends and disciples) have had a more lasting influence. The magazine Hototogisu, which he founded, still publishes.

In the Meiji period (1868–1912), Shiki claimed the situation with waka should be rectified, and waka should be modernized in the same way as other things in the country. He praised the style of Man'yōshū as manly, as opposed to the style of Kokin Wakashū, the model for waka for a thousand years, which he denigrated and called feminine. He praised Minamoto no Sanetomo, the third shōgun of the Kamakura shogunate, who was a disciple of Fujiwara no Teika and composed waka in a style much like that in the Man'yōshū.

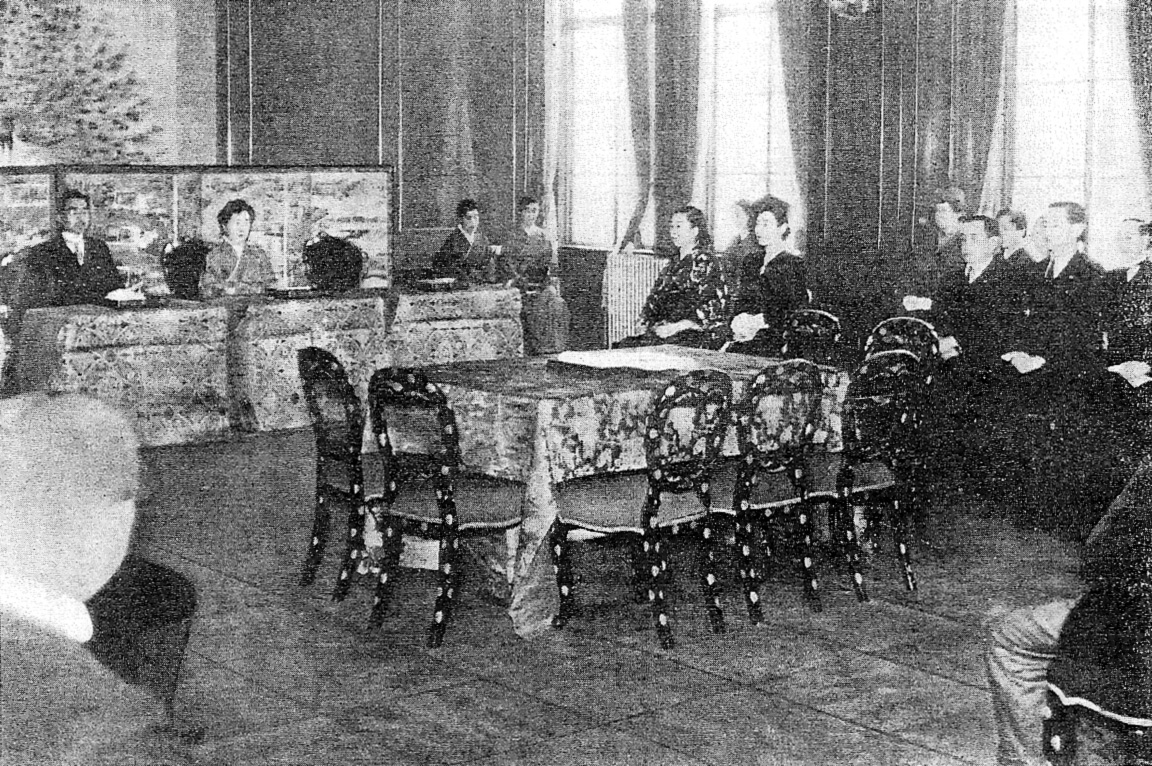
Ceremony of the Utakai Hajime, about 1950

Following Shiki's death, in the Taishō period (1912–26), Mokichi Saitō and his friends began publishing a magazine, Araragi, which praised the Man'yōshū. Using their magazine they spread their influence throughout the country. Their modernization aside, in the court the old traditions still prevailed. The court continues to hold many utakai (waka reading parties) both officially and privately. The utakai that the Emperor holds on the first of the year is called Utakai Hajime and it is an important event for waka poets; the Emperor himself releases a single tanka for the public's perusal.

After World War II, waka began to be considered out-of-date, but since the late 1980s it has revived under the example of contemporary poets, such as Machi Tawara. With her 1987 bestselling collection Salad Anniversary, the poet has been credited with revitalising the tanka for modern audiences.

Today there are many circles of tanka poets. Many newspapers have a weekly tanka column, and there are many professional and amateur tanka poets; Makoto Ōoka's poetry column was published seven days a week for more than 20 years on the front page of Asahi Shimbun. As a parting gesture, outgoing PM Jun'ichirō Koizumi wrote a tanka to thank his supporters.

The Japanese imperial family continue to write tanka for the New Year.

Although English-language poets were more focused on haikus, tanka did become popular in America. Some American poets who have written popular tanka have been Amy Lowell and Carolyn Kizer.

== Poetic culture ==
In ancient times, it was a custom between two writers to exchange waka instead of letters in prose. In particular, it was common between lovers. Reflecting this custom, five of the twenty volumes of the Kokin Wakashū gathered waka for love. In the Heian period the lovers would exchange waka in the morning when lovers met at the woman's home. The exchanged waka were called Kinuginu (後朝), because it was thought the man wanted to stay with his lover and when the sun rose he had almost no time to put on his clothes on which he had lain instead of a mattress (it being the custom in those days). Works of this period, The Pillow Book and The Tale of Genji provide us with such examples in the life of aristocrats. Murasaki Shikibu uses 795 waka in her The Tale of Genji as waka her characters made in the story. Some of these are her own, although most are taken from existing sources. Shortly, making and reciting waka became a part of aristocratic culture. They recited a part of appropriate waka freely to imply something on an occasion.

As a way of emotional and intimate communication, couples would often write tanka for each other after going on a date or spending time with each other to give to one another as a gift of gratitude. Often times the upper part of the poem would describe the image of what happened, and the bottom part of the poem would express feelings towards their partner.

Much like with tea, there were a number of rituals and events surrounding the composition, presentation, and judgment of waka. There were two types of waka party that produced occasional poetry: Utakai and Uta-awase. Utakai was a party in which all participants wrote a waka and recited them. Utakai derived from Shikai, Kanshi party and was held in occasion people gathered like seasonal party for the New Year, some celebrations for a newborn baby, a birthday, or a newly built house. Utaawase was a contest in two teams. Themes were determined and a chosen poet from each team wrote a waka for a given theme. The judge appointed a winner for each theme and gave points to the winning team. The team which received the largest sum was the winner. The first recorded Utaawase was held in around 885. At first, Utaawase was playful and mere entertainment, but as the poetic tradition deepened and grew, it turned into a serious aesthetic contest, with considerably more formality.

== Poets ==
- Ochiai Naobumi (1861–1903)
- Masaoka Shiki (1867–1902)
- Yosano Akiko (1878–1942)
- Ishikawa Takuboku (1886–1912)
- Saitō Mokichi (1882–1953)
- Itō Sachio (1864–1913)
- Kitahara Hakushū (1885–1942)
- Suiko Sugiura (1885–1960)
- Nagatsuka Takashi (1879–1915)
- Okamoto Kanoko (1889–1939)
- Wakayama Bokusui (1885–1928)
- Orikuchi Shinobu (1887–1953) under the pseudonym Shaku Choku
- Jun Fujita (1888–1963)
- Kenji Miyazawa (1896-1933)
- Terayama Shuji (1935–1983)
- Tawara Machi (born 1962)
- Yukio Mishima (1925–1970)
- Akiko Baba (born 1928)
- Fumiko Nakajō (1922–1954)
- Nakajima Utako (1844–1903)
- Chūya Nakahara (1907–1937)

== See also ==
- Gogyōshi
- Gogyōka
- Honkadori
- Japanese language
- Japanese phonology
- List of Japanese language poets
- List of National Treasures of Japan (writings)
- Ryūka

== Bibliography ==
- Keene, Donald, Dawn to the West: Japanese Literature of the Modern Era - Poetry, Drama, Criticism (A History of Japanese Literature, Volume 4), Columbia University Press, 1999

=== Modern anthologies ===
- Nakano, Jiro, Outcry from the Inferno: Atomic Bomb Tanka Anthology, Honolulu, Hawaii, Bamboo Ridge Press 1995 ISBN 0-910043-38-8 [104 pp. 103 tanka by 103 poets]
- Shiffert, Edith, and Yuki Sawa, editors and translators, Anthology of Modern Japanese Poetry, Rutland, Vermont, Tuttle, 1972
- Ueda, Makoto, Modern Japanese Tanka: An Anthology, NY: Columbia University Press, 1996 ISBN 0-231-10432-4 cloth ISBN 978-0-231-10433-3 pbk [257 pp. 400 tanka by 20 poets]

=== Modern translations ===
- Ogura Hyakunin Isshu. 100 Poems by 100 Poets. Trans. Clay MacCauley. Appendix
- Baba, Akiko. Heavenly Maiden Tanka. Trans. Hatsue Kawamura and Jane Reichhold. Gualala CA:AHA Books, 1999
- Nakajō, Fumiko. Breasts of Snow. Trans. Hatsue Kawamura and Jane Reichhold. Tokyo:The Japan Times Press, 2004
- Saito, Fumi. White Letter Poems. Trans. Hatsue Kawamura and Jane Reichhold. Gualala CA: AHA Books, 1998
