= Modern Chinese loanwords in Japanese =

Modern words borrowed from Chinese varieties into Japanese

Modern Chinese loanwords in Japanese are words borrowed into the Japanese language from Chinese varieties in the modern period. The National Institute for Japanese Language and Linguistics (NINJAL) classifies words introduced from China in the modern period as gairaigo (foreign loanwords); examples in its corpus documentation include クーニャン (kūnyan, "young unmarried woman"), シュウマイ (shūmai, "steamed meat dumplings"), and メンツ (mentsu, "face" or "prestige").

== Classification ==
Japanese vocabulary is conventionally divided by origin into native Japanese words (wago), Sino-Japanese vocabulary (kango), foreign loanwords (gairaigo), and hybrids. NINJAL's guidelines for the Balanced Corpus of Contemporary Written Japanese classify words introduced from China during or before the early modern period, together with wasei-kango coined in Japan, as kango, and words introduced from China in the modern period as gairaigo. The Sekai Daihyakka Jiten uses pronunciation to distinguish two forms of borrowing: words from modern Chinese read with Sino-Japanese pronunciations can be classed as kango, whereas loans retaining modern Chinese pronunciations fall outside that category.

== Regional origins ==
Some dictionary etymologies identify a particular regional pronunciation. A Kōdansha dictionary of beverages identifies ヤムチャ (yamucha, "tea with dim sum") as a Cantonese or Hong Kong reading, while Nobuhisa Tsuji's entry on Cantonese in the Sekai Daihyakka Jiten lists シューマイ (shūmai, "steamed meat dumplings") and チャーシュー (chāshū, "roast pork") as Japanese loans from Cantonese. The same encyclopedia suggests that ビーフン (bīfun, "rice vermicelli") acquired its name when introduced from Southern Min-speaking Taiwan, and traces the pronunciation of ギョーザ (gyōza, "dumplings") to Shandong. Mark Irwin lists alternative proposed sources for gyōza, including Hakka Chinese, Chinese spoken in Shandong, and the non-Chinese Manchu language.

== Transmission ==
The historical examples in the Seisenban Nihon Kokugo Daijiten give different early dates for widely used food terms. Wantan ("meat-filled dumplings") appears in the 1906 household encyclopedia Nihon katei hyakka jii (日本家庭百科事彙), pītan ("preserved duck egg") in Jun'ichirō Tanizaki's 1917 Majutsushi, and shūmai in the 1928 terminology dictionary Onbiki seikai kindai shin'yōgo jiten (音引正解近代新用語辞典). Rāmen ("noodles in soup") appears in the 1930 Modan jiten and a 1931 work by Naoyuki Ichinose, chāhan ("fried rice") in Roppa Furukawa's diary for 11 June 1939, and chāshū in Nagai Kafū's 1946 Odoriko. The dictionary's usage history records that rāmen and cut noodles were introduced during the Meiji era, when they were known by names including シナそば (shina soba, "Chinese noodles") and eaten mainly in Chinatowns. After the Second World War, 中華そば (chūka soba, "Chinese noodles") and ラーメン (rāmen) coexisted; the latter became the more usual name from the Shōwa 30s (1955–1964).

Cooking magazines also document changes in the Japanese names of Chinese dishes. A 2021 study by Yukihiro Kawaguchi examined 271 available issues of Ryōri no tomo (料理の友) from 1914 to 1943 and 642 issues of Kyō no Ryōri (きょうの料理) from 1958 to 2019. In the sampled Ryōri no tomo recipes for Chinese food, 88.8% placed the Chinese dish name first, often accompanied by kana (Japanese phonetic characters) indicating its Chinese pronunciation and by a Japanese explanation. In Kyō no Ryōri, Japanese names gradually predominated: the proportion of recipes accompanied by Chinese names fell from 71.2% in the 1970s to 23.2% in the 1980s and 2.2% in the 1990s. The study placed kanji dish names already in common use, such as gyōza, in a separate category of established terms. The sources of the kana pronunciation guides also differed. Those in Ryōri no tomo included standard Chinese—a category exemplified today by Putonghua—Cantonese and Wu Chinese, whereas a larger proportion of those in Kyō no Ryōri were based on standard Chinese.

In Kyō no Ryōri, chāhan, gyōza, wantan and shūmai recurred from the 1970s onward. From the 1980s onward, chāhan and gyōza held the top two places in the study's counts of dishes featured in each decade. Explanations of condiment names also changed. When the magazine published Chen Kenmin's recipe for mapo tofu in February 1971, it explained the ingredients of doubanjiang, a fermented broad-bean paste with chili, and suggested substitutes if it was unavailable. In Harumi Kurihara's June 2015 recipe, it simply gave トーバンジャン (tōbanjan) as the reading of 豆板醤, without further explanation.

In film terminology, the Sekai Daihyakka Jiten records クンフー映画 (kunfū eiga, "kung fu films") as the Japanese name for Hong Kong films centered on Chinese martial arts. The alternative カンフー映画 (kanfū eiga) uses the English pronunciation of the Wade–Giles spelling kung fu. Yoshitsugu Nagata notes that the boom following the 1973 release of Enter the Dragon was known in Japan at the time as a "karate film" boom, which he attributes to カンフー (kanfū, "kung fu") not yet being in general use.

== Examples ==
| Field | Chinese form | Japanese form | Kanji spelling | English meaning | Source and notes |
|---|---|---|---|---|---|
| Food and condiments | 雲吞 | ワンタン (wantan) | 雲呑 | "wonton": meat-filled dumplings | Listed as a Chinese loan; recorded in a 1906 household encyclopedia. |
| Food and condiments | 皮蛋 | ピータン (pītan) | 皮蛋 | "century egg": preserved duck egg | Chinese loan with a dictionary example dated 1917. |
| Food and condiments | 燒賣 | シューマイ (shūmai) | 焼売 | "shumai": steamed meat dumplings | Chinese loan recorded in a 1928 terminology dictionary. |
| Food and condiments | 拉麵 | ラーメン (rāmen) | 拉麺 | "ramen" | Chinese loan referring in Japanese to Chinese-style noodles served in soup. |
| Food and condiments | 炒飯 | チャーハン (chāhan) | 炒飯 | "fried rice" | Chinese loan with a dictionary example dated 1939. |
| Food and condiments | 叉燒 | チャーシュー (chāshū) | 叉焼 | "roast pork"; also simmered pork in Japanese usage | Chinese loan with a dictionary example dated 1946. |
| Food and condiments | 餃子 | ギョーザ (gyōza) | 餃子 | "dumplings" filled with meat and vegetables | The Sekai Daihyakka Jiten traces its pronunciation to a reading from Shandong. |
| Food and condiments | 米粉 | ビーフン (bīfun) | 米粉 | "rice vermicelli": thin rice noodles | The Sekai Daihyakka Jiten suggests that the name came through Southern Min-speaking Taiwan. |
| Food and condiments | 榨菜 | ザーサイ (zāsai) | 搾菜 | "pickled mustard stem" | A Chinese loan for preserved swollen-stem mustard. |
| Food and condiments | 豆瓣醬 | トウバンジャン (tōbanjan) | 豆板醤 | "doubanjiang": fermented broad-bean paste with chili | A Chinese loan for a fermented paste made with broad beans, chili peppers and salt. |
| Food and condiments | 青椒肉絲 | チンジャオロース (chinjaorōsu) | 青椒肉絲 | "shredded pork with green peppers" | Listed as the name of a Chinese dish. |
| Food and condiments | 回鍋肉 | ホイコーロー (hoikōrō) | 回鍋肉 | "twice-cooked pork": pork boiled, then stir-fried with vegetables | Listed as the name of a Sichuan dish. |
| Food and condiments | 棒棒雞 | バンバンジー (banbanjī) | 棒棒鶏 | "bang bang chicken": shredded chicken with a spicy sesame sauce | Listed as the name of a Sichuan dish. |
| Tea culture | 飲茶 | ヤムチャ (yamucha) | 飲茶 | "yum cha": a light meal of tea and dim sum | A Chinese term for the practice of drinking tea with dim sum. |
| Tea culture | 烏龍茶 | ウーロン茶 (ūroncha) | 烏龍茶 | "oolong tea" | A Chinese tea name written with a mixture of katakana and kanji. |
| Games | 麻雀 | マージャン (mājan) | 麻雀 | "mahjong": a tile game | The name of a game introduced from China. |
| Everyday and cultural terms | 面子、姑娘 | メンツ (mentsu), クーニャン (kūnyan) | 面子、姑娘 | For mentsu, "face" or "prestige"; for kūnyan, "young unmarried woman" | NINJAL lists both as modern foreign loans from China. |
| Everyday and cultural terms | 功夫 | カンフー (kanfū) | 功夫 | "kung fu": Chinese martial arts | A Chinese loan for Chinese martial arts. |

== Meanings ==
Some loans differ from their Chinese counterparts in what they refer to, how a dish is prepared, or their extended meanings. In Mandarin Chinese, 拉麵 (lāmiàn) can refer either to the process of repeatedly stretching and folding dough by hand or to the noodles made in this way. Japanese ラーメン (rāmen) usually refers to a dish of Chinese-style noodles in broth seasoned with soy sauce, salt, miso or other ingredients. Mandarin 叉燒 (chāshāo, "char siu") refers to Cantonese-style meat roasted after being coated with sauce, whereas in Japan チャーシュー (chāshū) can also refer to pork cooked in an oven or simmered in a broth seasoned with soy sauce and other ingredients. Japanese チャーハン (chāhan, "fried rice") is also called 焼き飯 (yakimeshi); the Nipponica encyclopedia lists the latter as a synonym for fried rice and also gives the meaning of rice balls grilled until browned.

Mandarin 面子 (miànzi) has meanings including face, reputation and consideration for personal relationships. Japanese メンツ (mentsu) likewise means face or prestige, but can also refer to the players in a mahjong game. The Digital Daijisen records an extension of this latter sense to the members of a gathering more generally. Mandarin 功夫 (gōngfu) can mean martial arts, skill or accomplishment, as well as time or effort; the Digital Daijisen defines Japanese カンフー (kanfū) as Chinese martial arts and gives クンフー (kunfū) as an alternative reading.

== Adaptation in Japanese ==
Japanese syllable structure affects the pronunciation of loanwords. Haruo Kubozono's analysis, illustrated with English loans, describes the insertion of vowels to break up consonant clusters or adapt syllables ending in consonants. A single word may be written in katakana (a Japanese phonetic script), kanji, or a mixture of both, as in ピータン／皮蛋 (pītan, "century egg"), ギョーザ／餃子 (gyōza, "dumplings"), and ウーロン茶／烏龍茶 (ūroncha, "oolong tea"). Some words have variant readings or kanji spellings. The Digital Daijisen gives ザーサイ (zāsai) and ザーツァイ (zātsai) for pickled mustard stem, with the spellings 搾菜 and 榨菜; Kōdansha's culinary dictionary lists チンジャオロースー (chinjaorōsū) as an alternative to チンジャオロース (chinjaorōsu, "shredded pork with green peppers").

Japan's Agency for Cultural Affairs recommends ン (n) for the moraic nasal, small ッ for a geminate (doubled) consonant, and, in principle, ー for long vowels in katakana loanwords. The kana ャ (ya), ュ (yu) and ョ (yo) used in yōon (contracted syllables) are also written small, though some conventional spellings are allowed. The guidelines are intended for general use, including legislation, official documents, newspapers and broadcasting, not for specialist fields, personal writing or proper names.

== See also ==
- Gairaigo
- Sino-Japanese vocabulary
- Sino-Japanese readings
- Go-on
- Kan-on
- Tō-on
- Japanese loanwords in Chinese
- Wasei-kango
