= Japanese loanwords in Chinese =

Words and meanings borrowed from Japanese into Chinese

Japanese loanwords in Chinese are words, word meanings, or word-forming elements introduced from Japanese into the various varieties of Chinese. Because written Chinese and Japanese both make use of Chinese characters (known in Japanese as kanji), many expressions entered Chinese through graphic borrowing: they kept their Japanese character forms while being read with Chinese pronunciations. Other loans were adapted phonetically on the basis of their Japanese pronunciations.

Between the late 19th and early 20th centuries, Chinese absorbed a large number of academic and social terms from Japanese. Japanese loans include newly coined Japanese character compounds, classical Chinese expressions that acquired modern meanings in Japanese, native Japanese words written with characters, and European loanwords transmitted via Japanese. Some modern terms had first appeared in Chinese translations of Western learning or in English-Chinese dictionaries; after reaching Japan, they were selected, defined, or reworked before returning to Chinese through Japanese publications. Following the launch of Reform and Opening Up in mainland China, Japanese popular culture, commerce, and mass media brought another wave of new words into mainland Chinese usage.

== Scope ==
"Japanese loanwords in Chinese" are defined by the borrowing relationship through which words pass from Japanese into Chinese. Wasei-kango (Japanese-made Chinese words), by contrast, are defined by how they were formed within Japanese; the subset of wasei-kango that later entered Chinese falls within the scope of this article. Beyond wasei-kango, Chinese has also borrowed native Japanese words (wago) written in kanji, non-Chinese loanwords in Japanese (gairaigo), and words transcribed according to their Japanese pronunciations.

Wasei-kango and Japanese loanwords in Chinese
Wasei-kango		
	Japanese loanwords in Chinese	
Examples not used in modern Chinese	Overlap between the two	Other Japanese loanwords in Chinese
Two-character Sino-Japanese words of Japanese origin not used in modern Chinese.	Character compounds formed in Japan as translation equivalents and later absorbed into Chinese.	Graphic borrowings of wago or gairaigo written in kanji, and words transcribed from Japanese pronunciations.

Examples
Japanese spelling and romanization	Chinese spelling and Mandarin pinyin	English meaning
Examples not used in modern Chinese
交番 kōban	Not used in modern Chinese	Police box
改札 kaisatsu	Not used in modern Chinese	Ticket inspection or ticket gate
祝日 shukujitsu	Not used in modern Chinese	National holiday
Overlap between the two
哲学 tetsugaku	哲學 zhéxué	Philosophy
音符 onpu	音符 yīnfú	Musical note
音域 on'iki	音域 yīnyù	Musical range
Other Japanese loanwords in Chinese
取り締まり torishimari	取締 qǔdì	To crack down on or to ban
手続き tetsuzuki	手續 shǒuxù	Procedure
倶楽部 kurabu	俱樂部 jùlèbù	Club
カラオケ karaoke	卡拉OK kǎlā OK	Karaoke

Studies differ on what to count as a loanword: some restrict the category to phonemic loans, whereas others include graphic borrowings of Japanese character words, and works also diverge on whether words formed by translating meaning should be counted. Because Chinese and Japanese both use Chinese characters, modern lexical exchange between the two languages involved the retention of existing word forms, shifts in meaning, and the return of earlier translation terms. Word counts therefore vary across studies. Gu Jiangping notes, for instance, that A Dictionary of Loanwords in Chinese (《漢語外來詞詞典》, Hànyǔ Wàiláicí Cídiǎn) marks 839 items as being of Japanese origin, whereas Gu's own study collected 2,250 items.

== History ==
=== Early transmission ===
In premodern lexical exchange between China and Japan, words flowed mainly from Chinese into Japanese, along with a small amount of transmission in the opposite direction. Gu Jiangping examines Japanese loanwords across three periods: premodern, the late Qing and early Republican era, and the contemporary era. In the 19th century, books on Western learning, periodicals, and English-Chinese dictionaries compiled by missionaries in China and their Chinese collaborators transmitted a body of character-based translation terms to Japan; Japanese translators also selected expressions from classical Chinese texts or coined new equivalents from Chinese character morphemes. Some of these terms gained currency in Japanese publications, where they took on the meanings of specific Western concepts before being introduced into late Qing Chinese.

=== Late Qing to early Republican China period ===
After the First Sino-Japanese War, the number of Chinese students studying in Japan rose. Japanese books, textbooks, periodicals, and translations were translated or adapted in large numbers, bringing Japanese terminology in politics, law, the social sciences, and the natural sciences into Chinese publishing and education. Periodicals founded in Japan by Liang Qichao and others, books translated by Chinese students in Japan, and textbooks compiled for new-style schools all served as channels through which these expressions spread.

=== Mid-20th century onward ===
Some modern loanwords were later displaced through competition among rival translations. For example, Japanese rendered the English word logic as 論理 (ronri, Mandarin lùnlǐ, "logic"), whereas from around the 1950s onward Chinese largely adopted the phonemic loan 邏輯 ("logic"). Peng Guoyue explains this shift in terms of competition among synonymous translations and the phonetic similarity of 論理 (Mandarin lùnlǐ) and 倫理 (Mandarin lúnlǐ, "ethics"). After 1978, Chinese in mainland China again absorbed new words from Japanese. Examining materials from 1979 to 2002, Luo Qixiang analyzes the forms, meanings, routes of transmission, and usage of words such as 人氣 (Japanese ninki, Mandarin rénqì, "popularity") and 空港 (Japanese kūkō, Mandarin kōnggǎng, "airport"). Li Yini and Xu Jinghong examine Japanese loanwords in Chinese internet slang, grouping their forms into phonemic loans, meaning-based translations, graphic borrowings of kanji, borrowings of Latin-letter abbreviations, borrowings of distinctive grammatical constructions, and expressions drawn from specific anime and manga works.

== Modes of borrowing ==
Japanese loanwords enter Chinese primarily through graphic borrowing (借形, jièxíng, "borrowing the written form"), which adopts the original written representation of a word, and phonemic borrowing (借音, jièyīn, "borrowing the sound"), which transcribes its pronunciation. In her study of Taiwanese Mandarin, Karen Steffen Chung uses these two mechanisms as her primary classification and discusses how Chinese characters, the Latin script, and Chinese semantic components combine in the borrowing process. The sections below provide examples of graphic and phonemic borrowings, with Japanese pronunciations noted in kana and romanization.

=== Graphic borrowing ===
Chinese can borrow both the character forms and meanings of Japanese kanji vocabulary, or adopt the kanji spellings of native Japanese words (wago) and loanwords from third languages (gairaigo); when native Japanese words are borrowed, their accompanying okurigana (kana accompanying kanji) may be omitted. The table below lists the orthography, pronunciation, and borrowing process of these words written in kanji. Wasei-kango (Japanese-coined Sino-Japanese words) are kanji compounds read with Sino-Japanese on'yomi pronunciations, whereas ateji represents a specific mode of kanji orthography. For example, 倶楽部 (kurabu, "club") is classified as a gairaigo in the Japanese lexicon, yet it is written using phonetically assigned kanji.

Borrowing the written forms and meanings of Japanese words
Chinese term	Japanese source and pronunciation	Source category and orthography	Borrowing process
哲學 (Mandarin: zhéxué, "philosophy")	哲学 (てつがく, tetsugaku)	Wasei-kango: newly coined word form	Coined in Japanese as a translation equivalent for English philosophy, and subsequently absorbed into Chinese.
音符 (Mandarin: yīnfú, "musical note")	音符 (おんぷ, onpu)	Wasei-kango: translated musical term	Formed in Japan as a translated musical term before entering Chinese. It refers to a symbol in musical notation indicating pitch and duration.
經濟 (Mandarin: jīngjì, "economy")	経済 (けいざい, keizai)	Wasei-kango (broad sense): classical word form acquiring a new meaning	Retained an existing classical Chinese word form, acquired a modern meaning in Japanese when used to translate English economy, and was then borrowed back into Chinese with this new sense.
文化 (Mandarin: wénhuà, "culture")	文化 (ぶんか, bunka)	Wasei-kango (broad sense): classical word form acquiring a new meaning	Retained a classical Chinese word form, acquired a modern meaning in Japanese corresponding to culture, and was borrowed into Chinese with this new sense.
便當 (Mandarin: biàndāng, "boxed meal")	弁当 (べんとう, bentō)	Wasei-kango	Chung lists it in Taiwanese Mandarin as a term for a boxed meal.
寫真 (Mandarin: xiězhēn, "photograph")	写真 (しゃしん, shashin)	Wasei-kango (in Chow Sing-lai's classification)	Refers to photographs in general in Japanese. As recorded by Chung for Taiwanese Mandarin, its usage centers more on artistic portrait photography and photo books (寫真集, xiězhēnjí), undergoing semantic narrowing after borrowing.
取消 (Mandarin: qǔxiāo, "to cancel")	取り消し (とりけし, torikeshi)	Wago	The kanji spelling 取消 of the native Japanese word was borrowed into Chinese and retained.
取締 (Mandarin: qǔdì, "to crack down; to ban")	取り締まり (とりしまり, torishimari)	Wago	The kanji spelling of the native Japanese word was borrowed into Chinese, dropping the okurigana り (ri) and まり (mari) while retaining 取締.
見習 (Mandarin: jiànxí, "probation; apprenticeship")	見習い (みならい, minarai)	Wago	The kanji spelling 見習 of the native Japanese word was borrowed into Chinese and read with Chinese character pronunciations.
手續 (Mandarin: shǒuxù, "procedure; formality")	手続き (てつづき, tetsuzuki)	Wago	Written as 手續き in traditional Japanese kanji forms; upon borrowing, the okurigana き (ki) was dropped to form 手續.
俱樂部 (Mandarin: jùlèbù, "club")	倶楽部 (クラブ, kurabu)	Gairaigo (ateji orthography)	English club first entered Japanese and was written with phonetic ateji kanji, whose character form was then adopted by Chinese.

=== Phonemic borrowing ===
In addition to selecting Chinese characters to transcribe Japanese pronunciations, phonemic loans may attach a Chinese morpheme that specifies the semantic category of the referent, or combine Chinese characters with letters of the Latin alphabet.

Examples of phonemic and hybrid borrowings
Borrowing form	Chinese term	Japanese source and pronunciation	Borrowing process
Phonemic transcription in Chinese characters	榻榻米 (Mandarin: tàtàmǐ, "tatami mat")	畳 (たたみ, tatami)	Phonemically transcribed from the Japanese pronunciation, referring to thick grass mats used as flooring in Japanese-style rooms.
Phonemic transcription in Chinese characters	歐巴桑 (Mandarin: ōubāsāng, "older woman")	おばあさん (obāsan)	Phonemically transcribed from the Japanese sound. In Taiwanese Mandarin usage as recorded by Chung, it refers to an older woman.
Phonemic transcription in Chinese characters	一級棒 (Mandarin: yījíbàng, "first-rate; excellent")	一番 (いちばん, ichiban)	Characters selected to match the Japanese pronunciation, meaning "the best" or "outstanding", while the Chinese character 棒 (bàng, "great; terrific") simultaneously contributes a commendatory sense.
Phonemic transcription in Chinese characters	仙貝 (Mandarin: xiānbèi, "senbei; rice cracker")	煎餅 (せんべい, senbei)	Transcribed by selecting different characters to match the Japanese pronunciation, used to denote Japanese-style rice crackers.
Phonemic transcription plus semantic component	烏龍麵 (Mandarin: wūlóngmiàn), 烏冬麵 (Mandarin: wūdōngmiàn; "udon noodles")	うどん (udon)	Adds 麵 (miàn, "noodles") to the phonemic transcription to indicate the type of food. Chung records two forms: 烏龍麵 in Taiwan and 烏冬麵 in Hong Kong.
Hybrid of Chinese characters and Latin script	卡拉OK (Mandarin: kǎlā OK, "karaoke")	カラオケ (karaoke)	卡拉 (kǎlā) transcribes the first half of the Japanese word, while the second half is represented by the Latin letters "OK". The Japanese term is a compound of 空 (kara, "empty") and オケ (oke), a clipped form of the Japanese loanword from English orchestra.

=== Borrowing of word-forming elements ===
Japanese-derived vocabulary has also introduced or reinforced morphemes that participate productively in further word formation. Forms such as －主義 (-zhǔyì, "-ism"), －化 (-huà, "-ize; -ification"), and －性 (-xìng, "-ity; -ness") function as affixes or affix-like elements and combine with other Chinese morphemes to coin new words. This phenomenon is likewise present in contemporary borrowings. Chung cites －族 (-zú, "group") in Taiwanese Mandarin to illustrate how the Japanese use of 族 (ぞく, zoku) to denote a category of people has been applied to Chinese coinages such as 電腦族 (diànnǎozú, "computer users") and 租屋族 (zūwūzú, "renters"). She also discusses elements such as －風 (-fēng, "-style") and －屋 (-wū, "shop") that continue to generate new words within Chinese.

== Changes after borrowing ==
After entering Chinese, Japanese words can undergo changes in written form, pronunciation, lexical meaning, and scope of use. Gu Jiangping categorizes such adaptations into visible formal modifications, such as the dropping of word endings and the omission of particles, and covert modifications, including morpheme substitution, adjustments in word order, semantic shift, and changes in stylistic or evaluative coloring. At the phonological level, graphic loans are generally read using the local Chinese pronunciation of the characters in the borrowing region. Phonetic loans, by contrast, are adapted to the local phonological system. For instance, Nien Fu-chen examines Japanese loanwords in Taiwanese Hokkien using a corpus and Optimality Theory, noting that most source segments correspond to substitute segments on a roughly one-to-one basis, while the few one-to-two correspondences involve either phonological constraints in Taiwanese Hokkien or requirements to preserve Japanese phonetic features.

== Usage ==
=== Taiwan ===
Taiwan was under Japanese rule from 1895 to 1945, during which time a large volume of Japanese vocabulary entered Taiwanese Hokkien. Ting Chin-chang focuses on Taiwanese Hokkien in examining its Japanese loanwords; Chung investigates Taiwanese Mandarin, distinguishing words retained from the period of Japanese rule from newer post-1945 borrowings, and discussing pathways through which certain lexical items entered Taiwanese Mandarin via Taiwanese Hokkien.

=== Northeast China ===
Japanese colonial activities in Northeast China and the Manchukuo period also facilitated contact between Japanese and local varieties of Chinese. Citing earlier studies, Chung notes that words formerly used in the region included 町 (from Japanese 町, machi, "town"), 案內 (from Japanese 案内, annai, "information"), and 放送局 (from Japanese 放送局, hōsōkyoku, "broadcasting station"); Bai Xiaomeng, Zhang Shouxiang, and Kōga Masahiro have also studied Japanese loanwords in the dialects of Northeast China.

=== Internet slang ===
In contemporary mass communication, Li Yini and Xu Jinghong link Japanese loanwords in Chinese internet slang to the circulation of Japanese anime, video games, and other cultural products, as well as to younger user communities, discussing borrowing methods such as phonetic transcription and graphic borrowing of kanji.

== Competition among modern translated terms ==
In the late Qing period, Zhang Zhidong, Yan Fu, Lin Shu, Zhang Binglin, and Peng Wenzu criticized new terminology originating from Japan, while Yan Fu coined alternative translations or modified Japanese translated terms. Huang Ko-wu summarizes the related debates as the "war of neologisms" (新名詞之戰; Standard Mandarin: xīn míngcí zhī zhàn) to examine the competition between Yan Fu's translations and Japanese translated terms, as well as efforts to standardize terminology in the late Qing. The table below lists several of Yan Fu's translations alongside the competing translations that later came into general use:

Competition involving Yan Fu's translated terms
Original foreign word	Yan Fu's translation	Later standard translation
nerve	涅伏 (Standard Mandarin: nièfú, phonetic transcription)	神經 (Standard Mandarin: shénjīng, Japanese shinkei)
organism	官品 (Standard Mandarin: guānpǐn)	有機體 (Standard Mandarin: yǒujītǐ, Japanese yūkitai)
sociology	群學 (Standard Mandarin: qúnxué)	社會學 (Standard Mandarin: shèhuìxué, Japanese shakaigaku)

Comparing the terminology in the 1903 Xin Erya (新爾雅; New Erya) and the 1911 Putong Baike Xin Dacidian (普通百科新大辭典; New General Encyclopedic Dictionary), Huang Ko-wu points out that by the 1920s, Japanese translated terms had gained the upper hand in this competition. Nevertheless, some words were later superseded by translations from other sources; for example, both Yan Fu's translation míngxué (名學) and the Japanese translated term lùnlǐxué (論理學; Japanese ronrigaku) for the English word logic eventually gave way in modern Chinese to the phonetic loan luójí (邏輯).

== Etymological investigation ==
=== Development of modern vocabulary ===
Research on modern Sino-Japanese lexical exchange encompasses classical word forms in Chinese texts, new lexical meanings generated in the modern era, and the trajectories of words as they circulated across translated books, periodicals, and dictionaries. For example, Shen Guowei's work examines the mutual influence among Chinese translations of Western learning, English-Chinese dictionaries, and Japanese translated terms; an edited volume translated and compiled by Joshua A. Fogel brings together dedicated essays on terms such as gèrén (個人; Japanese kojin, "individual"), shèhuì (社會; Japanese shakai, "society"), zōngjiào (宗教; Japanese shūkyō, "religion"), zìyóu (自由; Japanese jiyū, "freedom"), quánlì (權利; Japanese kenri, "rights"), and kēxué (科學; Japanese kagaku, "science"), discussing the competition among translated terms and shifts in conceptual meaning. Classical attestations of homographic words and the origins of their modern meanings represent two distinct levels in etymological investigation. Because some Japanese loanwords adopted pre-existing word forms from Classical Chinese, while certain Chinese translated terms were adopted, standardized, or modified in Japan before returning to Chinese, studies in this area separately examine newly coined word forms, old words vested with new meanings, and the return of translated terms.

=== Identification of "new loanwords" ===
Regarding the identification of contemporary loanwords, Hou Renfeng and Yuan Wei compiled 430 words that existing studies had treated as having entered Chinese between 1978 and 2014, excluding proper nouns such as company and product names, personal names, place names, titles of films, television series, and books, and names of manga characters. The study verifies the date of introduction separately from etymological attribution: among the 430 words, 119 were already attested in Chinese prior to 1978, while etymological verification of the same set concluded that 44 are very likely native Chinese words. The authors also note that earlier attestations retrieved from corpora can indicate only an approximate period of appearance.

== See also ==
- Wasei-kango
- Reborrowing
- Sino-Japanese vocabulary
- Loanwords in Japanese
- Language contact
