= Wasei-kango =

Sino-Japanese words coined in Japan

Wasei-kango (和製漢語; lit. 'Japanese-made Chinese words') are Japanese words formed in Japan using Chinese characters and Chinese-style word-formation patterns, typically read using on'yomi (Sino-Japanese readings derived from Chinese pronunciations). The term kango (漢語) in this name refers to Sino-Japanese vocabulary, the lexical stratum associated with Chinese-derived character readings; this is a distinct concept from the Chinese language itself (also written 漢語 in Chinese).

In a narrow sense, wasei-kango refers primarily to new word forms coined in Japan through Chinese-character word formation. In a broader sense, scholarship also includes words that reuse existing Classical Chinese forms, either with grammatical and morphological structures in Japanese that differ from those in Chinese or with new meanings expressing foreign concepts. Such words appear throughout Japanese lexical history across the ancient, early modern, and modern periods. From the medieval period onward, Japanese society coined Sino-Japanese-read words for native institutions and everyday objects by shifting native Japanese readings (kun'yomi) to Sino-Japanese readings (on'yomi) or by adapting the usage of Chinese characters. From the late Edo period through the Meiji era, translators drew on Chinese translations of Western works and English–Chinese dictionaries compiled by missionaries in China while also coining or repurposing large numbers of Chinese-character words to render Western scholarship and modern institutions.

In the late 19th and early 20th centuries, large numbers of modern Japanese Chinese-character translation terms entered Chinese through Chinese students studying in Japan, translated books, and dictionaries, and spread into neighboring languages such as Korean and Vietnamese either through shared Chinese-character forms or via Chinese; their transmission, reception, and surrounding controversies are also subjects of study. Because East Asia has long shared a tradition of Chinese characters (the Sinosphere) and modern translation terms for Western learning circulated back and forth across the region, determining whether a given shared written form originated as an independent Japanese coinage, in Classical Chinese texts, or in Chinese translations of Western works often requires examining historical attestations, internal word formation, and pathways of transmission.

== Terminology ==
=== Classification within Japanese vocabulary ===
Japanese vocabulary is conventionally classified by origin into four strata (a classification known in Japanese lexicology as goshu, 語種 'word type'): native Japanese words (wago), Sino-Japanese vocabulary (kango), other foreign loanwords (gairaigo), and hybrid words (konshugo). Sino-Japanese vocabulary is generally read using on'yomi and consists mostly of words borrowed from Chinese, while words in this stratum formed in Japan are called wasei-kango. The lexical annotation guidelines of the National Institute for Japanese Language and Linguistics likewise place wasei-kango in the Sino-Japanese category, citing 大根 (daikon 'daikon radish') and 返事 (henji 'reply') as examples. Specifically, 大根 (daikon) was formed by shifting the reading of the kanji spelling for the native Japanese word おほね (modern reading: ōne) from kun'yomi (native Japanese reading) to on'yomi, whereas 哲学 (tetsugaku 'philosophy') was coined in the modern period to translate a Western concept.

Japanese dictionaries define wasei-kango as compound words (熟語, jukugo) formed in Japan by combining Chinese characters. Examining both word form and meaning helps determine which words were formed in Japan: the "Japanese-made" element can refer to original readings or kanji combinations formed in Japanese, and some studies also include words that reuse existing forms from Classical Chinese texts to translate foreign concepts, thereby acquiring new meanings in Japanese. Studies in lexical history examine the diverse ways words have been formed in Japan on the basis of word form, character readings, attestations in Classical Chinese texts, morphological structure, and semantic change.

=== Relationship to Japanese loanwords in Chinese ===
Wasei-kango are defined by their word formation within Japanese, whereas Japanese loanwords in Chinese are defined by their borrowing from Japanese into Chinese. Because the two categories are defined by different criteria, their scopes overlap only partially. Their intersection consists of wasei-kango formed in Japan and absorbed into Chinese, including modern translation terms such as 哲学 (tetsugaku; Chinese: 哲學, zhéxué 'philosophy'), 社会 (shakai; Chinese: 社會, shèhuì 'society'), 音符 (onpu; Chinese: 音符, yīnfú 'musical note'), and 音域 (on'iki; Chinese: 音域, yīnyù 'vocal or musical range'). The relationship between the two categories is shown below:

Wasei-kango and Japanese loanwords in Chinese
| | Wasei-kango | | |
| | | Japanese loanwords in Chinese | |
| | Not used in Chinese in the cited study | Overlap | Other Japanese loanwords in Chinese |
| Description | Two-character Japanese kanji words judged by native Chinese speakers as not used in modern Chinese | Kanji words formed in Japan (such as modern translation terms) and later absorbed into Chinese | Borrowings of written forms (graphic loans) from kanji-written native Japanese words (wago), as well as ateji (phonetic kanji spellings) and phonetic loans of foreign loanwords (gairaigo) in Japanese |
| Examples | 交番 (kōban 'police box'); 改札 (kaisatsu 'ticket gate / ticket inspection'); 祝日 (shukujitsu 'public holiday') | 哲學 (zhéxué; Japanese: 哲学, tetsugaku 'philosophy'); 音符 (yīnfú; Japanese: 音符, onpu 'musical note'); 音域 (yīnyù; Japanese: 音域, on'iki 'vocal or musical range') | Graphic borrowings of kanji-written wago: 場合 (chǎnghé; Japanese: 場合, baai 'occasion / situation'); 取消 (qǔxiāo; Japanese: 取り消し, torikeshi 'cancellation'); 取締 (qǔdì; Japanese: 取り締まり, torishimari 'crackdown / regulation'); 見習 (jiànxí; Japanese: 見習い, minarai 'apprenticeship / probation'); Gairaigo ateji graphic borrowings, phonetic loans, etc.: 瓦斯 (wǎsī; Japanese: 瓦斯 / ガス, gasu 'gas'); 俱樂部 (jùlèbù; Japanese: 倶楽部 / クラブ, kurabu 'club'); 卡拉OK (kǎlā OK; Japanese: 空オケ / カラオケ, karaoke 'karaoke') |
| Criterion | Defined by formation within Japanese | Meets both definitions | Defined by transmission into Chinese |

== History ==
=== Early word formation in Japan ===
Early Japanese writing was based on the borrowing of Chinese characters (kanji). Extant inscriptions possibly dating as early as the 5th century record Japanese personal and place names in kanji. Writing in Japanese spread more widely around the mid-7th century. Texts of the Old Japanese period used kanji both logographically to record native Japanese words according to character meaning and phonographically to record Japanese syllables using character readings. For instance, the Man'yōshū frequently mixed both methods; poem 886 in Volume 5 writes the native Japanese word (wago) for 'grass', kusa, phonographically as 久佐.

Through long-term use of kanji and reading of Chinese texts, Japanese society not only absorbed loanwords and morphemes from Chinese, but also used Chinese-derived character readings to coin new wasei-kango within Japan in line with native linguistic habits and institutional or everyday needs, or developed Japan-specific meanings for existing Chinese words. One method of word formation, attested since the medieval period, was to write a native Japanese word in kanji and switch from its native kun'yomi reading to the characters' on'yomi reading. Words such as 火事 (kaji 'conflagration, destructive fire') and 日当 (nittō 'daily allowance') belong to this category; 火事 (kaji) was formed by writing the native Japanese expression 火の事 (hi no koto lit. 'matter of fire') in kanji and adopting its on'yomi reading, while 日当 (nittō) was contracted and given an on'yomi reading from 日の手当 (hi no teate lit. 'allowance for the day').

Japanese legal codes and other documents also used kanji terms formed in Japan to denote native institutions, rights, and property relations. In an examination of 94 wasei-kango in the Goseibai Shikimoku (the 1232 legal code of the Kamakura shogunate), Rokurō Nakayama argues that many such terms arose and entered use during the Heian and Kamakura periods as the Ritsuryō system gradually broke down and power shifted to warrior society. Names of litigation documents in the code include 充文 (atebumi 'writ of assignment'), 問状 (monjō 'writ of inquiry'), and 譲状 (yuzurijō 'deed of transfer'). In the sphere of land control, he classifies the Sino-Japanese compounds 当知行 (tōchigyō 'effective land tenure') and 不知行 (fuchigyō 'non-exercise of land tenure') from this text as wasei-kango. 当知行 (tōchigyō) referred to actual control over land regardless of whether the holder possessed legitimate title, whereas in the Goseibai Shikimoku, 不知行 (fuchigyō) denoted a situation in which someone held the right to control an estate but was unable to exercise it for some reason. The word 落居 (rakkyo 'settlement, return to a normal state') is another example of a native Japanese word switched to an on'yomi reading; Nakayama holds that it was formed by applying on'yomi to the native verb 落ち居る (ochiiru 'to settle down').

Regarding the subsequent survival of this vocabulary, Nakayama observes that many land-control and litigation terms in the Goseibai Shikimoku were closely tied to medieval institutions and are rarely used in modern Japanese. Other terms in the code, such as 弁償 (benshō 'compensation'), 没収 (bosshū 'confiscation'), and 理不尽 (rifujin 'unreasonable, arbitrary'), continued in use into modern Japanese because they retained more general meanings or later developed senses connected with everyday life.

Alongside newly coined words, existing words from classical Chinese also underwent semantic shifts within Japan to meet changing social needs. For example, 扶持 (fuchi 'support; stipend'), which originally meant 'mutual assistance' in the Mencius, was used in the Goseibai Shikimoku for assistance from a powerful person and came to be used in Japan from the medieval period onward for helping a vulnerable person become self-supporting, providing financial support, or granting a stipend to maintain a retainer, leading Nakayama to classify it as a "Japanized Chinese word" (waka kango). From the late Sengoku period through the Edo period, 扶持 (fuchi) referred to the stipends of lower-ranking retainers, and in the Edo period it primarily denoted rice rations granted to certain samurai.

Japanese also used kanji to coin words for concepts, institutions, and things distinctive to Japan. Liu Ming and Kikichi Washio list 介錯 (kaishaku 'seconding at ritual suicide by beheading'), 芸者 (geisha 'traditional female entertainer'), and 三味線 (shamisen 'three-stringed lute') as examples of this type. Among these, Chen Liwei classifies 介錯 (kaishaku) under the category of wasei-kango formed through the "Japanization of kanji".

=== Modern translations of Western learning ===
From the 18th century onward, Japanese rangaku (Dutch learning) translators rendered Western scholarly concepts into kanji when translating Dutch books; for example, the 1774 anatomical work Kaitai Shinsho ('New Book of Anatomy'), translated from Dutch, used terms such as 神経 (shinkei 'nerve') for Western medical concepts, and Mitsukuri Genpo used 地質学 (chishitsugaku 'geology') when translating Dutch geological texts. Meanwhile, from the late Ming dynasty onward, Western missionaries in China introduced Western knowledge in written Chinese. By the 19th century, and especially from the Bakumatsu to the early Meiji era, Japan accelerated its absorption of Western knowledge along two parallel and intersecting paths: Japanese scholars translated directly from European and American texts and experimented with coining terms, while also importing Chinese-language translations of Western books and English–Chinese and Chinese–English dictionaries produced by missionaries in China and Qing translation institutions, adopting their Chinese-character translation terms directly or consulting them as references. Consequently, not all modern neologisms of this period were coined in Japan.

==== Rangaku translation ====
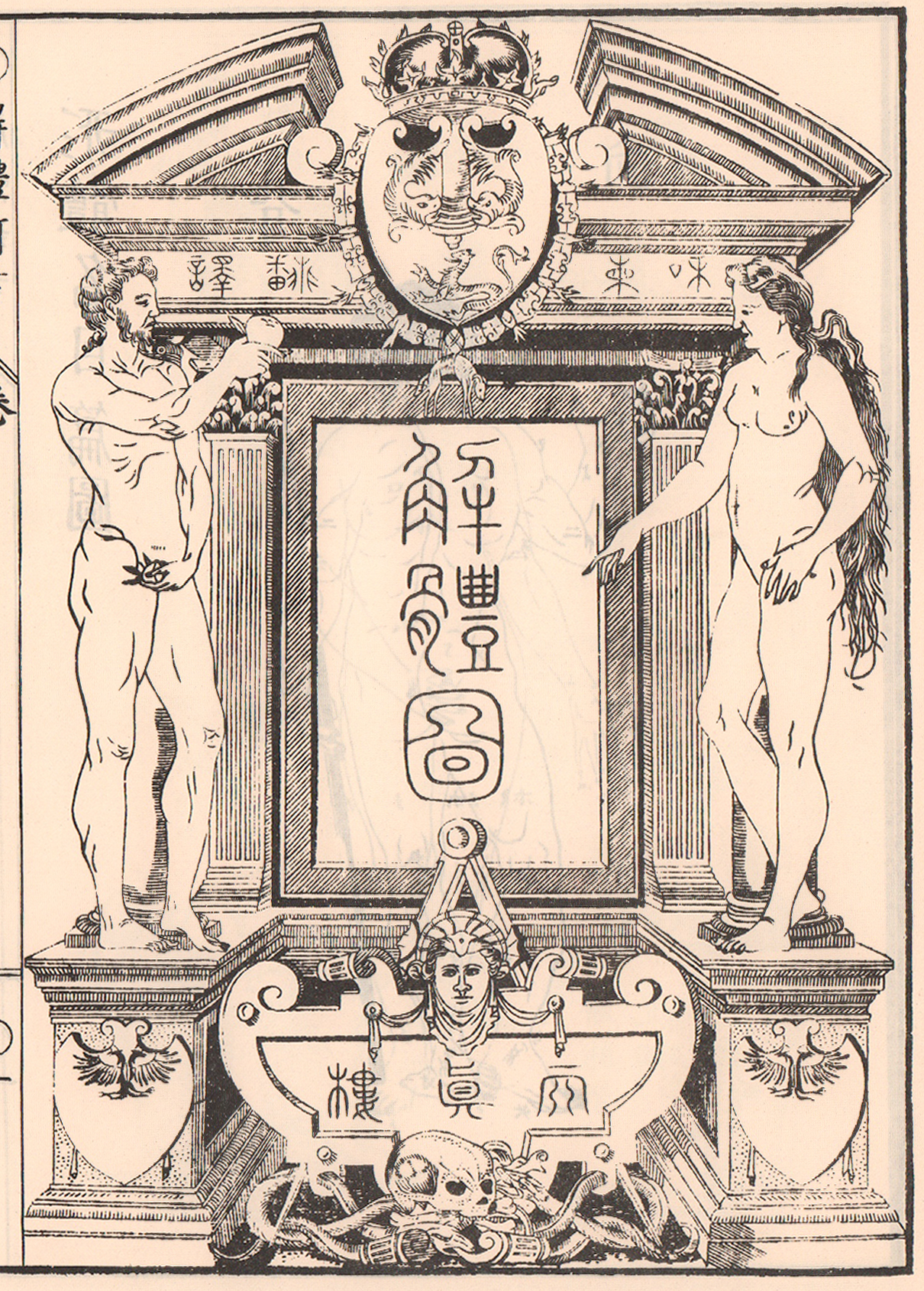
Frontispiece of the 1774 anatomical translation Kaitai Shinsho.

From the late Edo period through the Meiji era, Japanese translators rendering Western scholarly concepts repeatedly weighed phonetic transcription, borrowing existing terms, and coining new words. In Japanese medical translation, the concept of the nerve had previously been written phonetically after the Dutch pronunciation as 世奴 or rendered as 髄筋 (zuikin lit. 'marrow sinew'), which Teizō Ogawa traced back to Fang Yizhi's late-Ming work Wuli Xiaozhi (物理小識). Published in 1774, the Kaitai Shinsho ('New Book of Anatomy') by Sugita Genpaku and his colleagues used 神経 (shinkei 'nerve') to translate the Dutch word for nerve. Drawing on a letter from Genpaku to Takebe Seian, Ogawa explains that the term was coined by combining 神 (shin) from 神気 (shinki 'vital spirit') with 経 (kei) from 経脈 (keimyaku 'meridian vessels'). Genpaku noted in his letter that although traditional medicine spoke collectively of 経脈, individual vessels among the twelve meridians were referred to by 経 rather than 脈, and he chose 経 to distinguish nerves from pulsing blood vessels (動血脈). Although Genpaku wrote in the letter that the term had already been used in the Kaitai yakuzu (解體約圖) of 1773, Ogawa did not find 神経 in the extant copies of that work he examined.

Competing methods were also used to translate the names of chemical elements. Ensei ihō meibutsukō (遠西醫方名物考, 1822–1825), translated by Udagawa Shinsai and revised by Udagawa Yōan, already contained Yōan's coinages ending in 素 (-so 'element, principle'), including 酸素 (sanso 'oxygen', lit. 'acid element'), 水素 (suiso 'hydrogen', lit. 'water element'), and 炭素 (tanso 'carbon'); however, Aochi Rinsō did not adopt that work's 元素 (genso 'element') or those terms in Kikai kanran (氣海觀瀾, 1827), instead using 原質 (genshitsu, lit. 'original substance') for 'element' along with 酸質 (sanshitsu 'oxygen', lit. 'acid substance'), 水質 (suishitsu 'hydrogen', lit. 'water substance'), and 煤質 (baishitsu 'carbon', lit. 'soot substance'). Yōan also coined 窒素 (chisso 'nitrogen') and 塩素 (enso 'chlorine'), the latter becoming fixed relatively late.

From the Bakumatsu through the Meiji period, chemical literature used multiple notations simultaneously: alongside kanji phonetic transcriptions, attempts were made in the early Meiji years to transcribe European element names in katakana (a Japanese phonetic kana script), a practice that gradually gained wide adoption in the second decade of the Meiji era (1877–1886). By contrast, in his 1874 introductory chemistry primer Monowari no hashigo (ものわりのはしご, 'Ladder of Chemistry'), Shimizu Usaburō attempted to render most element names using native Japanese words (wago) written in hiragana (such as すみね, sumine, for carbon), an approach that failed to gain wide currency. Some Meiji chemists sought to name all nonmetallic elements using the suffix 素, though this pattern became fixed for only some elements. Separately, in chemistry and pharmacy, both 燐 (rin) and 燐素 (rinso) remained in use for phosphorus into the first half of the third decade of the Meiji era (1887–1891).

Udagawa Yōan's Seimi kaisō (舎密開宗), Part 1, Volume 2, showing 酸素 (sanso 'oxygen') on the right page and 水素 (suiso 'hydrogen') on the left page.

==== Chinese works on Western learning and bilingual dictionaries ====
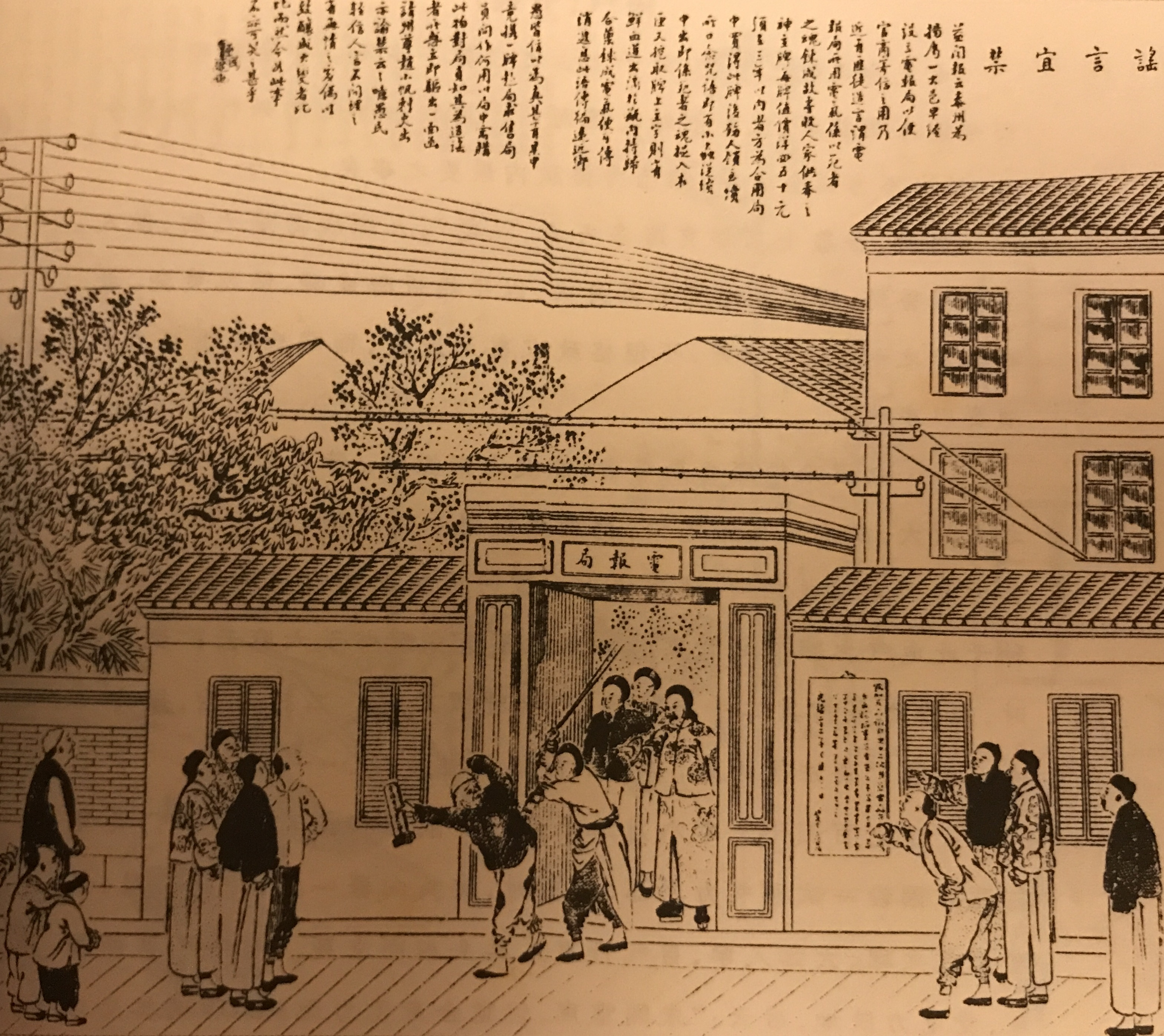
Modern terms such as 電報 ('telegraph') and 電氣 ('electricity') in the late-Qing lithographic illustrated periodical Dianshizhai Pictorial.

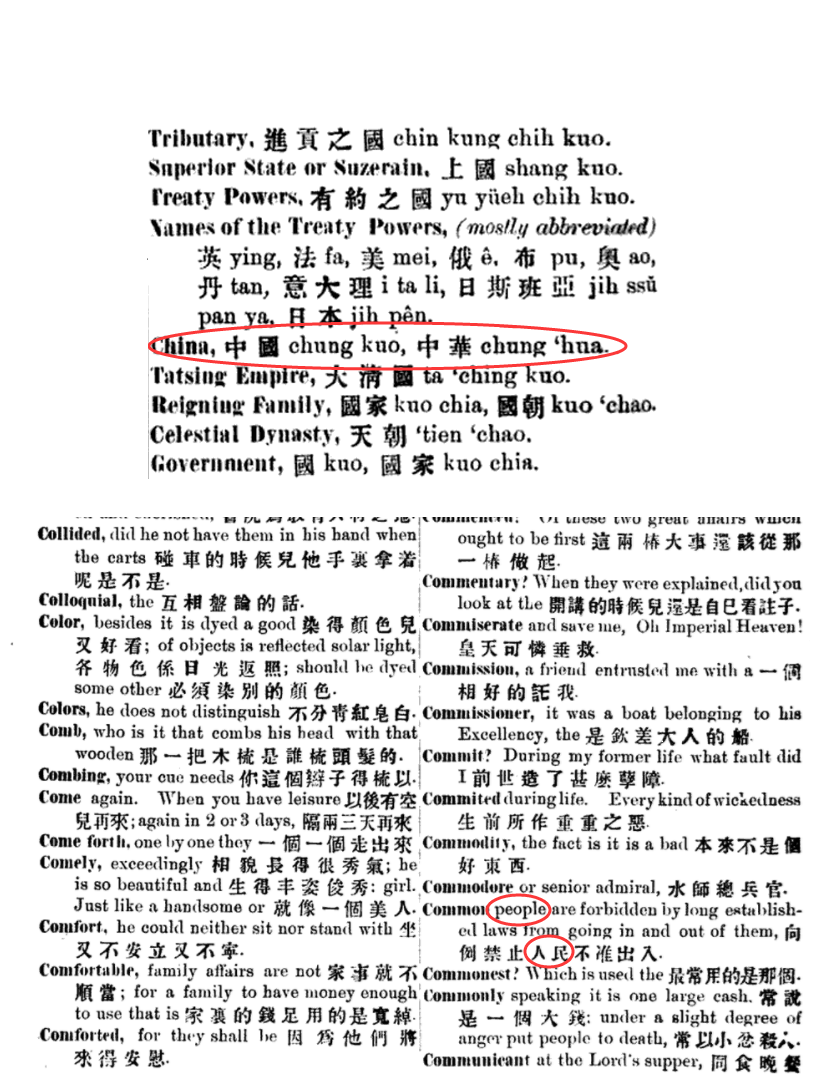
Two excerpts from the 1872 English–Chinese dictionary Vocabulary and Hand-Book of the Chinese Language (英華萃林韻府), matching "China" with 中國 and 中華, and "common people" with 人民.

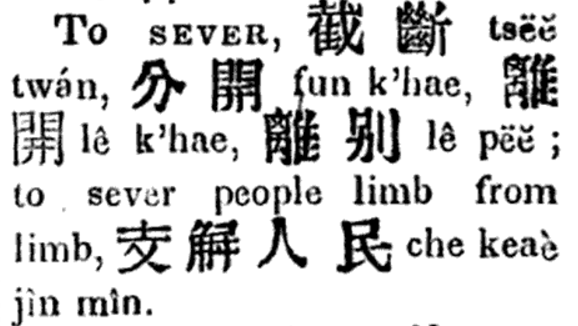
Page 1152 of Volume 2 (1848) of Medhurst's English and Chinese Dictionary (英華字典), matching "people" in an example sentence under "to sever" with 人民.

The treatise Bowu Xinbian (博物新編, Treatise on Natural Philosophy), written by the British medical missionary Benjamin Hobson to introduce modern Western science and published in an 1855 Shanghai edition, already contained modern vocabulary; Chen Liwei cites examples from the work including 氣壓 (qìyā 'atmospheric pressure'), 差異 (chāyì 'difference'), 流動 (liúdòng 'flow'), 牽引 (qiānyǐn 'traction'), 汽車 (qìchē 'steam train'), 電氣 (diànqì 'electricity'), 蒸氣 (zhēngqì 'steam'), 機器 (jīqì 'machine'), 軌道 (guǐdào 'track, orbit'), 幻影 (huànyǐng 'illusion, phantom'), 貨物 (huòwù 'freight, goods'), 電機 (diànjī 'electrical machine'), 航海 (hánghǎi 'navigation'), 隧道 (suìdào 'tunnel'), and 工程 (gōngchéng 'engineering'). After reaching Japan, Bowu Xinbian was adopted as an early Meiji science textbook, and Japanese-compiled works such as Butsuri kaitei (物理階梯) and Butsuri zenshi (物理全志) also drew on its translation terms. Chinese translations of Western books such as Bowu Xinbian, along with English–Chinese dictionaries, were subsequently transmitted to Japan, where Japanese absorbed new words and translation terms from them. Wilhelm Lobscheid's English and Chinese Dictionary (英華字典) had a particularly marked influence on the compilation of modern English–Japanese dictionaries and the formation of translation terms in Japan. This influence can be seen in a comparison of two English–Japanese dictionaries: the 1862 Eiwa taiyaku shūchin jisho (英和對譯袖珍辭書), published by the Yōsho Shirabesho, was based on an English–Dutch dictionary, relied primarily on the Dutch–Japanese dictionary Oranda jii (和蘭字彙), translated Dutch definitions into Japanese, and frequently explained meanings with short phrases; by contrast, the 1873 Fuin sōzu Eiwa jii (附音挿図英和字彙), compiled by Shibata Shōkichi and Koyasu Takashi, adopted many more Chinese-character translation terms and consulted Lobscheid's dictionary.

After the Qing court established the Tongwenguan in 1862, Chinese translations of Western works published in China included Elements of International Law (萬國公法, translated by W. A. P. Martin), Introduction to the Sciences (格物入門), Treatise on Plane and Spherical Trigonometry (三角數理), Principles of Chemistry (化學鑑原), and Elements of Geology (地學淺釋). Yanagiwara Sakimitsu, then an official of the Japanese Ministry of Foreign Affairs, purchased a dozen Chinese books, most of them published by the Jiangnan Arsenal, and Chinese translations of Western works served as references in Japan when translating textbooks and works in related disciplines. Among the Western works translated by the Jiangnan Arsenal in the second half of the 19th century was Elements of Geology (地學淺釋, Dìxué Qiǎnshì), which was transmitted to Japan and published in a Japanese woodblock edition in 1881.

Translators working directly from European and American texts could also consult Chinese translations of Western books. The second part of the missionary William Muirhead's compiled work Dili Quanzhi (地理全志) included a section titled "Dìzhìlùn" (地質論, 'geology'), and Mariko Takegami cites earlier scholarship suggesting that Mitsukuri Genpo's choice of 地質学 (chishitsugaku lit. 'earth-substance study') when translating Dutch geological texts may have been inspired by Dili Quanzhi. By contrast, Elements of Geology, translated from the 1865 sixth edition of Charles Lyell's Elements of Geology by Hua Hengfang and Daniel Jerome Macgowan, rendered geology as 地學 (dìxué lit. 'earth study'), while either retaining existing Chinese names for other technical terms or rendering them through semantic translation or phonetic transcription. Takegami points out that 地學 (Japanese 地学, chigaku) could also refer to the broader field of earth sciences, and debates took place in Meiji-era Japan over the two translation choices 地学 (chigaku) and 地質学 (chishitsugaku). Contemporary Chinese commentators praised the book's substance while criticizing its prose and terminology as difficult to understand; later, with the rise of new-style education in late-Qing China, schools such as the Nanjing School of Mining and Railways adopted it as a textbook, and it was repeatedly reprinted in Chinese collectanea. In the 1881 Japanese kundoku-annotated (Japanese-syntax reading of Classical Chinese) woodblock edition, some phonetic transcriptions were accompanied by katakana readings and the original English spellings, leading Takegami to infer that the annotator likely consulted the English original directly. Because early foreign instructors at the Faculty of Science of the University of Tokyo and the Imperial College of Engineering taught from original European and American textbooks, Elements of Geology was not adopted as a classroom textbook at either institution, though their libraries acquired it as a reference work, and its Japanese edition was listed in Kang Youwei's Bibliography of Japanese Books (日本書目志). Overall, subsequent Japanese translation of Western learning shifted primarily toward direct translation from European and American texts.

Among the Chinese–English and English–Chinese dictionaries published in the 19th century, Feng Tianyu lists selected translation terms in the five works shown below. He notes that the dictionaries by Walter Henry Medhurst, Wilhelm Lobscheid, and Justus Doolittle were drawn upon by English–Japanese and Japanese–English dictionaries from the Bakumatsu through the Meiji era.

Selected 19th-century Chinese–foreign dictionary translations listed by Feng Tianyu
| Dictionary and year | Selected Chinese-character translation terms listed by Feng |
|---|---|
| Robert Morrison, A Dictionary of the Chinese Language (華英字典), Part III (English–Chinese, 1822) | 使徒 ('apostle'), 鉛筆 ('pencil'), 交換 ('exchange'), 審判 ('judgment'), 法律 ('law'), 水準 ('level'), 醫學 ('medicine'), 自然的 ('natural'), 新聞 ('news'), 小說書 ('novel'), 風琴 ('organ'), 精神 ('spirit'), 單位 ('unit') |
| Samuel Wells Williams, An English and Chinese Vocabulary in the Court Dialect (英華韻府歷階, 1844) | 文法 ('grammar'), 新聞紙 ('newspaper'), 金剛石 ('diamond'), 內閣 ('cabinet'), 領事 ('consul'), 碼 ('yard') |
| Walter Henry Medhurst, English and Chinese Dictionary (英華字典, 1847–1848) | 直徑 ('diameter'), 本質 ('essence'), 知識 ('knowledge'), 機器 ('machine'), 幹事 ('secretary, manager'), 物質 ('matter'), 平面 ('plane'), 白金 ('platinum'), 偶然 ('accidental, chance'), 教養 ('cultivation, education'), 交際 ('intercourse, socializing'), 天主 ('God'), 默示 ('revelation'), 同情 ('sympathy') |
| Wilhelm Lobscheid, English and Chinese Dictionary (英華字典, 1866–1869) | 蛋白質 ('protein, albumen'), 銀行 ('bank'), 想像 ('imagination'), 保險 ('insurance'), 自由 ('liberty, freedom'), 文學 ('literature'), 元帥 ('marshal'), 原理 ('principle'), 右翼 ('right wing'), 法則 ('law, rule') |
| Justus Doolittle, Vocabulary and Hand-Book of the Chinese Language (英華萃林韻府, 1872) | 電報 ('telegraph'), 電池 ('battery'), 光線 ('ray of light'), 分子 ('molecule'), 地質論 ('geology'), 物理 ('physics'), 光學 ('optics'), 動力 ('motive power'), 國會 ('parliament, congress'), 函數 ('function'), 微分學 ('differential calculus') |

==== Specialized dictionaries ====
Pages 6 and 7 of the first edition of the Tetsugaku jii (1881), aligning English headwords with their kanji translations.

In the humanities and social sciences, early Meiji translation terms went through experimentation and dictionary compilation, with multiple candidate terms often coexisting alongside classical Chinese words given modern senses. For philosophy, competing translations included 理学 (rigaku lit. 'study of principles'), 窮理学 (kyūrigaku lit. 'study of exhausting principles'), 希賢学 (kikengaku lit. 'study of seeking worthiness'), and 希哲学 (kitetsugaku lit. 'study of seeking wisdom'), before 哲学 (tetsugaku lit. 'study of wisdom') prevailed; Nishi Amane initially used 哲学 to designate Western philosophy as distinct from traditional Confucianism. Zhu Jingwei argues that Nishi's translations laid the initial foundation for modern Japanese philosophical terminology, and that the first edition of the Tetsugaku jii (哲學字彙, Dictionary of Philosophy), compiled in 1881 by Inoue Tetsujirō and others, both inherited his terms and proposed many new translations while also covering terms from physics, law, and other disciplines alongside philosophy and logic. Zhu regards the years from 1881 to 1902 as a period of prolific coinage in philosophical terminology, and infers that the appearance of multiple specialized philosophical dictionaries after 1905 indicates that the terminological system had largely taken shape.

Among the 119 two-character Sino-Japanese compounds recorded under the letter E in the first edition of the Tetsugaku jii, 40 matched translation words in the earlier first edition of the Fuin sōzu Eiwa jii (附音挿図英和字彙, 'An English and Japanese Dictionary, Explanatory, Pronouncing, and Etymological') from 1873, whereas 114 matched those in the subsequent Zōho teisei Eiwa jii (增補訂正英和字彙, 'Revised and Enlarged English and Japanese Dictionary') of 1882. Based on this pattern of added translations, Park Kyun-cheol argues that the latter dictionary was influenced by the Tetsugaku jii; for example, under Enunciation, the 1882 revision retained the first edition's 布告 (fukoku 'proclamation') while adding 演述 (enjutsu lit. 'expounding and stating') and 講説 (kōsetsu lit. 'lecturing and explaining') from the Tetsugaku jii.

Translation terms also continued to be adjusted or replaced after entering dictionaries. For example, 適種生存 (tekishu seizon lit. 'survival of the fit species') in the first edition of the Tetsugaku jii appeared as 適者生存 (tekisha seizon 'survival of the fittest', lit. 'survival of the fit one') in the 1912 Dōbunkan Tetsugaku daijisho (哲學大辭書). The Tetsugaku jii itself revised entries across editions: its first and second editions rendered Aesthetics as 美妙学 (bimyōgaku lit. 'study of beauty and subtlety'), whereas the 1912 third edition adopted 美学 (bigaku lit. 'study of beauty') with an original note stating "formerly called 審美学 [shinbigaku lit. 'study of discerning beauty'], which is wrong", leading Zhu Jingwei to infer that 審美学 had been more widespread in society than 美妙学. Even before the third edition of the Tetsugaku jii, 美学 had already appeared in the title of Nakae Chōmin's earlier translation Ishi bigaku (維氏美學).

Page 3 (right) of the 1881 first edition of Tetsugaku jii, translating Aesthetics as 美妙学.

Page 5 (right) of the 1912 third edition of Tetsugaku jii, listing 美学 under Æsthetics.

==== Use in newspapers and magazines ====
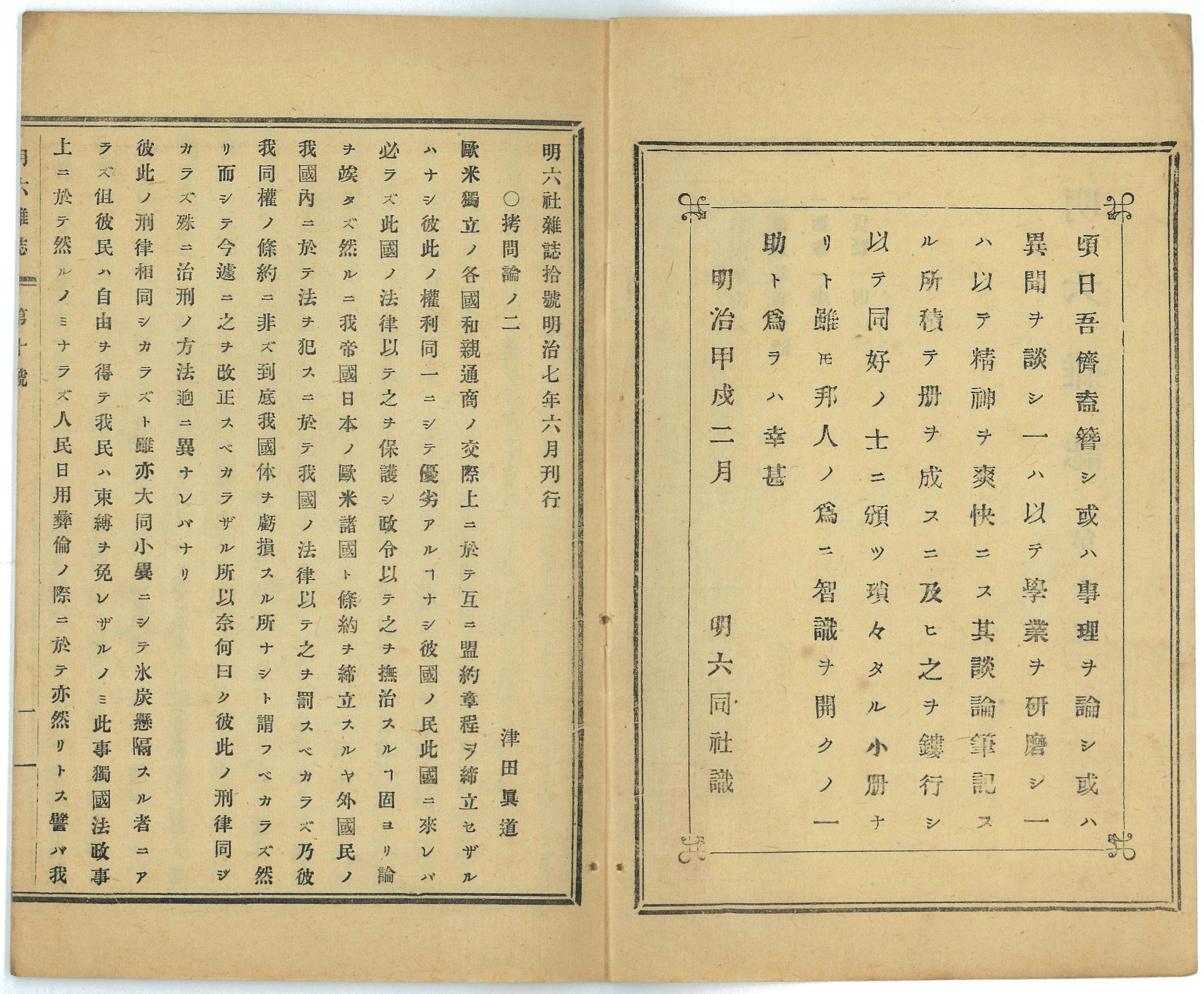
Inside pages of Meiroku Zasshi No. 10 (1874), with an essay by Tsuda Mamichi on the left and the founding statement on the right.

The Sino-Japanese terms compiled in the 1881 Tetsugaku jii (哲學字彙, 'Dictionary of Philosophy') encompassed pre-existing Chinese words, scholarly terms already established during the Edo period, translation words formed during the Meiji period, and general vocabulary. Haruko Sanada examined the process by which academic terminology entered general usage by comparing a sample extracted from the first edition against earlier and later Meiji-era newspapers and magazines as well as modern vocabulary data. In her survey, the 1901 sample from the general-interest magazine Taiyō (太陽) included Tetsugaku jii terms that did not appear in the 1877–1878 Yūbin Hōchi Shinbun (郵便報知新聞) sample, such as 哲学 (tetsugaku 'philosophy'), 主観 (shukan 'subjectivity'), 客観 (kyakkan 'objectivity'), 科学 (kagaku 'science'), and 心理 (shinri 'psychology, mentality'). Between the two samples, the relative frequencies of words such as 問題 (mondai 'problem, question'), 社会 (shakai 'society'), and 世界 (sekai 'world') also rose. Combining this with dictionary evidence, Sanada inferred that these academic Sino-Japanese terms rapidly entered general usage during the early Meiji period, that this progression slowed around 1900, and that some of the terms subsequently became part of the basic vocabulary of modern Japanese and high-frequency modern media vocabulary.

Beyond academic terminology, some military terms later entered news reporting and general dictionaries, with 情報 (jōhō 'news, information') as one example. In Meiji-era military manuals, 情報 initially coexisted with 状報 (jōhō), and after around 1890 the use of 状報 declined markedly. During the First Sino-Japanese War, on 29 November 1894, the newspaper Nihon (日本) used 情報 (jōhō) when quoting a military order in a dispatch from a war correspondent. When the newspaper published a report from the Imperial General Headquarters the following day, it used the word again, whereas the Yorozu chōhō (萬朝報) and Jiji shinpō (時事新報), printing the same dispatch, replaced it with 諸報 (shohō 'various reports') and 報告 (hōkoku 'report'), respectively. Atsuo Ono notes that the word subsequently appeared primarily in reporting on wars, civil disturbances, and disasters, and that by the eve of the Russo-Japanese War in 1904 it was appearing frequently in newspapers as an established journalistic term. Beyond periodicals, 情報 (jōhō) was also recorded in general-purpose Japanese dictionaries. Works such as the 1904 Shinpen kango jirin (新編漢語辭林) and the 1907 Jirin (辭林) included 情報 (jōhō), defining it chiefly as news, notification, or a report of affairs. Ono points out that the scope of usage reflected in these dictionary definitions was broader than the earlier military terminology.

== Word formation ==
Japanese speakers used Chinese characters (kanji) to coin new words and derive new meanings through several mechanisms. First, words or phrases originally pronounced with native Japanese readings (kun'yomi) were shifted to Sino-Japanese character readings (on'yomi). Second, compounds were derived from kanji that had acquired Japan-specific meanings, or kanji were combined directly according to Japanese grammatical relations. Third, new forms were created by replacing characters with others that sound the same, and through abbreviation. In modern translations of Western learning, terms were systematically combined and derived on the basis of two-character word bases.

=== Converting kun readings to on readings ===
Some native Japanese words (wago) originally read with kun'yomi retained their kanji spellings while shifting to on'yomi, taking on the outward appearance of Sino-Japanese vocabulary while remaining native in substance. For example, 返り事 (historical kana かへりごと, modern reading kaerigoto, 'reply') was written as 返事 and read as henji (ヘンジ), and 物騒がし (ものさわがし, monosawagashi, 'noisy; unsettled') was written as 物騒 and read as bussō (ブッソウ, 'unsettled; dangerous'). Beyond shifting the reading of an entire word, another method extracted characters from the kanji assigned to native Japanese verbs or phrases and combined them into compounds, as in 推量 (suiryō, 'conjecture') from 推し量る (oshihakaru, 'to guess'), and 免許 (menkyo, 'license; permission') from 許しを免ずる (yurushi o menzuru, 'to grant pardon'). In addition, a clausal structure could be condensed into a single word, such as the on'yomi term 理不尽 (rifujin, リフジン, 'unreasonable') from 理尽くさず (ri tsukusazu, 'reason not exhausted').

As Japanese absorbed kanji meanings through kanbun kundoku (the traditional practice of reading and glossing Classical Chinese texts in Japanese), a single native kun reading gradually came to correspond to multiple kanji. This lack of one-to-one correspondence between kun readings and kanji meanings formed part of the background to wasei-kango. Chen Liwei compares on'yomi to a "glue": reading longer, loosely structured kun'yomi phrases consecutively with on'yomi helped bind the characters closely together and condense them into a single word. For example, converting the phrase 心を配る (kokoro o kubaru, 'to pay attention; to worry') into the on'yomi word 心配 (shinpai, 'worry; anxiety') allowed it to function directly as a noun, simplifying its grammatical use in a sentence. Reviewing this research, Masaru Tajima also notes that once condensed into a single word, a term more readily undergoes semantic change.

=== Japanization of kanji meanings ===
Some kanji developed meanings in Japanese that did not exist in Chinese and were used to form new compounds, such as 済 in 返済 (hensai, 'repayment') and 配 in 高配 (kōhai, 'kind consideration'). Chen Liwei refers to such kanji with Japanized meanings that serve as the core for deriving series of compounds as "axis characters" (軸字), including 淋, 済, 仮, and 配.

=== Japanese grammatical structure ===
When wago expressions converted to on'yomi were combined as kanji compounds, their word order followed two different tendencies. One followed Classical Chinese syntax, reversing subject-first 腹が立つ (hara ga tatsu, 'to get angry', lit. 'the belly rises/stands') into predicate-first 立腹 (rippuku, 'anger'), or object-verb 札を改める (fuda o aratameru, 'to check tickets') into verb-object 改札 (kaisatsu, 'ticket inspection'). The other preserved native Japanese order, with the object or complement before the verb, as in 心配 (shinpai) and 酒乱 (shuran, 'disorderly drunkenness', from 酒に乱れる, sake ni midareru).

Chen Liwei also classifies 直行 (chokkō, 'going direct'), 楽勝 (rakushō, 'easy victory'), and 酒造 (shuzō, 'sake brewing') as words formed according to wago word-formation patterns. In analyzing adverbial modification of a verb, Chen notes on the basis of a comparative survey of vocabulary in the Analects in Chinese and Japanese that adverbs in Classical Chinese were mostly function words, so adverb-verb modification was generally understood as a sentence-level unit and rarely condensed directly into a single word. Japanese, by contrast, influenced by kun'yomi glossing, tended to interpret and form such adverb-verb combinations as compounds at the word level.

In addition, some graphic lookalikes whose written forms appear in Chinese classics acquired a different meaning in Japanese because their internal grammatical structures differed in the two languages. Chen argues that words whose Sino-Japanese semantic divergence stems from differences in internal word-formation structure can also be regarded as wasei-kango. For example, although 洋行 appears in Chinese texts as a modifier-noun construction meaning 'Westerner's firm', Japanese analyzed it as a verb-complement construction (西洋へ行く, seiyō e iku, 'to go to the West') meaning 'traveling to the West'. Other examples that acquired distinctively Japanese meanings through differing internal structural relations include 激動 (gekidō, 'upheaval; agitation') and 安置 (anchi, 'enshrinement; laying in state').

=== Modification of word forms ===
As on'yomi vocabulary increased in Japanese, kanji spellings were often altered using homophonous characters, producing new forms detached from the original Chinese orthography. Examples of homophonic respelling include rewriting the original Chinese 料簡 as 了見 or 量見 (ryōken, 'intention; judgment'), and 穿鑿 as 詮索 (sensaku, 'prying; inquiry').

After World War II, Japanese script policies limiting the number of kanji prompted large-scale homophonic respelling. Chen Liwei divides postwar respellings of traditional Chinese-character forms into two types: cases where the revised Japanese spelling also exists in Chinese, such as 意嚮 to 意向 (ikō, 'intention') and 陰翳 to 陰影 (in'ei, 'shadow; shade'); and cases where the respelling created a distinctively Japanese word form, such as 銓衡 to 選考 (senkō, 'selection; screening') and 繃帯 to 包帯 (hōtai, 'bandage'). Homophonic respelling was also sometimes accompanied by semantic change.

Alongside homophonic respelling, abbreviation is another way Japanese formed Sino-Japanese word forms, as in 発禁 (hakkin, 'ban on publication'), 節電 (setsuden, 'electricity saving'), and 民放 (minpō, 'commercial broadcasting').

=== Formation of modern translated terms ===
Using materials such as the Yakken (訳鍵, 'Key to Translation') and the Tetsugaku jii (哲学字彙, 'Dictionary of Philosophy'), Shigeo Takano studied the word-formation methods of wasei-kango from the early modern period to the early Meiji period. Taking the word base (語基, goki, a constituent used in building a word) as his unit of analysis, he analyzed the structure of compound and derived words as well as productive single-character word-forming elements.

Takano classified the translation methods used when early modern and modern Japan absorbed Western concepts into four categories: substitution with existing words, borrowing or repurposing, phonetic transcription, and neologism. In a book review, Haruko Sanada noted that these methods often overlap. For example, she explained 幾何 (kika 'geometry') as having first been coined in China as a phonetic transcription of geo(metry), and then borrowed into Japan and read with its Japanese pronunciation, thus combining the properties of phonetic transcription and borrowing.

All of the Japanese-coined word bases that Takano extracted from the first edition of the Tetsugaku jii consisted of two kanji; he found no newly coined single-character word bases that could stand alone as independent words. Takano argues that the coining of translated terms at the time first established two-character word bases (whether borrowed or newly coined) corresponding to foreign concepts, and then combined these bases into three- and four-character words. For example, the first edition of the Tetsugaku jii combined the newly coined two-character base 科学 (kagaku, 'science') with the classical Chinese base 修練 (shūren, 'training; discipline') to form the four-character compound 科学修練 (kagaku shūren, translating "scientific culture"), while the third edition included various forms using 科学 as an initial or final base, such as 自然科学 (shizen kagaku, 'natural science') and 科学者 (kagakusha, 'scientist').

For free-standing two-character Japanese-coined word bases capable of functioning as independent words, Takano identified three formation pathways on the basis of the Tetsugaku jii and Meiji-period sources:

Formation pathways of two-character word bases identified by Shigeo Takano
| Pathway | Word-formation mechanism | Representative examples and analysis |
|---|---|---|
| Direct formation of a two-character base | Directly formed as a two-character word that can be used independently. | Early independent two-character words listed by Takano include 逆説 (gyakusetsu, 'paradox'). |
| Three-character word followed by affix loss | First formed as a three-character word with a prefix or suffix; the affix was later dropped, leaving the two-character portion as an independent word base. | 慣用法 (kan'yōhō, translating "common law"; Takano notes this three-character word appeared earlier, with 慣用, kan'yō, only later used independently) 共産論 (kyōsanron, translating "communism"; Takano records that it was later retranslated as 共産主義, kyōsanshugi, and 共産, kyōsan, did not appear independently until the 1900s) |
| Four-character word followed by separation of a two-character word | First formed as a four-character compound; later the front or rear two-character base separated out to function independently. | 主我発動 (shuga hatsudō, translating "self-regarding act"; front two characters separated: the four-character word appears in the first edition, and Takano infers 主我, shuga, became independent later) 世界現状 (sekai genjō, translating "cosmography"; rear two characters separated: the four-character combination appears in the first edition, and Takano infers 現状, genjō, began to be used independently in the Meiji 20s [1887–1896]) |

=== Productive series ===
In modern Chinese-character vocabulary, a single word-forming element could also be used repeatedly to create a series of related Chinese-character terms. For example, 海水浴 (kaisuiyoku 'sea bathing') and 蒸気浴 (jōkiyoku 'steam bath') in Rangaku (Dutch studies) texts both attach 浴 (-yoku 'bath; bathing') to the end of a two-character stem (海水, kaisui 'seawater'; and 蒸気, jōki 'steam'). Both words are also found in modern Chinese (海水浴, hǎishuǐyù; 蒸氣浴, zhēngqìyù). This "2+1" three-character pattern, combining a two-character word base with a single-character base or suffix, was an active mode of word formation from the Rangaku period through the Meiji era.

Examining three-character words across 7 Japanese Rangaku works (1798–1857) and 13 Chinese works on Western learning by missionaries in China (1853–1896), Zhu Jingwei observes the "2+1" three-character word-formation pattern combining a two-character stem with a single-character suffixal element in the Chinese texts as well, and argues that Rangaku texts drew on Chinese word-formation patterns generally while expanding the productivity of the final single-character element, enabling it to combine with a wider variety of two-character stems. In Zhu's sample, the Chinese missionary texts used 216 distinct final single-character bases, averaging about 3.86 different three-character words per base, whereas the Japanese Rangaku texts used 103 distinct final bases, averaging about 7 different three-character words per base. Thus, the Chinese corpus used a wider variety of final bases with fewer coinages each, while the Rangaku texts used a smaller set of final bases to generate more three-character words on average. However, certain suffixal elements attested only in Japanese materials are concentrated in just one or two works; Zhu therefore argues that their use remained heavily shaped by individual authors and their specialized fields and cannot yet be considered firmly established in the Rangaku period, noting that the full development of creating groups of three-character words from the same final base occurred mainly from the Meiji period onward. In addition, deriving new words with suffixes such as -化 (-ka, '-ize; -ification'), -性 (-sei, '-ity; -ness'), -式 (-shiki, '-style; -type'), and -的 (-teki, '-ic; -al') was another way wasei-kango expanded its vocabulary.

=== Examples of word formation ===
Following Chen Liwei's classification, the two tables below first distinguish between "new word forms created in Japan" and "words derived from existing Chinese forms", and then arrange example words by their method of formation. Under "new combinations or orthographic forms created in Japanese", examples are further subdivided into the Japanization of kanji, homophonic respelling, abbreviation, native-Japanese-style (wago-style) compounding, and affixation. In the first table, the "Formation process" column for "words formed from native Japanese expressions" lists the kanji, modern kana, and romanization of the original expressions, retaining historical kana spellings from source texts in square brackets where pronunciation changes are illustrated. A dash ("–") in the final column indicates that no borrowed Chinese form is listed for that entry in the cited classification.

New word forms created in Japan
| Subtype | Japanese term and reading | Meaning | Formation process | Borrowed form in Chinese |
(1) Words formed from native Japanese (wago) expressions
| | 大根 (daikon) | Daikon radish ('white radish') | 大根 (おおね [historical kana: おほね], ōne 'large root; daikon radish') → 大根 (read with Sino-Japanese on'yomi pronunciations as daikon) | – |
| | 返事 (henji) | Reply, answer, or return letter | 返り事 (かえりごと [historical kana: かへりごと], kaerigoto 'reply', from 返り 'returning' + 事 'matter') → 返事 (henji) | – |
| | 心配 (shinpai) | Worry, anxiety, or concern | 心を配る (こころをくばる, kokoro o kubaru 'to pay attention; to distribute one's mind/heart', from 心 'heart/mind' + 配る 'to distribute') → 心配 (shinpai) | – |
| | 立腹 (rippuku) | To get angry or take offense | 腹が立つ (はらがたつ, hara ga tatsu 'to get angry', lit. 'the belly rises/stands', from 腹 'belly' + 立つ 'to stand/rise') → 立腹 (rippuku) | – |
| | 改札 (kaisatsu) | Ticket inspection, or a ticket gate | 札を改める (ふだをあらためる, fuda o aratameru 'to inspect tickets', from 札 'ticket/tag' + 改める 'to examine/inspect') → 改札 (kaisatsu) | – |
| | 挙式 (kyoshiki) | Holding a ceremony, especially a wedding | 式を挙げる (しきをあげる, shiki o ageru 'to hold a ceremony', from 式 'ceremony' + 挙げる 'to raise/hold') → 挙式 (kyoshiki) | – |
| | 引率 (insotsu) | Leading or guiding a group of people | 率いる (ひきいる [historical kana: ひきゐる], hikiiru 'to lead') → 引率 (insotsu, combining 引 'to pull/lead' and 率 'to lead/command') | – |
| | 推量 (suiryō) | Conjecture, inference, or surmise | 推し量る (おしはかる, oshihakaru 'to conjecture; to surmise', from 推し 'inferring' + 量る 'to measure/weigh') → 推量 (suiryō) | 推量 (tuīliáng 'conjecture') |
| | 出張 (shutchō) | Business trip or official trip | 出張る (でばる, debaru 'to project; to go out to a place') → 出張 (shutchō) | – |
(2) New combinations or orthographic forms created in Japanese
| 1. Japanization of kanji Forming compounds using characters coined in Japan (kokuji) or senses developed by characters within Japanese. | 甲状腺 (kōjōsen) | Thyroid gland | Uses the Japanese-coined character 腺 (sen 'gland'), combining the flesh radical with 泉 (sen 'spring') to denote a fluid-secreting organ. | 甲狀腺 / 甲状腺 (jiǎzhuàngxiàn 'thyroid gland') |
| 1. Japanization of kanji Forming compounds using characters coined in Japan (kokuji) or senses developed by characters within Japanese. | 労働 (rōdō) | Labor, work | Uses the Japanese-coined character 働 (dō 'work'), combining the person radical with 動 (dō 'movement'). | 勞動 / 劳动 (láodòng 'labor', in its modern sense) |
| 1. Japanization of kanji Forming compounds using characters coined in Japan (kokuji) or senses developed by characters within Japanese. | 画鋲 (gabyō) | Thumbtack, drawing pin | Uses the Japanese-coined character 鋲 (byō 'tack/rivet'), denoting a nail with a large round head; Kanjipedia cites 画鋲 (combining 画 'picture/drawing' + 鋲 'tack') as an example. | – |
| 1. Japanization of kanji Forming compounds using characters coined in Japan (kokuji) or senses developed by characters within Japanese. | 返済 (hensai) | Repayment of a debt or return of an item | The key character is 済 (sai), associated with the native Japanese (kun'yomi) verb 済む (sumu 'to end; to be settled'), alongside 返 ('to return'). Introducing Chen Liwei's research, Masaru Tajima cites 済 as an example of a character participating in word formation after acquiring a specifically Japanese sense. | – |
| 1. Japanization of kanji Forming compounds using characters coined in Japan (kokuji) or senses developed by characters within Japanese. | 稼動 (kadō) | Work, or the operation of machinery | 稼 (ka) originally meant 'to plant grain' or 'harvest' in Chinese, but in Japanese it came to write 稼ぐ (kasegu 'to work for a living; to earn'), extending its meaning beyond agriculture. 稼動 combines this 'work' sense with 動 ('to move/operate'). | – |
| 1. Japanization of kanji Forming compounds using characters coined in Japan (kokuji) or senses developed by characters within Japanese. | 介錯 (kaishaku) | Acting as a second (kaishakunin) to decapitate someone performing seppuku | Here 介 (kai) means 'to assist' or 'to attend upon'. Early uses of 介錯 meant 'attending to and caring for someone', and it was later applied to beheading a person committing seppuku. | – |
| 1. Japanization of kanji Forming compounds using characters coined in Japan (kokuji) or senses developed by characters within Japanese. | 若輩 (jakuhai) | Young person, or an inexperienced person | In Japan, 若 (jaku) acquired the sense of 若い (wakai 'young'), and the word 弱輩 ('weak/inexperienced fellows', with 輩 meaning 'fellows/generation') also came to be respelled as 若輩 to refer to young or inexperienced people. | – |
| 2. Homophonic respelling in Japanese; Replacing older spellings with other kanji that have the same reading in Japanese. | 要請 (yōsei) | Request, demand, or call for | 邀請 → 要請 (both read yōsei) | – |
| 2. Homophonic respelling in Japanese; Replacing older spellings with other kanji that have the same reading in Japanese. | 年配 (nenpai) | Age, or being advanced in years | 年輩 → 年配 (both read nenpai) | – |
| 2. Homophonic respelling in Japanese; Replacing older spellings with other kanji that have the same reading in Japanese. | 選考 (senkō) | Selection, screening | 詮衡 → 選考 (both read senkō) | – |
| 2. Homophonic respelling in Japanese; Replacing older spellings with other kanji that have the same reading in Japanese. | 丁重 (teichō) | Courteous, polite, respectful | 鄭重 → 丁重 (both read teichō) | – |
| 2. Homophonic respelling in Japanese; Replacing older spellings with other kanji that have the same reading in Japanese. | 技量 (giryō) | Skill, ability, competence | 技倆 → 技量 (both read giryō) | – |
| 2. Homophonic respelling in Japanese; Replacing older spellings with other kanji that have the same reading in Japanese. | 丁寧 (teinei) | Polite, courteous, or careful and thorough | 叮嚀 → 丁寧 (both read teinei) | – |
| 2. Homophonic respelling in Japanese; Replacing older spellings with other kanji that have the same reading in Japanese. | 了見 (ryōken) | Idea, thought, intention, or judgment | 料簡 → 了見 / 量見 (all read ryōken). | – |
| 2. Homophonic respelling in Japanese; Replacing older spellings with other kanji that have the same reading in Japanese. | 詮索 (sensaku) | Inquiry, investigation, or prying | 穿鑿 → 詮索 (both read sensaku). | – |
| 3. Abbreviation | 発禁 (hakkin) | Ban on publication or sale | Contracted from 発売禁止 (hatsubai kinshi 'prohibition of sale') by taking the first character of 発売 (hatsubai 'sale/publication') and 禁止 (kinshi 'prohibition'). | – |
| 3. Abbreviation | 時効 (jikō) | Age hardening (in materials science), the hardening of a supersaturated solid-solution alloy over time | Shortened from 時効硬化 (jikō kōka 'age hardening') by omitting 硬化 (kōka 'hardening'). | – |
| 3. Abbreviation | 重文 (jūbun) | Abbreviation for Important Cultural Property | Contracted from 重要文化財 (jūyō bunkazai 'Important Cultural Property') by taking the first character of 重要 (jūyō 'important') and 文化財 (bunkazai 'cultural property'). | – |
| 3. Abbreviation | 民放 (minpō) | Commercial (private) radio or television broadcasting | Contracted from 民間放送 (minkan hōsō 'commercial/private broadcasting') by taking the first character of 民間 (minkan 'private/non-governmental') and 放送 (hōsō 'broadcasting'). | – |
| 4. Native-Japanese-style (wago-style) compounding | 直行 (chokkō) | Going directly without stopping | Corresponds in meaning to まっすぐに行く (massugu ni iku 'to go straight'), where the first element 直 ('straight/direct') specifies the manner of the verb 行 ('to go'). | – |
| 4. Native-Japanese-style (wago-style) compounding | 楽勝 (rakushō) | Winning easily, an easy victory | Corresponds in meaning to 楽に勝つ (raku ni katsu 'to win easily'), where 楽 ('easy/comfortable') specifies the manner of 勝 ('to win'). | – |
| 4. Native-Japanese-style (wago-style) compounding | 酒造 (shuzō) | Sake brewing, alcohol production | Built with Japanese object–verb word order: the first constituent 酒 ('sake/alcohol') is the object of the second constituent 造 ('to make/brew'). Corresponds in meaning to 酒を造る (sake o tsukuru 'to brew sake'). | – |
| 4. Native-Japanese-style (wago-style) compounding | 便乗 (binjō) | Getting a ride in someone else's vehicle, or taking advantage of an opportunity | Classified in Japanese Linguistics and Japanese Language Education (日語語言學與日語教育) under compounds incorporating a Japanese で (de, instrumental/locative) or に (ni, dative/locative) case relation. | – |
| 5. Affixation; Adding an affix after a base word to form a derivative. | 機械化 (kikaika) | Mechanization (replacing human labor with machinery) | 機械 (kikai 'machine') + suffix ～化 (-ka '-ization'), indicating transformation into a state. | – |
| 5. Affixation; Adding an affix after a base word to form a derivative. | 可能性 (kanōsei) | Possibility | 可能 (kanō 'possible') + suffix ～性 (-sei '-ity / nature'). | – |
| 5. Affixation; Adding an affix after a base word to form a derivative. | 日本式 (nihonshiki) | Japanese style or method | 日本 (Nihon 'Japan') + suffix ～式 (-shiki 'style/type'), indicating a manner or style. | – |
| 5. Affixation; Adding an affix after a base word to form a derivative. | 科学的 (kagakuteki) | Scientific, related to science | 科学 (kagaku 'science') + suffix ～的 (-teki '-ic / -ical'), indicating a related domain or property. Zhu Jingwei surmises that Chinese 的 (de) entered Japanese in the late Edo period (first half of the 19th century), primarily through Vernacular Chinese materials from the Song and Yuan dynasties onward such as Zen Buddhist texts, Neo-Confucian writings, and huaben fiction. From the early Meiji period it was further used in English–Japanese translation, gradually developing into a Japanese suffix. | – |
(3) Modern newly coined translation words
| | 哲学 (tetsugaku) | Philosophy | Coined to translate English philosophy (combining 哲 'wise/sage' + 学 'study/learning'). | 哲學 / 哲学 (zhéxué 'philosophy') |
| | 美学 (bigaku) | Aesthetics | Coined to translate English aesthetics and German Ästhetik (combining 美 'beauty' + 学 'study'). | 美學 / 美学 (měixué 'aesthetics') |
| | 喜劇 (kigeki) | Comedy | Coined to translate English comedy (combining 喜 'joy/delight' + 劇 'drama/play'). | 喜劇 / 喜剧 (xǐjù 'comedy') |
| | 抽象 (chūshō) | Abstract | Coined to translate English abstract (combining 抽 'to draw out' + 象 'image/form'). | 抽象 (chōuxiàng 'abstract') |
| | 神経 (shinkei) | Nerve | Formed by combining 神 ('spirit/vital energy') from 神気 (shinki 'vital spirit') and 経 ('meridian/vessel') from 経脈 (keimyaku 'meridian channels') to translate the Dutch term for 'nerve' (zenuw). | 神經 / 神经 (shénjīng 'nerve') |
| | 国際 (kokusai) | International (between nations) | Coined from the phrase 各国交際 (kakkoku kōsai 'intercourse among nations', combining 国 'country' + 際 'intercourse/border'), and later used to translate English international. | 國際 / 国际 (guójì 'international') |
| | 美術 (bijutsu) | Fine art (visual/plastic arts such as painting and sculpture) | Calqued from Western art terms such as English fine arts (combining 美 'fine/beautiful' + 術 'art/technique'). | 美術 / 美术 (měishù 'fine art') |
| | 定義 (teigi) | Definition (clearly delimiting the meaning of a concept or word) | Coined to translate English definition (combining 定 'to fix/determine' + 義 'meaning'). | 定義 / 定义 (dìngyì 'definition') |

Forms derived from pre-existing Chinese word forms
| Subtype | Japanese example and reading | Meaning in Japanese | Formation process | Corresponding form borrowed into Chinese |
(1) Preexisting word forms with differing Japanese and Chinese morphological structures
| | 激動 (gekidō) | 'violent shaking' or 'turbulence; upheaval' | Japanese uses 激 ('violently; intensely') to modify 動 ('to move'), forming a combination of an adverbial component and a verbal component. In Chinese, 激動 (jīdòng) can mean 'to rouse; to stir', 'to move (emotionally)', or 'emotionally agitated'. | – |
| | 安置 (anchi) | 'to enshrine; to lay in state' (often referring to a Buddhist image or a body) | In Chinese, 安置 (ānzhì) was originally a coordinate combination of the two verbs 安 ('to settle') and 置 ('to place'). Japanese reinterpreted 安 via the adverbial reading 安らかに (yasuraka ni 'peacefully; securely'), turning the word into a modifier–verb (ren'yō) structure modifying 置 ('to place'). | – |
| | 洋行 (yōkō) | 'travel to Western countries' | Japanese uses 洋 ('the West; Western ocean') to indicate the destination of 行 ('to go; travel'), meaning 'going to the West'. Modern Chinese, by contrast, uses 洋 ('foreign; Western') to modify 行 (háng 'commercial firm') in 洋行 (yángháng), meaning 'foreign trading firm'. | – |
(2) Preexisting Classical Chinese word forms that acquired modern senses
| | 社会 (shakai) | 'society' | Classically referred to festive gatherings held to honor tutelary deities; in the modern era, used as a translation equivalent for English society. | 社會 (shèhuì 'society') |
| | 経済 (keizai) | 'economy' | Classically referred to governing the world and relieving the people (經世濟民, jīngshì jìmín) or administering the state; in the modern era, used as a translation equivalent for English economy. | 經濟 (jīngjì 'economy') |
| | 文化 (bunka) | 'culture' | Classically referred to civil governance and moral transformation (文治教化, wénzhì jiàohuà); in the modern era, used as a translation equivalent for English culture. | 文化 (wénhuà 'culture') |
| | 共和 (kyōwa) | 'republic; republicanism; republican system of government' | The classical wordform appears in the Records of the Grand Historian (史記, Shǐjì); in the modern era it was used to translate Western forms of government and later became fixed as the translation equivalent for English republic. | 共和 (gònghé 'republic; republican') |
| | 民主 (minshu) | 'democracy' | Classically meant 'lord of the people' (民之主, mín zhī zhǔ, i.e. the ruler of the people). The Chinese translation of Elements of International Law (萬國公法, Wànguó Gōngfǎ, 1864) already used 民主之國 (mínzhǔ zhī guó) to refer to Western republican polities, primarily corresponding to English republic, and this usage was subsequently transmitted to Japan. Nishi Amane used the term in his Hyakugaku renkan (百學連環, 1870) in the phrase 民主之治 (minshu no chi 'democratic governance') to translate English democracy, which he explained as joint rule by the multitude. Japan later settled on 共和 (kyōwa) to translate republic and used terms such as 民主主義 (minshushugi) to correspond to democracy; in the early 20th century, Chinese borrowed 民主主義 from Japanese, and the modern senses of 民主 (as 'the people as masters', 民作主, mín zuòzhǔ) and 共和 gradually diverged and stabilized. | Chinese originally had the classical word form 民主 (mínzhǔ 'lord of the people'), which later acquired the modern sense 'democracy' through two-way Sino-Japanese exchange; Chinese also borrowed 民主主義 (mínzhǔ zhǔyì 'democracy; democratic ideology') from Japanese 民主主義 (minshushugi) |
| | 革命 (kakumei) | 'revolution' | Classically referred to the transfer of the Mandate of Heaven and the replacement of a ruling dynasty; in the modern era, used as a translation equivalent for English revolution. | 革命 (gémìng 'revolution') |
| | 観念 (kannen) | 'idea; mental representation' | Originally a Buddhist term for contemplative observation and mindfulness; in the modern era, used as a translation equivalent for English idea. | 觀念 (guānniàn 'idea; concept') |
| | 文明 (bunmei) | 'civilization' | The wordform appears in the I Ching (易經, Yìjīng); in the Meiji period it was used as a translation equivalent for English civilization. | 文明 (wénmíng 'civilization') |
| | 宗教 (shūkyō) | 'religion' | Classically referred to Buddhism or the teachings of a Buddhist sect; in the modern era, used as a translation equivalent for English religion. | 宗教 (zōngjiào 'religion') |
| | 福祉 (fukushi) | 'social welfare' | Classically meant 'happiness; blessing'; in modern usage, specifically refers to the material and economic satisfaction of members of society under public care. | 福祉 (fúzhǐ 'welfare; well-being') |

== Distinguishing homophones in speech ==
Japanese contains many homophonous Sino-Japanese words; for example, 家庭 ('household'), 仮定 ('assumption'), 過程 ('process'), and 課程 ('curriculum') are all pronounced katei with their usual on'yomi readings. In Kanji and the Japanese (漢字と日本人, Kanji to Nihonjin), Toshio Takashima argues that Japanese speakers can usually distinguish such homophones by ear because they mentally associate the spoken words with their kanji.

In spoken communication, speakers also sometimes substitute special readings, often incorporating native Japanese kun'yomi readings, to disambiguate homophones directly. As noted by the Subdivision on the Japanese Language of the Council for Cultural Affairs, 市立 ('municipal') and 私立 ('private') both have the standard Sino-Japanese reading shiritsu, but in speech they may be read as ichiritsu and watakushiritsu, respectively. Similarly, 化学 ('chemistry') and 科学 ('science') share the standard reading kagaku, so 化学 may be read in spoken Japanese as bakegaku to avoid confusion.

== Lexical exchange in East Asia ==
=== Transmission into Chinese ===
During the Meiji period, Japanese scholars used Chinese-character morphemes to translate Western political, scientific, and social concepts, coining new word forms as well as assigning new specialized meanings to classical words. In the late 19th and early 20th centuries, the number of Chinese students studying in Japan increased. Between 1902 and 1904, works translated from Japanese into Chinese accounted for 62.2% of all Chinese translations published at the time. During this period, Chinese borrowed numerous kanji compounds coined in Japan to translate Western academic and abstract concepts, and these words later became an integral part of modern Chinese. For example, Yishu Huibian (譯書彙編, 'Collected Translations'), a periodical founded in 1900 by Chinese students in Japan, serialized Chinese translations of Japanese works in politics, economics, education, and related fields before reprinting them as standalone books, thereby introducing these newly coined Sino-Japanese terms into China through print. When Japanese-derived terms first entered Chinese, they sometimes coexisted with or were glossed alongside earlier Chinese translations of Western learning. In early essays in his Yinbingshi Heji (飲冰室合集, 'Collected Writings from the Ice-Drinker's Studio'), Liang Qichao used the Japanese term 科學 (Chinese: kēxué 'science') while adding the explanatory note that it referred to Chinese equivalents such as 格致學 (gézhìxué, a traditional term for natural studies); conversely, when using the Chinese rendering 群學 (qúnxué 'study of human grouping'), he added that in Japan it was called 社會學 (shakaigaku; Chinese: shèhuìxué, 'sociology').

Japanese translation terms absorbed into Chinese include 哲學 (tetsugaku 'philosophy'), 社會 (shakai 'society'), 音符 (onpu 'musical note'), 音域 (on'iki 'vocal or tonal range'), and 工業 (kōgyō 'industry'; Chinese: gōngyè). In musical terminology, 音符 (onpu, denoting a symbol used to notate musical tones) translates English note, while 音域 (on'iki, the pitch range from low to high) translates English range and compass.

The terms 民主 (mínzhǔ; Japanese: minshu) and 共和 (gònghé; Japanese: kyōwa) illustrate a more complex two-way semantic interaction between Chinese and Japanese. Both words appear in classical Chinese texts: in the Book of Documents (書經) and Zuo Zhuan (左傳), 民主 originally meant "lord of the people" (民之主, mín zhī zhǔ), referring to a ruler, while 共和 appears in the Records of the Grand Historian (史記) in reference to the Gonghe Regency of the Zhou dynasty. In the mid-19th century, Chinese and Japanese translators rendered Western political concepts independently: the 1864 Chinese translation of Elements of International Law (萬國公法, Wànguó Gōngfǎ) used 民主之國 (mínzhǔ zhī guó) primarily for republic, whereas the Japanese work Kon'yo Zushiki (坤輿圖識, 1845–1847) used 共和政治 (kyōwa seiji) for Western non-monarchical polities, and the 1862 Eiwa Taiyaku Shūchin Jisho (英和對譯袖珍辭書, 'Pocket Dictionary of the English and Japanese Languages') translated both republic and democracy as 共和政治.

In the second half of the 19th century, 民主之國 entered Japan through the Chinese Wanguo Gongfa and English-Chinese dictionaries, coexisting and overlapping with 共和政治 as a rendering of republic. Hyakugaku Renkan (百學連環, 1870), which recorded lectures by Nishi Amane, used 民主之治 (minshu no chi) to translate democracy, explaining it as governance by the multitude without a monarch; subsequently, 民主 appeared in compounds such as 民主政治 (minshu seiji 'democratic politics') and 民主主義 (minshushugi 'democracy; democratism'), expanding in meaning to institutional and ideological levels. At the end of the 19th century, Chinese students in Japan brought the modern Japanese sense of 共和 back into Chinese, where it temporarily coexisted with 民主. After 民主主義 (Chinese: mínzhǔ zhǔyì) entered Chinese in the early 20th century, the two terms underwent semantic differentiation in both languages, settling into a division of labor with 民主 rendering democracy and 共和 rendering republic.

Semantic evolution and transmission of 民主 and 共和
| Classical Chinese 民主 (mínzhǔ) "Lord of the people" (民之主), i.e., ruler of the people | Classical Chinese 共和 (gònghé); Gonghe period of the Zhou dynasty recorded in the Records of the Grand Historian |
| ↓ | ↓ |
| Early modern Chinese; Wanguo Gongfa (1864) uses 民主之國 (mínzhǔ zhī guó) primarily for republic | Early modern Japanese; Kon'yo Zushiki (1845–1847) uses 共和政治 (kyōwa seiji) for Western non-monarchical polities |
| 民主 enters Japan ↘ | ↙ |
民主 and 共和 coexist in Japanese; Both used for republic, with usage gradually diverging
| ↙ | ↘ |
| Simultaneously, Japanese uses 民主之治 (minshu no chi) and later 民主主義 (minshushugi) for democracy | Modern Japanese sense of 共和 brought back to Chinese by students in Japan in the late 19th century, temporarily coexisting with Chinese 民主 |
| ↓ |
| Early 20th century Chinese adopts Japanese 民主主義 (Chinese: mínzhǔ zhǔyì) | Semantic differentiation continues ↓ |
| ↘ | ↙ |
Semantic division of labor stabilizes in both Chinese and Japanese 民主 corresponds to democracy; 共和 corresponds to republic

Beyond borrowing whole words, Chinese translators also absorbed Japanese word-formation patterns. Taking 主義 (shugi; Chinese: zhǔyì, translating English -ism) as an example, Yishu Huibian not only borrowed established Japanese compounds such as 社會主義 (shakaishugi; Chinese: shèhuì zhǔyì 'socialism'), but also adopted -主義 as a productive suffix-like element. For terms appearing in the journal such as 正統主義 (zhèngtǒng zhǔyì 'orthodoxy; legitimism') and 公然主義 (gōngrán zhǔyì 'openness-ism'), Liu Fanfu and Fan Huiying found no attestations in the Meiji-era Japanese sources they examined and conjectured that translators may have coined them independently using -主義.

Inclusion of Japanese-derived vocabulary also varied across Chinese dictionaries of different periods. For example, the Japanese noun 大統領 (daitōryō; Chinese: dàtǒnglǐng 'president', referring to the head of state of a republic) was included in the 1915 first edition of Ciyuan (辭源), but was not listed as an entry in the 1936 edition of Cihai (辭海).

=== Late Qing and early Republican debates over neologisms ===
==== Criticism of Japanese-derived terms ====
During the late Qing dynasty and early Republican period, officials, scholars, and overseas students engaged in heated debate over the use of Japanese-translated neologisms (then also known as 東語, dōngyǔ, literally 'eastern language') that entered China alongside returning students and translated books. Figures such as Zhang Zhidong, Yan Fu, Lin Shu, Zhang Binglin, and Peng Wenzu strongly criticized both these new terms and the Western learning introduced through the medium of Japanese. The historian Max Ko-wu Huang characterizes these controversies as a "war over neologisms" (新名詞之戰, xīn míngcí zhī zhàn).

Among these critics, an author writing under the signature "Future Junior Lawyer Peng Wenzu" published Neologisms Like a Blind Man on a Blind Horse (盲人瞎馬之新名詞, Mángrén xiāmǎ zhī xīn míngcí) in 1915. Following a general introduction, the book commented on terms and expressions then in circulation in 59 entries, including terms such as 權力 (quánlì 'power; authority'), 義務 (yìwù 'duty; obligation'), 法人 (fǎrén 'legal person'), 經濟 (jīngjì 'economy; economical'), and 衛生 (wèishēng 'hygiene'). In the work, Peng analyzed the form, meaning, and usage of these expressions and proposed Chinese replacements for some of them, even though in writing his critique he himself used Japanese-derived neologisms such as 社會 (shèhuì 'society') and 主義 (zhǔyì '-ism; doctrine'). The table below excerpts selected wasei-kango examples from Peng's critique, presenting his evaluations, rewritings, or explanations according to the specific contexts he cited; citations in the left column refer to later scholarship on the terms, while those in the right column correspond to Peng's original book:

Peng Wenzu's evaluations and rewritings of selected neologisms
| Neologism and context cited by Peng | Peng Wenzu's evaluation, rewriting, or explanation |
|---|---|
| 積極的 (jījí de 'positive; active'; used of 進行, 'proceeding') | Rewrite as 急速 (jísù 'rapidly; urgently') |
| 積極的 (jījí de 'positive; active'; used of 辦事, 'handling affairs') | Rewrite as 熱心 (rèxīn 'enthusiastically; earnestly') |
| 消極的 (xiāojí de 'negative; passive'; used of 進行, 'proceeding') | Rewrite as 緩緩辦理 (huǎnhuǎn bànlǐ 'to handle slowly') or 徐徐前進 (xúxú qiánjìn 'to advance gradually') |
| 具體 (jùtǐ 'concrete'; in 具體方法, jùtǐ fāngfǎ 'concrete method') | Rewrite as 一定方法 (yīdìng fāngfǎ 'definite method') or 明白方法 (míngbai fāngfǎ 'clear method') |
| 抽象 (chōuxiàng 'abstract'; in 抽象文章, chōuxiàng wénzhāng 'abstract writing') | Rewrite as 空汎文章 (kōngfàn wénzhāng 'vague and empty writing') |
| 目的 (mùdì 'purpose; aim') | Judged 目的 acceptable, but preferred 主眼 (zhǔyǎn 'main focus; keynote') |
| 義務 (yìwù 'duty; obligation') | Judged by Peng to be "fluent and acceptable" (通順可取, tōngshùn kěqǔ); no replacement proposed. |
| 要素 (yàosù 'essential element; factor') | Rewrite as 要件 (yàojiàn 'essential condition; requisite', explained by Peng as 重要條件, zhòngyào tiáojiàn 'important condition') |
| 經濟 (jīngjì 'economical'; in the usage 不經濟, bù jīngjì 'uneconomical') | Explained by Peng as 不合算 (bù hésuàn 'not worthwhile; not cost-effective') in his commentary on an example sentence about buying rice |

Wang Fan-sen observed in 2002 that while some of these 59 terms had fallen out of currency, a large proportion continued to shape Chinese sentence construction and prose composition.

==== Yan Fu's competing translations ====
Beyond criticism, another response was to coin new terms or modify Japanese translations. Yan Fu, who translated Western works directly from English and opposed the uncritical adoption of Japanese terms, was a leading figure in this effort, though he also adopted some Japanese translations himself. Yan Fu argued that translated terms should take into account both Western etymology and Chinese philological foundations, and in his translations he coined terms through phonetic transcription (such as transliterating the Western term for nerve as 涅伏, nièfú) as well as semantic translation to rival Japanese-coined terms. At the end of 1909, the Qing Ministry of Education established the Office for the Compilation and Standardization of Terminology (編訂名詞館, Biāndìng Míngcíguǎn) to review and standardize academic terms, appointing Yan Fu as its chief editor. The table below compares Yan Fu's translations, the corresponding wasei-kango, and the standard modern Chinese terms. Here the "Wasei-kango" column includes both newly coined Japanese compounds and modern Japanese translations repurposed from classical Chinese forms.

Comparison of Yan Fu's translations and standard modern Chinese terms
| English (or original foreign term) | Yan Fu's translation | Wasei-kango | Standard modern Chinese term |
|---|---|---|---|
| aggregate 拓都 (tuòdū) may approximate the pronunciation of total | 拓都 (tuòdū, phonetic rendering) | 団体 (dantai 'group; organization') | 團體 (tuántǐ 'group; organization') |
| unit | 么匿 (yāonì, phonetic rendering) | 個人 (kojin 'individual'); Refers to an individual person making up a human group | 單位 (dānwèi 'unit'; 個人, gèrén 'individual' in the context of a human group) |
| nerve | 涅伏 (nièfú, phonetic rendering) | 神経 (shinkei 'nerve') | 神經 (shénjīng 'nerve') |
| organism | 官品 (guānpǐn) | 有機体 (yūkitai 'organism') | 有機體 (yǒujītǐ 'organism') |
| organize, organization | 部勒 (bùlè, classical term for 'to deploy and command') | 組織 (soshiki 'to organize; organization') | 組織 (zǔzhī 'to organize; organization') |
| sociology | 群學 (qúnxué 'study of human grouping') | 社会学 (shakaigaku 'sociology') | 社會學 (shèhuìxué 'sociology') |
| logic | 名學 (míngxué 'study of names/logic'; also used phonetic 邏輯, luójí) | 論理学 (ronrigaku 'logic') | 邏輯 (luójí 'logic'), 邏輯學 (luójíxué 'logic') |
| right (in the context of natural rights in John Stuart Mill's writings) | Tended to use 天直 (tiānzhí 'heaven-endowed due'), 民直 (mínzhí 'people's due') | – 權利 (quánlì, Japanese 権利, kenri 'right') originated as a Chinese translation term and returned to China via Japan | 權利 (quánlì 'right') |

The shifting fortunes of Yan Fu's translations and Japanese-derived neologisms were reflected in the vocabulary entries of late Qing encyclopedic dictionaries. The 1903 Xin Erya (新爾雅) still included many of Yan Fu's renderings, whereas the 1911 Putong Baike Xin Dacidian (普通百科新大辭典, 'New Great Encyclopedia of General Knowledge'), compiled by Huang Ren with a preface by Yan Fu, largely adopted Japanese-derived terms while still listing Yan's equivalents such as 名學 (míngxué) under entries like 論理學 (lùnlǐxué 'logic'). Max Ko-wu Huang notes that this contest over translated terminology continued into the early Republican period, and by the 1920s most of the Japanese translation terms had prevailed over the alternatives proposed by Yan Fu and others, becoming widely used in Chinese publications. He attributes their widespread currency to two main factors: dissemination through mass newspapers and periodicals, translated books, textbooks, and encyclopedic dictionaries; and their morphological regularity, which allowed sets of related new terms to be systematically derived from shared roots or suffixes.

=== Transmission into other East Asian languages ===
A shared Chinese-character writing system and Classical Chinese literary tradition across historical East Asia facilitated the spread of modern Japanese kanji vocabulary into Korean and Vietnamese. Rather than borrowing Japanese pronunciations directly, recipient languages generally adopted the written kanji forms of Japanese compounds and read them according to their own established character-reading systems, such as Sino-Korean readings, or received them via Chinese.

==== Korean ====
After Joseon opened its ports to Japan in 1876, Korean shifted from sporadic early attestations of Japanese words to a phase of heavier lexical borrowing, well before Japan's formal annexation of the Korean Peninsula. A lexical survey of the 1895 Gukmin sohak dokbon (國民小學讀本, 'Elementary Reader for Citizens') and 37 issues of the Tongnip Sinmun (獨立新聞, 'The Independent') from 7 April to 30 June 1896 showed that, out of 3,621 Sino-Korean words of two or more characters extracted from the texts, 2,393 shared the same character forms as contemporaneous Japanese vocabulary. Of those shared-form words, 2,290 also carried the same meaning in both Japanese and Korean; Chang Won-jae compared their textual attestations across Chinese, Japanese, and Korean sources and considered 229 to be possible Japanese-coined Sino-Japanese terms (Nihon-sei kango), accounting for 10% of that shared-form, shared-meaning group. In absorbing these terms, Korean generally applied Sino-Korean readings directly to the Japanese kanji compounds rather than borrowing Japanese pronunciations; for example, the Japanese calque from Dutch 月曜日 (getsuyōbi 'Monday') was read in Sino-Korean as 월요일 (woryoil).

The table below lists examples of borrowed modern concepts, including both newly coined words and modern senses added to pre-existing Chinese-character words; all are pronounced according to their Sino-Korean readings.

Examples of wasei-kango transmitted into Korean
| Kanji form | Borrowed form and reading | Introduced meaning | Circumstances of introduction and documentation |
|---|---|---|---|
| 社會 | 사회 sahoe | 'society' | Listed by Patrick Heinrich as examples of modern Japanese kanji words borrowed into Korean. |
| 警察 | 경찰 gyeongchal | 'police' | Listed by Patrick Heinrich as examples of modern Japanese kanji words borrowed into Korean. |
| 主義 | 주의 juui | '-ism' (word-forming element) | Listed by Patrick Heinrich as examples of modern Japanese kanji words borrowed into Korean. |
| 出發 | 출발 chulbal | 'departure, setting out' | Classified by Chang Won-jae as a Japanese-coined Sino-Japanese word, with its transmission examined through late 19th-century attestations in the Tongnip Sinmun. |
| 發行 | 발행 balhaeng | 'publication, issuing of periodicals' | Attested in the 1896 Tongnip Sinmun in the sense of publishing a newspaper. Chang Won-jae classifies this sense as a new meaning introduced from Japan. |
| 發明 | 발명 balmyeong | 'invention, creation of something new' | Attested in this sense in the 1895 Gukmin sohak dokbon. Chang Won-jae classifies it as a new meaning introduced from Japan. |
| 電話 | 전화 jeonhwa | 'telephone' | Listed by Chang among the likely Japanese-made terms found in the 1896 Tongnip Sinmun. |
| 廣告 | 광고 gwanggo | 'advertising; publicity' | Listed by Chang among the likely Japanese-made terms found in the 1896 Tongnip Sinmun. |

In Korean, 發行 (발행, balhaeng) originally meant 'setting out on a journey'. Following the borrowing of 出發 (출발, chulbal) and the publishing sense of 發行, the meaning of setting out was gradually taken over by 出發, while 發行 came to be used for publication. Meanwhile, 發明 (발명, balmyeong) and 發見 (발견, balgyeon) came to denote creating something new ('invention') and finding something already in existence ('discovery'), respectively.

==== Vietnamese ====
Vietnamese already possessed a Sino-Vietnamese vocabulary layer borrowed from historical Chinese. During the 19th and 20th centuries, it adopted a body of modern Chinese-character words coined in Japan, which were pronounced upon borrowing according to Sino-Vietnamese readings. While some of these terms entered Vietnamese via Chinese, Japanese terminology also exerted a direct influence on the Vietnamese lexicon, as seen in the compilation of the Vietnamese glossary Danh từ Khoa học ('Scientific Terms').

Examples of wasei-kango transmitted into Vietnamese
| Kanji form | Borrowed form and reading | Introduced meaning | Circumstances of introduction and documentation |
|---|---|---|---|
| 自由 | tự do | 'freedom, liberty' | Modern Chinese-character words introduced during the 19th and 20th centuries. |
| 社會 | xã hội | 'society' | Modern Chinese-character words introduced during the 19th and 20th centuries. |
| 科學 | khoa học | 'science' | Modern Chinese-character words introduced during the 19th and 20th centuries. |
| 原子 | nguyên tử | 'atom' | Modern Chinese-character words introduced during the 19th and 20th centuries. |
| 共和 | cộng hòa | 'republic, republican system of government' | Transmitted via Chinese. |
| 經濟 | kinh tế | 'economy' | Transmitted via Chinese. |
| 美術 | mỹ thuật | 'fine arts' | Transmitted via Chinese. |

In 1942, Hoàng Xuân Hãn published Danh từ Khoa học (科學名詞, 'Scientific Terms'), which compared French and Chinese terminology in mathematics, physics, chemistry, mechanics, and astronomy in order to establish Vietnamese equivalents. In his preface, he also noted that he had consulted Japanese specialized dictionaries and textbooks. Jun'ichi Iwatsuki regards this as documentary evidence of Japanese terminology directly influencing the compilation of the Vietnamese lexicon.

Adjustments in meaning and word order also occurred after borrowing. For example, 博士, whose meaning had been adapted by Japanese intellectuals to denote a modern university doctoral degree, was recorded as bác sĩ in that sense in a 1917 vocabulary list in Nam Phong magazine (Nam Phong tạp chí, 南風雜誌); in contemporary Vietnamese, however, bác sĩ refers to a medical doctor, while the doctoral degree is instead expressed by tiến sĩ (進士), a term originating from the imperial civil service examination degree. Regarding word order, a Sino-Vietnamese dictionary first published in 1932 (2009 edition) and a 2003 Vietnamese dictionary record the term for 'natural science' (自然科學) in the forms tự nhiên khoa học (literally 'natural science') and khoa học tự nhiên (literally 'science natural'), respectively. Nguyễn Đình Hiền and Nguyễn Tuấn Cường view the latter word order as an adaptation to the head-initial structure of Vietnamese, where such noun phrases place the main noun before its modifier.

== Determining word origins ==
Even when Chinese and Japanese texts contain the same sequence of characters, they do not necessarily record the same word. Determining whether a term originated in Japan requires comparing historical usages in both languages alongside contemporary readings, morphological structure, and semantics; for modern translation terms, it also involves tracing the foreign concepts being rendered and the channels of transmission.

=== Scope of research ===
In his research on Sino-Japanese vocabulary, Yoshio Yamada discussed Japanese derivatives of kango, "Japanese-made Sino-Japanese words" (日本製の漢語, nihon-sei no kango), and "native Japanese–Sino-Japanese hybrid words" separately. Focusing specifically on wasei-kango, Chen Liwei examined their formation, morphology, and scope from ancient to modern times.

Based on word form and meaning, Chen divides wasei-kango into two broad categories, "independent Japanese creations" (日本独自の創出, nihon dokuji no sōshutsu) and "forms derived from existing Chinese words" (中国語出自, chūgokugo shutsuji), which are further subdivided into five types. "Independent Japanese creations" comprise three types: pre-existing native Japanese words (wago) whose kanji spellings shifted from kun'yomi (native Japanese readings assigned to Chinese characters) to on'yomi (Sino-Japanese readings); character combinations or orthographic forms uniquely created in Japan; and Chinese-character translation terms coined from the Bakumatsu period (late Edo period) onward. "Forms derived from existing Chinese words" comprise two types: word forms attested in premodern Chinese texts that have a different morphological structure in Japanese than in Chinese; and classical Chinese word forms repurposed to translate Western concepts.

From the late 16th century onward, Western missionaries in China introduced Western things and concepts to East Asia, prompting the Sinosphere to coin modern neologisms and translation terms. Modern Sino-Japanese lexical exchange encompasses words formed in China and transmitted to Japan, words formed in Japan and transmitted to China, and words formed, standardized, or recirculated through the joint participation of both countries. Shen Guowei refers to neologisms and translation terms that originated primarily in China and later entered Japan as "Chinese neologisms" (中國新詞, Zhōngguó xīncí). Hu Xinxiang collectively terms the Chinese-character words coined in modern China and Japan to translate new Western concepts "modern new kango" (近代新漢語, jìndài xīn Hànyǔ), classifying them by place of creation into "Chinese-made new kango" (華製新漢語, Huázhì xīn Hànyǔ) for words coined in China and "Japanese-made new kango" (和製新漢語, Hézhì xīn Hànyǔ; Japanese: wasei shin-kango) for words coined in Japan.

Taking both origin and direction of transmission into account, Chen Liwei groups modern Chinese-character neologisms into three categories:

1. Terms coined in China and transmitted to Japan, such as 電氣 (diànqì 'electricity'), 電報 (diànbào 'telegraph'), 地球 (dìqiú 'the Earth'), 銀行 (yínháng 'bank'), 化學 (huàxué 'chemistry'), 直徑 (zhíjìng 'diameter'), and 風琴 (fēngqín 'organ').
2. Classical Chinese terms adopted in Japan to translate foreign concepts and transmitted to China with new meanings, such as 革命 (kakumei, Chinese gémìng 'revolution'), 文化 (bunka, wénhuà 'culture'), 觀念 (Japanese 観念, kannen 'concept; idea'), 福祉 (fukushi, fúzhǐ 'welfare'), 文明 (bunmei, wénmíng 'civilization'), 經濟 (Japanese 経済, keizai 'economy'), 社會 (Japanese 社会, shakai 'society'), and 宗教 (shūkyō, zōngjiào 'religion').
3. Terms coined in Japan and transmitted to China, such as 哲學 (Japanese 哲学, tetsugaku 'philosophy'), 喜劇 (kigeki, Chinese xǐjù 'comedy'), 郵便 (yūbin, yóubiàn 'postal service'), and 美學 (Japanese 美学, bigaku 'aesthetics').

=== Identical forms in Chinese and Japanese ===
Proceeding from the traditional classification of Japanese lexical strata (goshu), Masaru Tajima argues that an on'yomi reading is a necessary condition for a word to be classified as Sino-Japanese vocabulary. He treats "words written in kanji" as an orthographic classification that should be kept distinct from lexical classification by origin. Consequently, he expresses reservations about Chen Liwei's inclusion of jukujikun (meaning-based multi-character native readings), yutō-yomi (hybrid kun–on readings), jūbako-yomi (hybrid on–kun readings), and kun'yomi words within a broad category of what Chen terms "Japanese kango". By contrast, pre-existing native words that came to be read with on'yomi can be classified as wasei-kango.

Words whose written forms already existed in Chinese texts but acquired new meanings in Japanese are also treated in different ways. Chen Liwei excludes simple semantic shifts that occurred gradually as Chinese loanwords were assimilated into Japanese, but includes as wasei-kango words that developed new meanings because their constituents have a different morphological relationship in Japanese than in Chinese. Classical Chinese word forms that acquired new conceptual meanings in modern Japanese are also included in broader discussions of wasei-kango. To illustrate simple semantic shift, Chen cites words such as 我慢 (gaman 'patience / endurance'), 退屈 (taikutsu 'boredom'), 挨拶 (aisatsu 'greeting'), 馳走 (chisō 'feast / hospitality'), 料理 (ryōri 'cooking / cuisine'), and 勉強 (benkyō 'study'): although these word forms originated in Chinese, their meanings in Japanese have diverged substantially from their original Chinese senses. Such assimilation-driven semantic changes are generally treated as part of the individual history of each word.

Identical character combinations can have different internal structures in the two languages: in 洋行 (yángháng 'Western-owned firm'), Chinese 洋 ('foreign/Western') modifies 行 ('firm'), whereas in Japanese 洋行 (yōkō 'traveling to the West'), 洋 denotes the destination of 行 ('to go'), leading Chen Liwei to classify the Japanese word as a wasei-kango.

Disputes over the etymology of 義務 (yìwù, Japanese gimu 'duty; obligation') turn on the punctuation of classical Chinese texts, as different collated editions punctuate the passage differently. Tōru Satō once read the adjacent characters 義 ('righteousness; duty') and 務 ('to devote oneself to; task') in the Zhonglun (中論, Balanced Discourses) together as a single word, treating the passage as an early attestation of the compound. Sun Jianjun, however, argues that the sentence should be punctuated across a clause boundary as 言朋友之義，務在切直以升於善道也 ('speaking of the duty between friends, the essential task lies in earnest frankness so as to ascend to the good way'), assigning 義 and 務 to the end of the preceding clause and the beginning of the following clause, respectively. Kiyohide Arakawa endorses this latter reading and points out that even when an identical sequence of characters appears in a premodern text, one must still verify whether it actually forms a single lexical item. As for the word formation of 義務, Sun speculates that it may have been constructed according to Japanese object–verb word order on the model of phrases such as 義を務む (gi o tsutomu 'to fulfill one's duty'), whereas Arakawa expresses reservations and suggests alternative possibilities such as an abbreviation of 'public righteousness and public duty' (公義公務, kōgi kōmu) or a modifier–head structure meaning 'a duty based on moral obligation'.

=== Early attestations of modern translation terms ===
Dictionaries do not always preserve complete textual evidence for early translations of Western learning, so relying on dictionaries alone can overlook earlier attestations. Consulting additional primary sources can also alter etymological attributions. In A Study of Loanwords in Modern Chinese (現代漢語外來詞研究, Xiàndài Hànyǔ Wàiláicí Yánjiū), Gao Mingkai and Liu Zhengtan listed 91 words as being of "purely Japanese" origin. After re-examining the list against 19th-century English–Chinese and Chinese–English dictionaries as well as texts cited in the Hanyu Da Cidian, Kazuko Miyata concluded that 35 of the 91 words originated in Japanese and 49 had originally come from Chinese, while the origins of the remaining 7 remained undetermined. For example, Tatsuo Aoyagi had dated the earliest appearance of 表現 (hyōgen, Chinese biǎoxiàn 'expression') to the 1881 Tetsugaku Jii (哲学字彙, Philosophical Dictionary), but Miyata found it already listed as one of the translations for display in Wilhelm Lobscheid's earlier English and Chinese Dictionary (英華字典). She also noted that her survey primarily addressed lexical provenance, leaving semantic shifts and mutual Sino-Japanese influences for further study.

Even when a dictionary already records a translation equivalent, the modern sense of a word may not yet have stabilized. Both 文學 (wénxué, Japanese 文学, bungaku 'literature') and 教育 (jiàoyù, Japanese 教育, kyōiku 'education') appear in the Analects and the Mencius, respectively, and mid-19th-century English–Chinese dictionaries already used them to translate literature and education. At that time, however, Chinese 教育 was mostly used as a verb ('to educate; to nurture'), while 文學 could still refer broadly to scholarship or learning, encompassing what would later be called education; when Mori Arinori's English book Education in Japan was published in Chinese translation in Shanghai in 1896, it was titled Wénxué Xīngguó Cè (文學興國策, literally 'Policies for Strengthening the Nation through Learning'). Japan adopted 教育 earlier in its school system and established 文学 earlier as the name of an academic discipline. In the early 20th century, as the Japanese educational system and disciplinary terminology were introduced into China, the noun 教育 spread rapidly while the semantic scope of 文學 narrowed. Chen Liwei proposes classifying such terms, which already had translation equivalents in China but acquired their modern conceptual meanings through usage in Japan, as "Sino-Japanese collaborative neologisms" (中日合作新詞, Zhōng-Rì hézuò xīncí).

The word 解剖 (jiěpōu 'dissection / anatomy') already appears in the Lingshu (靈樞) section of the ancient medical text Huangdi Neijing, where it refers to cutting open a corpse for examination. As a translation for Western anatomy, late 18th-century Japan used terms such as 解体 (kaitai 'dismantling / dissection of the body'), before gradually settling on 解剖学 (kaibōgaku 'anatomy'); meanwhile, Western missionaries in mid-19th-century China used terms such as 全體 (quántǐ 'the whole body / anatomy') and 全體學 (quántǐxué 'study of the whole body / anatomy').

=== Return loans ===
Words that already existed in Classical Chinese, acquired new meanings in Japanese, and later returned to Chinese, such as 經濟 (jīngjì; Japanese: 経済, keizai 'economy'), are referred to as "return loans" (回歸詞, huíguīcí 'return words') in the introduction to Academia Sinica's database of modern Chinese neologisms.

The place where a translation term was coined is not necessarily the place that later drove its popularization. The term 權利 (quánlì, Japanese 権利, kenri 'right') underwent a round-trip transmission from Chinese into Japanese and then back into Chinese. W. A. P. Martin used 權利 in his 1864 translation Elements of International Law (萬國公法, Wànguó Gōngfǎ) to render the Western legal concept of a 'right', and this translation term was subsequently transmitted to Japan, where Tsuda Mamichi, Mitsukuri Rinshō, and others adopted it in legal translations; by the 1880s it was in widespread use in Japan. Although the term did not initially circulate widely in China, it gained prominence there in the late 19th and early 20th centuries under the influence of Japanese legal scholarship. Lin Laifan cites Zhang Zongxiang's 1900 translation of part of Rudolf von Jhering's The Struggle for Law (Chinese: 權利競爭論, Quánlì Jìngzhēng Lùn) from a Japanese version as an example illustrating the role of Japanese jurisprudence in popularizing 權利 in China.

Some words that had existed in Chinese only at low frequency came into common use under Japanese influence; Shen Guowei terms these "activated words" (激活詞, jīhuócí). For example, the word 戰役 (zhànyì 'military campaign / battle') had only a few attestations in premodern Chinese, where its meaning was not clearly distinguished from general terms for 'war' (戰爭, zhànzhēng) or 'combat' (戰鬥, zhàndòu). In late-19th-century Japan, military dictionaries used 戦役 (sen'eki) for a series of battles within a war, although non-specialist Japanese periodicals still often used it much like 'war'. After 1905, occurrences of 戰役 (zhànyì) increased in the Shanghai newspaper Shen Bao, mostly in coverage of the Russo-Japanese War, on which basis Qiu Ziyang classifies it as an activated word influenced by Japanese. From the 1910s onward, expressions such as "a campaign within a war" (戰爭中的一次戰役) and "the [Name] Campaign" (某某戰役) became more frequent in Shen Bao, and the meaning of 戰役 ('campaign / battle') gradually became differentiated from 戰爭 ('war').

Addressing popular claims that "70 percent of humanities terms come from Japanese", that "Chinese could not function without Japanese loanwords", and that "in People's Republic of China (中華人民共和國, Zhōnghuá Rénmín Gònghéguó), only Zhōnghuá ('China') comes from Chinese while the rest is all wasei-kango", Chen Liwei argues that such assertions lack a defined corpus scope and statistical backing. Linking these claims to nationalist sentiment, he advocates concrete empirical investigation grounded in the history of Sino-Japanese linguistic exchange.

== See also ==
- Classical compounds in English and other Indo-European languages
- Wasei-eigo
- Chinese-coined neologisms for Western concepts
