= Wago =

Native Japanese words

Wago (和語; Japanese pronunciation: [waꜜɡo]) are native Japanese words, meaning those words in Japanese that have been inherited from Old Japanese, rather than being borrowed at some stage. Together with kango (漢語) and gairaigo (外来語), they form one of the three main sources of Japanese words (there is also elaborate Japanese sound symbolism, of mimetic origin). They are also known as yamato kotoba (大和言葉; [jamatokoꜜtoba]).

The word yamato kotoba itself is composed of native Japanese words, and hence is an autological word. The synonym wago is instead a kango, and hence a heterological word.

== Lexical function ==
Yamato kotoba form a fundamental part of the Japanese lexicon, similar to native words (from Old English) in English – while borrowed words are used for many technical terms (particularly kango, as with Latin and Greek in English), or for modern or stylish purposes (mostly gairaigo, as with French in English), much of the core vocabulary and commonly used everyday words are of native origin.

As exhibited in the synonyms yamato kotoba/wago, there are often many synonyms from different origins, usually with differences in usage. Very roughly, kango are generally more formal, often restricted to writing, while yamato kotoba are more casual and more often used in speech, but both types of words are commonly used in both speech and writing.

In Japanese names, the family name is generally formed from yamato kotoba, as in 山下 (yama-shita, mountain-bottom), 大岡 (oo-oka, big-hill), and 小林 (ko-bayashi, small/little-forest), while given names are quite diverse.

== Phonology ==
Yamato kotoba are generally polysyllabic (often three or more syllables), and more closely follow the CV (consonant-vowel, CVCVCV) pattern of Old Japanese. By contrast, kango are often one or two syllables, and more often have terminal consonants, yōon, and long vowels.

== Grammatical function ==
Yamato kotoba function differently grammatically from borrowed words. While borrowed words can be nouns, which can function as verbs via adding the auxiliary verb -suru (〜する; (to) do) or attributively via 〜な -na or 〜の -no, borrowed words cannot become true Japanese verbs (う- or る-verbs) or adjectives (い-adjectives) – these are a closed class (with rare exceptions, such as the verb サボる, from the French word "sabotage," or ググる, from "(to) google").

Japanese adjectives and grammatical words (notably particles) are also Yamato kotoba.

Japanese has a great many compound verbs, such as 待ち合わせる (machi-awaseru, to rendezvous, from 待つ + 合わせる), which are formed from native verbs, not borrowings. However, in nouns, native Japanese roots and Chinese borrowings (and in some cases more modern European borrowings) can combine.

== Numbers ==
For most purposes, Japanese uses Chinese numbers, rather than native numbers. However, native numbers are often used for counting numbers of items up to 10 – as in hitotsu, futatsu, mittsu (one item, two items, three items), notably days on the calendar, and with other Japanese counter words – and for various exceptions (fossils). These exceptions include 20 years old (二十歳, hatachi), the 20th day of a month (二十日, hatsuka), greengrocer (八百屋, yaoya; literally "800 store"), and last day of the year (大晦日, ōmisoka; literally "big 30th day").

== Writing ==
Yamato kotoba are often written in a mixture of kanji and hiragana. Grammatical words are written using hiragana (there is often a traditional kanji, which is today rarely used), as are the inflectional ends of verbs and adjectives, which are known as okurigana. Content words (nouns, roots of verbs and adjectives) are generally written in kanji with kun'yomi, with the meanings of the kanji used corresponding to the meaning of the word. However, the word may be written in hiragana, particularly if the kanji are uncommon. Further, some yamato kotoba are written using unrelated kanji (used only for their sound value), which is known as ateji, or using kanji whose meaning is correct but whose sounds are not, which is known as jukujikun.

Katakana is generally not used for yamato kotoba, but can be used for emphasis (especially for mimetic words), and for legibility when spelling out a word.

== See also ==
- Gairaigo
- Sino-Japanese vocabulary
