= Hanako (given name) =

- Pronunciation: han-nah-koh
- Gender: Female

Origin
- Origin: Japanese
- Meaning: Different meanings depending on the kanji used
- Region of origin: Japan

Other names
- Related names: Hana; Kanako

Hanako is a female Japanese given name. The name can have different meanings, one of them being 花子, meaning "flower child", and another being 華子 (華 is a kanji of many uses - 'splendor', 'flower', 'petal', 'shine', 'luster', 'ostentatious', 'showy'. 子 is the second kanji, meaning 'child').

It is often seen as an archetypal name for females. It was a popular name for female elephants in Japan imported in the late 1940s and early 1950s; the first part of the name, Hana, could be taken as reference to an elephant's nose.

== People ==
- Hanako Footman (born 1994), British-Japanese actress and writer
- Hanako Greensmith (born 1996), American actress
- Hanako Honda (本多 花子; 1909-1968), Japanese politician
- Hanako Jimi (自見 英子; born 1976), Japanese politician
- Hanako Miura (三浦 華子; born 1975), Japanese gymnast
- Hanako Muraoka (村岡 花子; 1893–1968), Japanese novelist and translator
- Hanako Nakamori (中森 華子; born 1988), Japanese professional wrestler
- Hanako Okada (岡田 華子; born 1980), Japanese lawyer and politician
- Hanako Oku (奥 華子; born 1978), Japanese singer and songwriter
- Hanako Oshima (大島 花子; born 1973), Japanese singer
- Hanako Takigawa (多岐川 華子; born 1988), Japanese actress, tarento and gravure idol
- Hanako Tokachi (十勝 花子; 1946–2016), Japanese actress and tarento
- Hanako Tsugaru, later Hanako, Princess Hitachi of Japan
- Hanako Ueda (上田 華子; born 2000), Japanese professional wrestler
- Hanako Utsumi (内海 春菜子; born 2000), Japanese rugby sevens player
- Hisa Ōta (1868–1945), Japanese actress whose stage name was "Hanako"

== Fictional characters ==
- Hanako (ハナコ) or Delia Ketchum, the mother of protagonist Ash Ketchum (Satoshi) in the Pokémon anime
- Hanako, a character of the manga Hanako and the Terror of Allegory
- Hanako, a character of the drama Hanako to Anne
- Hanako Hanazawa, a classmate character from Sazae-san
- Hanako Ikezawa, a heroine with debilitating social anxiety derived from her burn scars from the visual novel Katawa Shoujo
- Hanako Ichiro, a Shiba Inu owned by Inuyashiki Ichiro, from the manga Inuyashiki by Hiroya Oku
- Hanako-kun (ghost), formerly Amane Yugi, the title character from the anime and manga series Toilet-Bound Hanako-kun
- Hanako Ohmuro, a character from YuruYuri
- Hanako-san, yokai in the girl toilet in Friday the 13th and Tuesday the 13th
- Hanako Sonoyama, a character from Little Battlers Experience WARS
- Hanako Urawa, a character from Blue Archive
- Hanako Yamada, a character of the video game Yandere Simulator
- Hanako Yumadagi, a main and protagonist of character of anime series Ongaku Shoujo

== Other ==
- Hanako (elephant) (1947–2016), an elephant who lived in Japan
- Hanako (fish), a fish which lived to be more than 200 years old
