= Hanako =

Hanako may refer to:

== People ==
- Hanako (given name) meaning Flower Child, including list of persons and fictional characters with the name
- Hanako, Princess Hitachi, Hanako Tsugaru, later Princess Hitachi of Japan
- Hanako Takigawa (1988) Japanese gravure model, actress and TV talent
- Hanako Oshima, Japanese musician
- Ōta Hisa (1868–1945), a Japanese actress who toured Europe and posed for Auguste Rodin and went by the name Hanako

== Other uses ==
- Hanako (elephant) (1947-2016), an elephant who lived in Japan
- Hanako (fish), a fish which lived for over two hundred years
- Hanako, film by Makoto Satō (director)
- Hanako (magazine), a women's magazine in Japan
- Hanako Games, a developer of downloadable computer games
- Hanako-san, a Japanese urban legend about the ghost of a young girl who haunts school bathrooms
- "Hanako" (Yoko Ono song), a bonus track on Japanese release of Between My Head and the Sky
- Hanako, a play by Chungmi Kim that is also known as Nabi and Comfort Women
