= Toyo Eiwa Jogakuin =

Private girls academy in Azabu, Minato, Tokyo, Japan

Coordinates: 35°30′33″N 139°30′38″E

Tōyō Eiwa Jogakuin
- 東洋英和女学院; Tōyō Eiwa Jogakuin
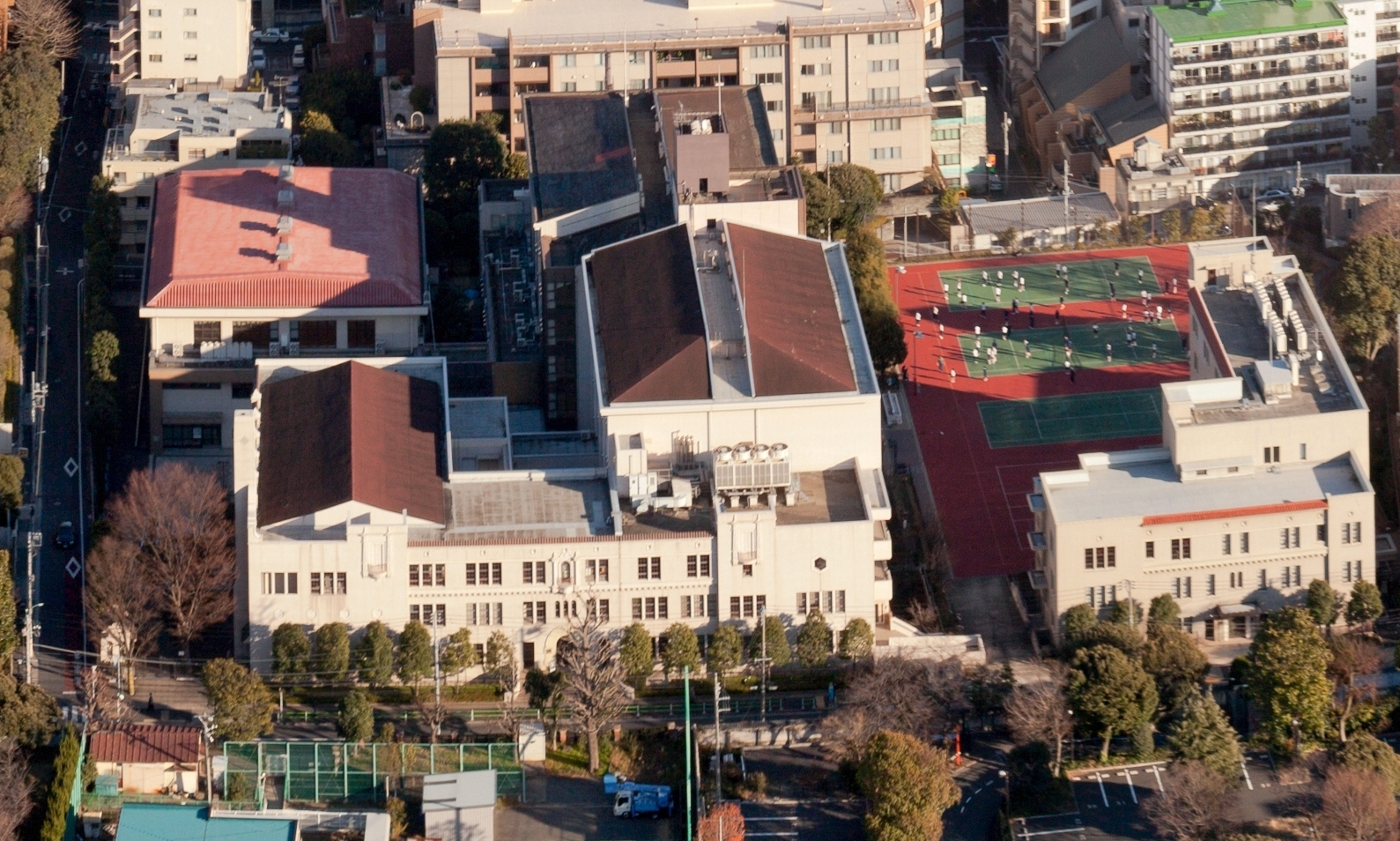
- Type: Private
- Established: 1884
- Location: Roppongi, Minato, Tokyo, Japan
- Website: Official website

Tōyō Eiwa Jogakuin (東洋英和女学院, Tōyō Eiwa Jogakuin) is a private girls academy founded on November 6, 1884, in Azabu, Minato, Tokyo by Martha J. Cartmell, a Methodist missionary from Canada. Toyo Eiwa Women's University, established as a four-year college in 1989, is attached to the school.

== History ==
Originally begun in 1884 with two students, an elementary school was added in 1888, and a senior high school in 1889. The school expanded to include a kindergarten class in 1914, a dormitory, kindergarten building, and a house for the Methodist missionaries in 1932, and a brand new building for the school in 1933.

Due to the anti-Western sentiment during World War II, the Ei (英) (meaning "English") in Eiwa (英和) was changed to Ei (永), meaning "eternal" or "eternity", in 1941. The name was changed back in 1946. Because of the changes made in the Japanese education system following World War II, each department changed its name to reflect the new government-approved names. In 1965, facilities were expanded to include a location at Oiwake, Karuizawa, Nagano Prefecture and camp was established in 1970 at Lake Nojiri.

In 1986, the junior college was moved to a campus in Midori-ku, Yokohama, the attached women's university became a four-year college in 1989, and opened its graduate school in 1993.

== Schools ==
- Toyo Eiwa University
- Tōyō Eiwa Girls' Junior & Senior High School
- Tōyō Eiwa Girls' Primary School
- Tōyō Eiwa Kindergarten (co-ed)
- Tōyō Eiwa University Kaede Kindergarten (co-ed), located in Aoba-ku, Yokohama

== Notable graduates ==
- Misako Yasui, legislator
- Ruiko Yoshida, photojournalist
- Katayama Hiroko, translator and mentor to Hanako Muraoka
- Byakuren Yanagiwara, writer and confidante of Hanako Muraoka
- Hanako Muraoka, translator into Japanese of the Anne of Green Gables novels and other Western literature
- Junko Endo, wife of Shūsaku Endō
- Fumiko Higashikuni, picture book writer and member of Higashikuni-no-miya
- Sawako Agawa, television personality
- Eri Muraoka, daughter of Haruko Muraoka
- Nobuko Imai, violist
- Tae Ashida, fashion designer
- Mieko Yagi, equestrian
- Karin Miyawaki, fencer
- Mieko Takamine, actress
- Keiko Han, voice actress
- Hanako Oshima, singer
- Miho Ohwada, actress

== In popular culture ==
- Rei Hino, also known as Sailor Mars in the anime series Sailor Moon, attends T*A Girls Academy, a private Catholic school, which is based on Tōyō Eiwa Jogakuin.

== See also ==
- List of high schools in Tokyo
