= Quiz $ Millionaire =

Japanese television quiz show

- Logo (2000–2011)
- Also known as: Who Wants to Be a Millionaire?
- Japanese: クイズ$ミリオネア
- Based on: Who Wants to Be a Millionaire? by: David Briggs; Steven Knight; Mike Whitehill
- Directed by: Keiichi Tanaka
- Presented by: Monta Mino (2000–2013); Kazunari Ninomiya (2026)
- Narrated by: Seigo M. Takei (2000); Kyōya Kimura (2000–2013); Tsutomu Tareki (2026); Yūji Machi (2026)
- Composers: Keith Strachan; Matthew Strachan
- Country of origin: Japan
- Original language: Japanese

Production
- Producers: Toshihiko Matsuo; Hanako Aso; Hiroyasu Hanazono
- Running time: 53–280 minutes
- Production company: Fuji Television

Original release
- Network: FNS (Fuji TV)
- Release: April 20, 2000 – July 25, 2026

Quiz $ Millionaire (クイズ$ミリオネア, Kuizu $ Mirionea), sometimes referred to as Who Wants to Be a Millionaire?, is a Japanese quiz show based on the original program of the latter title created by Celador International and currently owned and licensed by Sony Pictures. It premiered on Fuji Television on April 20, 2000, and aired its latest episode on July 25, 2026. The show was hosted by television personality Monta Mino (みの もんた, Mino Monta) until 2013 and actor Kazunari Ninomiya (二宮 和也, Ninomiya Kazunari) in 2026.

The main goal of the game is to win ¥10,000,000 by answering twelve multiple-choice questions correctly. There are three lifelines - Fifty-Fifty (フィフティ・フィフティ, Fifuti Fifuti), Phone-a-Friend (テレフォン, Terefon) (a phone call to an unlimited number of supporters (as long as it is four or less) who are in one place), and Ask The Host (アスク・ザ・ホスト, Asuku Za Hosuto). Whenever a contestant answers the second question correct, they are guaranteed ¥100,000. When a contestant answers the seventh question correct, they are guaranteed ¥1,000,000.

This version has the distinction of having the most top prize winners in the worldwide Millionaire franchise. Seigo M. Takei (武居“M”征吾, Takei Emu Seigo) was the announcer of the show until August of its debut year, Kyōya Kimura (木村 匡也, Kimura Kyōya) until 2013, Tsutomu Tareki (垂木 勉, Tareki Tsutomu) in January 2026 and Yūji Machi (真地 勇志, Machi Yūji) in July 2026.

== Broadcast history ==
The show was broadcast every Thursday regularly from April 20, 2000 to March 29, 2007. From May 3, 2007 onward, the show was brought back for occasional specials, with the most recent one being broadcast July 25, 2026. The next one will be broadcast on January 1, 2027.

=== Super Millionaire ===
Super Millionaire was a spin-off of Quiz $ Millionaire. The show was broadcast twice, with the first episode raising the grand prize to ¥20 million. The series also added four new rules:

- There were only 10 questions, as opposed to the normal 15.
- Questions 1-5 had 4 choices, and 6-10 had 2 choices, meaning contestants could not use 50:50 after the 5th question.
- Contestants could not walk away on the 9th or 10th questions.
- There were no guaranteed sums.

=== Clock format ===
In 2009, the series became the first international version of Millionaire to adopt the clock format from the American version of the show. Contestants now have time limits for each question: 30 seconds each for questions 1–9, 1 minute each for questions 10–12, and 3 minutes each for questions 13–15. Usage of lifelines temporarily pauses the clock. However, unlike the US version, the remaining time after giving an answer for that question is void. Contestants who exceed the time limit on a given question without giving a "final answer" are forced to walk away with whatever winnings they have at that point.

== Payout Structure ==
Answering a question correctly is worth a specific cash prize at each level. Contestants who successfully answer questions on levels with bolded amounts in the table below are guaranteed to leave with no less than the cash award at that level should they incorrectly answer a later question.

Regular payout (2000–2013)
| Question number | Question value |
|---|---|
| 1 | ¥10,000 |
| 2 | ¥20,000 |
| 3 | ¥30,000 |
| 4 | ¥50,000 |
| 5 | **¥100,000** |
| 6 | ¥150,000 |
| 7 | ¥250,000 |
| 8 | ¥500,000 |
| 9 | ¥750,000 |
| 10 | **¥1,000,000** |
| 11 | ¥1,500,000 |
| 12 | ¥2,500,000 |
| 13 | ¥5,000,000 |
| 14 | ¥7,500,000 |
| 15 | **¥10,000,000** |

Super Millionaire payout
| Question number | December 23, 2007 | March 27, 2008 |
|---|---|---|
| 1 | ¥10,000 | |
| 2 | ¥100,000 | |
| 3 | ¥250,000 | |
| 4 | ¥500,000 | |
| 5 | ¥1,000,000 | |
| 6 | ¥2,500,000 | ¥1,500,000 |
| 7 | ¥5,000,000 | ¥2,500,000 |
| 8 | ¥10,000,000 | ¥5,000,000 |
| 9 | ¥15,000,000 | ¥7,500,000 |
| 10 | **¥20,000,000** | **¥10,000,000** |

Payout (2026)
| Question number | Question value |
|---|---|
| 1 | ¥50,000 |
| 2 | **¥100,000** |
| 3 | ¥150,000 |
| 4 | ¥200,000 |
| 5 | ¥300,000 |
| 6 | ¥500,000 |
| 7 | **¥1,000,000** |
| 8 | ¥1,500,000 |
| 9 | ¥2,000,000 |
| 10 | ¥3,000,000 |
| 11 | ¥5,000,000 |
| 12 | **¥10,000,000** |

== Top prize winners ==
=== Civilians ===
| Name | Transliteration | Date |
|---|---|---|
| 國光恭幸 | Yasuyuki Kunimitsu | July 27, 2000 |
| 永田喜彰 | Yoshiaki Nagata | August 10, 2000 |
| 今尾奈緒子 | Naoko Imao | November 2, 2000 |
| 能勢一幸 | Kazuyuki Nose | February 15, 2001 |
| 坂本ひとみ | Hitomi Sakamoto | December 13, 2001 |
| 菊地晃史 | Akifumi Kikuchi | June 27, 2002 |
| 江口みち子 | Michiko Eguchi | August 1, 2002 |
| 長田直美 | Naomi Nagata | November 14, 2002 |
| 三島祥子 | Shōko Mishima | May 8, 2003 |
| 菊池友久 | Tomohisa Kikuchi | April 28, 2005 |
| 濱田敏彦 | Toshihiko Hamada | May 26, 2005 |
| 野添潤子 | Junko Nozoe | June 29, 2006 |
| 大井恵子 | Keiko Ōi | July 27, 2006 |

=== Kids ===
| Name | Transliteration | Date |
|---|---|---|
| 小林宏太郎 | Koutaro Kobayashi | September 6, 2001 |
| 南川克博 | Katsuhiro Minamigawa | September 6, 2001 |
| 棚橋紗夕 | Sayuu Tanabashi | September 4, 2003 |
| 片岡菜摘 | Natsumi Kataoka | September 4, 2003 |
| 黄原暁 | Jō Kihara | August 26, 2004 |

=== Celebrities ===
| Name | Transliteration | Date |
|---|---|---|
| 馳浩 | Hiroshi Hase | November 23, 2000 |
| 鈴木大地 | Daichi Suzuki | September 18, 2003 |
| 新庄剛志 | Tsuyoshi Shinjo | January 2, 2004 |
| 堀江貴文 | Takafumi Horie | December 30, 2004 |
| 細木数子 | Kazuko Hosoki | December 30, 2004 |
| 堺正章 | Masaaki Sakai | April 7, 2005 |
| 田中康夫 | Yasuo Tanaka | April 7, 2005 |
| 柏木由紀子 and 大島花子 | Yukiko Kashiwagi and Hanako Oshima | April 21, 2005 |
| 小泉孝太郎 | Kotaro Koizumi | January 2, 2006 |
| 浅野ゆう子 | Yūko Asano | March 23, 2006 |
| 為末大 | Dai Tamesue | September 14, 2006 |
| 坂東三津五郎 (10代目) | Bandō Mitsugorō X | October 5, 2006 |
| デヴィ・スカルノ | Dewi Sukarno | October 26, 2006 |
| 紺野美沙子 | Misako Konno | February 15, 2007 |
| 谷原章介 | Shōsuke Tanihara | July 5, 2007 |
| 富司純子 | Sumiko Fuji | March 27, 2008 |
| 徳光和夫 | Kazuo Tokumitsu | March 27, 2008 |
| ビートたけし | Beat Takeshi | January 30, 2009 |
| 太田光 | Hikari Ōta | April 1, 2009 |
| 芦田愛菜 | Mana Ashida | January 2, 2013 |
| 橋本環奈 | Kanna Hashimoto | January 1, 2026 |

== Merchandise ==
Several home versions have been released based on the show. The first of these was a board game released in 2001 by Takara Tomy, who later released another electronic version of the game. A version for the PlayStation game console was released on December 20, 2001, with an updated party version released for the same console in 2002. A book entitled "Complete cheats! Quiz $ Millionaire" (完全攻略! クイズ$ミリオネア, Kanzen kōryaku kuizu mirionea), was released by Fusosha on March 20, 2002.

In addition, Visiware and Sony Pictures Television have released an app based on the program's format for iOS and Android devices. Mino introduced the app during the special that aired on January 2, 2013. The app allows home viewers to play the game simultaneously, being asked the same questions featured on the show.
