= Byakuren Yanagiwara =

Japanese poet and novelist

Byakuren Yanagiwara 柳原白蓮
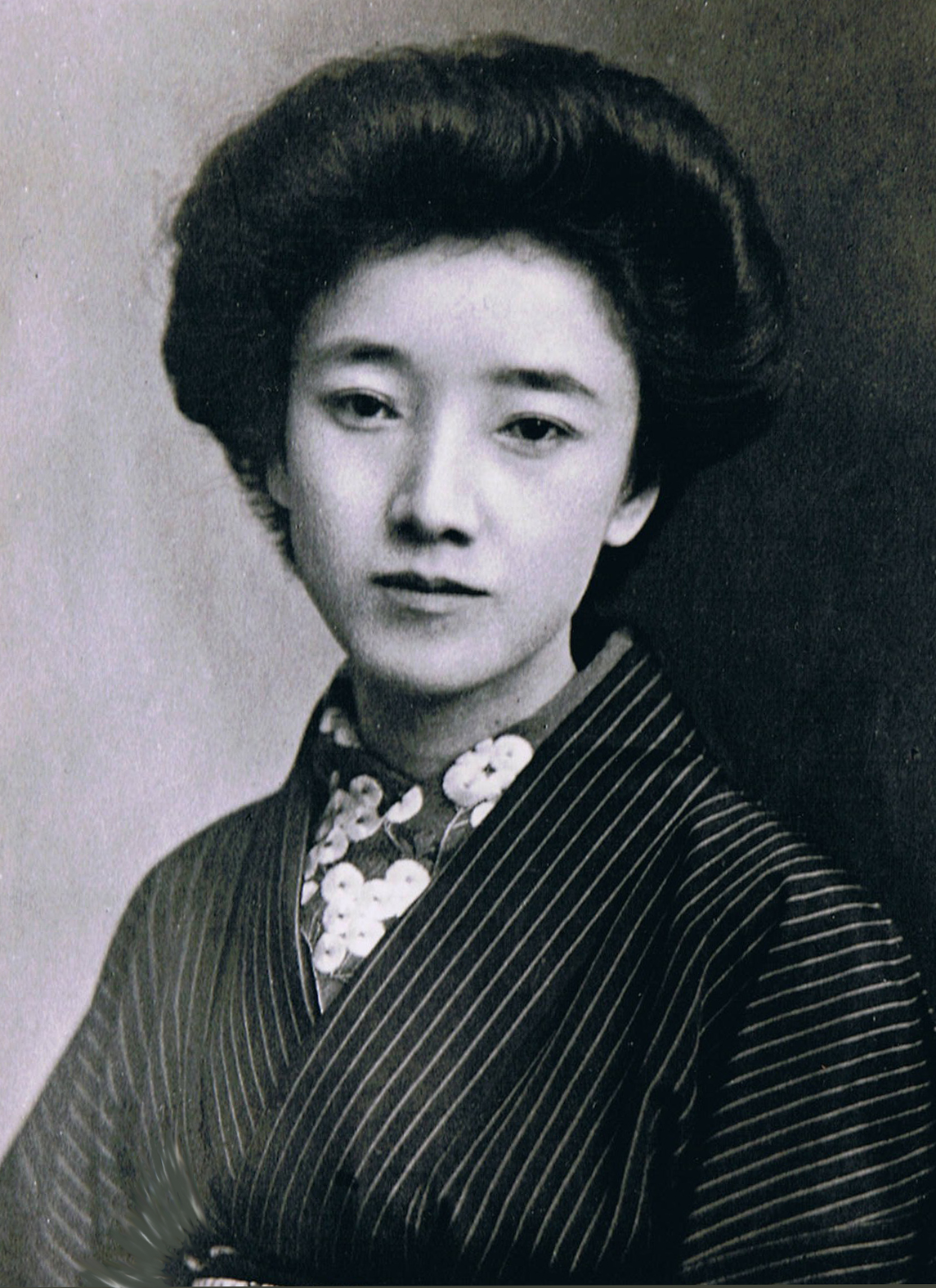
- Byakuren Yanagiwara
- Born: Akiko Yanagiwara; October 15, 1885; Tokyo, Empire of Japan
- Died: January 22, 1967 (aged 81); Tokyo, Japan
- Other names: Akiko Kitakōji; Akiko Itō; Akiko Miyazaki
- Occupations: geisha, Poet, novelist
- Years active: 1915–1956
- Known for: Byakuren incident
- Notable work: Chiheisen (1956); Fumi-e (1915)
- Spouses: Suketake Kitakōji (m. 1900; div. 1905) Denemon Itō (m. 1910; div. 1921) Ryūsuke Miyazaki (m. 1923)
- Children: Isamitsu Kitakōji; Kaori Miyazaki; Fuki Miyazaki
- Father: Yanagiwara Sakimitsu

Akiko Miyazaki (宮崎 燁子, Miyazaki Akiko; née Yanagiwara; October 15, 1885 – February 22, 1967), known by her pen name Byakuren Yanagiwara (柳原 白蓮, Yanagiwara Byakuren), was a Japanese poet and novelist. She is best known for the Byakuren incident. She was one of the Three Beauties of Taishō period.

== Life ==
Akiko Yanagiwara was born on October 15, 1885, in Tokyo as the second daughter of statesman and diplomat Count Yanagiwara Sakimitsu. Her mother was one of his concubines, Ryō, a daughter of a fallen samurai family who was a geisha in Yanagibashi. The Yanagiwara family were of the Reizei family line of the Fujiwara clan. Sakimitsu was the elder brother of Emperor Taishō's mother, Yanagiwara Naruko, making Yanagiwara a first cousin of Emperor Taishō.

In 1894, she was adopted by a distant relative, Viscount Yorimitsu Kitakōji. She entered the Kazoku Girls' School in 1898. In 1900, she was married to the eldest son of the Kitakōji family, Suketake, at the age of 15, after which she dropped out of school due to her pregnancy. She gave birth to her eldest son, Isamitsu, but in 1905 she divorced, leaving Isamitsu to the Kitakōji family, and returned to her parents' house.

Due to the notions of decency prevalent among kazoku families at the time, the divorced daughter was considered disgraced and could not enter the Yanagiwara family's main residence. In 1908, she transferred to Tōyō Eiwa Girls' School, a Canadian mission school in Azabu, Tokyo, as a boarder to resume her studies, which she had given up due to her marriage and childbirth. There she met Hanako Muraoka, a girl eight years younger than her, who became her "confidante" and who she called "Hana-chan". Around this time, she entered the Tanka Association Takekashikai hosted by Nobutsuna Sasaki.

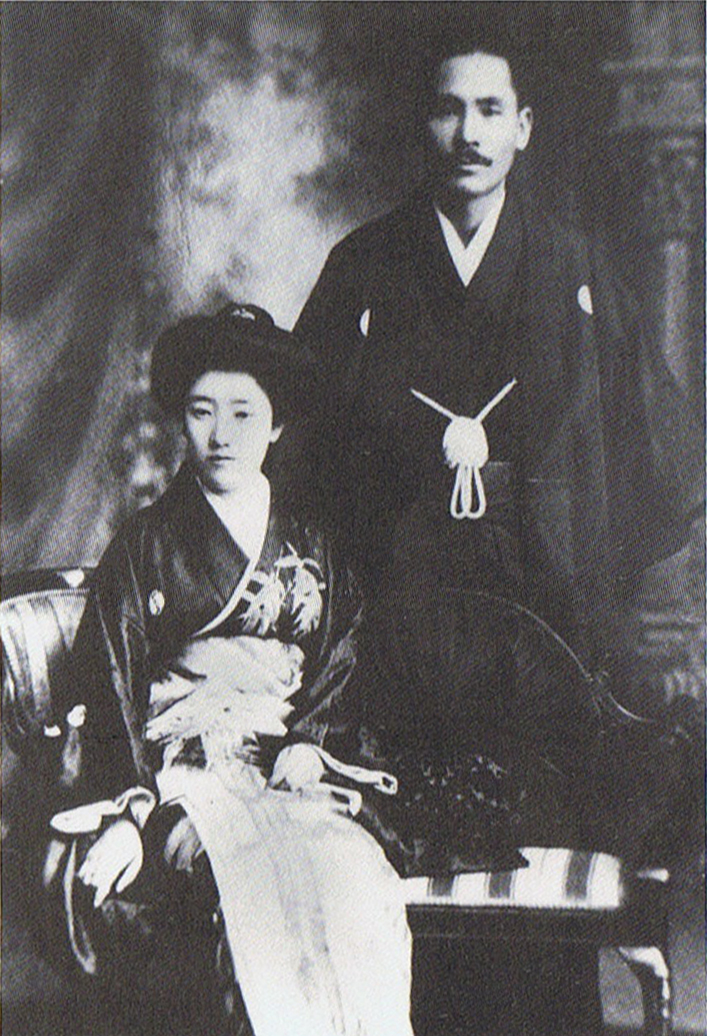
Wedding photo of Byakuren Yanagiwara and Denemon Itō (March 1911)

In 1910, Yanagiwara met Denemon Itō, a coal mine magnate in Kyushu, who was 25 years older than her, and the following year he married her as his second wife, although she gave birth to her eldest son with Denemon, Kaori, in 1910. Their age, status, and education were all vastly different, and their marriage created a public sensation as a political marriage between the family of a count and a coal mine magnate. The scandalous marriage was widely published in the Tokyo Nichi Nichi Shimbun. Hanako was shocked by this news and ended her relationship with Yanagiwara. The same year, Yanagiwara graduated from Tōyō Eiwa Girls' School.

After she remarried, she was called the "Queen of Tsukushi", but did not feel worth living. She wrote a letter to Hanako expressing her feelings, which Hanako accepted, and the two resumed their friendship. She wrote a tanka poem about her loneliness and suffering, and she continued to publish her poems in the Takekashikai magazine Kokoro no Hana. From this time, she began to use her pen name Byakuren.

In 1921, Yanagiwara ran off with socialist Ryūsuke Miyazaki, son of the political activist Tōten Miyazaki. This incident came to be called the "Byakuren Incident". At the time, adultery was a crime under the criminal law, punishable by up to two years of imprisonment. Yanagi announced her Dear John letter to the Itō family on the Osaka Asahi Shimbun, and two days later, a protest statement by Denemon was published on the Osaka Mainichi Shimbun, making it a sensational incident. Her new father-in-law had a large amount of debt, and their life was difficult. When Ryūsuke fell ill from tuberculosis, Yanagiwara supported her new family by writing. In 1925, her eldest daughter, Fuki, was born. From 1935 she presided over the poetry magazine Kototama.

In 1945, Kaori, who was a student soldier, died in an air strike by the US military. From this experience of hers, she launched the "Kokusai Hibo no Kai" (International Society of Sad Mothers) and launched peace-proclaiming activities in various parts of Japan. During and after the Second World War, Yanagiwara became increasingly interested in peace activism and religion.

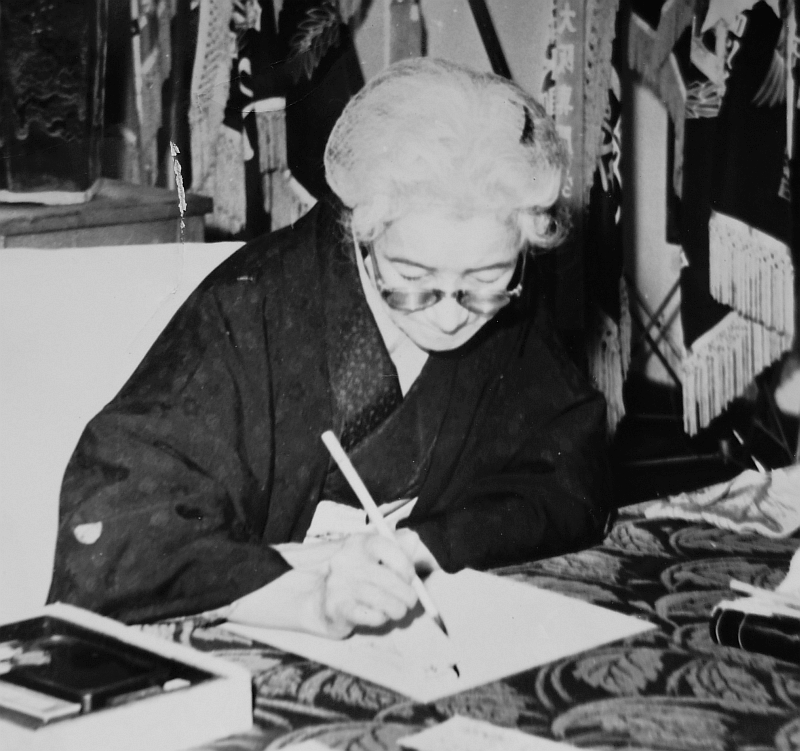
Yanagiwara in her later years

Although she lost her eyesight due to glaucoma, she spent a peaceful life of writing poems until her death. Yanagiwara died in Tokyo on February 22, 1967, at the age of 81.

== Works ==
Yanagiwara's work include waka poetry, novels and poetry collections.

=== Waka collections ===
- Fumi-e (踏絵, 1915)
- Maboroshi no Hana (幻の華, 1919)
- Chiheisen (地平線, 1956)

=== Poetry collections ===
- Kichō no Kage (几帳のかげ)

=== Novels ===
- Ibara no Mi (荊棘の実)

== Gallery ==
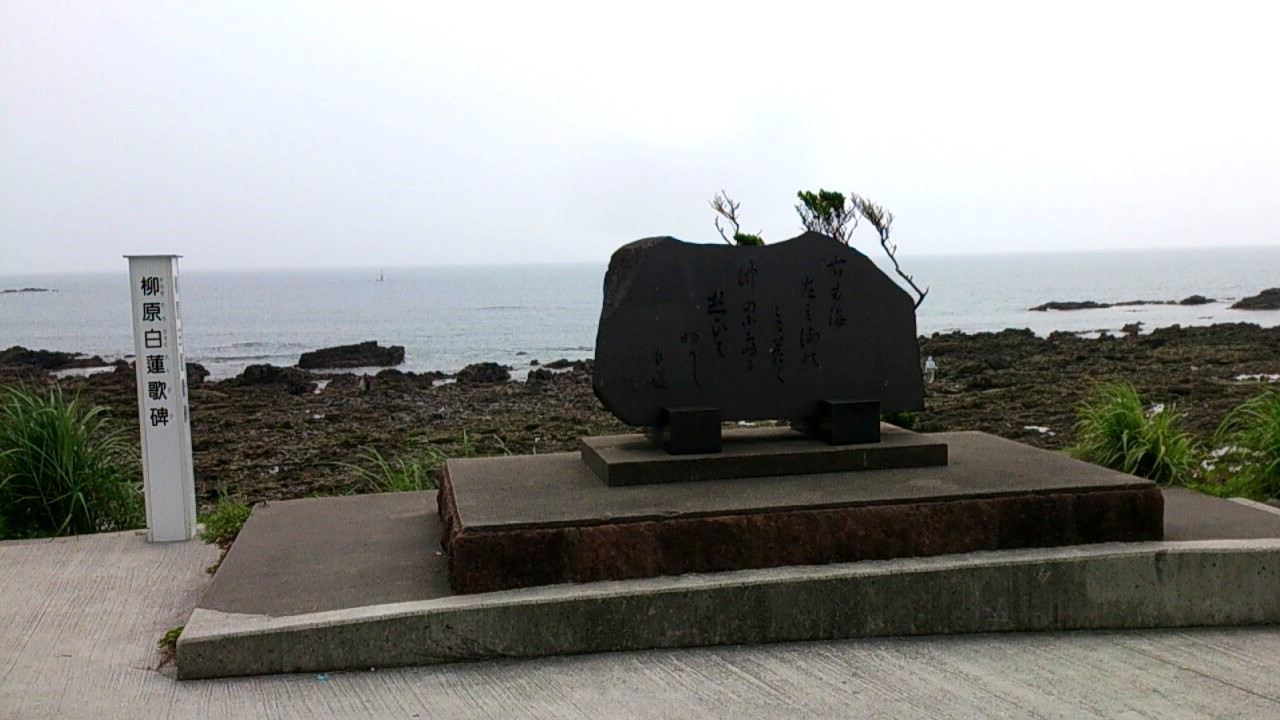
Byakuren Yanagiwara Memorial in Nagasakibana, Ibusuki, Kagoshima Prefecture

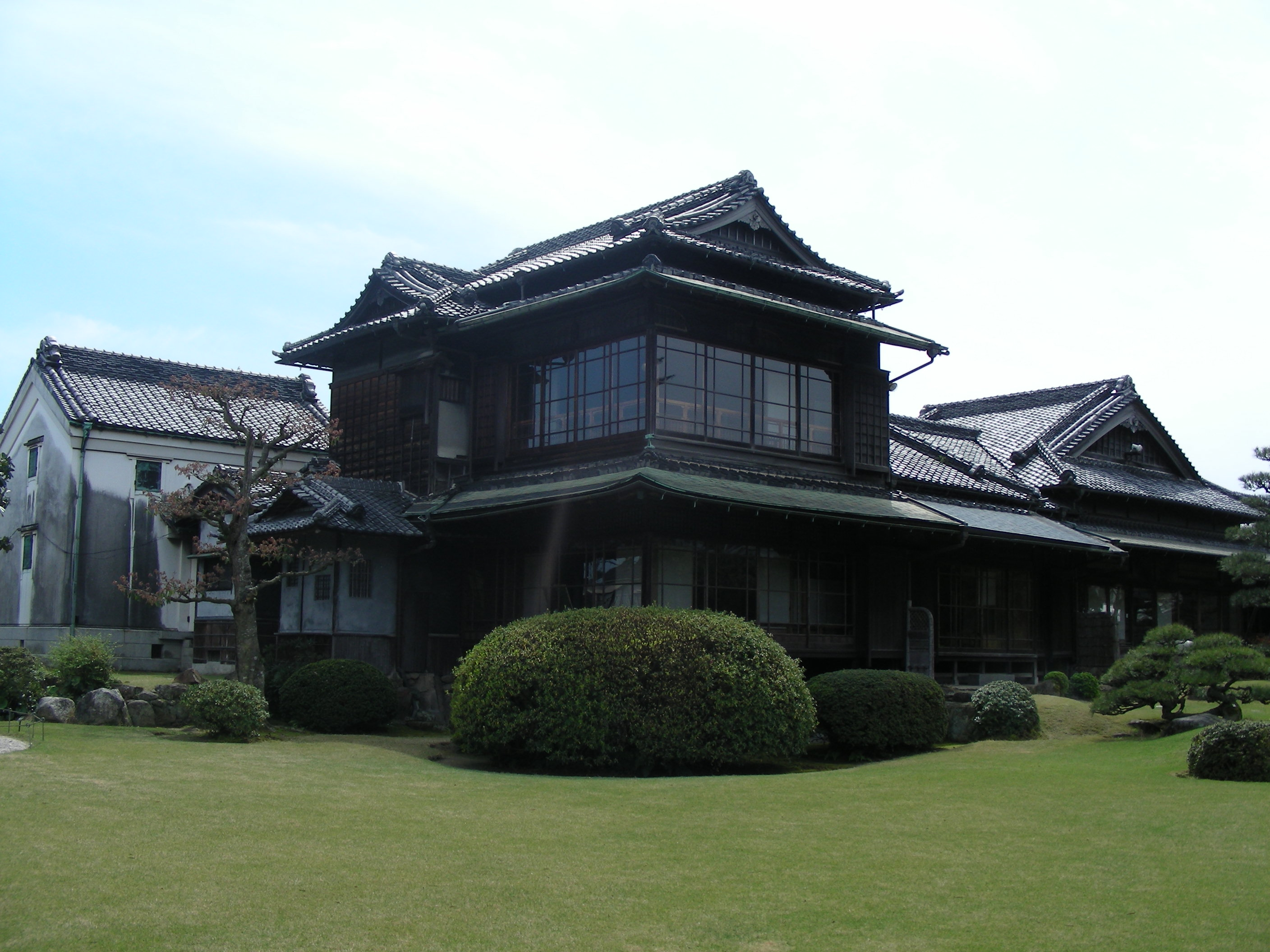
The former Denemon Itō residence
