= Antinomasy =

Antinomasy may refer to:

- Antonomasia, a substitution of any epithet or phrase for a proper name
- Antinomianism, a belief originating in Christian theology that faith alone is necessary for salvation
