= Archetypal name =

Proper name used as a descriptor

An archetypal name is a proper name of a real person or mythological or fictional character that has become a designation for an archetype of a certain personal trait. It is a form of antonomasia.

Archetypal names are a literary device used to allude to certain traits of a character or a plot.

Literary critic Egil Törnqvist mentions possible risks in choosing certain names for literary characters. For example, if a person is named Abraham, it is uncertain whether the reader will be hinted of the biblical figure or Abraham Lincoln, and only the context provides the proper understanding.

== Examples ==
=== Persons ===
- Nanook, a Native Alaskan
- Tex, a cowboy
- Hanako, an archetypal Japanese name for girls.

=== Groups ===
A name may also be an identifier of a social group, an ethnicity, nationality, or geographical locality.

Some of the names below may also be used as ethnic slurs.

- Chad, a young, confident, masculine man that makes a strong positive impression with his assertiveness
- Karen, mainly used in the US for an entitled and demanding white woman
- Paddy, for an Irishman: from Saint Patrick, the patron of Ireland

=== Animals ===
In French, the Latin-derived word for the fox (French: goupil) was replaced by French: renard, from Renart, the fox hero of the Roman de Renart (originally the German Reinhard).

=== Traits ===
==== Real persons ====
- Genius: Einstein
- Polymath: da Vinci
- Womanizer: Casanova
- Traitor: Benedict Arnold, Quisling
- Betrayer: Brutus
- Evil schemer: Machiavelli

==== Fictional or mythological characters ====
- Handsome man: Adonis
- Lover: Romeo
- Manipulator: Svengali
- Betrayer: Judas
- Womanizer: Don Giovanni / Don Juan, Lothario
- Self-centered: Narcissus

== See also ==
- Stock character
- Placeholder name
- Eponym
- Category:National personifications
- List of eponyms
