= Hanako and Anne =

- Promotional poster
- Also known as: Hanako and Anne
- Genre: Drama
- Written by: Miho Nakazono
- Directed by: Tsuyoshi Yanagawa; Zen'nosuke Matsūra
- Starring: Yuriko Yoshitaka; Tsuyoshi Ihara; Shigeru Muroi; Ryōhei Suzuki; Kento Kaku; Haru Kuroki; Tao Tsuchiya; Rin Takanashi; Masataka Kubota; Rie Tomosaka; Miyoko Asada; Renji Ishibashi; Yukie Nakama
- Narrated by: Akihiro Miwa
- Opening theme: "Nijiiro" by Ayaka
- Composer: Yuki Kajiura
- Country of origin: Japan
- Original language: Japanese
- No. of episodes: 156

Production
- Producer: Takeshi Susaki
- Production location: Japan
- Running time: 15 minutes
- Production company: NHK

Original release
- Network: NHK; Channel 3 Family
- Release: March 31 – September 27, 2014

Hanako to Anne (花子とアン, Hanako and Anne) is a Japanese television drama series, the 90th Asadora series broadcast on NHK. It debuted on March 31, 2014, and was broadcast Monday through Saturday mornings, ending on September 27, 2014. It is based on the novel An no Yurikago Muraoka Hanako no Shogai by Eri Muraoka, which is the story of her grandmother Hanako Muraoka (1893–1968, maiden name Annaka), the first to translate Anne of Green Gables into Japanese. The drama describes her trials, tribulations and triumphs at school and some of the lifelong friendships she made there, and her life after graduating and working at a publishing company and as a translator. As a subplot, it also narrates the dramatic life of Muraoka's old friend, Byakuren Yanagiwara, the tanka poet who was a cousin of Emperor Taishō. The series stars Yuriko Yoshitaka as Hanako. Anime composer Yuki Kajiura composed the music for the series. The series was a ratings success.

== Plot ==
The story begins with Hanako and her children narrowly escaping death during the April 1945 bombing of Tokyo, clutching her precious manuscript. The drama then returns to the past to tell the story of roughly the first half of her life. Born Hana Ando to a small and poor farming family in Yamanashi Prefecture's Kōfu city, she was too busy with household chores to go to school until her Christian father, Kippei Ando, a somewhat educated wandering salesman who married the kind but illiterate Fuji, gave her a picture book when she was seven years old. This sparked a girl who already had a powerful imagination and love for stories. Noticing her interest in it, he sent her to a local primary school, where she quickly learned to read and write. Despite family opposition, he arranged for her to enter a Christian school in Tokyo, the Shuwa School for Girls, on a scholarship. Hana does poorly there at first, especially at English, but prompted by the principal, she takes up a passion for the English language. A few years later, nearing graduation, she does a part-time job at a publishing company, where she impresses everyone with translation skills, including Eiji Muraoka, the heir to a printing company, who gives her an English dictionary. At school, she decides to become friends with Renko Hayama, a difficult woman, much older than the rest, who had been sent to the school by her aristocratic family after dissatisfying the family of her first husband. During the school production of Romeo and Juliet, starring Renko as Juliet and Hana's friend Ayako Daigo as Romeo, and translated by Hana, Renko finally opens up to Hana and the two become “bosom friends.” Hana, however, is furious when Renko suddenly leaves the school without telling her to marry Densuke Kano, a coal-mining baron from Fukuoka Kyushu, not knowing Renko's family had again forced her into a political marriage. Hana continues on to the upper school, and it is at that time she encounters Kayo, her younger sister who had been contracted to a sewing mill, but had fled the miserable conditions. She helps her get back on her feet, but with little employment for an intelligent, independent woman, Hana leaves Kayo in Tokyo upon graduation and returns to Kōfu to become a teacher at her old primary school.

Hana is at first not a very good teacher, but slowly learns the ropes, especially with the help of Asaichi, her childhood friend who is now also a teacher at the school and is secretly in love with Hana. But there is strife in Hana's family. Her brother Kitchitaro, who himself had fallen in love with Renko when she once visited Kōfu, rebels against his father and decides to leave town and join the Kempeitai, Japan's formidable military police force. Hana's younger sister Momo also leaves to marry a man in Hokkaido when, even after falling in love with Asaichi, she decides to let him pursue his love for Hana. Asaichi, however, never ends up confessing his love. Instead, Hana grows further away from him as she begins publishing her stories and even wins a prize from a Tokyo publisher. Encouraged by the publisher and her friends, including Asaichi, she quits her teaching position to return to Tokyo to work at the publisher, where Ayako also is employed. There she sees that Kayo has become a waitress at a fancy Western-style cafe.

Hana also struggles at the publisher, dealing with deadlines and difficult authors. She participates in the publisher's new children's magazine by translating Mark Twain's The Prince and the Pauper, a book suggested to her by Eiji's younger brother Ikuya. Renko also writes to Hana for the first time since they parted at school, having seen Hana's publications, and having published her own book of poetry. She visits Tokyo and encourages Hana to pursue her love for Eiji, even as she, feeling trapped in a marriage with a kind but uncultured man, begins an affair with Ryūichi Miyamoto, a law student involved in left-wing theater who happens to be watched by Kichitaro and the Kempeitai. Hana, however, is shocked to learn that Eiji, despite once hugging her in a fit of emotion, is married to a sick but beautiful woman, Kasumi. Kasumi, however, eventually divorces Eiji, discerning from the illustrations he drew for Hana's translations his love for Hana, and dies soon after. It is Asaichi, however, that eventually pushes Eiji to marry Hana. Soon, the two have a son, Ayumu. Renko then starts a national scandal by running away with Ryūichi. When she is pregnant, her family finds and takes her away, but just then, the Great Kantō earthquake takes place. Hana, Eiji, and Ayumu are safe, and Renko is able to flee her family, but Ikuya dies just after proposing marriage to Kayo in the cafe.

In the years after the quake, Hana and the others slowly rebuild their lives. With help from Kano, Eiji is able to restart the printing company and publish The Prince and the Pauper in book form. Kayo starts her own cafe, and Renko and Ayako become advocates for oppressed women. Hana, however, is devastated when Ayumu dies of dysentery. She only recovers when she realizes the importance of her telling stories to the children of Japan. That she begins to do on the radio, in addition to print. In the meantime, Kichitaro announces his hope to marry Ayako, but Kempeitai officials prevent him from doing that. Momo suddenly appears in Tokyo, having fled Hokkaido after her husband died and she was mistreated by his family. In a family meeting, she confesses her resentment at the fact that Hana has seemingly received the best in life, a resentment Kichitaro could share. Sympathizing with her, a struggling artist named Akira proposes marriage to Momo.

The two marry and have one daughter, Misato, who Hanako and Eiji end up adopting when Akira comes down with tuberculosis, and another, Naoko. Japan, however, is headed towards war. Miyamoto is arrested for trying to stop the hostilities, and Hanako and Renko part ways when Hanako fails to sufficiently oppose the war. On the radio, Hanako must increasingly tell glorious stories of soldiers on the front. Just before the Attack on Pearl Harbor, Miss Scott, her teacher from Shuwa, gives her Anne of Green Gables in hopes Hanako would eventually translate it. When the Pacific War begins, Hanako quits her radio job as she senses it is no longer about giving children dreams. She and Eiji soon suffer for their connection to enemy literature and language. Miyamoto, released from prison, soon leaves Renko to seek out other means to bring peace. Eventually, the bombing reaches Tokyo and Hanako, who decides translating Anne of Green Gables is one way of dealing with this war, barely escapes with her family and manuscript when an air raid nearly destroys their neighborhood.

The war ends, but scars remain. Kayo had lost her café. Renko had lost her beloved son Junpei in the last days of the conflict, and blames Hanako for urging children on the radio to fight for the nation. This shocks Hanako, who then initially refuses a request to return to the radio. She had begun translating again, but no one wants to publish Anne of Green Gables. With the defeat, Kichitaro becomes an empty shell, feeling that everything he had worked for had come to naught. In Kōfu, however, Hanako and Kichitarō learn from Kippei the need to be proud of their efforts and the importance of making up for what they had done. Kichitaro decides to take over the farm and Ayako arrives to declare her intention to stay with Kichitaro. Knowing her father wants to hear her again on air, Hanako resumes her radio show, and Kippei dies happily while hearing his daughter's voice over the broadcast.

Hanako and Renko eventually mend their friendship, especially since Hanako can understand what it feels like to lose a son. At her request, Renko goes on the radio to urge mothers never to let their sons go to war again. Then, seven years after the end of the war, Hanako is finally able to publish Anne of Green Gables to great acclaim.

== Production ==
The names of some people and places in the drama differ from historical fact. The plot is based on the biography by Muraoka's granddaughter, Eri Muraoka, which was made into a screenplay by the Japanese screenwriter Miho Nakazono. The screenplay departs from historical fact in order to show similarities and parallels between the heroine Hana and Anne of Anne of Green Gables, and to show scenes reminiscent of the novel. The drama is more fiction, than strictly biographical.

== Cast ==
- Yuriko Yoshitaka as Hana Ando, later Hanako Muraoka
- Tsuyoshi Ihara as Kippei Ando, her father
- Shigeru Muroi as Fuji Ando, her mother
- Renji Ishibashi as Shuzo Ando, her grandfather
- Yukie Nakama as Renko Hayama, Hanako's best friend
- Kisuke Iida as Akitaka Hayama, Renko's brother
- Ryōhei Suzuki as Eiji Muraoka, Hanako's husband
- Takeo Nakahara as Heisuke Muraoka, Eiji's father
- Keita Machida as Ikuya Muraoka, Eiji's brother
- Takahiro Fujimoto as Soichiro Kajiwara, a publisher
- Masataka Kubota as Asaichi Kiba, Hanako's childhood friend
- Akiko Matsumoto as Rin Kiba, Asaichi's mother
- Kento Kaku as Kichitaro Ando, Hanako's older brother
- Haru Kuroki as Kayo Ando, Hanako's younger sister
- Tao Tsuchiya as Momo Ando, Hanako's youngest sister
- Rin Takanashi as Ayako Daigo, Hana's friend from school
- Kōtarō Yoshida as Densuke Kano, a coal-mining baron
- Ayumu Nakajima as Ryuichi Miyamoto, a law student
- Cunning Takeyama as Jinnosuke Tokumaru, the local landowner
- Yūma Yamoto as Takeshi Tokumaru, his son
- Miyoko Asada as Noriko Mogi, a teacher at Hana's school
- Rie Tomosaka as Taki Toyama, an English teacher at Hana's school
- Tordy Clark as Miss Blackburn, the principal at Hana's school
- Hannah Grace as Miss Scott, a teacher
- Mariko Tsutsui as Tami Yamamoto
- Makita Sports as Shōhei Honda, Hana's primary school teacher
- Haruna Kondō as Kaoruko Shiratori, an upper class student at Shūwa
- Maho Yamada as Mitsuyo Udagawa, a popular author

== Reception ==
Hanako to Anne was a ratings success, garnering an average rating of 22.6% over its 156 episodes, the highest for an Asadora in ten years.

Preceded by Gochisōsan	Asadora; March 31, 2014 – September 27, 2014	Succeeded by Massan
