= Kyu Sakamoto Memorial Hall =

Kyu Sakamoto Memorial Hall (坂本九思い出記念館) is a museum in Kuriyama, Hokkaido. Built in 1993, it relies entirely on visitor donations for its operation. Admission is free. The 220 m^{2} wooden building features a nine-sided pavilion and an overall layout shaped like the number 9. The hall houses an extensive collection of records, clothes, pictures, films, and information about the late singer Kyu Sakamoto.

== See also ==
- Japanese museums
