= Kyu Sakamoto =

Japanese singer and actor (1941–1985)

- 坂本 九
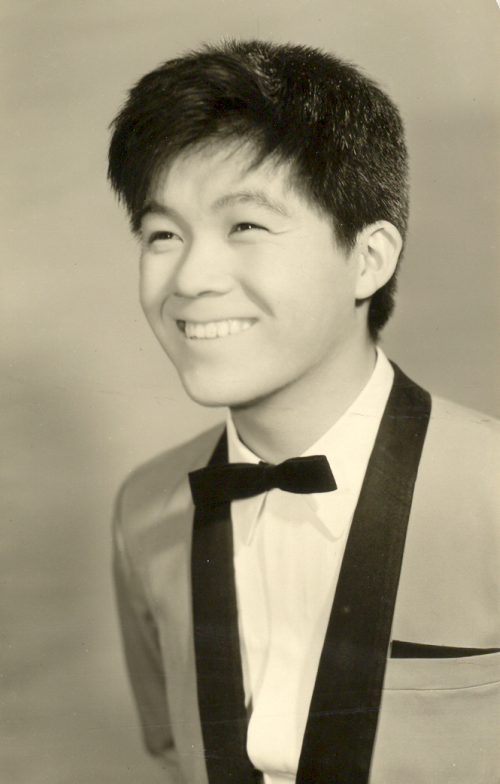
- Sakamoto in 1961/1962
- Born: Hisashi Sakamoto; 10 December 1941; Kawasaki, Kanagawa, Empire of Japan
- Died: 12 August 1985 (aged 43); Mount Takamagahara, Ueno, Gunma, Japan
- Other names: Kyū-chan; Hisashi Ōshima
- Occupations: Singer; actor
- Spouse: Yukiko Kashiwagi (m. 1971)
- Children: 2, including Hanako
- Musical career
- Genres: J-pop; pop; kayōkyoku
- Instrument: Vocals
- Years active: 1958–1985
- Labels: Toshiba-EMI; Capitol (U.S. and Canada); His Master's Voice (UK)
- Website: www.sakamoto-kyu.com

Hisashi "Kyu" Sakamoto (Japanese: 坂本 九, Hepburn: Sakamoto Hisashi or Sakamoto Kyū; 10 December 1941 – 12 August 1985), legally registered as Hisashi Ōshima (大島 九, Ōshima Hisashi) since 1956, was a Japanese singer and actor.

He was best known outside Japan for his international hit song "Ue o Muite Arukō" (known as "Sukiyaki" in English-speaking markets), which was sung in Japanese and sold over 13 million copies. It reached number one in the United States Billboard Hot 100 in June 1963, making Sakamoto the first Asian recording artist to have a number one song on the chart. He was also the first Japanese artist to have a number one single on the Australian singles chart.

Sakamoto died on 12 August 1985 in the crash of Japan Air Lines Flight 123.

== Life and career ==
=== Early years: 1941–1949 ===
==== Childhood in Kawasaki and Kasama ====
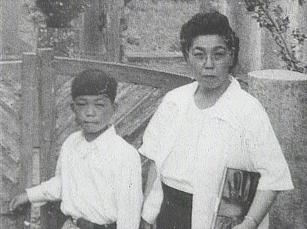
Kyu Sakamoto with his mother, Iku, in 1951

Sakamoto was born on 10 December 1941, in Kawasaki, Kanagawa Prefecture, to Hiroshi Sakamoto, a cargo tender officer, and his second wife, Iku. The youngest of his father's nine children, he was nicknamed Kyū-chan (九ちゃん), meaning "Li'l Nine", with Kyū also being an alternative reading of the kanji of his given name, Hisashi (九).

In the summer of 1944, during the air raids over the greater Tokyo area, Kyu's mother took her three children to live with their maternal grandparents in rural Kasama, Ibaraki Prefecture. They moved back to Kawasaki in 1949. Their father's company had been closed by the American occupation forces and he opened a restaurant.

=== 1956–1958 ===
==== Teenage life ====
In 1956, Kyu's parents divorced. His mother was given custody over her three minor children including Kyu, and they adopted the mother's maiden name, Ōshima. His older half-siblings kept their father's surname, Sakamoto. Kyu started playing guitar in high school, but he soon after began singing.

=== First recordings (1959–1960) ===
==== JVC and Toshiba Records ====
In May 1958, when Sakamoto was 16 years old, he joined the Japanese pop-band The Drifters that had been formed three years earlier. Sakamoto was unhappy about his position in the band as second vocalist, and this often led to fights with the other members. His big breakthrough as a band member came 26 August 1958, when he sang at the annual music festival Western Carnival at the Nichigeki Hall. After a quarrel that ended in a fight with two of the other members, Sakamoto left the band in November 1958.

For a short period of time, Sakamoto returned to his studies and focused on entering university. By December 1958, he joined his classmate's Hisahiko Iida's band called Danny Iida and Paradise King. He replaced Hiroshi Mizuhara as singer. Sakamoto's career began to rise to expectations, where he ended his studies and left school. In June 1959, the band got a record deal at the JVC record company. The Paradise King and Sakamoto released their song "Kanashiki Rokujissai" in August 1960, which became a great hit. In the time after they released a number of songs that became very popular. This led to Sakamoto obtaining a record deal at the Toshiba Records company and left the Paradise King aiming at a solo career.

=== Solo career (1961–1985) ===
==== Debut album and international success (1961–1964) ====
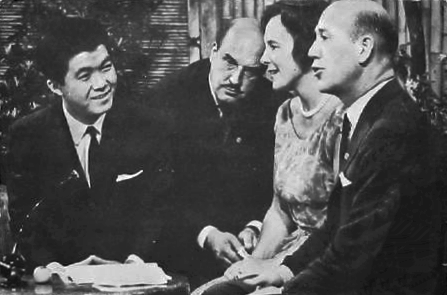
Sakamoto (far left) being interviewed live on the Swedish talk show Hylands hörna during the Summer Olympics in October 1964

Sakamoto's solo career was inaugurated with the song "Ue o Muite Arukō" written by Rokusuke Ei and Hachidai Nakamura. The song was first heard on the NHK entertainment program Yume de Aimashō on 16 August 1961. It became a smash hit and was released on red vinyl on 15 October. It remained the highest selling record until January 1962, three months after its release.

His international breakthrough came in 1963 during a visit to Japan by Louis Benjamin, an executive of British record company Pye Records. Hearing the song several times, Benjamin decided to bring it back to England. Due to concerns that the title would be too hard for English-speakers to pronounce or remember, the song was renamed "Sukiyaki", after the Japanese cooked beef dish familiar to the English. The new title was intended to sound both catchy and distinctive in Japanese, but other than the language, it had no actual connection to the song.

Initially, Pye Records released an instrumental version of the song recorded by Kenny Ball and His Jazzmen. After that became a hit in England, His Master's Voice released the original, which also sold well, reaching sixth place in the label's most sold records. In 1963, Capitol Records released the song in the US with the alternate title, eventually selling over one million copies, and remaining number one on the Billboard Hot 100 number one single for three weeks in June 1963.

After the international success of "Ue o Muite Arukō", Sakamoto went on a world tour that lasted from summer of 1963 to the beginning of 1964. Among the countries he visited were the United States (including Hawaii), Germany, and Sweden. During his time in the U.S., he was invited to appear in several television shows. On 13 August 1963, he landed at Los Angeles International Airport and that evening, was a guest of television program The Steve Allen Show. Sakamoto was also expected to appear on The Ed Sullivan Show, but his appearance was canceled owing to a scheduling conflict with the production of his upcoming movie, Kyu-chan Katana o Nuite.

Sakamoto had only one other song reach the U.S. charts, "China Nights (Shina no Yoru)" (Capitol 5016), which peaked at number 58 in 1963. His only American album, Sukiyaki and Other Japanese Hits (Capitol 10349), peaked at number 14 on the Billboard Pop Albums chart (now known as the Billboard 200) in 1963 and remained on the Pop Albums chart for 17 weeks.

He received his sole foreign Gold Record of the Recording Industry Association of America (RIAA) by Capitol Records on 15 May 1964 in Hotel Okura, Tokyo.

==== Later appearances ====
During the 1964 Summer Olympics, he was featured on the Swedish TV-program Hylands hörna broadcast live from Tokyo.

In 1968, Sakamoto and Hachidai Nakamura participated in the Festival Internacional da Canção in Rio de Janeiro with the song "Sayonara, Sayonara" and finished in 7th place.

=== Marriage and family ===
In 1971, Sakamoto married Japanese actress Yukiko Kashiwagi. The couple had two daughters, Hanako and Maiko.

=== Death ===
On 12 August 1985, Sakamoto was aboard Japan Air Lines Flight 123 (departing from Tokyo), heading to Osaka for an event. The plane suffered a severe structural failure and decompression before crashing into two ridges of Mount Takamagahara in Ueno, Gunma, a disaster that remains the deadliest single-aircraft accident in history with 520 people killed, including Sakamoto. He was interred at Chōkoku-ji Temple in the central Minato-ku area in Tokyo.

== Legacy ==
His most popular song, "Ue o Muite Arukō" ("I look up when I walk") is the only Japanese song to reach number one on the Billboard pop charts in the United States, a position it maintained for three weeks in 1963. It was also the first-ever Japanese language song to enter the Australian charts, where it reached number 2. In addition, it made the UK charts, though it only climbed to number 6 with no further chart entries.

"Ue o Muite Arukō" has been covered multiple times over the years, beginning with the instrumental by Kenny Ball and his Jazzmen. "Ue o Muite Arukō" was also covered as an instrumental, by English pianist Johnny Pearson, during 1982. Well-known English-language cover versions include a 1981 cover by A Taste of Honey and a 1995 cover by 4 P.M., both of which made the top ten of the Billboard Hot 100. In 1989, the self-titled album Selena contained a Spanish translation of the Taste of Honey cover, which was released as a single in 1990. The English lyrics have also appeared in whole or in part in songs by performers including Slick Rick and Doug E. Fresh (1985's "La Di Da Di"), Salt-N-Pepa (1985's "The Show Stopper"), Snoop Dogg (1993's "Lodi Dodi", a "La Di Da Di" cover), Bone Thugs-n-Harmony (1995's Bless Da 40 Oz), Raphael Saadiq (1995's "Ask of You", another to make the Hot 100), Mary J. Blige (1997's "Everything") and Will Smith (1999's "So Fresh", featuring Slick Rick).

An American version by Jewel Akens with different English lyrics was written for it. Titled "My First Lonely Night (Sukiyaki)" in 1966, the song reached number 82 on the Billboard Hot 100.

On 16 March 1999, Japan Post issued a stamp commemorating Sakamoto and "Ue o Muite Arukō".

On 15 October 2020, Google celebrated his song "Ue o Muite Aruko" and Sakamoto with a Google Doodle.

The song also played during the closing ceremony of the 2020 Tokyo Olympics.

== Discography ==
=== Albums ===
- Sukiyaki and Other Japanese Hits (1963)
- Very Best of Kyu Sakamoto (1994)
- Kyu Sakamoto Memorial Best (2005)
- Kyu Sakamoto CD & DVD The Best (2005)

=== Singles ===
Year	Title	Peak chart positions					Record Label	B-side	Album
Year	Title	US Pop	US AC	US R&B	CAN	UK	Record Label	B-side	Album
1963	"Sukiyaki"	1	1	18	4	6	Capitol	"Anoko No Namaewa Nantenkana"	Sukiyaki and Other Japanese Hits
1963	"China Nights (Shina No Yoru)"	58	19	—	—	—	Capitol	"Tsun Tsun Bushi (The Tsun Tsun Song)"	
1963	"Miagete Goran Yoru no Hoshi o"	—	—	—	—	—	Capitol	"Benkyo No Cha Cha Cha"	
1964	"The Olympics Song"	—	—	—	—	—	Capitol	"Tankobushi"	
1964	"Sayonara Tokyo"	—	—	—	—	—	Capitol	"I Like You (Kimiga Suki)"	
1986	"Miagete Goran Yoru no Hoshi o" (re-release)	—	—	—	—	—	Capitol	"Benkyo No Cha Cha Cha"	
1986	"Sayonara Tokyo" (re-release)	—	—	—	—	—	Capitol	"I Like You (Kimiga Suki)"	

== Filmography ==
- Takekurabe (1955)
- Everything Goes Wrong (1960)
- Kigeki: ekimae danchi (1961)
- Ue o Muite Arukō (1962)
- Shichiji ni aimashō (1963)
- Clap your hands when you are happy (1964)
- Gulliver's Travels Beyond the Moon (1965)
- Kyūchan's Big Dream (1967)
- Tokkan (1975)

== Biography ==
- Ue o Muite Arukō: Sakamoto Kyu Monogatari (made-for-TV movie, TV Tokyo, 2005)

== In popular culture ==
- Japanese actor Junichi Kajioka portrayed Kyu Sakamoto in the American TV series Seconds from Disaster Season 6: Episode 6 (2012) called "Terrified Over Tokyo" and Season 7: Episode 2 (2018) called "Deadly Design".
- 2026 Japanese musical film Sukiyaki directed by Zeze Takahisa, telling the story behind the pop song "Sukiyaki," sung by crooner Kyu Sakamoto, was set as opening film of 39th Tokyo International Film Festival screened on October 26, 2026.

== See also ==
- 6980 Kyusakamoto, an outer main-belt asteroid, named in his honor
- Kyū Sakamoto Memorial Hall
