= Yanagiwara Sukeakira =

Japanese nobleman (1297–1353)

Yanagiwara Sukeakira 柳原資明

Gon-Dainagon
- In office 1337–1346
- Monarch: Emperor Kōgon

Personal details
- Born: Hino Sukeakira; 1297
- Died: 1353 (aged 55–56)
- Occupation: kugyō
- Known for: Establishing the Yanagiwara family

Yanagiwara Sukeakira (柳原 資明, 1297－1353) was a Japanese nobleman (kugyō) of the late Kamakura and early Nanboku-chō period. He is the founder of the Yanagiwara family.

== Life ==
Hino Sukeakira was born as the fourth son of Gon-Dainagon Hino Toshimitsu.

When the shogun Ashikaga Takauji rebelled against the Kenmu Restoration, he supported Emperor Go-Daigo of the Southern Court. His elder brother Hino Suketomo was one of the masterminds of Emperor Go-Daigo's plan to overthrow the Ashikaga shogunate.

However, with his eldest brother Hino Sukena being a favorite of Emperor Kōgon of the Northern Court, Sukeakira began his service to the Northern Court. When the Ashikaga shogunate fought against the Kenmu Restoration to support the Northern Court, Sukeakira protected Emperor Kōgon as one of the emperor's close associates. He became a senior statesman for the Northern Court building up his power rising to the court rank of Senior Second Rank and to the position of Gon-Dainagon.

He later moved to live at the Yanagiwara Mansion, from which he took the name Yanagiwara from, and established the Yanagiwara family.

Sukeakira died in 1353 (2nd year of Bunna, 7th month, 27th day) at the age of 57.

== Genealogy ==
The Hino family descended from the Fujiwara clan's Hokke house through Fujiwara no Manatsu, the elder brother of Fujiwara no Fuyutsugu.

The descendants of Sukeakira are of the Yanagiwara family, who made writing the family business. Members of the family excelled in kidendō (the academic study of poetry) and were appointed bunshō-hakase (kidendō teachers). After the Meiji Restoration, the family was appointed to the kazoku (hereditary peerage) with the title of Count.

== Family ==
- Father: Hino Toshimitsu
- Mother: Sanmi-no-Tsubone (Emperor Kameyama's court lady)
- Wife: Minamoto no Yasuyo's daughter
- Unknown mother:
  - Son: Yanagiwara Munemitsu
  - Son: Mushanokōji Takamitsu (founder of the Mushanokōji family)
  - Son: Tsuchimikado Yasumitsu (founder of the Tsuchimikado family)
  - Son: Yanagiwara Tadamitsu (1334–1379, 2nd head of the Yanagiwara family)
  - Son: Kōsai
