= Loretta Leonard Shaw =

Canadian missionary

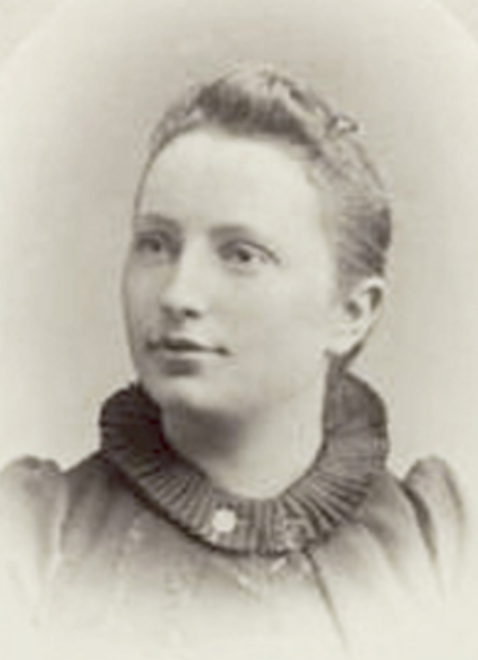
- Loretta Leonard Shaw, from an 1892 yearbook.
- Born: 19 July 1872; Saint John, New Brunswick
- Died: 29 July 1940; Saint John, New Brunswick
- Occupation(s): Educator, missionary
- Years active: 1895-1940
- Known for: Taught in Osaka, Japan, for over thirty years

Loretta Leonard Shaw (19 July 1872 – 29 July 1940) was a Canadian Christian missionary in Japan from 1905 to 1939.

== Early life ==
Loretta Leonard Shaw was born in Saint John, New Brunswick, one of the eight children of Arthur Neville Shaw and Margaret Elizabeth Hilyard Shaw. Her father was a carriage manufacturer. She studied modern languages and graduated from the University of New Brunswick in Fredericton in 1894. She trained as a teacher in Cambridge, Massachusetts.

== Career ==
Shaw taught school in the Boston area for a few years after earning her teaching credentials. In 1904, she was accepted as a missionary by Church Missionary Society of the Church of England in Canada, and became a teacher at the Bishop Poole Girls' School in Osaka, Japan, where she taught from 1905 to 1919, and from 1923 to 1932. She wrote about her work for Canadian church publications, and in a book, Japan in Transition (1922). She was a delegate to the World's Sunday School Convention in Oslo in 1936. She toured in Canada during furlough leaves, speaking on Japan.

Shaw donated hundreds of Japanese objects, including clothing, coins, dolls, toys, and photographs, for display in Canada, and many are now in the collection of the New Brunswick Museum. In 1932, she left teaching to work at the Christian Literature Society of Japan, overseeing the publication of books for women and children. In that work, she is credited with bringing Anne of Green Gables to the attention of translator Hanako Muraoka, whose translation Akage no An (1952) became a favorite of Japanese readers for generations.

== Personal life ==
Shaw returned to Canada in 1939, and she died from cancer in 1940, at her sister's home in Saint John, ten days after her 68th birthday. "She was always keen to strengthen what was weak, right what was wrong," recalled a colleague in 1941. "She was an ideal friend, faithful, true, and understanding, with strong and deep affection."
