= Yanagiwara Sakimitsu =

19th Century Japanese diplomat

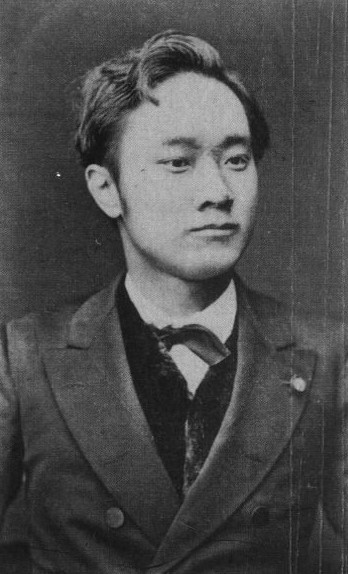
Yanagiwara Sakimitsu

Count Yanagiwara Sakimitsu (柳原前光; 4 May 1850 – 2 September 1894) was a Japanese statesman and diplomat. He is the father of the poet and novelist Byakuren Yanagiwara.

== Family ==
He was born in Kyoto to the prominent Yanagiwara family. His sister was Yanagihara Naruko, a concubine of the Emperor Meiji and the mother of Emperor Taishō.

== Career ==
Upon Meiji Restoration, Yanagiwara entered the Ministry of Foreign Affairs. In 1872, he arrived in Tianjin on a mission of looking into the probability of a treaty between China and Japan. From 1874, he served as Minister Plenipotentiary to China.
