= Monta Mino =

Japanese television presenter (1944–2025)

- みの もんた
- Born: Norio Minorikawa; 22 August 1944; Tokyo, Empire of Japan
- Died: 1 March 2025 (aged 80); Tokyo, Japan
- Education: Rikkyo University
- Occupation: TV presenter
- Years active: 1967–2020
- Spouse: Yasuko Minorikawa (m. 1970; died 2012)
- Children: 3

Monta Mino (みの もんた, Mino Monta), born Norio Minorikawa (御法川 法男, Minorikawa Norio; 22 August 1944 – 1 March 2025), was a Japanese television presenter.

Mino was recognized by the Guinness World Records as being the TV host with the most hours of live TV appearances in a week (22 hours, 15 seconds), as of April 2008. This breaks his earlier 2006 record of 21 hours, 42 minutes.

== Career ==
Mino was from Setagaya in Tokyo. He graduated from Rikkyo High School and Rikkyo University. After a short stint in the conservative newspaper Sankei Shimbun, he was transferred to sister company Nippon Cultural Broadcasting in 1967, where he worked as a radio announcer reading the news, covering baseball games, and hosting the late-night program Sei! Young. The name Mino Monta originated in the opening to another NCB program he hosted, "All Japan Pop 20". He left NCB in 1979 to work at his father's company in Aichi Prefecture, but continued to read the news as a contractor for Aichi Broadcasting.

He presented the morning news show Mino Monta no Asa Zuba! (みのもんたの朝ズバッ!), Quiz $ Millionaire (the Japanese version of the British quiz show Who Wants to Be a Millionaire?), and the Sunday evening Amazing Animals (どうぶつ奇想天外, Dōbutsukisōtengai), among other programmes. Mino also hosted the long-running afternoon television programme Omoikkiri TV (おもいっきりテレビ) in which he dispensed lifestyle and health advice; it was discontinued in 2007.

He claimed he only needed four hours of sleep every night because of hosting eleven TV programmes, including news shows, talk shows, wildlife shows and quiz shows, and appearing on television every day of the week except Sunday.

== Personal life and death ==
Mino's wife, Yasuko Minorikawa (御法川 靖子, Minorikawa Yasuko) died on 22 May 2012 of cancer, aged 65. They had been married since November 1970.

Mino was diagnosed with Parkinson's disease in 2020 and refrained from appearing on television.

On 16 January 2025, Mino choked at a restaurant in Minato, Tokyo, and was sent to a hospital for treatment. He died in the early hours of 1 March 2025 at the age of 80.

== Controversies ==
In September 2013, Mino took a break from television news duties following the arrest on 13 September of his 31-year-old son, Yuto Minorikawa (御法川 雄斗), who was charged with stealing a man's bag on the street in Tokyo.
