= Martha Cartmell =

Canadian missionary and educator (1845–1945)

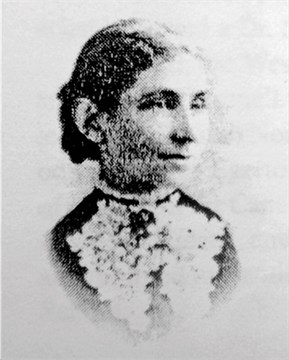
Martha Cartmell

Martha Julia Cartmell (December 14, 1845 – March 20, 1945) was a Canadian Methodist/United Church missionary and educator in Japan. She founded the Toyo Eiwa Jogakuin school in 1884 which now includes Toyo Eiwa University.

== Life ==
The daughter of James Cartmell, a stone cutter, and his wife Sarah, she was born in Thorold and was educated in Hamilton and Toronto. Her mother died when she was five. Cartmell became a missionary and left San Francisco for Japan in 1882 and established a Christian school for girls, Toyo Eiwa Jogakuin, two years later in Roppongi.

Cartmell was forced to resign due to poor health in 1887. She recovered in Canada, working at the General Mission in Victoria, British Columbia from 1890 to 1892, and returned to Tokyo. After four more years in Japan, she again returned to Canada in 1896 and worked with Japanese people at the General Mission in Victoria for two more years before retiring for good in 1898.

The school grew to also include Toyo Eiwa University. In 2013, the alumni association for the Toyo Eiwa school donated cherry trees in her honour to Hamilton and to Thorold.
