= Hanako Honda =

Japanese politician (1909–1968)

- 本多 花子

Member of the House of Representatives
- In office 10 April 1946 – 31 March 1947
- Preceded by: Constituency established
- Succeeded by: Constituency abolished
- Constituency: Osaka 2nd

Personal details
- Born: 16 January 1909 Kobe, Hyōgo, Japan
- Died: 31 January 1968 (aged 59)
- Party: Liberal

Hanako Honda (Japanese: 本多花子, January 1909 – 31 January 1968) was a Japanese politician. She was one of the first group of women elected to the House of Representatives in 1946.

== Biography ==
Honda was born in Kobe in 1909 and graduated from Mizuki Higher Elementary School. In 1946, she contested the Osaka 2nd district in the general elections as a candidate of the Japan Women's Party, and was elected to the House of Representatives. After being elected, she joined the Japan Liberal Party. During her time in parliament, she introduced a members' bill for the enlargement of medical facilities for public school children and others. She contested Osaka's fifth district in the 1947 elections as a Liberal Party candidate, but lost her seat. She died in 1968.
