= Katayama Hiroko =

Japanese poet and translator

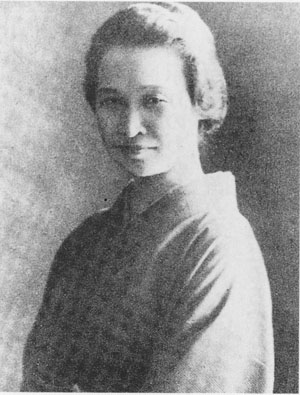
Hiroko Katayama

Katayama Hiroko (片山広子 born 10 February 1878 in Tokyo, died 19 March 1957) was a Japanese poet and translator. She did many translations of Irish writers under the pseudonym Matsumura Mineko. Her husband was a noted bureaucrat. She reportedly took her pseudonym from a name she saw on a child's umbrella. She maintained a friendship with Ryūnosuke Akutagawa and he reportedly said of her "Finally I have met a woman who can be called my equal in the arena of words." She also acted as a mentor to Muraoka Hanako who is known in Japan for translating Anne of Green Gables.
