= Makoto Satō (director) =

Japanese documentary film director (1957–2007)

- 佐藤 真
- Born: September 12, 1957; Hirosaki, Aomori Prefecture, Japan
- Died: September 4, 2007 (aged 49)
- Occupation: Film director

Makoto Satō (佐藤 真 Satō Makoto, September 12, 1957 – September 4, 2007) was a Japanese documentary film director. Among his best-known films were Living On the River Agano, which describes people around the Agano River where incidents of Niigata Minamata disease were discovered, and Self and Others.

His final film, Out of Place: Memories of Edward Said (2005), was named Best Documentary at the 2006 Mainichi Film Awards.

== Early life ==
Satō was born in Hirosaki, Aomori Prefecture, and raised in Tokyo.

== Filmography ==
- A Y.M.O. Film: Propaganda (1984, YMO PROPAGANDA)
- Living on the River Agano (1992, 阿賀に生きる)
- Artists in Wonderland (1998, まひるのほし)
- Self and Others (2000, SELF AND OTHERS)
- Hanako (2001, 花子)
- Memories of Agano (2004, 阿賀の記憶)
- Out of Place: Memories of Edward Said (2005, エドワード・サイード OUT OF PLACE)
