= Antonomasia =

Figure of speech

In rhetoric, antonomasia is a kind of metonymy in which an epithet or phrase takes the place of a proper name, such as "the little corporal" for Napoleon I, or conversely the use of a proper name as an archetypal name, to express a generic idea. A frequent instance of antonomasia in the Late Middle Ages and early Renaissance was the use of the term "the Philosopher" to refer to Aristotle.

Stylistically, such epithets may be used for elegant variation to reduce repetition of names in phrases. The word comes from the Greek ἀντονομασία, antonomasia, itself from the verb ἀντονομάζειν, antonomazein 'to name differently'.

Antonomasia can also refer to the transformation of a proper name into a common name, carrying certain defining traits. For example, describing someone as an Apollo instead of as a handsome young man.

== Archetypal names ==
The opposite of antonomasia is an archetypal name. One common example in French is the word for fox: the Latin-derived French: goupil was replaced by French: renard, from Renart, the fox hero of the Roman de Renart (originally the German Reinhard).

== Examples ==
=== Persons ===
- "El Caudillo" for Francisco Franco
- "El Jefe" for Rafael Trujillo
- "Il Duce" for Benito Mussolini
- "La Divina" for Maria Callas
- "La Stupenda" for Joan Sutherland
- "Mr. Soul" for Sam Cooke
- "Old Blue Eyes" or "The Chairman of the Board" for Frank Sinatra
- "Pelides" or "the son of Peleus" for Achilles
- "Son of Laertes" or "Man of Pain" for Odysseus
- "The (Great) Bambino" for Babe Ruth
- "The Bard" for William Shakespeare
- "The Big Bopper" for Jiles Perry Richardson Jr
- "The Boss" for Bruce Springsteen
- "The Commentator" for Averroes (so named for his commentaries on "The Philosopher" Aristotle's works)
- "The Don" for Sir Donald Bradman
- "The Fab Four" for The Beatles
- "The First Lady of Song" for Ella Fitzgerald
- "The Führer" for Adolf Hitler
- "The Genius of the Carpathians" for Nicolae Ceausescu
- "The Gipper" or "The Great Communicator" for Ronald Reagan
- "The Great Commoner" for Winston Churchill
- "The Great Emancipator" or "Honest Abe" for Abraham Lincoln
- "The Great Silent One" for Helmuth von Moltke the Elder
- "The Greatest" for Muhammad Ali
- "The Hardest Working Man in Show Business" or "Soul Brother Number 1" or “The Godfather of Soul” for James Brown
- "The High Priestess of Soul" for Nina Simone
- "The Iron Chancellor" for Otto von Bismarck
- "The Iron Lady" or "The Leaderene" for Margaret Thatcher
- "Radical Jack" for John Lambton, 1st Earl of Durham
- "The King of Pop" for Michael Jackson
- "The King of Rock 'n Roll" for Chuck Berry, Elvis Presley, or Little Richard
- "The Little Corporal" or "Corsican Ogre" for Napoleon
- "The Little Master" for Sachin Tendulkar
- "Mahatma" for Mohandas Gandhi
- "The Man in Black" for Johnny Cash
- "The Master of Suspense" for Alfred Hitchcock
- "The Prince of Darkness" for William Francis Galvin and Ozzy Osbourne
- "The Queen of Pop" or "The Material Girl" for Madonna
- "The Little Bohemian Private" for Adolf Hitler before the Machtergreifung
- "The Queen of Soul" for Aretha Franklin
- "The Red Baron" for Manfred von Richthofen
- "The Shah" for Shah Mohammad Reza Pahlavi
- "The Stagirite" or "The Philosopher" for Aristotle
- "The Steel Butterfly" for Imelda Marcos
- "The Tiger of Mysore" for Tipu Sultan
- “El Libertador” for Simón Bolívar

=== Fictional characters ===
- "The Boy Who Lived" for Harry Potter
- "The Banshee Queen" for Sylvanas Windrunner
- "The Dark Knight" or "The Caped Crusader" for Batman (also referred as "The Dynamic Duo" when paired with fictional sidekick, Robin)
- the "Man of Steel" or the "Man of Tomorrow" for Superman
- "The Mother of Dragons" for Daenerys Targaryen
- the "Ring Bearer" for Frodo Baggins
- "The Mad Titan" for Thanos
- "The Betrayer" for Illidan Stormrage

=== Works of art ===
- "The Scottish Play" for Macbeth

=== Places ===
- "The Athens of America" for Boston
- "Auld Reekie" for Edinburgh
- "The Big Apple" for New York City
- "The Big Easy" for New Orleans
- "The City by the Bay" for San Francisco
- "The City of Brotherly Love" for Philadelphia
- "The City of Dreams" for Mumbai
- "The City of a Hundred Gates" for ancient Thebes, Egypt
- "The City of Kings" for Lima, Peru
- "The City of Lights" for Paris
- "The City of Palaces" for Mexico City
- "The City of the World's Desire" for Constantinople
- "The Eternal City," "Urbe," or "Caput mundi" for Rome
- "La Dominante," "La Serenissima," "Queen of the Adriatic," "City of Water," "City of Masks," "City of Bridges," "The Floating City," and "City of Canals" for Venice
- "La La Land" for Los Angeles
- "The Maiden City" For Derry
- "The Red Stick" for Baton Rouge
- "The Smoke" for London
- "The South American Athens" for Bogotá
- "The Square Mile" for The City of London
- "The Windy City" for Chicago
- "The Emerald City" for Seattle
- "Elbflorenz" (Florence of the Elbe) for Dresden
- "The Paris of the Tropics" for Manaus

== See also ==
- Allusion
- Eponym
- Sobriquet
- Synecdoche
- Trademark erosion
- Honorific nicknames in popular music
