= Yanagiwara Naruko =

Concubine of Emperor Meiji, mother of Emperor Taishō (1859-1943)

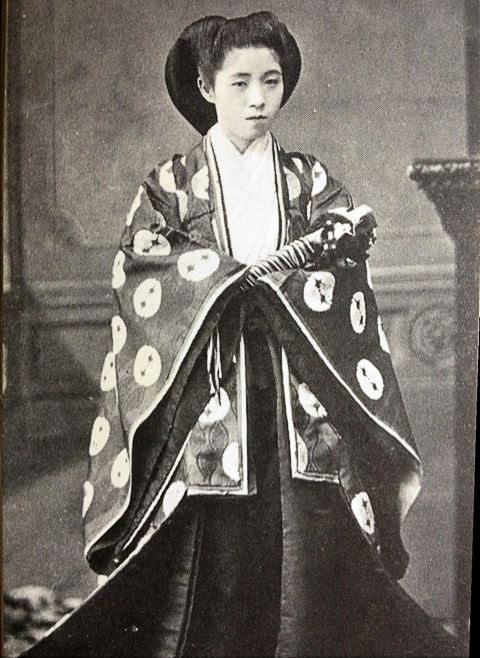

Imperial concubine to Emperor Meiji
- Tenure: 20 February 1873 – 30 July 1912
- Born: 26 June 1859; Kyoto, Japan
- Died: 16 October 1943 (aged 84); Tokyo, Japan
- Burial: Yūtenji, Nakameguro, Meguro, Tokyo
- Spouse: Emperor Meiji
- Issue: Shigeko, Princess Ume; Yukihito, Prince Take; Emperor Taishō
- Father: Yanagiwara Mitsunaru
- Mother: Hasegawa Utano

Yanagiwara Naruko (Japanese: 柳原愛子), also known as Sawarabi no Tsubone (26 June 1859 – 16 October 1943), was a Japanese lady-in-waiting of the Imperial House of Japan. A concubine of Emperor Meiji, she was the mother of Emperor Taishō and the last concubine to ever give birth to a reigning Emperor of Japan.

== Life ==
Yanagiwara Naruko was born in Kyoto as the second daughter of imperial chamberlain Yanagiwara Mitsunaru (1818–1885), who held the rank of chūnagon in the imperial household and was subsequently appointed dainagon. The Yanagiwara family were of the Reizei family line of the Fujiwara clan. Her elder brother, Count Yanagiwara Sakimitsu (4 May 1850 – 2 September 1894), fought in the Boshin War on the imperial side, subsequently becoming Lieutenant Governor of the Tōkaidō and later Governor of Yamanashi Prefecture. Entering the diplomatic service after the Restoration, he signed the Sino-Japanese Friendship treaty after the First Sino-Japanese War, was ennobled as a count and became a privy councillor, helping to draft the Imperial House Law before his death at the age of 44.

During her lifetime, Lady Naruko was described as an intelligent, graceful and gentle lady, admired by all in the harem. She was noted as an excellent poet and calligrapher. She joined the imperial household in 1870 as a lady-in-waiting to Empress Dowager Eishō, and was appointed gon no tenji (imperial concubine) on 20 February 1873. Lady Naruko and Emperor Meiji were both descended from the Ōgimachisanjō clan; both shared a great-great-grandfather in Ōgimachisanjō Sanetomo (1748–1785), a senior palace courtier, making them third cousins.

On 21 January 1875, she gave birth to her first child, Shigeko, Princess Ume, at the Aoyama Palace, but the princess died of meningitis the following year, on 8 June 1876. On 23 September 1877, she gave birth to Yukihito, Prince Take, who also died of meningitis before his first birthday, on 26 July 1878. On 31 August 1879, she gave birth to her third child and the only one to survive into adulthood, the future Emperor Taishō. The prolonged and extremely difficult birth resulted in Lady Naruko becoming hysterical, crying and screaming through the delivery. On 6 September, the emperor named his son Yoshihito, later giving him the title of Prince Haru. Owing to the difficult delivery, Lady Naruko did not recover her health for some time; as her son had contracted meningitis shortly after his birth, his life was feared for until he finally recovered in late December. As a result of her delicate health following her son's birth, she never again served the emperor as a physical concubine, though she retained the title.

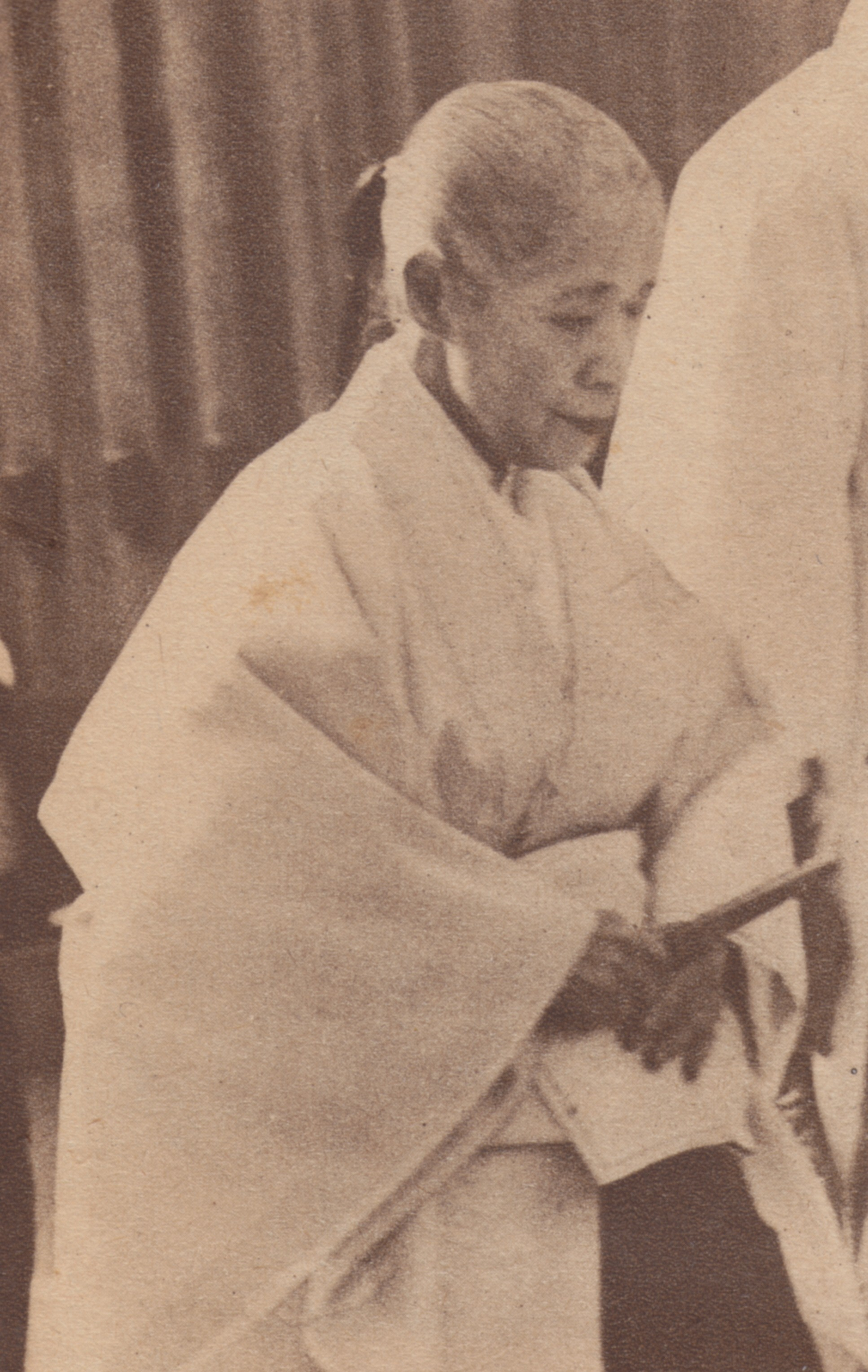
Yanagiwara Naruko in 1934

In 1902, she was officially appointed as an imperial lady-in-waiting. In her later years, she was conferred several prestigious honours in recognition of having continued the imperial line, despite a tendency to blame her for her son's increasingly poor mental health. However, she was permitted to be present at her son's deathbed in December 1926.

In 1941, Lady Naruko's great-grandniece, the Hon. Takagi Yuriko, married her grandson Prince Mikasa. Lady Naruko died on 16 October 1943, aged 84, in the reign of her grandson Emperor Shōwa, having outlived her son the previous emperor by nearly two decades. She was buried in Nakameguro Yūtenji (5-chome, Meguro-ku) in Tokyo.

== Honours ==
- Grand Cordon of the Order of the Sacred Treasure (10 May 1925; Second Class: 1 December 1915)
- Grand Cordon of the Order of the Precious Crown (11 February 1940)

=== Order of precedence ===
- Fourth rank (29 November 1892)
- Senior third rank (July 1913)
- Second rank (1 December 1915)
- Senior second rank (8 May 1919)
- First rank (16 October 1943; posthumous)

== Ancestry ==
Ancestors of Yanagiwara Naruko

8. Yanagiwara Naomitsu (1772–1812)
4. Yanagiwara Takamitsu (1793–1851)
9. Lady Ōgimachisanjō Yasuko (1774–1867)
2. Yanagiwara Mitsunaru (1818–1885)
10. Ōgimachisanjō Kinnori (1774–1800)
5. Lady Ōgimachisanjō Noriko (1797–1859)
11. Kanshūji Makoto
1. Lady Yanagiwara Naruko (1855–1943)
6. Hasegawa Yukiaki
3. Hasegawa Utano (1832–1891)
