= Kanako =

- Gender: Female

Origin
- Origin: Japanese
- Meaning: Different meanings depending on the kanji used

Kanako is a feminine Japanese given name.

== Written forms ==
Forms in kanji can include:

- 加奈子, "addition, (means nothing on its own), child"
- 香奈子, "fragrance, (means nothing on its own), child"
- 佳南子, "good, fine, etc., south, child"
- 香菜子, "fragrance, vegetables, child"
- 可南子, "acceptable, south, child"

== People with the name ==
- Kanako Abe (阿部 加奈子; born 1973), Japanese conductor, composer and pianist
- Kanako Domori (堂森 佳南子; born 1975), Japanese wheelchair tennis player
- Kanako Enomoto (榎本 加奈子; born 1980), Japanese actress and model
- Kanako Fukaura (深浦 加奈子; 1960-2008), Japanese actress
- Kanako Haginaga (萩永 佳奈子; born 1975), Japanese runner
- Kanako Higuchi (樋口 可南子; born 1958), Japanese actress
- Kanako Hirai (平井 香菜子; born 1984), Japanese volleyball player
- Kanako Hiramatsu (平松 可奈子; born 1991), Japanese former idol of idol group SKE48
- Kanako Inuki (犬木 加奈子; born 1958), Japanese manga writer and illustrator
- Kanako Itō (いとう かなこ; born 1973), Japanese singer
- Kanako Itō (footballer) (伊藤 香菜子; born 1983), Japanese women's footballer
- Kanako Kase (加瀬 加奈子; born 1980), Japanese professional racing cyclist
- Kanako Kitao (北尾 佳奈子; born 1982), Japanese-American synchronized swimmer
- Kanako Kobayashi (小林 花奈子; born 1998), Japanese rugby union player
- Kanako Kondō (近藤 佳奈子; born 1981), Japanese voice actress and singer
- Kanako Mitsuhashi (三橋 加奈子; born 1978), Japanese actress and voice actress
- Kanako Miyamoto (宮本 佳那子; born 1989), Japanese actress and singer
- Kanako Momota (百田 夏菜子; born 1994), Japanese singer and actress
- Kanako Morisaki (森崎 可南子; born 1996), Japanese tennis player
- Kanako Murakami (村上 佳菜子; born 1994), Japanese figure skater
- Kanako Murata (村田 夏南子; born 1993), Japanese mixed martial artist and former wrestler
- Kanako Naito (内藤 香菜子; 1980 – 2019), Japanese female volleyball player
- Kanako Nishi (西 加南子; born 1970), Japanese women's racing cyclist
- Kanako Nishi (author) (西 加奈子; born 1977), Japanese writer and artist
- Kanako Ogata (緒方 かな子; born 1973), Japanese singer and television personality
- Kanako Omura (大村 加奈子; born 1976), Japanese volleyball player
- Kanako Otsuji (尾辻 かな子; born 1974), Japanese politician and activist
- Kanako Sakai (酒井 香奈子; born 1986), Japanese voice actress
- Kanako Tahara (田原 可南子; born 1994), Japanese actress and singer
- Kanako Takatsuki (高槻 かなこ; born 1993), Japanese voice actress and singer
- Kanako Tanikawa (谷川 可奈子; born 1970), Japanese cyclist
- Kanako Tateno (立野 香菜子; born 1981), Japanese voice actor
- Kanako Tōjō (東條 加那子; born 1984), Japanese voice actress
- Kanako Urai (浦井 佳奈子; born 1981), Japanese professional wrestler, journalist and artist
- Kanako Watanabe (渡部 香生子; born 1996), Japanese swimmer
- Kanako Yanagihara (柳原 可奈子; born 1986), Japanese actor and comedian
- Kanako Yonekura (米倉 加奈子; born 1976), Japanese badminton player

== Fictional characters ==
- Kanako Yasaka (八坂 神奈子), a character in Mountain of Faith from Touhou Project
- Kanako Kurusu (来栖 加奈子), a character in the light novel series Oreimo
- Kanako Ketsukane (決鐘 仮名子), a character in the Undertale fangame Undertale Yellow
- Kanako Mimura (三村 かな子), a character in the game series The Idolmaster Cinderella Girls
