= Toyo Eiwa University =

Private Christian university in Midori-ku, Yokohama, Kanagawa Prefecture, Japan

Coordinates: 35°30′31.12″N 139°31′08.36″E

Toyo Eiwa University (東洋英和女学院大学, Tōyō Eiwa Jogakuin Daigaku, "Toyo Eiwa Women's University") is a private Christian university in Midori-ku, Yokohama, Kanagawa Prefecture, Japan. Established in 1989, it is part of the Toyo Eiwa Jogakuin founded in 1884 by Canadian missionary Martha J. Cartmell.

== Academics ==
Toyo Eiwa has two faculties: Human Sciences and Social Sciences. In the former are the departments of Human Sciences and of Human Welfare. The latter has two departments: Social Sciences and International Communication.

Features of Toyo Eiwa's curriculum include the freshman seminar and interdisciplinary lectures, open to all students. The university offers instruction in foreign languages, including English, and requires information-science courses. Overseas study is facilitated by agreements with Smith College and Duke University in the United States and summer English programs at Mount Allison University in Canada and Stanford University in the United States. In addition, Toyo Eiwa admits Japanese students who are returning or have returned from overseas, and students of other nationalities.

Toyo Eiwa has a graduate school, tailored to working men and women.

== Grade school ==
Toyo Eiwa Jogakuin, affiliated with Toyo Eiwa Women's University, educates from the elementary school to the university level. It is in Roppongi in Tokyo from the elementary school to the high school.
