= Hisa Ōta =

Japanese actress

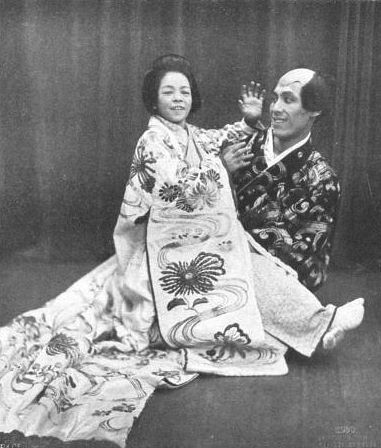
Hisa Ōta, presumably at the Ronacher in Vienna, Austria Sport & Salon, Vienna, 1908-04-04

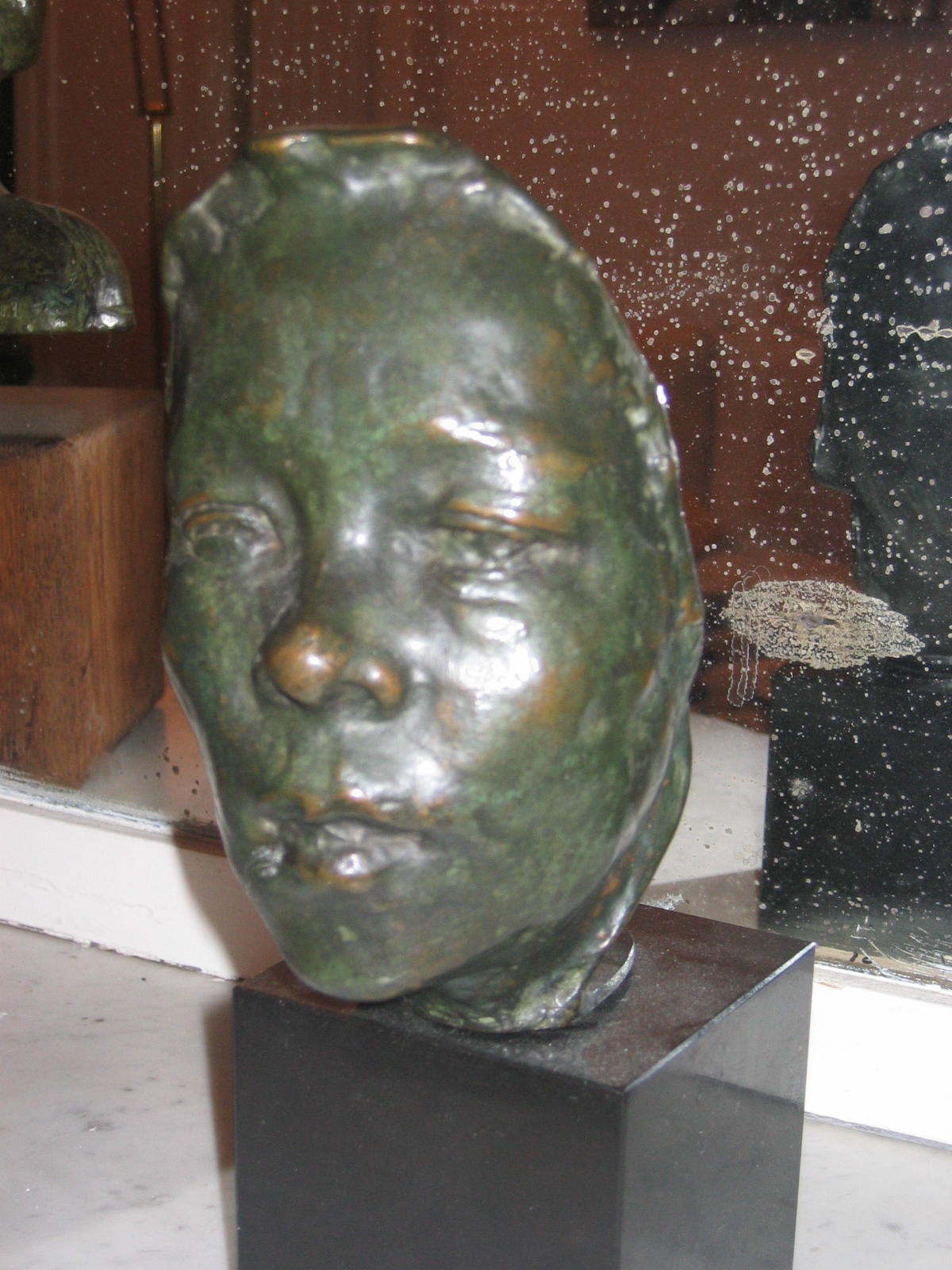
Mask created by Auguste Rodin

Hisa Ōta (大田 ひさ, Ōta Hisa; May 7, 1868 – April 2, 1945) was a Japanese stage actress who spanned the Meiji and Taishō periods of Japan and was known by the name Hanako (花子). The kanji given for her name when born were 飛佐 (Hisa), but she did not use those during her career.

Starting in 1902, she spent the majority of her career touring Europe and was the only Japanese person to model for Auguste Rodin, who gave her two masks he created, using Hanako as a model. These masks are on display in the city of Gifu in Gifu Prefecture, Japan, where she spent her twilight years. She was also the basis for Mori Ōgai's short story Hanako.

== Timeline ==
- 1868 - Born in Kamisobue, Nakashima, Owari Province (now Ichinomiya, Aichi) to a farmer.
- 1875 - Adopted by a green-grocer, as her family was unable to afford to feed her.
- 1884 - Became a geisha.
- 1888 - Married first husband.
- 1898 - Divorced first husband and married second husband.
- 1901 - Divorced second husband.
- 1902 - Travels to Europe for the first time.
- 1904 - Begins touring Germany with a performance troupe.
- 1906 - Meets Rodin in July.
- 1907 - Travels to America for the first time.
- 1910 - Travels to Russia for the first time.
- 1916 - Returns to Japan to recruit dancers for her troupe and begins touring Europe again.
- 1921 - Returns to Japan for good.
- 1927 - Adopts her brother's son.
- 1934 - Granddaughter is born.
