= Yukiko Kashiwagi =

Japanese actress (born 1947)

- Born: December 24, 1947 (age 78)
- Occupation: Actress

Yukiko Kashiwagi (柏木 由紀子, Kashiwagi Yukiko; born December 24, 1947) is a Japanese actress and the wife of Japanese singer Kyu Sakamoto from 1971 until his death in the August 1985 Japan Air Lines Flight 123 crash. In the 1970s, Kashiwagi retired from her career as an actress and instead presented a series of welfare performances with her husband in children's homes and nursing homes and on Japanese television. She was deeply mournful about her husband and often advocated for increased airline safety and precautions after his untimely passing

== Filmography ==
- 1970 – ブラボー!若大将 (Toho)
- 2003 – "Aozora-e-shoot!"
- 2005 – 少年と星と自転車 "Shonen to hoshi to jitensha"
- 2009 – The Harimaya Bridge

== Television ==
- 1966–1967 -– これが青春だ(NTV)
- 1969 – 炎の青春 -(NTV)

== In popular culture ==
- Yukiko Kashiwagi appeared in the documentary Seconds from Disaster Season 6: Episode 6 (2012) called "Terrified Over Tokyo" and Season 7: Episode 2 (2018) called "Deadly Design".

== Literature ==
- "Ue wo muite arukou", which reflects on Kashiwagi's husband, Kyu Sakamoto, and his death. It was published in 1986, ISBN 4-89353-079-8
