= Hanako Oshima =

- Born: October 7, 1973 (age 52); Tokyo, Japan
- Origin: Japan
- Genres: J-pop
- Occupations: Singer, songwriter
- Years active: 1992–present
- Website: www.hanakooshima.com

Hanako Oshima (大島花子, Ōshima Hanako; born October 7, 1973) is a Japanese singer and the daughter of actress Yukiko Kashiwagi and singer Kyu Sakamoto.

== Biography ==
Oshima was born in Tokyo, and is a graduate of Toyo Eiwa University. When she was 11 years old, her father, Kyu Sakamoto, was killed in the August 1985 Japan Air Lines Flight 123 crash. In October 2006 it was revealed that she was going to get married. In January 2007 she married the head of a Brazilian jujitsu dojo in Hawaii. On February 17, 2009, their first child, a boy, was born.

== Filmography ==
- 1995 – Himeyuri no tō (ひめゆりの塔)

== Books ==
- 1997, Egao no okurimono- Sakamoto Kyū shashinshū (笑顔の贈り物―坂本九写真集/The gift of a smiling face – Kyu Sakamoto photograph collection)
