= Hanako Muraoka =

Japanese novelist and translator

- 村岡花子
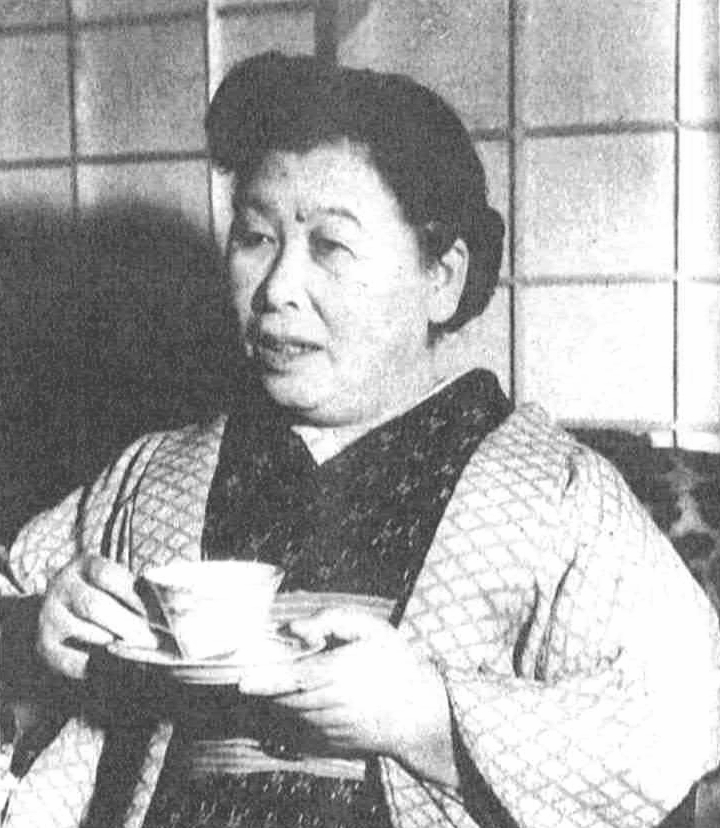
- Muraoka in 1953
- Born: Hana Annaka; June 21, 1893; Kōfu, Yamanashi, Japan
- Died: October 25, 1968 (aged 75); Ōta, Tokyo, Japan
- Occupations: Novelist, translator

Hanako Muraoka (村岡 花子, Muraoka Hanako; June 21, 1893 – October 25, 1968) was a Japanese novelist and translator. She is best known for translating Anne of Green Gables by L.M. Montgomery into Japanese.

== Early life and education ==
Muraoka was born on June 21, 1893, in Kofu, Yamanashi Prefecture. Her birth name was Hana Annaka (安中 はな, Annaka Hana). Her parents were Methodists, and she was raised a devout Christian. She studied at the Toyo Eiwa Jogakuin and began writing children's stories when she was encouraged by translator Hiroko Katayama. She graduated from school in 1913.

== Career ==
After graduation, Muraoka returned to Yamanashi and taught at a branch of the Tokyo Eiwa Jogakuin there. In 1917 she published her first book, Rohen (炉辺; "Fireside").

She married Keizo Muraoka in 1919. They had a son in 1920. In 1926, after Keizo's printing company went bankrupt after the 1923 Great Kanto Earthquake, they restarted the company in their home. Soon after that, their son died, leaving Muraoka depressed. Katayama encouraged her to translate Mark Twain's The Prince and the Pauper, and this helped her resume her normal routine.

In 1932, Muraoka started a radio show in which she would read the news to children. The show became very popular, and children all over Japan called her Rajio no Obasan (ラジオのおばさん; "Aunty Radio"). The show ended in the early 1940s as World War II began. Muraoka did not want to read news that referred to Canadians as the enemy because many of her friends were Canadian. On 5 December 1941, Shin-Ichi Shimizu, a Japanese naval officer en route to attack Pearl Harbor, heard an episode of her children's news programme fade away on the radio as the fleet moved out of range of the broadcast.

In 1939 Muraoka was given a copy of Anne of Green Gables by her friend Loretta Leonard Shaw, a Canadian missionary. Muraoka translated it during the war, bringing the draft with her during air raids. The book was published in 1952 and became a bestseller. It was even added to the Japanese school curriculum in the 1970s. Some translators later criticized Muraoka's translation because she had omitted some parts.

Muraoka planned her first trip to Prince Edward Island in 1968. She was never able to visit before she died of a stroke on October 25, 1968.

A television drama about Muraoka's life, Hanako to Anne, was broadcast on the NHK in 2014. It was based on her biography An no Yurikago: Muraoka Hanako no Shōgai (アンのゆりかご―村岡花子の生涯―; "Anne's Cradle: The Life of Hanako Muraoka"), which was written by her granddaughter, Eri Muraoka.

== Selected bibliography ==
=== Translations ===
- Mark Twain's The Prince and the Pauper (1927)
- Eleanor H. Porter's Pollyanna (1930)
- Harriet Beecher Stowe's Uncle Tom's Cabin (1948)
- Emma Orczy's The Scarlet Pimpernel (1950)
- Oscar Wilde's The Happy Prince (1951)
- Jean Webster's Daddy-Long-Legs (1951)
- L.M. Montgomery's Anne of Green Gables (1952) (sequels published from 1954–1959)
- Marie Louise de la Ramée's A Dog of Flanders (1952)
- Lewis Carroll's Alice's Adventures in Wonderland (1952)
- Frances Hodgson Burnett's A Little Princess (1954)
- Frances Hodgson Burnett's The Secret Garden (1955)
- Charles Kingsley's The Water-Babies, A Fairy Tale for a Land Baby (1956)
- Gene Stratton-Porter's Freckles (1957)
- Marjorie Kinnan Rawlings's The Yearling (1958)
- Mark Twain's Adventures of Huckleberry Finn (1959)
- L.M. Montgomery's Jane of Lantern Hill (1960)
- L.M. Montgomery's Emily's Quest (1969)
