= Yū =

Name list

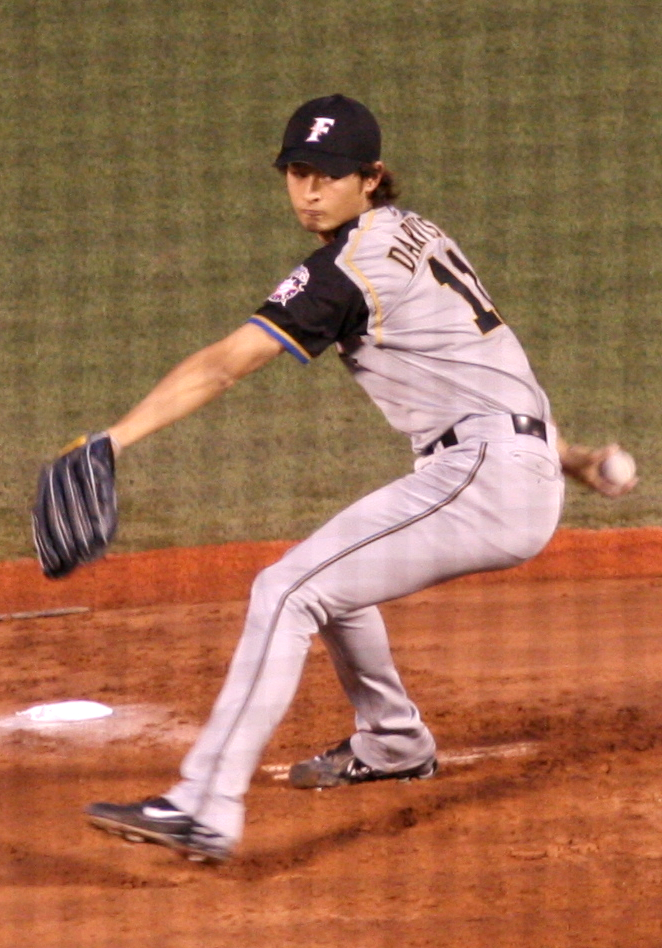
- Yū Darvish, a Japanese starting pitcher
- Pronunciation: /jɯː/ (IPA)
- Gender: Unisex

Origin
- Origin: Japanese
- Meaning: It can have many different meanings depending on the kanji used.
- Region of origin: Japan

Other names
- Related names: Yūji; Yūka; Yūki; Yūko; Yūri; Yūsuke; Yūta; Yūto

Yū or Yu or Yuu (ゆう, ユウ) is a very common Japanese given name used by either sex.

== Written forms ==
Yū can be written using different kanji characters and can mean:

- 優, "tenderness" or "superiority"
- 夕, "evening"
- 友, "friend"
- 有, "qualified"
- 勇, "courage"
- 祐, "help"
- 裕, "abundant"
- 雄, "masculine"
- 悠, "permanence"
- 由宇, "reason, eaves"
- 侑, "assist"

The name can also be written in hiragana or katakana.

== People ==
with the given name Yū

- Yu Aida (裕), a Japanese manga artist and illustrator
- Yū Aoi (優), a Japanese actress
- Yū Asagiri (夕), a Japanese manga artist
- Yū Asakawa (悠, born 1975), a Japanese voice actress
- Yu Darvish (有), an Iranian-Japanese starting pitcher
- Yu Fukumoto (福本 悠; born 2002), Japanese footballer
- Yū Hayami (優), a Japanese pop singer and actress
- Yū Hasebe (優), a Japanese actress, singer and model
- Yū Hayashi (勇), a Japanese voice actor and singer
- Yuu Kashii (由宇), a Japanese actress and model
- Yuu Kikkawa (友), a Japanese pop singer
- Yū Kikumura (憂), a member of the Japanese Red Army
- Yu Kimura (boxer) (木村 悠; born 1983), Japanese boxer
- Yu Kimura (footballer) (木村 裕; born 1994), Japanese footballer
- Yū Kobayashi (ゆう, born 1982), a Japanese voice actress
- Yu Kobayashi (footballer) (小林 悠; born 1987), Japanese footballer
- Yū Koyama (ゆう), a Japanese manga artist
- Yu Minobe (美濃部 ゆう; born 1990), Japanese artistic gymnast
- Yu Miyahara (宮原 優), Japanese sport wrestler
- Yuu Miyake (優), a Japanese composer and sound engineer
- Yū Mizushima (裕), a Japanese voice actor
- Yu Nakajima (悠), a Japanese Rubik's Cube solver
- Yu Nakasato (中里 優; born 1994), Japanese women's footballer
- Yū Sasahara (篠原 侑), Japanese voice actress
- Yū Serizawa (芹澤 優), Japanese voice actress and singer
- Yū Shiina (椎名 優), usually written You Shiina, Japanese illustrator and manga artist
- Yū Shimaka (裕), a Japanese voice actor
- Yū Shimamura (嶋村 侑; born 1985), Japanese voice actress
- Yuu Shirota (優), a Japanese-Spanish actor and singer
- Yuu Shiroyama (優), real name of The Gazette's guitarist Aoi
- Yū Sugimoto (ゆう), a Japanese voice actress
- Yu Suzuki (裕), a Japanese game designer and producer
- Yu Takahashi (高橋 優), a Japanese singer-songwriter
- Yū Terashima (優), a Japanese manga artist
- Yu Todoroki (悠), a Japanese Takarasienne
- Yū Wakui: (和久井 優), a Japanese voice actress
- Yuu Watase (悠宇), a Japanese shōjo manga artist
- Yuu Yabuuchi (優), a Japanese manga artist
- Yu Yagami (裕), a Japanese manga artist
- Yu Yamada (優), a Ryukyuan model, actress, and singer
- Yu Yokoyama (裕), a member of the Japanese idol group Kanjani8
- Yu Tomiyasu (悠), a member of the idol group NEXZ

== Fictional characters ==
with the given name Yū

- Yuu Asou (麻生 優雨), a character from the Fatal Frame III: The Tormented video game series
- Yu Ishigami (石上 優), a character from the manga series Kaguya-sama: Love is War
- Yu Kajima (カジマ), a character from the Gundam anime series
- Yū Kanda (ユウ), a main character in the manga series D.Gray-man
- Yū Kashima (遊), a character from the Monthly Girls' Nozaki-kun anime series
- Yu Kirasawa, a character from Ultraman Nexus known as the "Illustrator"
- Yū Kisaragi (如月 優), a character from the anime series The Idolmaster
- Yuu Koito, a character from the anime and manga series Bloom Into You
- Yū Komori (ユウ), a main character in Spider-Man: The Manga
- Yū Koito (小糸 侑), the main character from the anime Bloom into You
- Yū Kōtari (神足 ユウ), a character from the BLACK★ROCK SHOOTER anime series
- Yuu Matsuura (遊), a central character in the shōjo manga series Marmalade Boy
- Yū Nanba (難波 悠), a supporting character and party member in Yakuza: Like a Dragon
- Yu Narukami (鳴上 悠), the main protagonist from the video game Persona 4
- Yū Naruse (usually called Yuu-chan), a main character in the manga WataMote
- Yū Nishinoya (夕), a character from the Haikyū!! anime series
- Yu Ominae (優), the main character of the manga series Spriggan
- Yū Otosaka (乙坂 有宇), a character from the anime television series Charlotte
- Yū Takasaki (高咲 侑), a character from the anime series Love Live! Nijigasaki High School Idol Club
- Yū Sonoda (園田 優), a character from the manga series Sakura Trick
- Yū Tendo (天童 遊), a character from the anime series Beyblade: Metal Fusion
- Yū, a character from Dōbutsu no Mori (film)
