= Yuka =

Yuka may refer to:

- Yuka (music), an Afro-Cuban style of music
- Yuka (mammoth), mammoth specimen found in Yakutia, Russia
- Manshu Yuka Kogyo K.K. Ssuningkai, a Japanese-German pre-WWII industrial co-operation

== People ==
- Yuka (name), a Japanese personal name
- Yuka (singer, born 1970), also YUKA, Japanese singer
- Yuka (singer, born 1994), Japanese singer

== See also ==
- Yuca, a plant species
- Yucca (disambiguation)
- 裕華 (disambiguation)
