= Yūsuke =

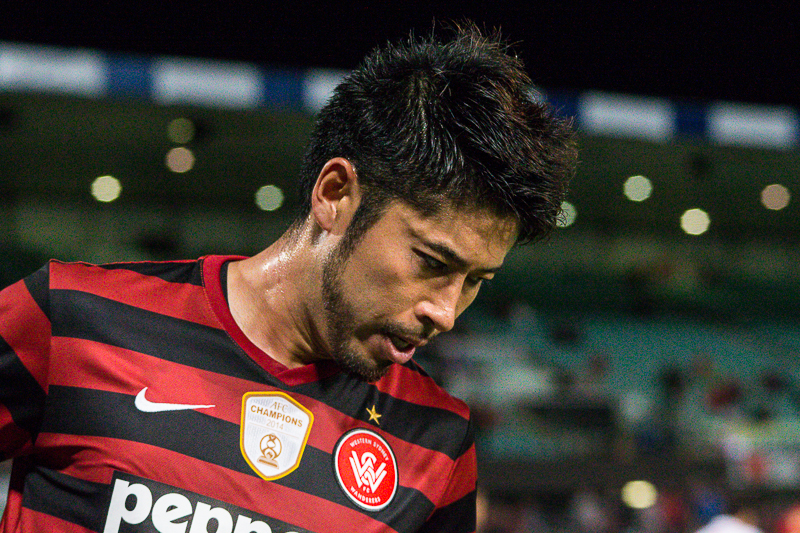
- Yusuke Tanaka, Japanese footballer
- Pronunciation: jɯːsɯke (IPA)
- Gender: Male

Origin
- Origin: Japanese
- Meaning: Different meanings depending on the kanji used
- Region of origin: Japan

Other names
- Alternative spelling: Yusuke (Kunrei-shiki) Yusuke (Nihon-shiki) Yūsuke, Yuusuke (Hepburn)

Yūsuke, Yusuke, or Yuusuke is a masculine Japanese given name.

== Written forms ==
Yūsuke can be written using different combinations of kanji characters. Some examples:

- 勇介, "courage, mediate"
- 勇助, "courage, to help"
- 勇輔, "courage, to help"
- 勇祐, "courage, to help"
- 勇佑, "courage, to help"
- 勇丞, "courage, to help"
- 雄介, "masculinity, mediate"
- 雄助, "masculinity, to help"
- 雄輔, "masculinity, to help"
- 雄祐, "masculinity, to help"
- 雄佑, "masculinity, to help"
- 雄丞, "masculinity, to help"
- 友介, "friend, mediate"
- 友助, "friend, to help"
- 友輔, "friend, to help"
- 有介, "possessing/having, mediate"
- 由介, "reason, mediate"
- 裕祐, "abundant, to help"
- 柚介, "citron, mediate"
- 愉祐, "pleasure, to help"

The name can also be written in hiragana ゆうすけ or katakana ユウスケ.

== Notable people with the name ==
- Yusuke Aihara (相原 裕介, born 1994), a Japanese professional vert skater
- Yusuke Chiba (チバ ユウスケ, born 1968), Japanese singer who formerly sang for Thee Michelle Gun Elephant and is the founder of the garage rock band The Birthday
- Yusuke Fujimoto (藤本 祐介, born 1975), Japanese former heavyweight kickboxer
- Yusuke Fujioka (藤岡 佑介; born 1986), Japanese jockey
- Yusuke Hagihara (萩原 雄祐, 1897–1979), Japanese astronomer known for his contributions to celestial mechanics
- Yusuke Hashiba (羽柴 雄輔, 1851-1921), Japanese archaeologist
- Yusuke Hatanaka (畑中 勇介, born 1985), Japanese cyclist
- Yusuke Hatano (波多野 裕介, born 1986), Japanese composer and arranger
- Yusuke Hayashi (林 勇介, born 1990), Japanese footballer
- Yusuke Higa (比嘉 祐介, born 1989), Japanese footballer who plays for the Yokohama F. Marinos
- Yusuke Hino (日野 裕介, born 1985), Japanese professional wrestler
- Yusuke Ina (伊奈 祐介; born 1975), Japanese shogi player
- Yusuke Inuzuka (犬塚 友輔; born 1983), Japanese footballer
- Yusuke Iseya (伊勢谷 友介, born 1976), Japanese actor
- Yusuke Kamiji (上地 雄輔, born 1979), Japanese actor, singer, and tarento
- Yusuke Kaneko (金子 祐介, born 1976), Japanese ski jumper
- Yusuke Kato (加藤 友介, born 1986), Japanese footballer, who plays for Nakhon Ratchasima F.C. in the Thai Premier League
- Yusuke Kobori (小堀 佑介, born 1981), retired Japanese professional boxer and former WBA lightweight champion
- Yuusuke (musician) (ユウスケ, full name Yusuke Kuniyoshi 国吉祐輔, born 1985), musician and one of the two vocalists of the hard rock band High and Mighty Color
- Yusuke Matsui (松井 佑介, born 1987), Japanese baseball player
- Yusuke Mine (峰 祐介, born 1934), Japanese actor best known for his role on the 26-lesson TV program Let's Learn Japanese
- Yusuke Mori (森 勇介, born 1980), Japanese footballer who plays for Tokyo Verdy
- Yusuke Morozumi (両角 友佑; born 1985), Japanese curler
- Yusuke Murata (村田 雄介, born 1978), Japanese manga artist
- Yusuke Naora (直良 有祐, born 1971), Japanese video game art director and character designer at Square Enix
- Yusuke Nishiyama (footballer) (西山 雄介; born 1994), Japanese footballer
- Yusuke Nishiyama (runner) (西山 雄介; born 1994), Japanese long-distance runner
- Yusuke Niwai (庭井 祐輔; born 1991), Japanese rugby union player
- Yusuke Numata (沼田 祐介, born 1968), Japanese voice actor
- Yusuke Oeda (大枝 雄介, 1935–2010), Japanese professional Go player
- Yusuke Okada (basketball) (岡田 優介, born 1984), Japanese basketball player
- Yusuke Omi (近江 友介, born 1946), Japanese footballer
- Yusuke Saikawa (斉川 雄介, born 1985), Japanese former soccer player
- Yusuke Sato (佐藤 悠介, born 1977), Japanese footballer
- Yusuke Shimada (島田 裕介, born 1982), Japanese footballer
- Yusuke Shimizu (志水 祐介; born 1988), Japanese water polo player
- Yusuke Shirai (白井 悠介; born 1986), Japanese voice actor
- Yusuke Suzuki (racewalker) (鈴木 雄介, born 1988), Japanese racewalker
- Yusuke Santamaria (ユースケ・サンタマリア, real name Yusuke Nakayama 中山 裕介, born 1971), Japanese singer and actor
- Yusuke Takahashi (高橋 悠介, born 1997), Japanese tennis player
- Yusuke Tamura (田村 友佑; born 1998), Japanese long-distance runner
- Yusuke Tanaka (football forward) (田中 佑昌, born 1986), a Japanese footballer who plays for the J. League team JEF United Ichihara Chiba
- Yusuke Tanaka (football defender) (田中 裕介, born 1986), Japanese footballer who plays for the J. League team Kawasaki Frontale
- Yusuke Tanaka (gymnast), Japanese gymnast who competed for Japan in the 2012 Summer Olympics
- Yusuke Tomoi (友井 雄亮, born 1980), Japanese actor from Hokkaidō Japan
- Yusuke Torigoe (鳥越 裕介; born 1971), Japanese baseball player
- Yusuke Toyama (遠山 雄亮; born 1979), Japanese shogi player
- Yusuke Yachi (谷内 雄亮, born 1980), Japanese race walker
- Yusuke Yada (谷田 悠介, born 1983), Japanese footballer currently playing for Kataller Toyama
- Yusuke Yamagata (山形 雄介, born 1986), Japanese footballer
- Yusuke Yamamoto (山本裕典, born 1988), Japanese actor from Aichi Japan

== Fictional characters ==
- Yusuke Amamiya (天宮 勇介), a character in the Super Sentai television series Choujuu Sentai Liveman
- Yusuke Fujisaki (藤崎 佑助), the main character of Sket Dance anime and manga
- Yusuke Fujiwara (藤原 優介), a character in the anime spin-off series Yu-Gi-Oh! Duel Monsters GX
- Yusuke Godai (五代 雄介), the main character in the tokusatsu television series Kamen Rider Kuuga
- Yusuke Kitagawa (喜多川 祐介), a playable character from Persona 5
- Yusuke Makishima (巻島 裕介), a character of Yowamushi Pedal
- Yusuke Oda (小田 裕介), a character of Hajime no Ippo
- Yusuke Tozawa (斗沢 祐介), a recurring character of Witchblade
- Yusuke Yoshino (芳野 祐介), a character from the visual novel, manga, and anime Clannad
- Yusuke Urameshi (浦飯 幽助), the main character in the YuYu Hakusho anime and manga series
