= Yuka Saitō =

Yuka Saitō may refer to:

- Yuka Saitō (essayist) (斎藤 由香, born 1962), Japanese essayist
- Yuka Saitō (voice actress) (斉藤 佑圭, born 1986), Japanese voice actress

== See also ==
- Saitō
- Yuka (name)
