= Gentlemen's agreement =

Informal, non-binding agreement, sometimes based on honor

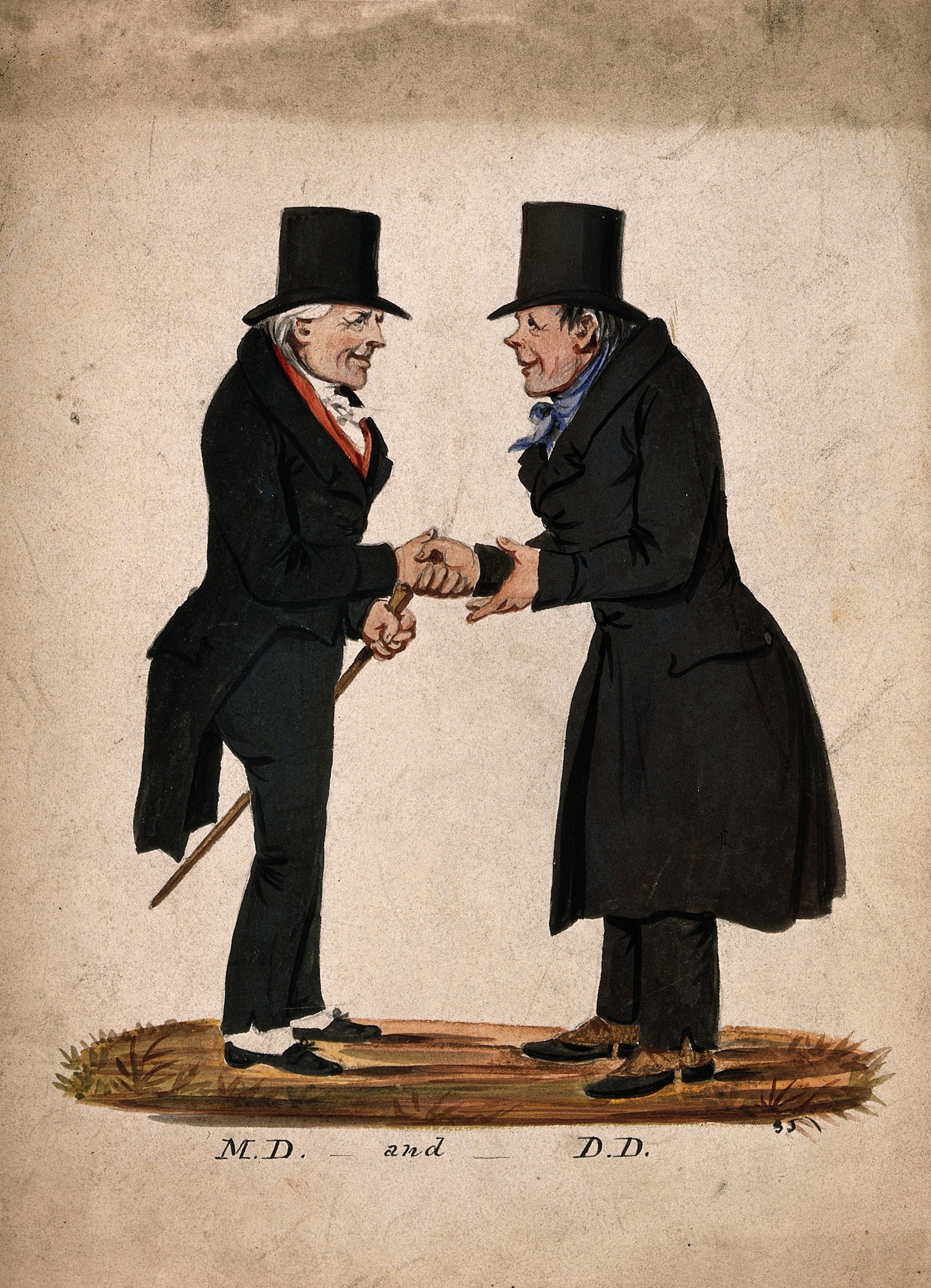
Gentlemen's agreements are often verbal and solidified by a handshake.

A gentlemen's agreement, or gentleman's agreement, is an informal and legally non-binding agreement between two or more parties. It is typically oral, but it may be written or simply understood as part of an unspoken agreement by convention or through mutually beneficial etiquette. The essence of a gentlemen's agreement is that it relies upon the honor of the parties for its fulfillment, rather than being in any way enforceable. It is distinct from a legal agreement or contract. A more formal (but still non-binding) form of the gentlemen's agreement is the memorandum of understanding.

== History ==
The phrase appears in the British parliamentary records in 1821 and in the Massachusetts public records in 1835. The Oxford English Dictionary cites P. G. Wodehouse's 1929 story collection Mr Mulliner Speaking as the first appearance of the term.

=== Industry ===
A gentleman's agreement, defined in the early 20th century as "an agreement between gentlemen looking toward the control of prices," was reported by one source to be the loosest form of a "pool." Such agreements have been reported to be found in every type of industry and were numerous in the American steel and iron industries of the early 20th century.

A report from the United States House of Representatives detailing their investigation of the United States Steel Corporation asserted that there were two general types of loose associations or consolidations between steel and iron interests in the 1890s in which the individual concerns retained ownership as well as a large degree of independence: the "pool" and the "gentleman's agreement." The latter type lacked any formal organization to regulate output or prices or any provisions for forfeiture in the event of an infraction. The efficacy of the agreement relied on members to keep informal pledges.

In the automotive industry, Japanese manufacturers agreed that no production car would have more than 280 PS (276 hp; 206 kW); the agreement ended in 2005. German manufacturers limit the top speed of high-performance saloons (sedans) and station wagons to 250 kilometres per hour (155 mph). Some automakers, such as Mercedes-Benz, offer options to increase or remove the speed limiter. When the Suzuki Hayabusa motorcycle exceeded 310 km/h (190 mph) in 1999, fears of a European ban or regulatory crackdown led Japanese and European motorcycle makers to agree to a limit of 300 km/h (186 mph) in late 1999. See List of fastest production motorcycles.

=== International relations ===
After intense anti-Japanese sentiment developed on the West Coast, US President Theodore Roosevelt did not want to anger Japan by supporting legislation to bar Japanese immigration to the United States, as had been done for Chinese immigration. Instead, there was an informal "Gentlemen's Agreement" (1907–8) and a corresponding informal Ladies' Agreement between the United States and Japan, whereby Japan made sure there was very little or no movement to the US. The agreements were made by US Secretary of State Elihu Root and Japan's Foreign Minister, Tadasu Hayashi. The agreement banned emigration of Japanese laborers to the United States and rescinded the segregation order of the San Francisco School Board in California, which had humiliated and angered the Japanese. The agreement did not apply to the Territory of Hawaii. The agreements remained effective until 1924, when Congress forbade all immigration from Japan. Similar anti-Japanese sentiment in Canada at the same time led to the Hayashi-Lemieux Agreement, also referred to as the "Gentlemen's Agreement of 1908", with substantially similar clauses and effects.

=== Trade policies ===
Gentlemen's agreements have come to regulate international activities such as the coordination of monetary or trade policies. According to Edmund Osmańczyk in the Encyclopedia of the United Nations and International Agreements, it is also defined as "an international term for an agreement made orally rather than in writing, yet fully legally valid". This type of agreement may allow a nation to avoid the domestic legal requirements to enter into a formal treaty, or it may be useful when a government wants to enter into a secret agreement that is not binding upon the next administration. According to another author, all international agreements are gentlemen's agreements because, short of war, they are all unenforceable. Osmańczyk pointed out that there is a difference between open gentlemen's agreements and secret diplomatic agreements. In the United States, a prohibition against gentlemen's agreements in commercial relations between states was introduced in 1890, because the secretive nature of such agreements was beyond anyone's control.

In English contract law, for an agreement to be binding, there must be an intention to create legal relations; but in commercial dealings (i.e. agreements that are not between family members or friends) there is a legal presumption of an "intention to create legal relations". However, in the 1925 case of Rose & Frank Co v JR Crompton & Bros Ltd, the House of Lords held that the phrase, "This arrangement is not ... a formal or legal agreement ... but is only a record of the intention of the parties" was sufficient to rebut the said presumption.

=== As a discriminatory tactic ===
Gentlemen's agreements were a widely used discriminatory tactic reportedly more common than restrictive covenants in preserving the homogeneity of upper-class neighborhoods and suburbs in the United States. The nature of these agreements made them extremely difficult to prove or to track, and were effective long after the United States Supreme Court's rulings in Shelley v. Kraemer and Barrows v. Jackson. A 1995 source stated that gentlemen's agreements "undoubtedly still exist", but that their use had greatly diminished.

Until Jackie Robinson was hired by the Brooklyn Dodgers in 1946, a gentlemen's agreement ensured that African American players were excluded from organized baseball.

== See also ==
- Antitrust
- Bro Code
- Gentlemen's Agreement of 1956
- Good faith
- Handshake
- News embargo
- Nudum pactum
- Voluntary compliance
