= Yūko =

Other names
- Related names: Yū; Yūka; Yūki

Yūko or Yuko (ゆうこ, ユウコ) or Yuuko is a common feminine Japanese given name.

== Written forms ==
Yūko can be written using different kanji characters and can mean:

- 優子, "gentle, child"
- 裕子, "abundance, child"
- 祐子, "providential help, blessing, child"
- 夕子, "evening, child"
- 有子, "qualified, child"
- 悠子, "permanence, child"
- 侑子, "leading, child"
- 結子, "bind, child"
- 由子, "reason, child"
- 勇子, "courage, child"
- 友子, "friend, child"
- 木綿子, "cotton, child"

The given name can also be written in hiragana or katakana.

== People ==
- Yūko Andō (news anchor) (優子), Japanese TV presenter and news anchor
- Yūko Andō (singer) (裕子; born 1977), Japanese singer-songwriter
- Yuko Aoki (裕子; born 1977), Japanese bikini model
- Yuko Arimori (裕子; born 1966), Japanese marathon runner
- Yūko Asano (ゆう子; born 1960), Japanese singer and actress
- Yuko Fueki (優子; born 1979), Japanese actress who is most popular in South Korea, known as Yoo Min
- Yuko Goto (裕子), (born 1975) Japanese voice actress
- Yuko Hara (由子; born 1956), plays the keyboards for Southern All Stars
- Yuko Hara (voice actress) (優子; born 1992), Japanese voice actress
- Yuko Inoue (井上 祐子), Japanese classical violinist
- Yuko Ito (裕子; born 1974), Japanese fashion model and actress
- Yuko Kawaguchi (悠子; born 1981), Japanese pair skater
- Yuko Kobayashi (小林 優子; born 1961), Japanese voice actress
- Yuko Maruyama (裕子; born 1989), Japanese volleyball player
- Yūko Minaguchi (裕子; born 1966), Japanese voice actress
- Yūko Miyamura (優子; born 1972), Japanese voice actress, actress, J-pop singer and sound director
- Yuko Mizuno (水野 裕子; born 1982), Japanese television personality and actress
- Yūko Mizutani (優子; 1964–2016), Japanese voice actress
- Yūko Mochizuki (優子; 1917–1977), Japanese actress
- Yuko Moriguchi (森口 祐子; born 1955), Japanese golfer
- Yūko Nakagawa (郁子; born 1958), Japanese politician
- Yūko Nakamura (優子; born 1975), Japanese actress
- Yuko Nakanishi (悠子; born 1981), Japanese butterfly swimmer
- Yuko Nakazawa (裕子), J-pop singer and actress
- Yuko Ogura (優子; born 1983), Japanese idol and model
- Yuko Oshima (大島 優子; born 1988), AKB48 member
- Yuko Sano (優子; born 1979), Japanese volleyball player
- Yūko Sasaki (佐々木 優子; born 1982), Japanese cricketer
- Yuko Sato (athlete) (佐藤 優子; born 1968), Japanese racewalker
- Yuko Sato (politician) (佐藤 夕子; born 1963), Japanese politician
- Yūko Satō (voice actress) (佐藤 ゆうこ), Japanese voice actress
- Yūko Sanpei (三瓶 由布子; born 1986) a Japanese voice actress
- Yuko Shimizu (侑子; born 1946), Japanese designer, creator of Hello Kitty
- Yuko Shimizu (actress) (清水 ゆう子; born 1988), Japanese actress and gravure idol
- Yuko Shimizu (illustrator) (清水 裕子), Japanese illustrator
- Yuko Suzuki (裕子; born 1989), Japanese volleyball player
- Yuko Takahashi (高橋 侑子; born 1991), Japanese triathlete
- Yuko Takayama (侑子; born 1992), Japanese actress
- Yuko Takeuchi (結子; 1980–2020), Japanese actress
- Yuko Tojo (由布子; 1939–2013), Granddaughter of General Hideki Tōjō
- Yūko Tsuno (裕子; born 1966), Japanese manga artist and doujin writer
- Yuko Yamaguchi (裕子; born 1955), Japanese character designer and illustrator
- Yuko Yamashita (裕子), Japanese straight hair specialist

== Fictional characters ==
- Yuko, a female elf from Mia and Me, a children's TV series
- Yuko, an antagonist character in Sexy Parodius
- Yuko, a female character from Sword Art Online
- Yūko, a female character and the yūrei in The Terror: Infamy
- Yuuko Aioi, a main character from the anime and manga series Nichijou
- Yuko Amamiya, the heroine of the game Ef: A Fairy Tale of the Two
- Yuko Amasawa, one of the main characters in the series Dennō Coil
- Yuko Asou, the main character in the Valis series
- Yuko Ichihara - Witch of dimensions, a character from the manga and anime xxxHolic and Tsubasa: Reservoir Chronicle by CLAMP
- Yūko Kanoe, a character from the manga and anime Dusk Maiden of Amnesia
- Yuko Minami, Ultraman Ace's alter ego alongside Seiji Hokuto in the 1972 namesake tokusatsu film
- Yuko Ogawa, a character from the manga and anime Kocchi Muite! Miiko
- Yuko Okonogi, one of the main characters in the series Dennō Coil
- Yuko Omori, a character from the anime HappinessCharge PreCure!
- Yuko Sakaki, a character in the novel Battle Royale, and the film and manga of the same name
- Yuuko Shirakawa, a librarian from the visual novel Katawa Shoujo
- Yuko Takao, a character in Shin Megami Tensei III: Nocturne
- Yūko Yoshida, the protagonist of the manga and anime The Demon Girl Next Door
- Yuuko Yoshikawa, a character from the novel and anime Hibike! Euphonium
- Yuuko Nishi a character from the manga and anime A Channel (manga)

== See also ==
- 5291 Yuuko, a main-belt asteroid
- "Yuko and Hiro", a song by Blur
