= Yuko =

Yuko may refer to:

- Yuko (judo) (yūkō), a score in judo competition
- Yuko (Ukrainian band), a Ukrainian band
- Yūko, a Japanese female given name (including a list of persons with the name)
- Yuko people, an Amerindian ethnic group

== See also ==
- Yukou (Japanese citrus)
