= Japan Foundation =

Japanese semi-governmental organisation

Coordinates: 35°41′15″N 139°43′04″E

- Founded: 1972; 54 years ago
- Founder: Government of Japan
- Type: Cultural institution
- Legal status: Independent Administrative Institution
- Location: Shinjuku, Tokyo
- Origins: Act of the National Diet
- Region served: Worldwide
- Product: Japanese cultural education
- Website: http://www.jpf.go.jp/

The Japan Foundation (国際交流基金, Kokusai Kōryū Kikin) is a Japanese foundation that spreads Japanese culture around the world. Based in Tokyo, it was established in 1972 by an Act of the National Diet as a special legal entity to undertake international dissemination of Japanese culture. It then became an Independent Administrative Institution under the jurisdiction of the Ministry of Foreign Affairs on 1 October 2003 under the "Independent Administrative Institution Japan Foundation Law".

The Japan Foundation aims towards comprehensive and effective development of its international cultural exchange programs in the following categories:

1. Promotion of (Japanese) arts and cultural exchange
2. Promotion of (overseas) Japanese-language education (the JLPT exam)
3. Promotion of (overseas) Japanese studies and intellectual exchange – Japan Foundation Information Centers collect and provide information about international exchange and international cultural exchange standard bearers.

Prince Takamado served as administrator of the Japan Foundation from 1981 to 2002.

== Japan Foundations worldwide ==
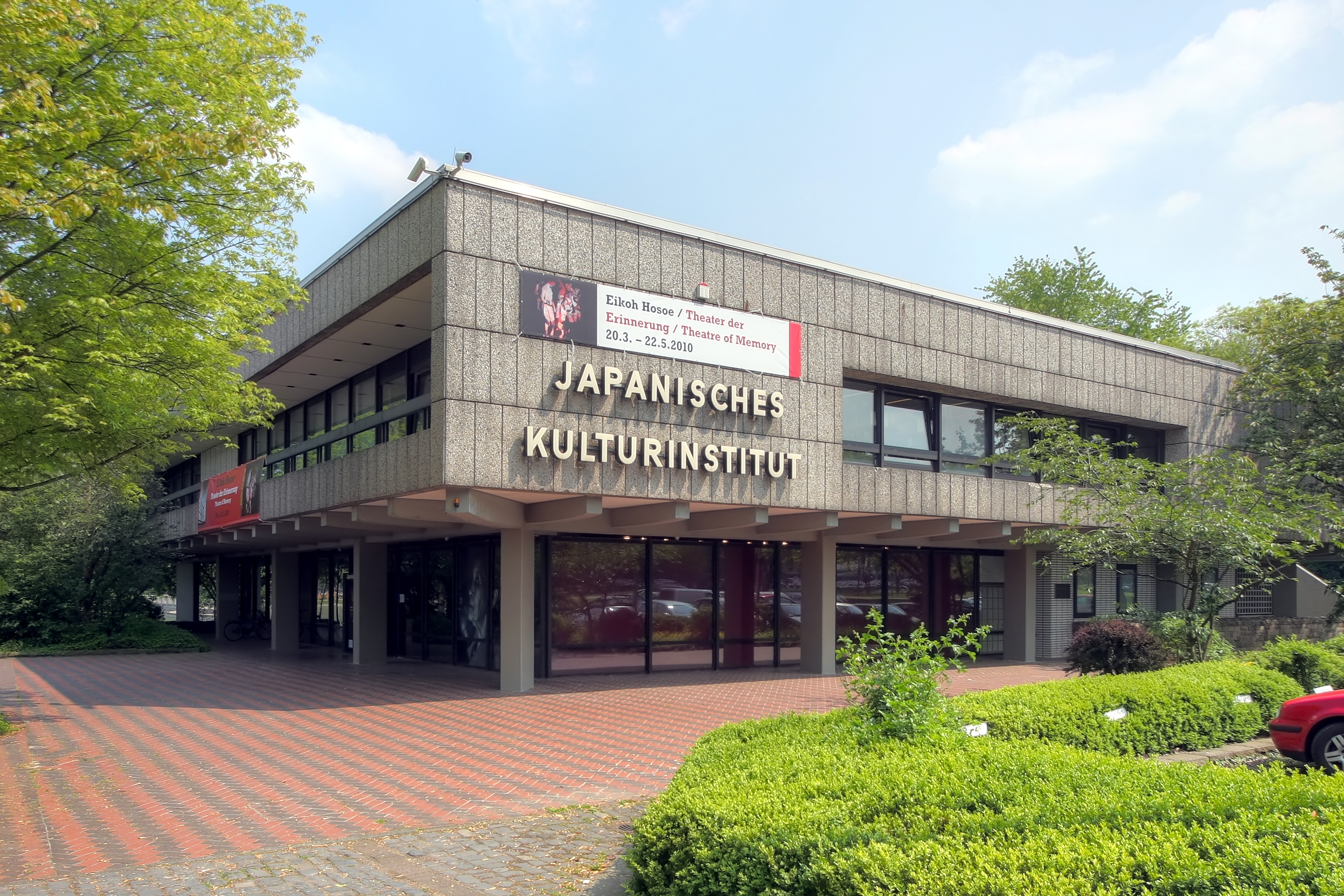
Building of the "Japanisches Kulturinstitut" in Cologne, Germany

The Japan Cultural Institute in Paris, France

The Japan Foundation is headquartered in Shinjuku, Tokyo, and has a subsidiary office in Kyoto. There are also two domestic Japanese-Language Institutes in Saitama and Tajiri, Osaka.

Internationally, the Japan Foundation maintains 25 overseas branches in 24 countries:

=== Asia and Oceania ===
- Australia (Sydney)
- Cambodia (Phnom Penh)
- China (Beijing)
- India (New Delhi)
- Indonesia (Jakarta)
- Laos (Vientiane)
- Malaysia (Kuala Lumpur)
- Myanmar (Yangon)
- Philippines (Manila)
- South Korea (Seoul)
- Thailand (Bangkok)
- Vietnam (Hanoi)

=== The Americas ===
- Brazil (São Paulo)
- Canada (Toronto)
- Mexico (Mexico City)
- Peru (Lima)
- United States (Los Angeles, New York City)

=== Europe, Middle East and Africa ===
- Egypt (Cairo)
- France (Paris)
- Germany (Cologne)
- Hungary (Budapest)
- Italy (Rome)
- Russia (Moscow)
- Spain (Madrid)
- United Kingdom (London)

== Activities ==
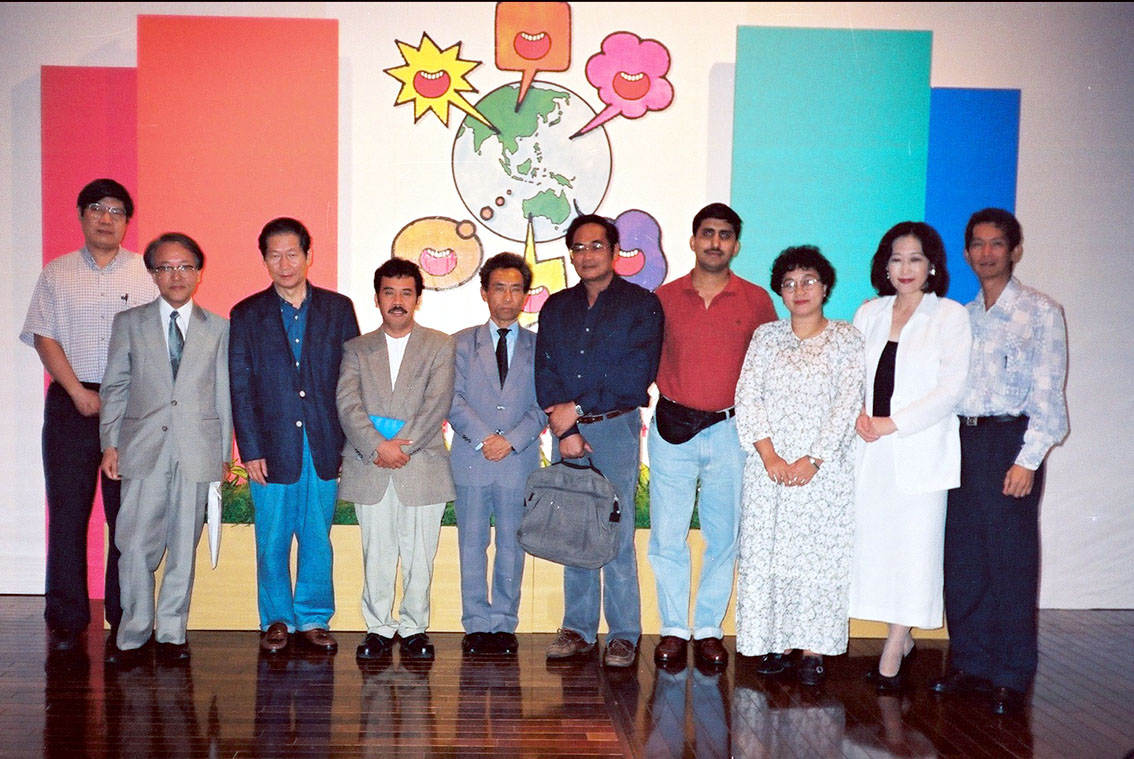
Delegates of 3rd Asian Cartoon Exhibition, held at Tokyo, in July 1997, organized by The Japan Foundation Asia Center

- Let's Learn Japanese – educational Japanese-language learning series, produced 1985, 1995, and 2007
- JF Nihongo - Japanese language classes offered using the Can-do evaluation system
- Japanese Language Proficiency Test – Japan Foundation co-proctors exam overseas

=== Asian Cartoon Art Exhibition ===
From 1995 onward regularly inviting leading cartoonists from various Asian countries to conduct Asian Cartoon Exhibition and Conference at The Japan Foundation Asia Center, Tokyo as an annual event. Later on the same exhibition travels to the various Asian countries. In the process, it has employed the friendly medium of cartoons for introducing Asian societies to those who would like to know more about them and appreciate people other than their own kind.

== Wochi Kochi Magazine ==
The Wochi Kochi Magazine (をちこちMagazine) is a Japanese website designed by the Japan Foundation to enhance the strength of information transmission about Japanese culture to the world. It replaced the paper magazines Kokusai-Kouryu (International Exchanges) (1974–2004) and Wochi-Kochi (Far and Near) (2004–2009). Those were the only domestic paper magazines which were especially published for "international cultural exchanges". The word "wochi-kochi" itself is a pronoun from ancient Japanese "Yamato" language meaning "here and there" or "the future and the present". As the web magazine title, "wochi-kochi" demonstrates places and times, and it expresses the desires to spread Japanese language/culture overseas, moreover, play a role as the cultural bridge among countries and people. Keeping those aspects from previous magazines, the Wochi-Kochi Magazine website carries interviews, contributed articles and serialized stories written by the experts from various professional fields each month.

== Japanese Film Database (JFDB) ==
The Japanese Film Database (JFDB) (日本映画データベース) is an online information directory of films made in Japan. The database is co-produced by the Japan Foundation together with UniJapan, and exhibited bilingually in Japanese and English.

== JFF Theater ==
JFF Theater

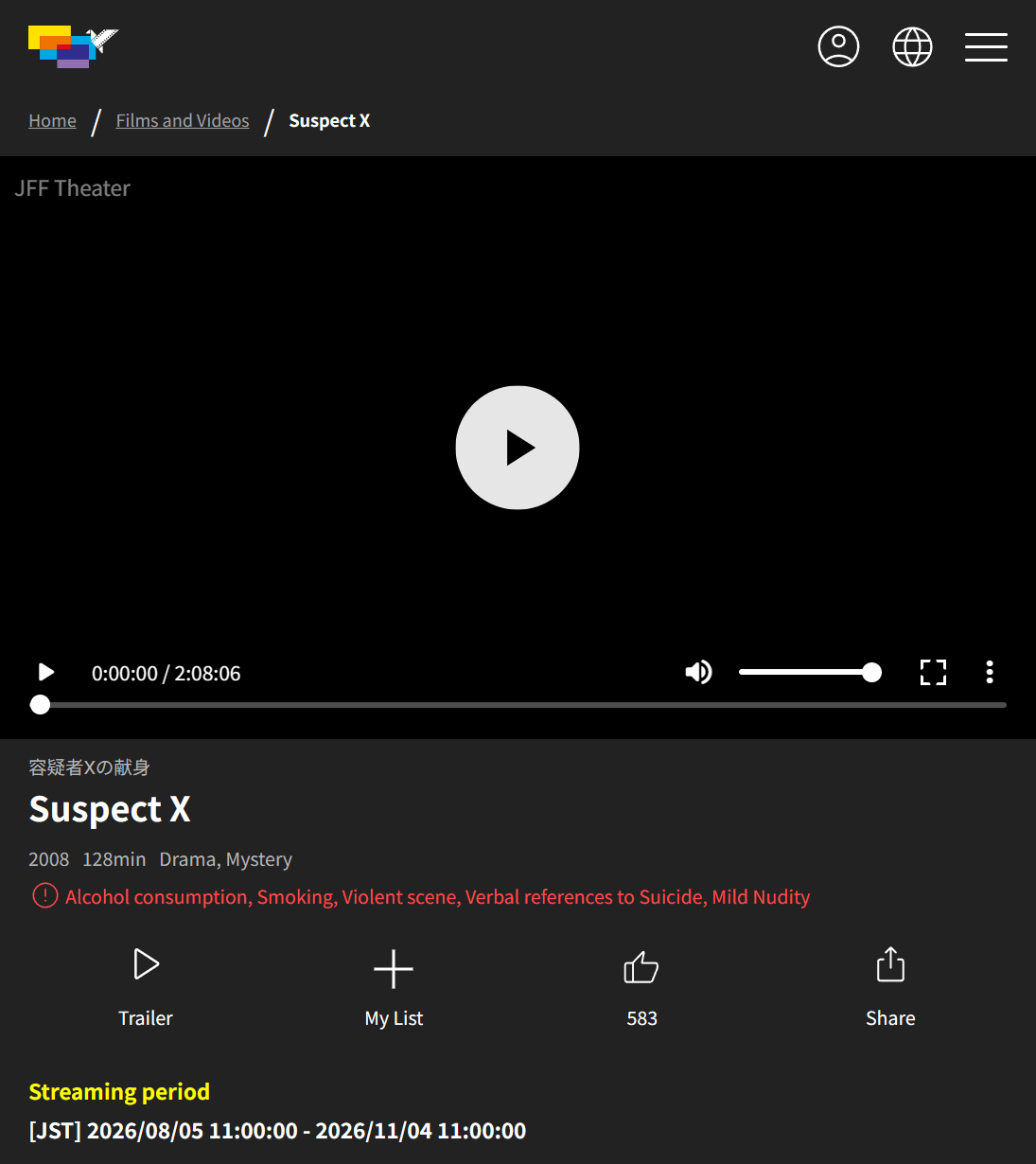
- Playback page for the film Suspect X (2008); the caption warns of its available period on the platform, from August through November 2026
- Website type: OTT platform
- Available in: 19 languages: Japanese; English; Arabic; Burmese; Simplified Chinese; Traditional Chinese; French; German; Hungarian; Indonesian; Italian; Khmer; Korean; Lao; Malay; Portuguese; Spanish; Thai; Vietnamese
- Headquarters: Japan
- Owner: Japan Foundation (2026–present)
- Industry: Entertainment
- Website: jff.jpf.go.jp
- Advertising: No
- Commercial: No
- Registration: Required
- Users: 240 thousand (August 2026)
- Launched: 1 August 2024; 2 years ago
- Current status: Active

The JFF Theater (short for Japanese Film Festival Theater) is a free online streaming platform launched by the Japan Foundation, aimed at distributing Japanese films and other works worldwide, free of charge. It was launched in August 2024, though it is a permanent version of a previous seasonal service called Japanese Film Festival Online, which had its first run in 2021, motivated by the COVID-19 pandemic.

Films are available with multilingual subtitles. The service's catalog of works is dynamic, with new titles being added and some removed after some time; additionally, not all titles are available in all regions.

By September 2024, the platform had reached 20,000 registered users; two years later, in August 2026, that number had grown to 240,000.

== See also ==
- Nippon Foundation
- Korea Foundation
- Singapore International Foundation
- British Council
- Alliance Française
- Cultural Diplomacy
- Public diplomacy
