= Yuka (name) =

Yuka / Yūka
- Gender: Female

Origin
- Origin: Japanese
- Meaning: different meanings depending on the kanji used
- Region of origin: Japanese

Other names
- Related names: Yukari

Yuka (ゆか, ユカ) and Yūka (ゆうか, ユウカ) are feminine Japanese given names.

== Written forms ==
Yuka and Yūka can be written using different kanji characters and can mean:

- 由香, "reason, fragrance"
- 由華, "reason, beautiful"
- 由佳, "reason, good"
- 由花, "reason, flower"
- 有佳, "exist, good"
- 有香, "exist, fragrance"
- 有華, "exist, beautiful"
- 優花, "tenderness, flower"
- 優香, "tenderness, fragrance"
- 結花, "link, flower"

The name can also be written in hiragana or katakana.

== People ==
pronounced Yuka

- Yuka (有香), a Japanese singer
- Yuka (有華) a Japanese singer-songwriter
- Yuka Ando (安藤 友香; born 1994), a Japanese long-distance runner
- Yuka Endo (遠藤 由華; born 1991), a Japanese rhythmic gymnast
- Yuka Fujimori (藤森 由香; born 1986), a Japanese snowboarder
- Yuka Hirano (平野 由佳; born 1987), a Japanese ice hockey player
- Yuka Hirata (裕香), a Japanese actress and gravure idol
- Yuka Honda (ゆか), a Japanese musician
- Yuka Hoshaku (有香), a Japanese actress
- Yuka Iguchi (井口 裕香, born 1988), a Japanese voice actress
- Yuka Imai (由香, born 1970), a Japanese voice actress
- Yuka Inokuchi (有佳), a Japanese voice actress
- Yuka Ishigaki (石垣 優香; born 1989), a Japanese table tennis player
- Yuka Itaya (由夏), a Japanese actress and newscaster
- Yuka Kamino (神野 由佳; born 1980), a Japanese speed skater
- Yuka Kashino (有香), a Japanese singer and a member of Perfume
- Yuka Kato (加藤 ゆか; born 1986), a Japanese swimmer
- Yuka Komatsu (born 1978) a Japanese voice actress
- Yuka Kosaka (由佳), a Japanese gravure idol, actress and model
- Yuka Kuramochi (倉持 由香; born 1991), a Japanese gravure idol, television personality and actress
- Yuka Mitsumori (三森 由佳; born 1972), a Japanese racewalker
- Yuka Motohashi (由香), a Japanese actress
- Yuka Murayama (由佳), a modern Japanese writer
- Yuka Naoi (直井 由香; born 1963), a Japanese goalball player
- Yuka Nukui (貫井 柚佳), a Japanese voice actress
- Yuka Oda (小田 由香; born 1973), a Japanese ice hockey player
- Yuka Onishi (結花), a Japanese actress and singer
- Yuka Orihara (born 2000), a Finnish ice dancer
- Yuka Sakazaki (坂崎 ユカ, born 1992), is a Japanese professional wrestler
- Yūka Sasaki (佐々木 優香; born 1987), a Japanese ten-pin bowler
- Yuka Sato (有香), a Japanese figure skater
- Yuka Saitō (essayist) (由香), a Japanese essayist and Suntory employee
- Yuka Saitō (voice actress) (佑圭), a Japanese voice actress
- Yuka Takaoka (高岡由佳; born 1998), a Japanese attempted murderer
- Yuka Terasaki (寺崎 裕香), a Japanese voice actress
- Yuka Tsujiyoko (由佳), a Japanese video game music composer for Nintendo
- Yuka Yoshisako (吉迫 由香; born 1979), a Japanese sailor

pronounced Yūka

- Yūka (優香), a Japanese actress
- Yūka Kageyama (影山 優佳; born 2001), a member of Hinatazaka46
- Yuka Kinoshita (木下 ゆうか; born 1985), a Japanese YouTuber
- Yuuka Maeda (憂佳), an ex-member of the Hello! Project group S/mileage
- Yuka Momiki (籾木 結花; born 1996), a Japanese women's footballer
- Yuuka Nanri (侑香), a Japanese voice actress and J-Pop singer
- Yuka Nomura (佑香), a Japanese actress
- Yuka Ogata (緒方 夕佳; born 1975), a Japanese politician
- Yuka Saso (笹生 優花), a Japanese professional golfer
- Yūka Setō (勢藤 優花), a Japanese ski jumper
- Yūka Sugai (菅井 友香; born 1995), an ex-member of Sakurazaka46
- Yūka Tano (優花), an ex-member of AKB48

== Fictional characters ==
pronounced Yuka

- Yuka Koizumi, a character from Guru Guru Pon-chan
- Yuka Nakagawa, a character from the Battle Royale novel, films and manga from the same name
- Yuka Takeuchi, a character from the Variable Geo fighting game series
- Yuka, one of Kagome's schoolmates from InuYasha
- Yuka, a character from Elfen Lied
- Yuka Sanada, a character from Genseishin Justirisers
- Yuka Mochida, a character from Corpse Party
- Yuka Kon, a character from World Trigger
- Yuka Osada, a character from Kamen Rider 555
- Yuka Ohta, a character from Ultraman Z

pronounced Yūka

- Yūka Kazami, a character from the Touhou Project danmaku game series
- Yūka Ichijō, a character from AKB0048
- Yūka Hayase, a character from the role-playing game Blue Archive
- Yūka Okkotsu, the main character of the manga Jujutsu Kaisen Modulo
