= Yucca (disambiguation) =

Yucca is a genus in the plant family Asparagaceae containing species commonly known as yuccas.

Yucca may also refer to:

- Hesperoyucca whipplei, a species of flowering plant closely related to, and formerly usually included in, the genus Yucca
- Yucca Desert, an area of the game EarthBound Beginnings

== Places ==
- Yucca, Arizona
- Yucca, California, alternate name of Muroc, California
- Yucca Flat, a nuclear test region within the Nevada Test Site
- Yucca Mountain, Nevada
- Yucca Valley, California

== See also ==
- Yucca House National Monument, Colorado
- Yucca Mountain nuclear waste repository, Nevada
- Yuka (disambiguation)
- Yukka
