= Morio Kita =

Japanese psychiatrist, novelist and essayist (1927-2011)

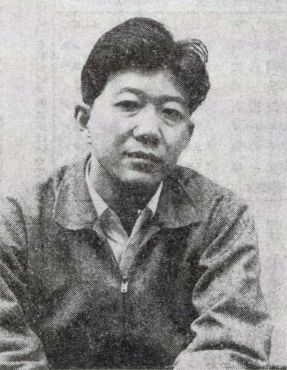
Morio Kita, c. 1960

Morio Kita (北 杜夫, Kita Morio) was the pen name of Sokichi Saitō (斎藤 宗吉, Saitō Sōkichi; 1 May 1927 – 24 October 2011), a Japanese psychiatrist, novelist and essayist.

Kita was the second son of poet Mokichi Saitō. Shigeta Saitō, his older brother, was also a psychiatrist. The essayist Yuka Saitō is Kita's daughter.

Kita attended Azabu High School and Matsumoto Higher School (now part of Shinshu University), and graduated from Tohoku University's School of Medicine. He initially worked as a doctor at Keio University Hospital. Motivated by the collections of his father's poems and the books of German author Thomas Mann, he decided to become a novelist.

Kita suffered from manic–depressive disorder from middle age onwards.

== Awards ==
- 1960: Akutagawa Prize, for the novel, In The Corner Of Night And Fog, which takes its title from Nacht und Nebel, the Nazi campaign to eliminate Jews, the mentally ill and other minorities. The novel concerns the moral quandary of staff at a German mental hospital during the final years of the Second World War. Faced with demands from the SS that the most severely ill patients be segregated for transportation to a special camp, where it is obvious that they will be eliminated, the more morally conscious of the doctors make desperate efforts to protect the patients without outwardly defying the authorities. A parallel theme is the personal tragedy of a young Japanese researcher affiliated with the mental hospital, whose own schizophrenia has been triggered by the disappearance of his half-Jewish wife. (Shinchosha Co., Morio Kita - In the Corner of Night and Fog and Other Stories, 2011)

== Bibliography ==
=== Novels ===
- Ghosts (1954)
- Kita, Morio (1984). The House of Nire. Translated by Dennis Keene. New York: Kodansha International. (Note: Briefly reviewed in the January 14, 1985 issue of The New Yorker, p.117.)

=== Essays ===
- Kita, Morio & Yuka Saitō. Papa wa Tanoshii Sōutubyō (in Japanese). Asahi Shimbun.

———————

Bibliography notes

== Work for television ==
- Nescafé Gold Blend commercial (1974)
- Tetsuko no Heya (1980 and 12 May 2008; with Yuka Saitō)
