= Yukari =

- Pronunciation: jɯkaɾi (IPA)
- Gender: Female

Origin
- Origin: Japanese
- Meaning: Different meanings depending on the kanji used

Other names
- Alternative spelling: Yukari (Kunrei-shiki); Yukari (Nihon-shiki); Yukari (Hepburn)

Yukari is a feminine Japanese given name.

== Written forms ==
Yukari can be written using many different combinations of kanji characters. Here are some examples:

- 由加里, "reason, addition, village"
- 由香里, "reason, scent, village"
- 由佳利, "reason, excellent, benefit"
- 由佳梨, "reason, excellent, pear tree"
- 由華莉, "reason, splendor/flower, jasmine"
- 夕香里, "evening, scent, village"
- 夕香莉, "evening, scent, jasmine"
- 夕花莉, "evening, flower, jasmine"
- 夕佳利, "evening, excellent, benefit"
- 裕佳里, "abundant, excellent, village"
- 裕佳梨, "abundant, excellent, pear tree"
- 優香理, "superiority, scent, logic"
- 友加里, "friend, addition, village"
- 結花理, "tie, flower, logic"
- 紫, "purple"
- 縁, "affinity/destiny"

The name can also be written in hiragana ゆかり or katakana ユカリ.

== Notable people with the name ==
- Yukari Fukui (福井 裕佳梨; born 1982), Japanese actress, voice actress and gravure idol
- Yukari Fresh, real name Yukari Takasaki (高崎 ゆかり), Shibuya-kei artist
- Yukari Goto (後藤 友香里; born 1988), Japanese singer
- Yukari Higa (緋賀 ゆかり), Japanese manga artist
- Yukari Iijima (飯島 夕雁; born 1964), Japanese politician
- Yukari Ichijo (一条 ゆかり; born 1949), Japanese manga artist
- Yukari Kabutomushi (カブトムシ ゆかり; born 1989), Japanese actress
- Yukari Kajihara (加治原 由香里; born 1953), Japanese fencer
- Yukari Kawasaki (河﨑 由加里; born 1976), Japanese archer
- Yukari Kinga (近賀 ゆかり; born 1984), Japanese women's footballer
- Yukari Kokubun (國分 優香里, born 1983), Japanese voice actress
- Yukari Miyake (三宅 由佳莉; born 1986), Japanese singer
- Yukari Mizuno (水野 友加里; born 1986), Japanese actress
- Yukari Nakano (中野 友加里; born 1985), Japanese figure skater
- Yukari Nozawa (野沢 由香里; born 1957), Japanese actress and voice actress
- Yukari Ohno (大野 ゆかり; born 1975), Japanese ice hockey player
- Yukari Oshima (大島 ゆかり; born 1963), Japanese actress and martial artist
- Yukari Sato (佐藤 ゆかり; born 1961), Japanese politician
- Yukari Tachibana (橘 ゆかり; born 1965), Japanese actress
- Yukari Takemoto (竹本 ゆかり; born 1955), Japanese swimmer
- Yukari Tamura (田村 ゆかり), (born 1976), Japanese singer and voice actress
- Yukari Watanabe (渡邊 ゆかり; born 1981), Japanese speed skater
- Yukari Yamamoto (山本 由佳理; born 1981), Japanese field hockey player
- Yukari Yoshihara (吉原 由香里; born 1973), Japanese Go player

== Fictional characters ==
- Yukari, a character in the manga series Kimagure Orange Road
- Yukari, a character in the manga series Murcielago
- Yukari, a character in the light novel series The Zashiki Warashi of Intellectual Village
- Yukari Akiyama (秋山 優花里), a character in the anime series Girls und Panzer
- Yukari Ayatsuji (綾辻ゆかり), a character in the video game/anime series Amagami
- Yukari Fujimurasaki (藤紫 ゆかり), a character in the manga series Rock Is a Lady's Modesty
- Yukari Hayasaka (早坂 紫), a character in the manga series Paradise Kiss
- Yukari Hinata (日向 縁), a character in the manga series Yuyushiki
- Yukari Hirai (平井 ゆかり), a character in the light novel series Shakugan no Shana
- Yukari Kadenokōji (勘解由香里) a character in the video game Blue Archive
- Yukari Kashima (鹿島 由加里), a character in the manga series Vampire Princess Miyu
- Yukari Kawai (河井ユカリ), a teenage character in the series of Little Ghost Q-Taro
- Yukari Kohinata (小日向 縁), a character in the manga series Locodol
- Yukari Kotozume (琴爪 ゆかり), a character in the anime series Kirakira PreCure a la Mode
- Yukari Kusagakure (草隠ゆかり), a character in the manga series A Ninja and an Assassin Under One Roof
- Yukari Marii (マリイゆかり), a character in the manga/light novel series Qualia the Purple
- Yukari Mishakuji (御石寺ゆかり) a character in the anime series K
- Yukari Miyako (都 ゆかり), a character in the manga series Monthly Girls' Nozaki-kun
- Yukari Morita (森田ゆかり), a character in the light novel series Rocket Girls
- Yukari Nejima (根島由佳吏), a character in the manga series Love and Lies
- Yukari Origami (ゆかり折り紙), a character in the anime series Katana Maidens
- Yukari Sahashi (佐橋ゆかり) a character in the manga series Sekirei
- Yukari Sakuragi (桜木 ゆかり), a character in the novel Another
- Yukari Sanjo (三条 ゆかり), a character in the manga series Shugo Chara!
- Yukari Sawatari (沢渡ゆかり), a character in the manga series School Babysitters
- Yukari Sendou (仙童 紫), a character in the manga series Rosario + Vampire
- Yukari Takara (高良 ゆかり), a character in the manga series Lucky Star
- Yukari Takeba (岳羽 ゆかり), a character in the video game Persona 3
- Yukari Tanizaki (谷崎 ゆかり), a character in the manga series Azumanga Daioh
- Yukari Tatsumiya (辰宮ゆかり), a character in the novel series Teito Monogatari
- Yukari Tsubaki (椿 ゆかり), a character in the manga and anime series My Love Story with Yamada-kun at Lv999
- Yukari Tsukino (月野ゆかり), a character in the manga series Ai Kora
- Yukari Wakanae (若苗ゆかり), a character in the manga series Family Compo
- Yukari Yakumo (八雲 紫), a character in Perfect Cherry Blossom from the Touhou Project series
- Yukari Yukino (雪野 百香里), a character in the movie The Garden of Words
- Yukari Yuzuki (結月ゆかり), a character from Vocaloid

== See also ==
- Yukari Telepath, a 2007 album by Coaltar of the Deepers
