= Ladies' Agreement =

1921 agreement between the United States and Japan

The Ladies' Agreement of 1921 was an informal agreement between the United States and Japan that barred the emigration of picture brides. This agreement almost completely ended Japanese emigration to America, following the Gentlemen's Agreement of 1907. The previous arrangement allowed the wives and family members of Japanese currently living in the United States to emigrate from Japan, but the Ladies' Agreement closed this loophole for prospective immigrants. This loophole had generated rapid flow of Japanese women into the United States until the Ladies' Agreement.

== Background ==
=== Japanese immigration ===
Although the immigration of male Japanese workers into the US was essentially cut off by the Gentlemen's Agreement, that of Japanese women remained unrestricted. In the period of heavy immigration of Japanese woman into the Hawaiian islands and west coast of the United States that preceded the Ladies’ Agreement, the Japanese government had encouraged married women to move to America to reunite with their husbands and single women to be assigned husbands in the United States, as they recognized the dangers in a bachelor society. The practice of picture bride matchmaking was often one of the many elaborate ways of escaping restrictions created by the Gentlemen's Agreement. Because the Gentlemen's Agreement prohibited Japanese entrance into the U.S., but allowed the immigrant workers already residing there to remain, their desire to start a family as well as Japanese women's desire to explore the opportunities of America were sufficed by the picture bride system. Proxy marriages were another popular way of making it possible for Japanese woman to legally migrate to America, which increased the immigration rate even more. This high tide of Japanese women entering America through the west coast helped contribute to a strong American desire to cut it off by closing any loophole that might have allowed it.

=== American response ===
Thus, American politicians and diplomats, one being Charles H. Sherrill, proposed limiting immigration of Japanese women along with men. The agreement was suggested because Americans feared that the practice of picture brides would counteract the effects of the Gentlemen's Agreement. Japanese women and their children often became laborers, thus intensifying the immigrant economic competition that was originally to be avoided. The picture bride system also brought about cultural judgement of Japanese immigrants, as the practice of completely arranged marriage majorly differed from traditional American views on matrimonial choice. Many even believed it was a disguise for the practice of transporting Japanese prostitutes.

== Establishing Agreement ==
With the United States wanting to eliminate what they believed were cultural and economic problems, and Japan in desire to ease tensions in their relationship with the United States, the two countries negotiated and came to an agreement. On March 1, 1920, the Japanese government would stop giving passports to picture brides. It was negotiated as an informal agreement to avoid the obstacle of ratification and the high stakes of national reputation. This left 24,000 Japanese immigrant bachelors in the United States.

The Ladies' Agreement also largely limited the immigration of Korean picture brides, as Korea was occupied by Japan at the time. It was not until 1945, when Korea was liberated from Japan control, that Korean immigration continued to flow into the United States.

== Effects ==
Although the Ladies' Agreement of 1921 greatly restricted Japanese immigration, complete Japanese exclusion, along with that of the rest of Asian immigrants, was statutorily established by the Immigration Act of 1924. The limits that the Ladies' Agreement, and other nativist legislation, put on Japanese immigration were largely repealed with President Lyndon B. Johnson's passage of the Immigration and Nationality Act of 1965, which more than doubled Japanese immigration into America.
