= Yukari Kabutomushi =

Japanese actress

- カブトムシ ゆかり
- Born: Yukari Tomizawa; January 26, 1989 (age 37); Tokyo, Japan
- Occupation: Actress
- Agent: Oscar Promotion
- Height: 1.58 m (5 ft 2 in) (2012)

Yukari Tomizawa (富澤 友加里, Tomizawa Yukari; born January 26, 1989, in Tokyo, Japan), better known as Yukari Kabutomushi (カブトムシ ゆかり, Kabutomushi Yukari), is a Japanese actress who was last represented by the talent agency, Oscar Promotion.

== Filmography ==
=== TV series ===
Year	Title	Network	Notes
	Toranaide Kudasai!! Gravure Idol Ura Monogatari	TV Tokyo	Episode 7
2012	Waratte Iitomo!	Fuji TV	
2012	Kudamaki Hachibee X	TV Tokyo	
2012	Owarai Wide Show Marco Porori!	KTV	
2012	Dacho Libre	TV Asahi	
2012	Zakiroba! Ashura no Susume	NBN	
	Shinō Densetsu	TV Saitama	Regular
	DJ Mono Festa	Fuji TV	
2013	Shimura Ken no Baka Tonosama	Fuji TV	
2013	Tokyo Kawai TV	NHK General	
2013	O Sekkyō Idol Shikaru Genji	ABC	
2013	Ariyoshi Japon	TBS	
2013	Koroshi no Joōbachi	TV Tokyo	Episode 2
2013	Mayonaka no o Baka Sawagi!	Chiba TV, Tokyo MX	
2013	Fuji TV Young Scenario Taishō "Jinsei-gokko"	Fuji TV	
	Out × Deluxe	Fuji TV	Quasi-regular
	Music On! TV	HBS	
2014	Enjoy! Baseball	Fuji TV	Reporter
2014	High Noon TV Viking!	Fuji TV	
2014	Quiz 30: Danketsu seyo!	Fuji TV	
2014	Banana Juku	THK	
2014	Kaden no Gakkō	BS Japan	Summer Vacation Special
2014	Sanma & Kuryimu no Geinō-kai (hi) Kojin Jōhō Grand Prix	Fuji TV	
2014	Darwin ga Kita!: Ikimono Shin Densetsu	NHK General	
2014	Aka Pen Takigawa Sensei	TV Asahi	
2014	Honmadekka!?TV	Fuji TV	
2014	Takajin No Money	TVO	
2014	Kuryimu vs. Osamu Hayashi! Toshikoshi Quiz Savior	TV Asahi	
2015	Okaeri na Sai	FTB	

=== Radio series ===
Year	Title	Network	Notes
	Emotional Beat Hime Raji	Rainbowtown FM	Regular
2012	Terumi Yoshida Sokodaijinatoko	NCB	
2012	Katsushika Night	Katsushika FM	
2012	Recommen	NCB	
2012	Wktk Radio Gakuen	NHK Radio 1	
2012	Wanted!!	TBS Radio	
2013	Ko Bandai Maō Tsugikore	NBS	
2014	Beat Goes On	FM Fuji	
2014	Masaki Omura no Science Kids	NCB	
2015	Umaitsu!	NHK-G	

=== Films ===
Year	Title	Notes
2011	Men's Egg Drummers	

=== Internet series ===
Title	Network	Notes
Hime Rianzu TV	Ustream	
Hime Rianzu Channel	Ameba Studio	
Hime Petit 634	Wallop	

=== Stage ===
Year	Title	Notes
2013	Green Musical: Lady Bird, Lady Bird	Theater Green Box in Box Theater
