= Yuko Yamashita =

Japanese hair specialist

Yuko Yamashita (山下 裕子, Yamashita Yūko) is a Japanese straight hair specialist. She is the creator of the YUKO Hair Straightening system. She is considered one of the world's best hair experts, according to Yahoo! News.

== Career ==
Her research and came up with a hair-straightening system that would tame frizzy hair with stubborn waves without damaging it. She launched Yuko Hair Straightening in 1996, a special straightening process in which collagen, keratin and silk proteins are ironed out into the hair follicle to smoothen each strand. She opened the first specialized smoothing salon in Japan which earned a major success. Four years later, she opened her first smoothing salon abroad, in Beverly Hills, United States and her straightening service is now being offered in the United Kingdom. Among his clients are personalities of Arab royalty, influential politicians and artists such as Jennifer Aniston.

Yamashita worked with Phiten to create YUKO Hair Straightening (also known as thermal reconditioning), which is a method for permanently straightening human hair. The system was initially granted a patent in Japan, and Yamashita opened her first specialist hair straightening salon in 1996.

Yamashita is currently working with Unilever brand, Sunsilk, as a product co-creator. She is the brand’s straight hair expert.
