= Yusuke Mine =

Japanese actor

Yusuke Mine (峰 祐介, Mine Yūsuke, born June 1934, in Osaka, Japan) is a Japanese-born actor who is probably best known for his role on the 26-lesson TV program Let's Learn Japanese. On the program, he performed in skits that contained the sentence patterns that each episode focused on and assisted viewers with the day's material with pronunciation drills. He also lent his voice to the pronunciation of hiragana characters.

Apart from Let's Learn Japanese Basic I, he has performed in several stage plays in Japan. He is married and lives with his spouse in Tokyo, Japan.

== Characters ==
Yusuke has portrayed the following characters on Let's Learn Japanese Basic I:

1. Prison Inmate
2. Painter
3. Mechanic
4. Waiter
5. Bar Tender (Lesson 10)
6. TV Weatherman
7. Police Officer (Koban)
8. Doctor
9. Veterinarian
10. Detective (Lesson 11)
11. Jewelry Store Clerk
12. Father (Lesson 11)
13. Gymnastics Judge (Lesson 21)
14. Hospital Inpatient (Lesson 11)
15. Office Worker (Lesson 7)
16. Mover

== Filmography ==
1. Hiroshima (1995)
