= Yuka Takaoka =

Japanese attempted murderer (born 1998)

- 高岡由佳
- Born: January 28, 1998 (age 28)
- Occupation: Hostess (former)
- Status: Released
- Motive: Revenge for perceived infidelity; suicidal ideation
- Conviction: Attempted murder
- Penalty: 3 1/2 years in prison

Details
- Date: May 23, 2019
- Locations: 6-chōme-20-7 Shinjuku, Shinjuku City, Tokyo, Japan
- Injured: Phoenix Luna
- Weapon: Kitchen knife

Yuka Takaoka (高岡由佳, Takaoka Yuka, born 28 January 1998) is a Japanese woman known for having stabbed her boyfriend with a kitchen knife in their apartment in Shinjuku, Tokyo, in May 2019. She was found guilty of attempted murder in December 2019 and sentenced to 3 1/2 years in prison.

Takaoka gained an online following due to the circumstances of the attack and her physical appearance when she was described in media reports as a "real life yandere", a term in Japanese anime used to describe a girl who suddenly becomes aggressive, deranged, and homicidal towards a lover.

== Background ==
Not much is known about Yuka Takaoka's early life, besides that she was born an only child and, after dropping out of university to pursue a career in the Japanese Bar and Service industry, obtained a management position at a girls' hostess club in Shinjuku Ward, Tokyo. In October 2018, she met her boyfriend Phoenix Luna, who was a bar worker at the Fusion By Youth nightclub, located in the Kabukicho red-light district. Original reports stated that the couple moved into an apartment together on the fifth floor of Plaire Deuzq East Shinjuku 2 on May 20, 2019, but Luna later disputed this.

== Stabbing of Phoenix Luna ==
On May 23, 2019, Takaoka was looking at Luna's cell phone whilst he was in the bathroom, and came across photos of Luna with other women at the nightclub, which she interpreted to be photos of Luna being intimate with other women. That night, Takaoka waited until approximately 3:50 AM to ensure Luna was fully asleep, and thrusted a kitchen knife into Luna's abdomen. Luna then quickly pushed Takaoka away, and ran towards the elevator before falling unconscious.

Takaoka said she became sad, and both wanted Luna dead and wanted to die herself. She then took a bloodied Luna to the lobby of their residence. In a now-infamous photo, Takaoka is shown sitting on the floor of the residence lobby next to Luna's nude, unconscious body and ignoring officers arriving at the scene, with her legs covered in Luna's blood while smoking a cigarette and calling through her cell phone, reportedly stating that "I did not want to go anywhere, so I sat down at the outside staircase ... I did not call emergency services because I intended to die after watching him die from the stabbing." Takaoka claimed that, "Since I loved him so much, I just couldn't help it. After killing [him], I, too, wanted to die." She was arrested and charged with attempted murder. Luna was hospitalized in critical condition and remained in a coma for five days, but survived the attack and made a full recovery. While in custody inside a patrol car, Takaoka flashed what was described as an "evil grin" to an unknown person.

== Aftermath ==
=== Social media attention ===
Following the attack, Takaoka gained online notoriety due to her perceived attractive appearance among the online public and similarities to a yandere, a term in anime used to describe a psychotic and often homicidal girl obsessed with a lover after perceived betrayal. Users on Instagram had described Takaoka as a "too beautiful criminal." Social media users created fan-made photos and videos, in addition to paintings and drawings dedicated to her in what was described in the media as a dark fascination with the crime. Kenji Nakano of Tokyo Reporter and Marnie O'Neill of News.com.au wrote that Takaoka's fanbase is an example of a broader and troubling online phenomenon towards attractive criminals, nearly akin to celebrity worship.

=== Legal proceedings ===
Takaoka was tried for the attempted murder of Luna in December 2019. She was found guilty on December 3, 2019, with Takaoka sobbing as the verdict was read. The prosecution sought a prison term of five years. On December 5, 2019, she was sentenced to 3 1/2 years in prison, with the judge calling Takaoka's crime "selfish" and that she had a "strong intent to kill." Luna stated that he did not hold a grudge against Takaoka, stating, "If possible, I want people to be able to lead a normal life rather than paying for their sins." Before the trial, Luna had settled a lawsuit out-of-court against Takaoka for ¥5,000,000 (US$39,271).

=== Release ===
Takaoka was released from prison at an unknown date in 2023, and as of that year, is livestreaming games and posting cosplay photos.
