= Yusuke Hashiba =

Yusuke HASHIBA
- Born: June 22, 1851; Tokyo, Japan
- Died: November 5, 1921 (aged 70)
- Other name: 羽柴 雄輔
- Occupations: archaeologist, historian and anthropologist

Yusuke Hashiba (羽柴 雄輔, Hashiba Yūsuke; 22 June 1851 – 5 December 1921) was a Japanese archaeologist, historian and anthropologist.

He was an expert in the Edo period of the samurai, and was also particularly knowledgeable about Japanese folklore, in which he has been referenced in several publications. From the 1880s he was much involved with the Anthropological Association in Tokyo, publishing a number of works, and was one of the founders of the Ou Anthropological Association in November 1890.
