= Let's Learn Japanese =

Video-based Japanese language study course

- Genre: Educational television
- Starring: Mary Althaus; Yusuke Mine; Miki Sugihara; Hiroyuki Kaihō Nick Muhrin; Mitsuru Yamazaki; Midori Kimura; Kazuki Yao; Kumi Samejima Tae Umino; Seiji Andō; Chinatsu Koyanagi; Yorinobu Kodama
- Country of origin: Japan
- Original language: English with Japanese segments
- No. of seasons: 2
- No. of episodes: 52

Production
- Running time: 30 minutes
- Production company: The Japan Foundation

Original release
- Release: 1984 – 1985; 1995

Let's Learn Japanese is a video-based Japanese language study course for English speakers produced by The Japan Foundation.

The two seasons (Series I and Series II) were originally aired on television at a rate of one episode per day, with each episode consisting of two lessons. Text books which complement the series were also available; these contained vocabulary lists, explanations of grammar, transcriptions of scenes from within the program, and cultural information about Japan. By now, the first book is out of print but the second book is still available from some sources. Both seasons used a drama called Yan and the Japanese People for instruction. This drama consisted of scenes which focus on the experiences of a young man named Yan (played by Nick Muhrin), a foreigner living and working in Japan.

== Let's Learn Japanese Basic I ==
Series one of Let's Learn Japanese was made in 1984 and 1985. It was presented by Mary Althaus and featured a number of skits, featuring Mine-san (Yusuke Mine), Sugihara-san (Miki Sugihara), and Kaihō-san (Hiroyuki Kaihō), who were designed to help the viewer memorize, and practice the use of, new words and grammatical structures. The series also followed the story of Yan's new life in Japan working as an architect.

== Let's Learn Japanese Basic II ==
Series two was created in 1995 —10 years after the end of the first series—and was presented by Tae Umino. The skits were performed by Andō-san (Seiji Andō), Koyanagi-san (Chinatsu Koyanagi) and Kodama-san (Yorinobu Kodama). In this series the story of Yan is continued (based on Episode 14–26 of the original Drama), only this time it is much darker and more interesting. Yan's heart is torn asunder by the young lady he had a crush on in series one, and he goes to Niigata to drown his sorrows in the wild winter Sea of Japan.

== Other series ==
=== NHK Let's Learn Japanese Series ===
There was also another Japanese language study series named NHK Japanese: how to survive in Japan? which was produced by the Japanese TV Network NHK in 1989. This 40-part series was about David Roberts (ostensibly an American but speaks with an Australian accent) who went to Japan for work. He was assisted by a beautiful girl named Yuko Goto, and in later episodes they are joined by David's wife, Cathy Roberts. David was going to introduce to Japan American culture and food with the American Train.

=== Erin's Challenge! I can speak Japanese ===
A fresh start to the Japan Foundation program was the third series, "Erin's Challenge! I can speak Japanese", which aired first in spring 2007 and is also available on DVD and in the form of an interactive website. As it is especially designed for young people it features skits about Senior High School Students which are explained by computer-animated figures. The main character Erin is learning Japanese with the help of the teacher Honigon and a small robot called N21-J. Besides the regular skits and explanations, there is also more information about Japan, its students and people around the world who are learning Japanese, too.

== Episode list ==
=== Let's Learn Japanese Basic I ===
#	Title, topics
1	I'm Yan. – わたしはヤンです。 Watashi wa Yan desu. Skit: Yan arrives at the airport and meets Mr. Katō (加藤) and his son Tarō (太郎). They drive around town and finally arrive at the Katō family home. Grammar: the copula です desu, greetings, possessive pronouns, the の no particle for declaring possession, demonstrative pronouns, questions with the か ka particle, apologies.
2	What's that? – あれはなんですか？ Are wa nan desu ka? Grammar: Giving thanks, possessive pronouns, the も mo particle with nouns, simple negative replies to questions, demonstrative pronouns Extras: 針金細工 Harigane saiku, the craft of bending wires into objects.
3	There's a cat. – ねこがいます。 Neko ga imasu. Skit: Yan and Tarō visit a rental agent and look at different housing options. All three then visit the premises and meet the landlord. Yan moves in, with the Katō family helping. Grammar: denoting presence with ある aru and いる iru, the よ yo particle, answering questions. Writing: General information on the writing system.
4	Where is it? - どこにいますか？ Doko ni imasu ka? Grammar: the に ni particle for indicating locations ("where at"), prepositions, the や ya particle for non-exhaustive object lists, the と to particle for exhaustive object lists, adjectives. Writing and pronouncing the letters あいうえお.
5	Please give me some stamps. – 切手をください。 Kitte o kudasai. Skit: Yan goes to the post office to buy some stamps and thereafter rushes to Shibuya. There, he phones Mr. Katō to meet him there. The two take a taxi to work, where Yan meets his future colleagues. Grammar: asking for directions, making requests with 〜を下さい ~ o kudasai, counting numbers, counter words. Writing and pronouncing the letters あいうえお once more.
6	Please turn left at the next corner. – 次の角を左へまがってください。 Tsugi no kado o hidari e magatte kudasai. Grammar: the て te form for verbs, making requests with 〜て下さい ~te kudasai, giving directions. Writing and pronouncing the letters かきくけこ.
7	May I look at this? – これ見てもいいですか？ Kore mite mo ii desu ka? Skit: Yan leaves for his second day at work, where he gets more enrolled with the group. Grammar: the て te form for verbs, requests with 〜て下さい, asking for and giving permission with 〜てもいい ~te mo ii. Writing and pronouncing the letters さしすせそ.
8	May I write with a pencil? – えんぴつで書いてもいいですか？ Enpitsu de kaite mo ii desu ka? Grammar: て te form for verbs, 〜て下さい, 〜てもいい, variations on asking (using 下さいませんか kudasaimasen ka), the に ni particle to indicate a target location ("where (in)to"), the で de particle to indicate means of doing something. Writing and pronouncing the letters たちつてと.
9	She gets up at 6 o'clock every morning. – 毎朝6時に起きます。 Maiasa roku-ji ni okimasu. Skit: A day in the life of the Katō family, from morning to night, is depicted. Daughter Midori goes to school, son Tarō to university, and Mr. Katō to work, while Mrs. Katō does housework. Yan visits in the evening. Grammar: expressing time. Writing and pronouncing the letters なにぬねの.
10	He doesn't drink milk. – 牛乳は飲みません。 Gyūnyū wa nomimasen. Grammar: expressing time, negative forms for verbs, で de particle to indicate means, the へ e particle to indicate direction (and sometimes, destination) of movement, the も mo particle with verbs, one-time and habitual actions using the 〜ます ~masu ending, the に ni particle to indicate time in combination with an action. Writing and pronouncing the letters はひふへほ. Extras: 折り紙 Origami, the art of paper-folding.
11	I went to Nikkō. – 日光へ行きました。 Nikkō e ikimashita. Skit: Yan visits the Katō family to show pictures of when he went to Nikkō and Tōshō-gū (東照宮). Grammar: time prepositions and words, polite and plain past tense verb forms, the 〜んです ~ n desu form. Writing and pronouncing the letters まみむめも.
12	When did you go? – いつ行ったんですか？ Itsu itta n desu ka? Grammar: past negative verb forms, plain present form for verbs, expressing plans with 〜つもりです ~ tsumori desu Writing and pronouncing the letters らりるれろ.
13	They're watching a baseball game. – いま野球の試合を見ています。 Ima yakyū no shiai o mite imasu. Skit: Tarō and Midori are at a baseball game, waiting for Yan to finish working. At the Katō house, Mr. Katō drinks beer while watching the game on television. Yan, Tarō, and Midori return home. Grammar: combining particle with topic 〜では ~ dewa, polite present progressive verb forms, て te form + 〜います ~ imasu Writing and pronouncing the letters やゆよわん.
14	He's drinking beer while watching TV. – ビールを飲みながらテレビを見ています。 Bīru o nominagara, terebi o mite imasu. Grammar: plain present progressive verb forms て te form + 〜いる ~ iru, the verb ending meaning "while" 〜ながら ~ nagara Writing: Gemination written with small っ, extra vowel length: ā (aa) 〜(あ)あ, ī (ii) 〜(い)い, ū (uu) 〜(う)う
15	It's hot every day. – 毎日あついですね。 Mainichi atsui desu ne. Skit: Yan shows the Suzuki Family his souvenirs from Takayama (高山市). Afterwards, he goes to Akihabara (秋葉原) to buy electronics. Then, Yan takes a bath at the Katō house. Grammar: present and past form of い i adjectives (〜い ~i, 〜かった ~ katta), the phrase いかがでしたか。ikaga deshita ka? meaning "What did you think?" Writing: extra vowel length ei 〜(え)い, ō (oo) 〜(お)う
16	Is it hot enough? – おふろはぬるくありませんか？ Ofuro wa nuruku arimasen ka?
17	I want to drink some cold beer. – 冷たいビールが飲みたいですね。 Tsumetai bīru ga nomitai desu ne.
18	Do you dislike fish? – 魚はきらいですか？ Sakana wa kirai desu ka?
19	Mt. Fuji will come into view before long. – そろそろ富士山が見えるでしょう。 Sorosoro, Fuji-san ga mieru deshō.
20	It looks good. – おいしそうですね。 Oishi sō desu ne.
21	I can't speak English. – 英語は話せませんよ。 Eigo wa hanasemasen yo.
22	Is it possible to see the model room? – モデルルームは見られませんか？ Moderu rūmu wa miraremasen ka?
23	Why aren't cars passing? – どうして車が通らないんですか？ Dōshite kuruma ga tōranai n desu ka?
24	We're a little late, so let's hurry. – 少し遅くなったから急ぎましょう。 Sukoshi osokunatta kara, isogimashō.
25	What's in the briefcase? – かばんの中に何が入っていますか？ Kaban no naka ni nani ga haitte imasu ka?
26	Do you remember? – おぼえていますか？ Oboete imasu ka?

=== Let's Learn Japanese Basic II ===
#	Title, topics
1	I think I can be there by 4:00. – 4時には行けると思います。 Yo-ji niwa ikeru to omoimasu.
2	Maybe you should go and meet her soon. – そろそろ迎えに行ったほうがいいんじゃないですか？ Sorosoro, mukae ni itta hō ga ii n ja nai desu ka?
3	He said he's going to Nagasaki today. – 今日は長崎へ行くんですって。 Kyō wa Nagasaki e iku n desu tte.
4	I got them from a friend. – 友達にもらったんです。 Tomodachi ni moratta n desu.
5	We're thinking of singing Beethoven's Ninth. – あたしたち、第9を歌おうと思っているんです。 Atashitachi, Dai-kyū o utaō to omotte iru n desu.
6	Try reading the Japanese. – 日本語を読んでみてください。 Nihon-go o yonde mite kudasai.
7	It's nice and clean now. – きれいになりましたね。 Kirei ni narimashita ne.
8	Will you turn up the volume on the TV a little bit? – テレビの音をもう少し大きくしてください。 Terebi no oto o mō sukoshi ōkiku shite kudasai.
9	Turn off the stove when you leave the room. – 部屋を出るときにストーブを消してくださいね。 Heya o deru toki ni, sutōbu o keshite kudasai ne.
10	I'm so bored, I don't know what to do. – 退屈で困っているんです。 Taikutsu de komatte iru n desu.
11	Shall I change the towel? – タオル(を)変えましょうか？ Taoru (o) kaemashō ka?
12	Mr. Terada has been taking care of me. – 寺田さんが看病してくださったんです。 Terada-san ga kanbyō-shite kudasatta n desu.
13	If this design is chosen, I'll go back to my country. – もしこれが採用になったら僕は国へ帰ります。 Moshi kore ga saiyō ni nattara, boku wa kuni e kaerimasu.
14	You mustn't tell Yan. – ヤンさんに言っちゃダメですよ。 Yan-san ni iccha dame desu yo.
15	He doesn't seem to be there. – いないみたいですね。 Inai mitai desu ne.
16	Even if we invite him, I don't think he'll come. – 誘ってもダメだと思いますけど。 Sasottemo, dame da to omoimasu kedo.
17	I was in a hurry, so I couldn't buy it. – 急いでいたので買えなかったんです。 Isoide ita node, kaenakatta n desu.
18	I'm planning to see the sea, visit old houses, and so on. – 海を見たり古い家を見たりしようと思っているんです。 Umi o mitari, furui ie o mitari, shiyō to omotte iru n desu.
19	It's hard, working like that in this snow. – 雪が降っているのに...？ 大変ですねえ。 Yuki ga futte iru noni...? Taihen desu nē.
20	What's this fish called? – これ、何という魚ですか？ Kore, nan to yū sakana desu ka?
21	The sakura hasn't bloomed yet, has it? – 桜はまだ咲いていませんか？ Sakura wa mada saite imasen ka?
22	There's only one bottle left. – もう一本しかありませんよ。 Mō ippon shika arimasen yo.
23	We'll miss you when you're gone. – ヤンさんと会えなくなるのは寂しいですねえ。 Yan-san to aenakunaru no wa, sabishii desu nē.
24	I've never traveled abroad before. – 私も外国旅行したことはありませんよ。 Watashi mo gaikoku-ryokō o shita koto wa arimasen yo.
25	Give it to him when he's come down. – ヤンさんがきたときに渡してね。 Yan-san ga kita toki ni, watashite ne.
26	If you're ever in Japan again, please stop by. – 日本にきたとき(に)は必ず寄ってくださいよ。 Nihon ni kita toki (ni)wa, kanarazu yotte kudasai yo.
