= Yuka Saitō (essayist) =

Japanese essayist and Suntory employee (born 1962)

Yuka Saitō (斎藤 由香, Saitō Yuka, born April 9, 1962) is a Japanese essayist and Suntory employee. She is a graduate of Seijo University's School of Literature.

She is a daughter of novelist Morio Kita, a niece of psychiatrist Shigeta Saitō and a granddaughter of poet Mokichi Saitō.

== Bibliography ==
- Madogiwa OL Tohoho na Asa Ufufu no Yoru (Shinchosha, ISBN 978-4104678013)
  - Manga serialization in Manga Time (Manga by Nobu Ueda, Houbunsha, ISBN 978-4832265493)
- Madogiwa OL Kaisha wa Itsu mo Ten'yawan'ya (Shinchosha, ISBN 978-4104678020)
- Mota Sensei to Madogiwa OL no Hitodukiai ga Raku ni Naru Hon (work with Shigeta Saitō, Shueisha, ISBN 978-4083330728)
- Mōjo to Yobareta Shukujo: Sobo Saitō Teruko no Ikikata (Shinchosha, ISBN 978-4104678037)
- Madogiwa OL Oya to Jōshi wa Erabenai (Shinchosha, ISBN 978-4101295732)
- Papa wa Tanoshii Sōutubyō (work with Morio Kita, Asahi Shimbun Company, ISBN 978-4022504999)
- Madogiwa OL Jinjikou-ka de Gakeppuchi (Shinchosha, ISBN 978-4101295749)

== TV ==
- Tetsuko no Heya (May 12, 2008 with Morio Kita)

== See also ==
- Sawako Agawa
