= Yuka (singer, born 1994) =

- Born: 1994 (age 31–32)
- Genres: Pop, J-pop
- Instruments: Vocals, Piano
- Labels: flowernote (2018 - 2022); Nippon Columbia(2023- )

Yuka (有華) (born 1994) is a Japanese singer-songwriter. She is from Takatsuki, Osaka Prefecture.

== Biography ==
Born in Takatsuki City, Osaka Prefecture, as the youngest of three siblings.

Since childhood, Yuka has been learning piano and vocal music at a local music school, harboring a fascination for singing from an early age.

During high school, she began creating original songs and, in her third year, made the decision to become a singer. Despite facing multiple rejections in various contests and auditions, she persisted. Instead of joining a talent agency, she entered the workforce at a regular company while continuing her musical activities at live houses on weekends.

During this time, Yuka gained attention by posting cover videos of songs by well-known artists on platforms like Instagram. In 2015, her "Birthday Song" uploaded on YouTube garnered increased views, gradually drawing more recognition.

In 2017, she held her first solo concert. Subsequently, from June to September 2018, she organized her second solo tour, with tickets selling out at every venue.

On July 3, 2019, Yuka released her first nationally distributed mini-album, "Kimi no Suppli". She conducted her third solo concert tour across 12 venues from July to September 2019.

In May 2021, she digitally released "Icchirensei." On February 16, 2022, she digitally released a re-arranged version of her representative song, "Birthday Song - 2002 Ver." Furthermore, on June 22, the digital release of the EP "Stamp Rally" was announced, accompanied by the release of a CD+T-shirt set on June 29 (limited to online sales and live venues). In July, she held the "Yuka One-Man Tour 2022 'Stamp Rally.'"

On January 18, 2023, she made her major debut with the digital single "Baby You", with songwriting provided by Takahito Uchizawa of Androp.

On March 1, her major debut single "Baby You" claimed the top spot on the Billboard TikTok Weekly Top 20 as of March 1. It surpassed 12 million streams, 3 million views for the music video, and a total of 2 billion social media plays. On April 12, the release "Happy Date" was chosen as the theme song for the NHK drama 'Otonari ni Ginga.' On April 18, "Baby You" entered the top 10 on Spotify's viral charts in Indonesia, Malaysia, Thailand, Singapore, the Philippines, and Vietnam. Additionally, it secured the second position in the Indonesia TikTok Song Rankings, with TikTok posts exceeding 500,000 worldwide. On October 25, she released her major 1st album, 'messy bag', with the track "#Me" featured as the CM song for Rohto Pharmaceutical's "Rohto Reset", starring Yuka herself.
